= ...Cooks! =

British TV cookery series (2006–2010)

- Also known as: Saturday Cooks! Daily Cooks Challenge
- Presented by: Antony Worrall Thompson
- Country of origin: United Kingdom
- No. of series: 8
- No. of episodes: 167

Production
- Running time: 60–90 minutes (including adverts)
- Production company: Prospect Pictures

Original release
- Network: ITV1, ITV3
- Release: 10 June 2006 – 21 May 2010

Related
- ITV Food

...Cooks! is an ITV television cookery show, hosted by Antony Worrall Thompson, broadcast between 10 June 2006 to 21 May 2010.

== Formats ==
There were different names for the show, depending on which day it aired. The Saturday morning show was called Saturday Cooks!, whilst the show that aired during the week was called Daily Cooks Challenge. This series aired in a weekday prime-time slot and from its second series was shot in front of a studio audience. It has mostly been broadcast on ITV3 between 2008 and 2012 with new episodes on ITV1.

Worrall Thompson, who previously hosted a similar BBC One show, Saturday Kitchen, defected to ITV in June 2006 after being poached from the BBC along with the production company that made the show (Prospect Pictures), in a deal negotiated by Alison Sharman. It was Sharman who originally brokered the deal that brought Worrall Thompson to the BBC on Saturday Kitchen in the first place, before she herself moved to ITV.

A sister programme Sunday Feast aired on Sunday mornings. The programme was cancelled due to poor ratings.

A brand new series of Daily Cooks Challenge was broadcast from 29 March 2008 to 21 May 2010.

== Scheduling ==
Saturday Cooks! aired on the ITV network from 10 June 2006 to 15 December 2007. When it first started it aired at 9:25 am but then was moved first to 11:30 am and later, in 2007, to 12 noon. This was to initially compete with the BBC's offering Saturday Kitchen.

== Spin-offs ==
A spin-off series, Christmas Cooks! aired during the Christmas period in 2006 at 10:30 am on weekday mornings on the ITV network. It returned for a second series in December 2007. In 2008, Christmas Cooks! was replaced by Christmas Cooks Challenge. In the 2009 'Christmas Specials' there were three selected Christmas Cooks episodes, which were repeated from 2008. In 2010, there were no episodes over the festive period.

A brand new series of Daily Cooks Challenge was broadcast from 29 March 2010 to 21 May 2010.

== Regular weekly chefs ==
- Antony Worrall Thompson
- Gino D'Acampo
- Jean-Christophe Novelli
- Brian Turner

== Guest chefs ==
- John Burton-Race
- Ken Hom
- Keith Floyd
- Ching-He Huang
- Ed Baines
- Eadie Manson
- Frank Bordoni
- Merrilees Parker
- Jun Tanaka
- Maria Elia
- Sophie Wright
- Paul Rankin
- Martin Blunos
- Silvana Franco
- Rustie Lee
- Jill Dupleix
- Aldo Zilli
- Mary Berry
- Richard Phillips
- Ben O'Donoghue
- Andrew Nutter
- Momma Cherri
- Jo Pratt

== Wine experts ==
- Jilly Goolden
- Matt Skinner
- Joe Wadsack

== DVDs ==
- Daily Cooks Challenge: Mains Volume One
- Daily Cooks Challenge: Mains Volume Two
- Daily Cooks Challenge: Desserts
- Daily Cooks Challenge: 3 DVD Box set

== See also ==
List of celebrities appearing on Daily Cooks Challenge
