= Martin Blunos =

British TV chef

- Born: 11 April 1960 (age 66); Bath, Somerset, England
- Spouse: Siân Blunos
- Culinary career
- Cooking style: French cuisine with Baltic references
- Ratings: Michelin stars; Good Food Guide; AA Rosettes
- Previous restaurant: Lettonie
- Television shows: Cooks; Great Food Live; Food Poker; Food Uncut; Iron Chef UK; Saturday Kitchen; The Supersizers Eat...; Iron Chef Thailand

Martin Lauris Blunos (born 11 April 1960) is a British TV chef. Blunos earned two Michelin Guide stars at his restaurant Lettonie, first in Bristol and then in Bath.

== Early life and career ==
Blunos is from Bath, Somerset. His parents came from Latvia to England just after the World War II. Martin attended Thornbury Castle School, where he excelled in Home Economics. After completing his schooling, Blunos learned his craft through college training in Cheltenham and Cambridge. His cooking style is influenced by his half Russian half Latvian mother. He did a spell at the Strand Palace Hotel in London, a season in Switzerland and went on a Greek tycoon's yacht before settling down in a job at Lampwick's in Battersea, London.

Blunos's first restaurant as chef and owner was Lettonie (French for Latvia) in Bristol, which opened in 1988 with a Franco-British style of cooking with some Eastern European elements. He had opened it with his then girlfriend, Siân, who would later become his wife. He earned his first Michelin star there in 1989, and a second in 1991. He felt at the time that his fellow chefs didn't give him much credit, as he wasn't well known prior to winning the accolades from Michelin. In 1997 he moved Lettonie to larger premises in his home town of Bath where he was assisted by James Tanner. He subsequently felt that he didn't get enough out of the Lettonie "brand", as at the time he felt that he couldn't run more than a single location. The restaurant closed in 2001 as he felt that as a chef-proprietor, he couldn't devote enough time to his family. It was the birth of his daughter that prompted the decision and thought that the only thing that kept his marriage together was that his wife also worked at the restaurant. He opened a new restaurant called Blinis, and his two Michelin star rating followed him to the new premises. In September 2002, the owners, Sebastian and Philippa Hughes decided to close the restaurant. Blunos launched a court case for unfair dismissal.

Blunos cooked for Queen Elizabeth II and the Duke of Edinburgh whilst they were visiting Bath as part of the Golden Jubilee tour, in 2002. Following the closure of Lettonie, Blunos was kept busy for the next two years with television appearances and consultancy work for other restaurants. In 2004 Blunos took over as head chef of the Lygon Arms in Broadway, Worcestershire, gaining it a Michelin star and two AA Rosettes in 2005. His two-year contract at the Lygon Arms allowed him the freedom to appear on television and it was agreed that he wouldn't be required at the restaurant every day. He later became executive chef at Hurst House on the Marsh, Laugharne, West Wales, and was executive chef at the Reservoir in Charlton Kings, Cheltenham.

In 2010, Blunos became executive chef for Crown Hotels, owners of restaurants at Whitebrook and Celtic Manor. As part of his appearance at the Frome Cheese Show in September that year, Blunos developed what he hoped to be declared the world's most expensive cheese sandwich. It contained cheddar mixed with white truffles and sprinkled with edible gold dust, and cost £110.59. Crown subsequently began to manage the restaurant at The Parc hotel in Cardiff, owned by Thistle Hotels. The restaurant earned two AA Rosettes, but the partnership between Crown Hotels and Thistle Hotels ended in August 2011. The arrangement between Crown and Blunos ended in 2012 after catering was taken back in-house by Celtic Manor. Later that year, he was appointed as culinary director of the restaurants at the Hogarth Hotel in Dorridge, West Midlands. His appointment was part of a £4 million investment into the hotel by owners Helena and Andy Hogarth. He has also teamed up with the Devon-based Mad About Pies company, which launched a range of Martin Blunos Gastro Pub Pies to be stocked in Co-operative Food stores. It is part of an expansion by the company which looked to increase its production to 10,000 pies a week by the end of May 2012.

In 2016, Blunos became executive chef for Bespoke Hotels, initially at The Talbot Inn, Ripley, Surrey.

Since 2017 he has been based in Bangkok, operating two restaurants, "Blunos" and from 2021 the outdoor rooftop "In The Pink". In 2022 he also became involved with the Crystal Palace, London restaurant "Tell Tale".

=== Television work ===
Blunos now concentrates on consultancy and television work. He is a regular contributing chef on Food Poker and a guest chef on Cooks. He is also associated with Great Food Live, Food Uncut, Saturday Kitchen, The Supersizers Eat... and Iron Chef UK. Prior to appearing on Iron Chef, Blunos watched some episodes of Iron Chef America but thought that the chefs on the British version were equal to their American counterparts. He was the first "Iron Chef" to be selected on the show and appeared in the opening episode. He also had his own show, Tasting Times with Martin Blunos.

Blunos also competed in Iron Chef Thailand several times as a challenger chef, since February 2018. Following his good results as a challenger (2 wins, 2 losses) and his contribution to the development of the program, he has been promoted to the new Iron Chef Thailand since October 2022.

== Personal life ==
Blunos sports a walrus moustache, which the media has stated makes him instantly recognisable. Although he once said that if he was ever to get a short hair cut that he'd remove it, as he was concerned it would leave him looking like a member of the Village People.

His son Max is the drummer for the band Out Like A Lion, and formerly for progressive rock band Zilch. Out Like A Lion played Glastonbury 2010 for BBC introducing; supported Florence and the Machine, The Temper Trap and Example; and been selected for Radio One playlist by Chris Moyles. Blunos enjoys clay pigeon shooting in his spare time, and feels that it enables him to refresh after working in the kitchen. Martin is also a Bristol City F.C. fan.
