= Merrilees Parker =

British celebrity chef and television presenter (born 1971)

- Born: Merrilees Claire Parker; 11 August 1971 (age 55); Westminster, London, England
- Culinary career
- Current restaurants
- The Lansdowne (past); The Greyhound (past); Pink (present, catering)
- Television shows
- Anything You Can Cook (1999); Full on Food (2005); Planet Food (2006); Food Uncut (2006) …Cooks! (2007); Foodistan (2012)

Merrilees Claire Parker (born 11 August 1971) is a British celebrity chef and television presenter. She is mainly known for presenting television programmes combining food and travel (Planet Food and Full on Food) as well as various more traditional cookery programmes. Parker is also known for the menu she presented working for the pub The Lansdowne in Primrose Hill in London.

== Early life ==
Parker had an interest in cooking as a young girl, at which time she helped her grandmother, who is half-Portuguese, in the kitchen.

=== Television presenter ===
In 1996, Parker began her career in television as a researcher on the BBC cookery programme Ready Steady Cook. She also researched for Channel 4.

She began presenting in 1997 on a television programme called Barbecue Bible, in which she was credited as the Home Economist. Parker became a regular as a television chef in 1999 on the BBC series Anything You Can Cook, which she presented together with Brian Turner.

In 2001, she was the regular chef on the BBC day-time show House Call. In 2005, she presented the BBC programme Full on Food, together with Heston Blumenthal and Richard Corrigan. For this programme, she travelled to various cultures to sample their traditional cooking.

For the programme Planet Food, she made several more travel and cookery documentaries in which she visited one country or region per episode, met with interesting local chefs and tasted local foods. Inter alia, she visited the Caribbean, Germany, Japan, Lebanon, Malaysia, and Scandinavia.

Parker also co-presented Orgasmic Organic and Great Food Live. She appeared on Taste, for British Sky Broadcasting, and on Saturday Kitchen, for the BBC.

In 2006, Parker co-presented Food Uncut on UKTV Food with Stefan Gates and Jean-Christophe Novelli. She appeared as a guest chef on Daily Cooks and Saturday Cooks on ITV in 2007, and, in 2008, appeared as a regular contestant on Daily Cooks Challenge. In 2007, she was a judge on the ITV1 cooking show, Soapstar Superchef.

On 10 August 2008, Parker presented a documentary on Channel 4 called 'Kill it Skin it Wear it'.

=== Chef ===
At the age of 17, Parker worked as a chalet girl in France, where she impressed the chef. Upon returning to the UK, Parker worked for The Eagle which was the first gastropub in London. Later, she opened her own gastropub.

While working for Antony Worrall Thompson's company, Wiz Events, Parker provided consultancy for his restaurants and catered for several events and cookery demonstrations. She now runs her own catering company called Pink, together with Bernadette Fitzpatrick, also of Worrall Thompson's company.

=== Magazines ===
Parker has been contributing to the BBC print magazine Good Food since 2002 and also contributes to Olive.

== Style ==
=== Presenting style ===
In her travel documentaries, she tastes local foods, even if they may sometimes look unappealing to western eyes. She does not believe eating from street restaurants is risky, stating, "if something is cooked in front of you in a hot wok it's less likely to give you food poisoning than something that has been sitting on a lukewarm buffet."

=== Cooking style ===
She emphasises the need to adapt to the target audience, mentioning that for a children's birthday party, she creates food that is visually interesting and fun to eat, rather than being geared towards adult palates. Her company Pink promotes as one of its distinguishing features its range, going from posh clubs via corporate events to children's parties.

== Charity ==
In 2007, Parker joined the Westminster Arctic Challenge. This charity event raised awareness and money for several causes. The participants included several members of parliament, representatives of the charities, and a journalist. The participants went on a challenging sponsored trek to the Arctic on husky-powered sledges.
