= Parveen Ashraf =

British food writer and television chef

- Born: 22 June 1965 (age 59); Bradford, West Yorkshire, England
- Occupation(s): TV Chef, Presenter, Food writer, Author, Newspaper columnist
- Years active: 2008-Present
- Television: Parveen's Indian Kitchen; Saturday Morning with James Martin; Ideal World; Hochanda
- Spouse: Qamar Ashraf (m. 1987)
- Children: 3
- Website: https://www.parveenthespicequeen.com/

Parveen Ashraf (born 22 June 1965) is a British food writer and TV chef of Indian cuisine.

== Biography ==
Ashraf was born in Bradford, West Yorkshire, England, and attended Carlton Bolling College. She spent most of her early career working in education eventually becoming an Ofsted inspector. Whilst working for Ofsted, Ashraf was diagnosed with a tumour and after a year of surgery she decided to leave her job and follow her passion of cooking. She went on to set up her own catering company and taught Indian cooking at adult colleges in East Anglia. In 2010, Ashraf developed her own range of recipes and spice kits to make authentic Indian food and became a regular guest presenter on TV shopping channels Ideal World and Hochanda. Ashraf appeared on the popular channel 4 show, Come Dine with Me, in 2009.

In 2016 her debut cookbook, Parveen The Spice Queen, Step by Step Authentic Indian Cooking was published and she began writing a weekly food column for the Peterborough Telegraph. Ashraf appeared as a guest presenter on Saturday Morning with James Martin in October 2018 showcasing some of her own dishes including 'Onion Bhaji Butty'. Following her success on TV, Ashraf presented Parveen's Indian Kitchen, a 10 part cooking series which aired on ITV in January 2019. The series was later broadcast in India, Norway, France, Australia, Sweden and Israel.

In September 2021, Ashraf was selected as the head judge of the Leicester Curry Awards 2020/21 and dubbed 'Queen of Spice’. Following her success as a Curry Awards Judge, she was invited to be on the first ever all-female judging panel for the 4th Annual Bradford Curry Awards in 2023. In June 2023 Parveen's Family Favourites: Food Cooked With Love, Ashraf's second cookbook based on both classic and fusion dishes was published.

== Personal life ==
Ashraf and her husband, Qamar, a civil engineer and property development manager, married in 1987 and have three children together. Ashraf currently resides in London. Ashraf is an ambassador for Action Medical Research and has also worked closely with The One Family Charity travelling to Nepal to help female victims of human trafficking and abuse.

== Filmography ==
Television

Year	Title	Role	Notes	Channel
2018	Saturday Morning with James Martin	Guest Presenter	1 series	ITV
2019	Parveen’s Indian Kitchen	Presenter	1 series	ITV

== Bibliography ==
- Parveen The Spice Queen, Step by Step Authentic Indian Cooking, FCM Publishing (ISBN 978-0-9956296-2-2, 2017)
- Parveen's Family Favourites: Food Cooked With Love, FCM Publishing (ISBN 1914529669, 2023)
