= Dominic De Sousa =

Media publisher (1959–2015)

Dominic de Sousa
- Born: 1959; Kenya
- Died: December 16, 2015 (aged 55–56); Dubai, United Arab Emirates
- Occupation: Publisher
- Years active: ? to 2015
- Known for: Founder of CPI

Dominic de Sousa (1959–2015) was a media publisher in Dubai. He headed the CPI Group, a publishing company that was the umbrella organization of at least 25 magazines.

== Background ==
De Sousa was born in Kenya to Portuguese Goan parents. He moved to London around the age of eleven and he began his education there. His path took him through Biochemistry to music and retail. He later found work with Reed Business Publishing. Through that company, he came into contact with people who founded ITP, and with a couple of years of its founding he was employed there. Leaving ITP, he and a business partner founded CPI. With some help from two silent partners, he later bought out his partner and then at a later stage, he bought out his silent partners. He then had sole control of the company. In 2005 and at the age of 45, he had been in Dubai for fifteen years. He was described as larger-than-life, charismatic, a visionary and a dynamic character. De Sousa was well known for singing at business events. The daily newspaper, The National which is published in Abu Dhabi, United Arab Emirates said that he will remain a legend in the region's publishing industry.

== Career ==
Prior to his involvement in media, he managed a Tandy Electronics shop. He also played guitar in a band called Black Velvet, a band that covered music such as Santana to pop and rock and performed on cruise ships and night clubs. According to De Sousa, the group was successful enough to consider forming its own record label, but the band's manager absconded with the group's money and used it to buy a house.

In 1991, along with a friend Eileen Michael, he was involved in the founding the CPI Media Group, which would eventually be the publisher of 25 magazines. After some buying out and later maneuvering, he would eventually be the companies' sole owner.

In September 2015, proposed the idea of a new magazine, Goodbye, which was to focus on deceased celebrities. The project never came to fruition.

De Sousa was involved in business events right up until his death in Dubai where he was hosting the BBC Good Food Awards in 2015.

== Death ==
De Sousa died at the Jumeirah Zabeel Saray hotel on December 16, 2015, while hosting the BBC Good Food awards there. He spoke to James Martin, the host of Saturday Kitchen, before he went on stage to introduce the BBC Good Food Award show and also perform what he loved best, singing. He sang the Beatles song ‘Hey Jude’ and dropped with a fatal heart attack.
