= Ching He Huang =

Food writer and TV chef

Ching-He Huang MBE
- Born: Chinese: 黃瀞億; pinyin: Huáng Jìngyì; 8 April 1978 (age 48); Tainan, Taiwan
- Education: Queen Mary University of London, Bocconi Business School
- Spouse: Jamie Cho
- Culinary career
- Cooking style: Chinese cuisine, British Chinese cuisine
- Website: www.ChingHeHuang.com

Ching-He Huang (Chinese: 黃瀞億; pinyin: Huáng Jìngyì; Wade–Giles: Huang^{2} Ching^{4}-i^{4}; born 8 April 1978), often known in English simply as Ching, is a Taiwanese-born British food writer and TV chef. She has appeared in a variety of television cooking programmes, and is the author of nine best-selling cookbooks. Ching is recognized as a foodie entrepreneur, having created her own food businesses. She has become known for Chinese cookery internationally through her TV programmes, books, noodle range, tableware range, and involvement in many campaigns and causes.

== Early life ==
Born in Tainan, Taiwan, Ching spent most of her early childhood (up to age six) in South Africa, before her parents moved to London, England, when she was 11 years old. Educated at Queen Mary and Westfield College of the University of London, England, and Bocconi Business School in Milan, Italy, Ching graduated with a first class economics degree and set up her own food businesses, Fuge Foods, which was dissolved in 2014 with final abbreviated accounts for the year ended 30 June 2008.

== Broadcasting career ==
Ching is known for her appearances on various cookery programmes, including ITV's Saturday Cooks and Daily Cooks, and UKTV's Great Food Live.. She is a regular guest on the BBC's Saturday Kitchen hosted by Matt Tebbutt (and previously hosted by James Martin). She hosted Saturday Kitchen in 2016. She makes regular guest appearances on ITV's This Morning and Lorraine. She has appeared on Food and Drink hosted by Tom Kerridge, ITV's John and Lisa's Weekend Kitchen, Channel 4's Sunday Brunch, CBBC's The Munch Box, BBC's Christmas Kitchen and Spring Kitchen, Channel 4's Weekend Kitchen with Waitrose, UK Food's Market Kitchen, as well as guest appearances on Ready Steady Cook and Cooking the Books. Ching has cooked live for Melanie Sykes on Grand Designs Live. She appeared as an occasional guest on Sky Television food show Taste, hosted by Beverley Turner.

In the US, Ching is a regular guest on the NBC's The Today Show, as well as a guest on The Rachael Ray Show on CBS. She has been a judge on Iron Chef America on the Food Network primetime. She has also been a guest judge on Poland's Top Chef.

Ching has hosted eleven international television programmes, her first being Ching's Kitchen, which was originally shown on UKTV Food in 2006.

In 2008, Ching hosted the thirteen-part series Chinese Food Made Easy for BBC Two. This series was subsequently licensed to The Cooking Channel (USA), New Zealand, Germany, Iceland, Poland, Australia, and Belgium, and was also allocated to the BBC's Lifestyle channel for all its Asian feeds, including China, Hong Kong SAR, Republic of China, Singapore, and Korea.

In 2010, Ching hosted a new thirteen part cookery series on Five. The series Chinese Food in Minutes was based on her book 'Ching's Chinese Food in Minutes', published by HarperCollins in September 2009. It included a branded microsite, with video, recipes, episode guides, and competitions, plus additional exclusive content websites.

In 2011, her thirteen-episode series Easy Chinese San Francisco by Ching He Huang debuted on the Cooking Channel.

Ching returned to BBC Two in 2012 for Exploring China: A Culinary Adventure, which showed her travelling and exploring China's culinary culture with Cantonese chef Ken Hom. There is an accompanying book to the series. Ching has described this as her most enjoyable television production.

Ching has hosted other television shows and series including Easy Chinese: New York and LA (2012) Easy Chinese: New Year Special San Francisco(2013), Restaurant Redemption (2013 and 2014), The Big Eat, for the Food Network UK (2015) and Ching's Amazing Asia (2015).

Ching-He Huang was appointed Member of the Most Excellent Order of the British Empire (MBE) in the 2020 Birthday Honours for services to the culinary arts.

== Publications ==
Ching-He Huang launched Click & Cook, an online video recipe library, offering exclusive step-by-step nutritious Chinese fusion recipes for people to cook themselves at home.

In 2006, she published her first recipe book, China Modern: 100 cutting-edge, fusion-style recipes for the 21st century (pub: Kyle Cathie), which contained a variety of Chinese influenced recipes.

In 2008, she published a second recipe book to accompany a six-part peak time television series Chinese Food Made Easy, commissioned and shown by BBC Two and BBC HD. Chinese Food Made Easy aired in June 2008, and was an instant success, attracting millions of viewers. Her book, also called Chinese Food Made Easy, was published alongside the series, and was a number one best-seller for six weeks.

Chings's third book, Ching's Chinese Food in Minutes, was published on 3 September 2009.

In 2011, Ching's Fast Food (UK edition), and the US version Ching's Everyday Easy Chinese were released featuring her most memorable childhood experiences, intertwined with Chinese superstition, etiquette, and original suggestions for exciting variations on classic recipes.

In 2012, Exploring China: A Culinary Adventure was published. The book accompanied the BBC TV series, following Ching and 'godfather' of Cantonese cooking, Ken Hom, as they travelled and explored China's culinary culture.

In March 2015, Ching released Eat Clean: Wok Yourself to Health for Harper Thorsons, promising simple, nutritious dishes that will detoxify and nourish your body.

In September 2017, Ching released Stir Crazy: 100 deliciously healthy wok recipes for Kyle Books. Promising simple, nutritious dishes, it won best UK Chinese Cookery Book at the Gourmand Awards 2018.

In September 2019, Ching released Wok On: deliciously balanced Asian meals in 30 minutes or less for Kyle Books, containing delicious balanced Asian meals in 30 minutes or less. This won best UK Chinese Cookery book at the Gourmand Awards 2020.

In February 2021, Ching released her tenth book, Asian Green, for Kyle Books. The book contains everyday plant-based recipes inspired from across Asia to create simple, healthy, vegan dishes that everyone can enjoy.

== Other writing ==
Ching has written for several food magazines, such as Olive, and Delicious. Her magazine contributions include a red carpet report from the Emmy's for Grazia, BBC Good Food, Women's Health, BA Highlife, Jamie, OK!, Hello!, Sainsbury’s, Stella at The Sunday Telegraph, The Sun TV, Metropolitan Global Times, Chinese Weekly, Vegetarian Living, Which?, Healthy Living Magazine, and The Mayfair Times.

== Awards ==
- Chinese Food Made Easy won the award for Second Best Chinese cuisine book in the world at the Gourmand World Cookbook Awards 2009.
- Chinese Food in Minutes won the award for 3rd Best Chinese cuisine book in the world at the Gourmand World Cookbook Awards 2010.
- Chinese Food Made Easy 2011 NAMIC Vision Awards Winner – Lifestyle Category
- Best Food Broadcast Award for BBC 2's Exploring China: A Culinary Adventure at the 2013 Guild of Food Writers Awards.
- Best Culinary Host nominee for Cooking Channel's Easy Chinese in Daytime Emmy Awards 2013.
- Gourmand Award 2013 for BBC 2's Exploring China: A Culinary Adventure.
- Stir Crazy won the award for the Best Chinese cuisine book in the UK at the Gourmand World Cookbook Awards 2018.
- Wok On won the award for Best Chinese cuisine book in the UK at the Gourmand World Cookbook Awards 2020.
- Guinness World Record for participation for an online sandwich making relay by Al Roker and friends on NBC's Today Show on 6 August 2020.
- In the 2020 Birthday Honours, Queen Elizabeth II made Ching a Member of the Most Excellent Order of the British Empire (MBE), for services to the Culinary Arts.

== Personal life ==
Ching-He Huang lives with her husband, actor Jamie Cho, in Surrey.

== Published works ==
=== Books ===
- China Modern: 100 cutting-edge, fusion-style recipes for the 21st century. London: Kyle Cathie. 2006. ISBN 978-1-85626-673-4.
- Chinese Food Made Easy: 100 simple, healthy recipes from easy-to-find ingredients. London: HarperCollins. 2008. ISBN 978-0-00-726498-8. OCLC 851769953.
- Ching's Chinese Food in Minutes. HarperCollins. 2009. ISBN 978-0-00-726500-8.
- Ching's Chinese Food Made Easy (paperback). HarperCollins. April 2011. ISBN 978-0-00-726499-5.
- Ching's Fast Food: 110 quick and healthy Chinese favourites. HarperCollins. April 2011. ISBN 978-0-00-742627-0. OCLC 879330911.
- Ching's Everyday Easy Chinese: more than 100 quick & healthy Chinese recipes. New York: William Morrow Cookbooks. 4 October 2011. ISBN 978-0-06-207749-3.
- Exploring China: A Culinary Adventure. London. BBC Books. 7 Jun 2012. ISBN 978-1-84990-498-8. OCLC 779245900
- Eat Clean: Wok Yourself to Health: a revolutionary East-West approach to eating well. London: Harper Thorsons. 26 March 2015. ISBN 978-0-00-742629-4. OCLC 920666891.
- Stir Crazy: 100 deliciously healthy wok recipes. London: Kyle Books. 11 September 2017. ISBN 978-0857834263.
- Wok On: deliciously balanced Asian meals in 30 minutes or less. London: Kyle Books. 26 September 2019. ISBN 978-0857836335. OCLC 1083579987.
- Asian Green. London: Kyle Books. 21 January 2021. ISBN 978-0857836342. OCLC 1140724414.
- Wok for Less: Budget-Friendly Asian Meals in 30 Minutes or Less. London: Kyle Books. 4 January 2024. ISBN 978-1804191590.

=== E-books ===
- The Handbook of Chinese Linguistics (e-book). Chichester: Wiley-Blackwell. 2014. ISBN 9780470655344. OCLC 905563884.

=== Videos ===
- Chinese Food in Minutes (2 videodiscs). Australia: Direct Holdings / Time Life. 2010. OCLC 727838421.
- Exploring China: a culinary adventure (DVD). Australia: Madman. 2013. ISBN 9322225190467. OCLC 908172824.

== See also ==
- BBC Food
- List of cooking shows
