= Clementine cake =

Cake flavored primarily with clementines

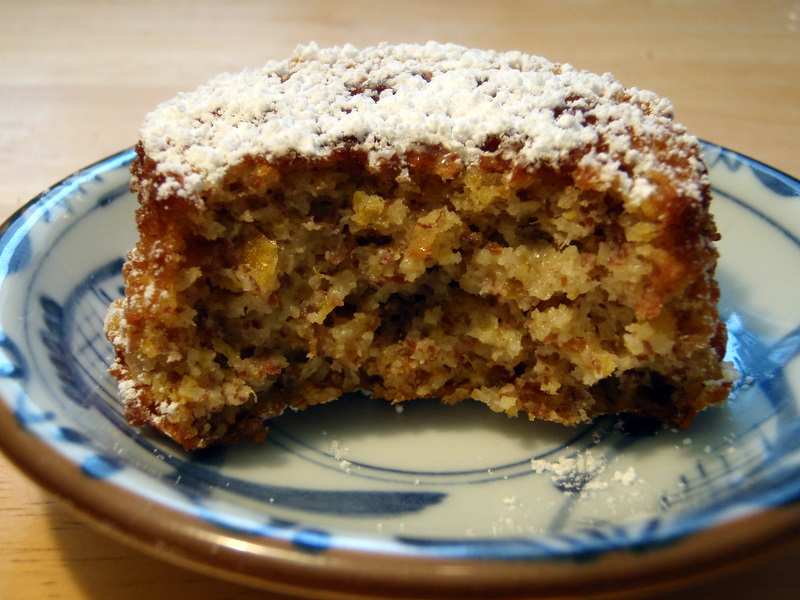
- Clementine cupcake, cut open
- Type: Cake
- Course: Dessert
- Created by: Possibly originated from an orange cake developed by the Sephardi Jews
- Serving temperature: Cold or warmed
- Main ingredients: Whole unpeeled clementine fruit, almond flour, butter, eggs, sugar
- Ingredients generally used: baking powder
- Variations: wheat flour
- Similar dishes: Fruitcake

Clementine cake is a flourless cake flavored primarily with whole unpeeled clementines and almonds. It may originate from an orange cake in Sephardic cuisine.

== Ingredients ==
Clementine cake is prepared with clementines, ground almonds or almond meal, sugar, butter, and eggs. Some recipes call for flour, but the cake is typically flourless.

Optional ingredients include orange juice, Orange Muscat, milk, white dessert wine, or Riesling wine, orange oil or tangerine oil (or both), almond extract and vanilla extract. Other variations exist.

== Preparation ==
The cake is typically prepared by boiling the whole unpeeled clementines, removing any seeds, and pureeing the whole fruit, then combining the pulped fruit with ground almonds or almond flour, eggs, butter, sugar, and baking powder before baking. The almonds used can be toasted or blanched.

Candied clementine slices are often used as a garnish. Other finishes include sweet toppings such as a glaze or powdered sugar.

Clementine cake is dense and moist, and its flavor may improve a day or more after preparation, because the ingredients intermingle and coalesce to enhance its flavor as it ages. After preparation, it can be frozen to preserve it.

Preparation
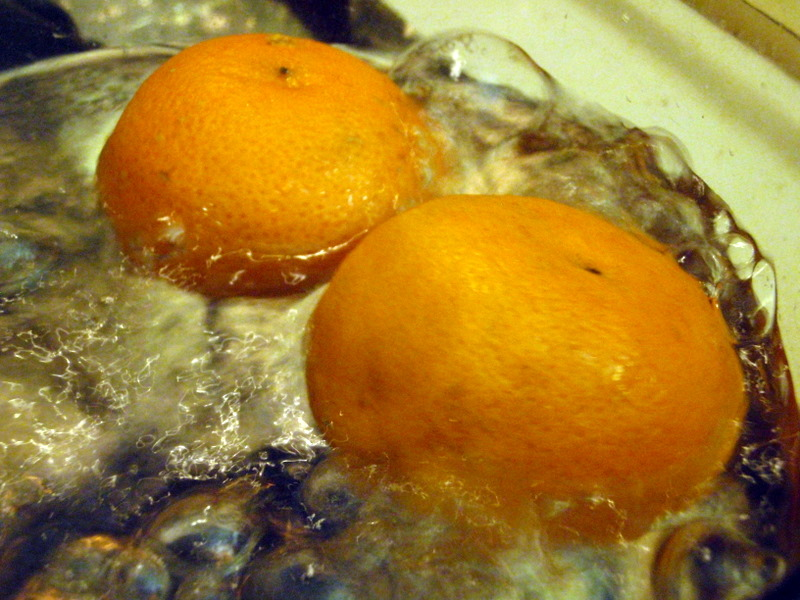
Boiling the whole fruit

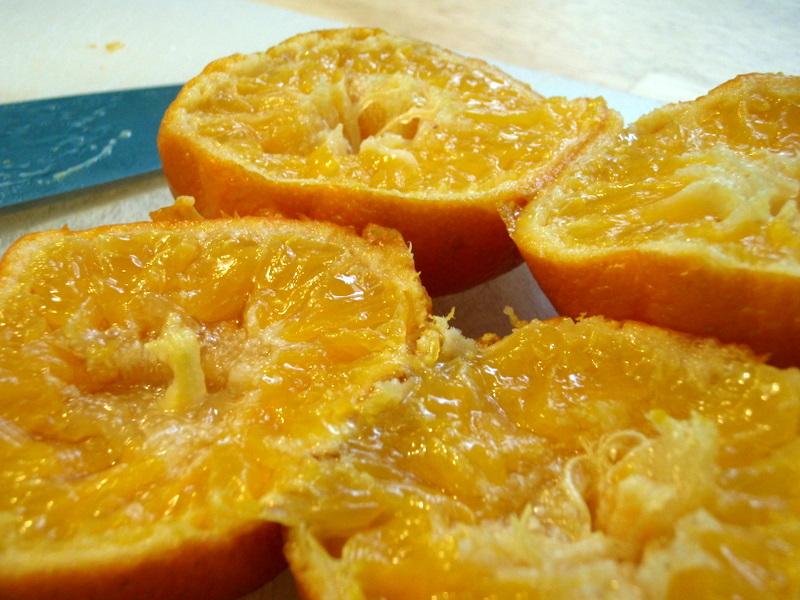
Fruit after boiling

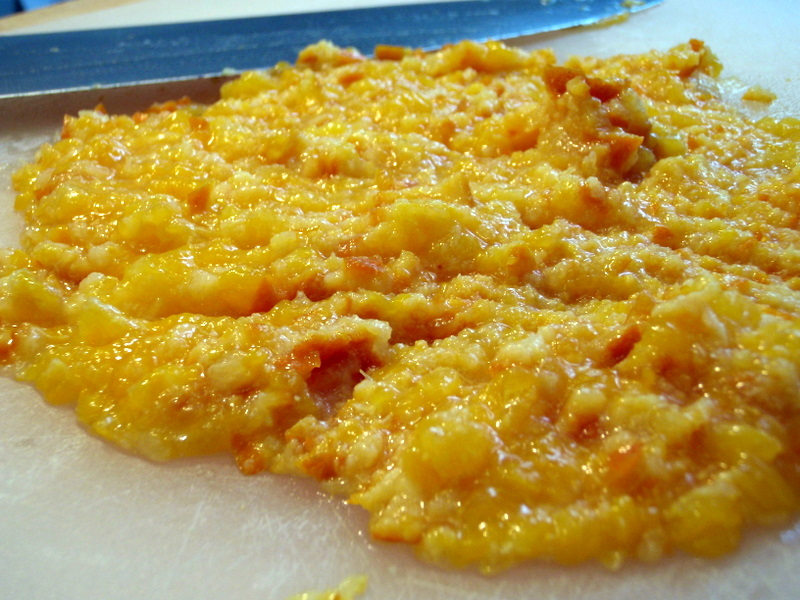
Pureed whole boiled fruit

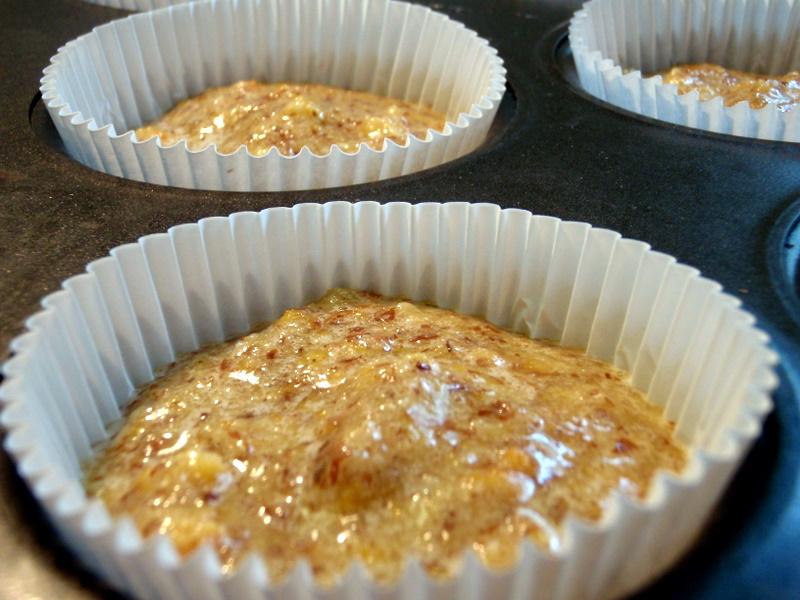
Prepared batter in cupcake wrappers

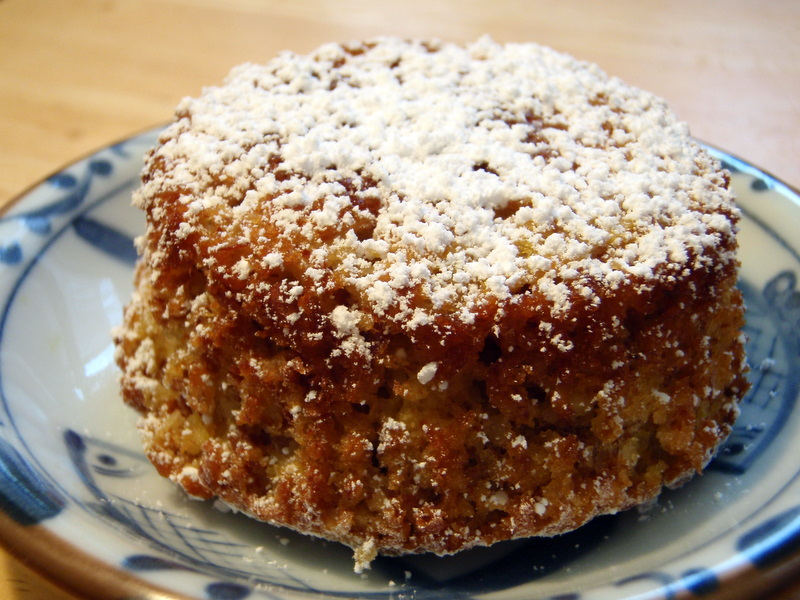
Finished clementine cupcake

== Variations ==
It can also be prepared as an upside-down cake. Cupcakes are a common variation.

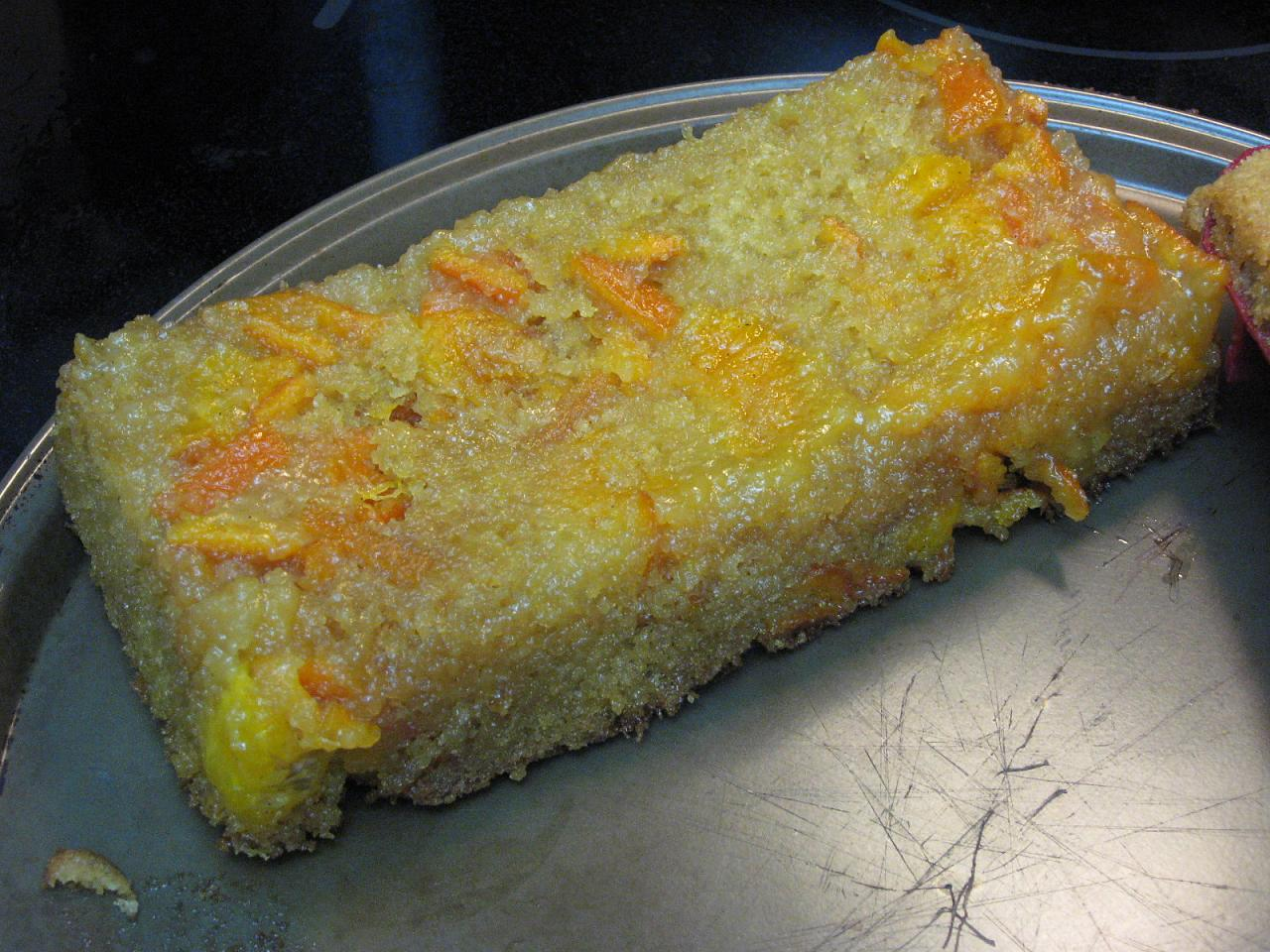
A slice of vanilla clementine cake

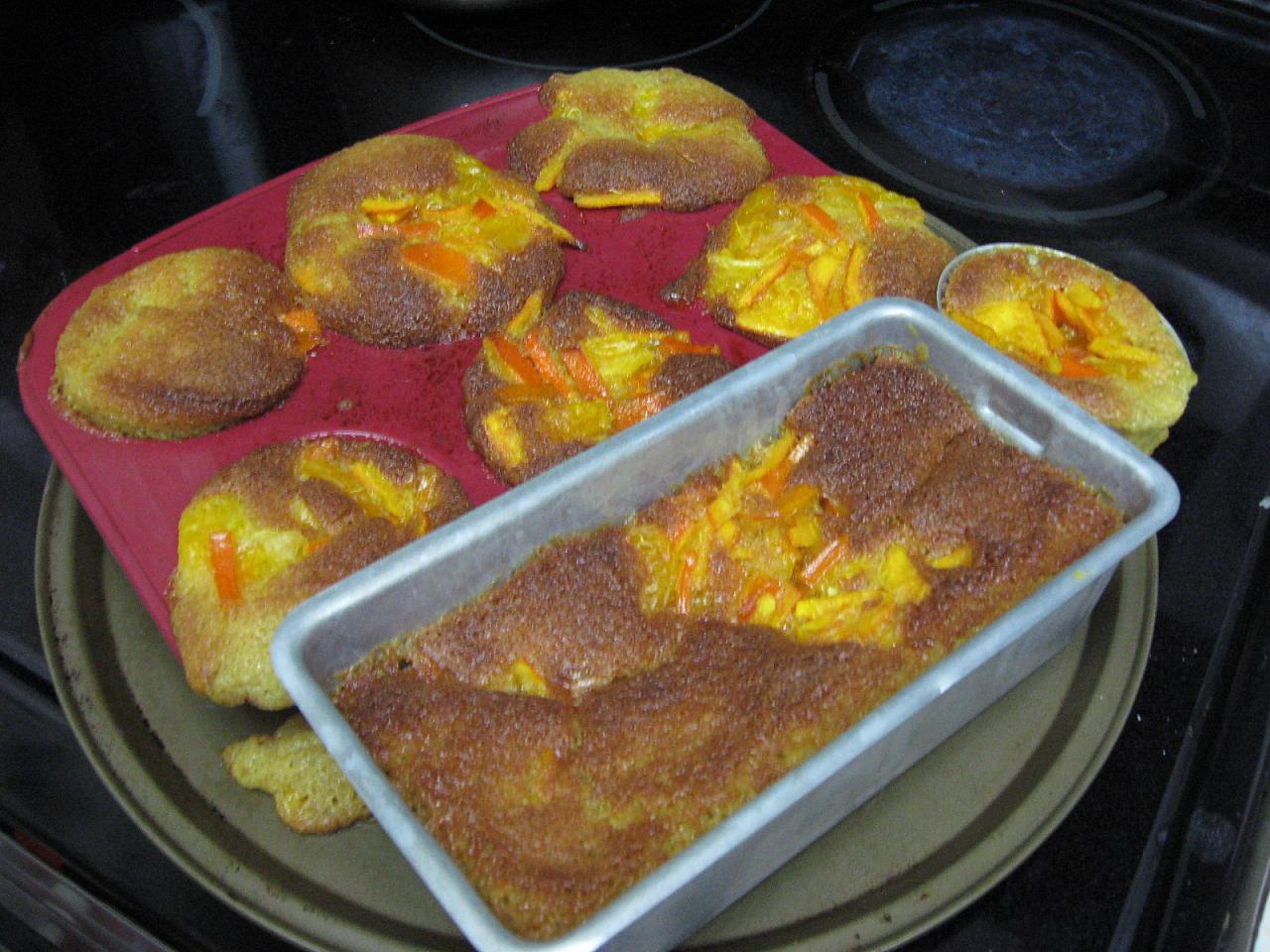
Vanilla clementine cake and cupcakes

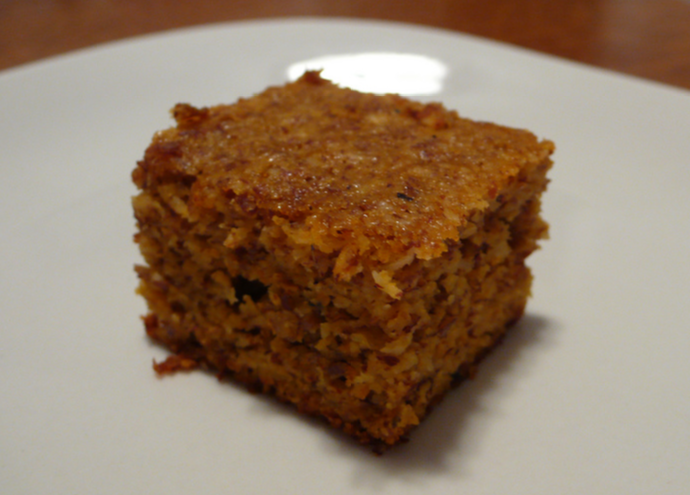
A slice of clementine cake

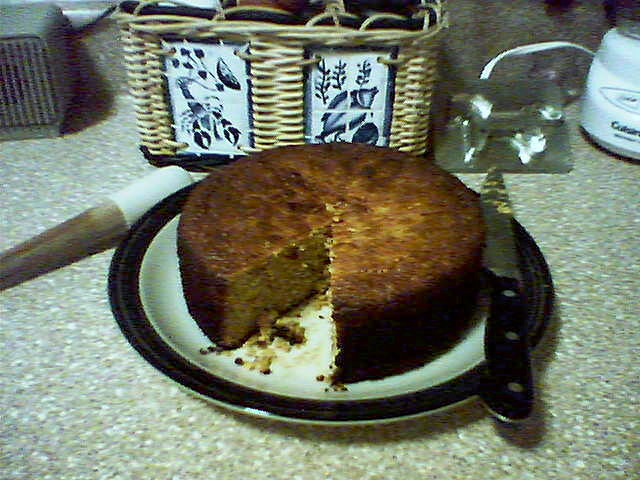
Clementine cake

== History ==
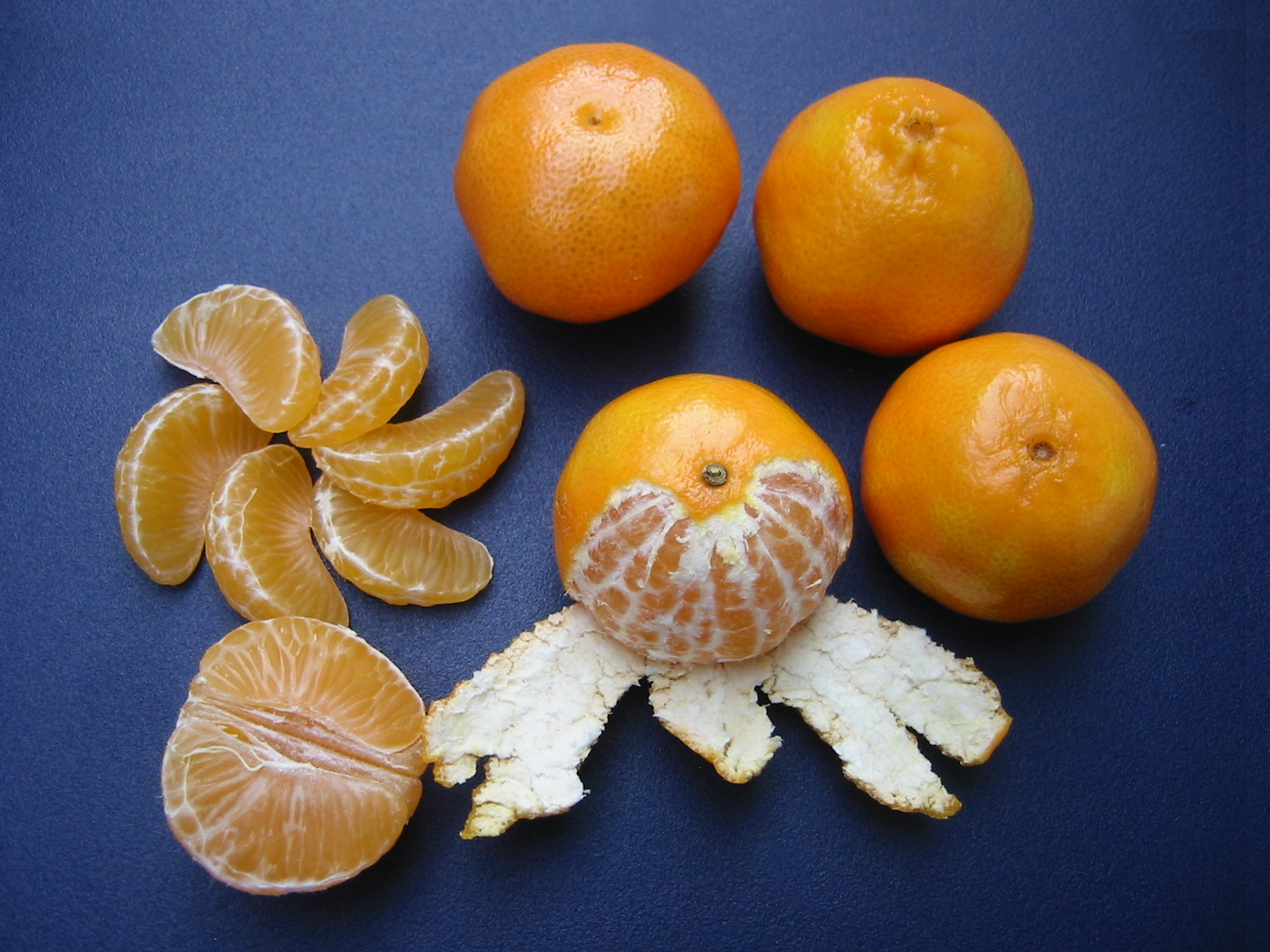
Whole, peeled, halved and sectioned clementines

Clementine cake is probably related to a Sephardic orange cake. Sephardic Jews popularized citrus cultivation in the Mediterranean region in the 15th century and popularized the use of orange in baked goods. In addition to its Iberian flavors, the cake also has North African and Spanish roots.

Claudia Roden, writing for The Guardian, said that she'd traced the evolution of the dish, which she describes as a Sephardic passover dish, "from Andalucia, through Portugal and Livorno in Italy, to Aleppo". The New Yorker said that Roden's recipe had been adapted by so many other cook book writers that Roden had lost count.

== Recognition and importance ==
According to the San Francisco Chronicle, Joyce Goldstein called it a "classic Judeo-Spanish cake". In 2020, Jill Dupleix, writing for the Sydney Morning Herald, called it "the now famous, never-bettered, flourless Sephardic cake". Nigella Lawson called Roden's recipe "magnificent" and created an adaptation. In 2021, Cook's Country said the cake was "having a moment".

== In popular culture ==
Clementine cake played a minor part in the plot of the 2013 film The Secret Life of Walter Mitty, and was included in the opening scene of the film and a few additional scenes.

== See also ==
- Fruitcake
- List of cakes
- List of desserts
- List of fruit dishes
