= Iron Chef UK =

2010 British television series

- Genre: Cooking show
- Directed by: Jonathan Bullen
- Presented by: Olly Smith; Nick Nairn
- Starring: Tom Aikens; Martin Blunos; Sanjay Dwivedi; Judy Joo
- Country of origin: United Kingdom
- Original language: English
- No. of seasons: 1
- No. of episodes: 25

Production
- Executive producer: Adam MacDonald
- Running time: 60 minutes
- Production company: IWC Media

Original release
- Network: Channel 4
- Release: 26 April – 17 December 2010

Related
- Iron Chef; Iron Chef America

Iron Chef UK is a British competition-based cooking show based on Fuji Television's Iron Chef and Food Network's Iron Chef America. It was produced by IWC Media and broadcast on Channel 4 in 2010.

== Summary ==
The show aired during daytime, five days a week at 5 p.m. in 2010, and was hosted by Olly Smith and Nick Nairn. The four Iron Chefs were Tom Aikens, Martin Blunos, Sanjay Dwivedi and Judy Joo. Like the original Iron Chef, the competitions were held in Kitchen Stadium and presided over by the Chairman. Judging occurred in two rounds, with the first round being appetisers, and the second being the main courses. Two challengers prepared an appetiser each, while professional chefs, the Iron Chefs prepared two dishes. They were judged, and the scores for the challenging team versus the Iron Chef were announced. Then the second half of the team and the Iron Chef returned to the kitchen to prepare the main course. The two challengers each prepared a dish and the Iron Chef prepared two. Judging resumed, and results announced. As well as announcing whether the Challenging team, or the Iron Chef won, the best dish from the challenging team was also announced. The challengers with the best dish returned on the following Friday to compete with the best Iron Chef of the week. Dishes were scored out of 25—15 for taste, 5 for design, and 5 for originality in the use of the special ingredient.

The first episode aired on 26 April 2010. Liz Moore from Northern Ireland was the first finalist.

== Internationally ==
The show has been seen worldwide by countries including India, Finland, New Zealand, Belgium, Netherlands, and Luxembourg.

== The Iron Chefs ==
Iron Chef	Number of wins	Number of losses	Average score	Highest score	Lowest score	Percentage
Tom Aikens	5	1	22.3	25	18.5	83%
Judy Joo	4	1	20.0	24.75	13.5	80%
Sanjay Dwivedi	3	0	18.5	22.5	14.5	100%
Martin Blunos	2	2	18.1	21.5	14	50%
