= Food Uncut =

British television series

Food Uncut is a programme on UKTV Food (formerly UKTV Bright Ideas before it was renamed to Dave). It was presented by Merrilees Parker, Stefan Gates and Jean-Christophe Novelli, with Olly Smith as a guest presenter and resident food and wine expert.
