= List of celebrities appearing on Daily Cooks Challenge =

Several celebrities have appeared on the ITV cookery show, Daily Cooks Challenge. The following is a list of such appearances.

== Season 1 ==
Episode	Celebrity	Date of first airing
1	Matt Dawson	24 March 2008
2	Connie Fisher	25 March 2008
3	Nancy Dell'Olio	26 March 2008
4	Angela Griffin	27 March 2008
5	Nicki Chapman	28 March 2008
6	Andrea McLean	31 March 2008
7	Dame Kelly Holmes	1 April 2008
8	Jason Gardiner	2 April 2008
9	Sue Cleaver	3 April 2008
10	Graeme Le Saux	4 April 2008
11	Cerys Matthews	7 April 2008
12	Jenni Falconer	8 April 2008
13	Sally Whittaker	9 April 2008
14	Eamonn Holmes; Ruth Langsford	10 April 2008
15	Barry McGuigan	11 April 2008
16	Anthea Turner	14 April 2008
17	Nancy Sorrell	15 April 2008
18	Tim Vincent	16 April 2008
19	Ben Miller	17 April 2008
20	Melinda Messenger	18 April 2008

== Season 2 ==
Episode	Celebrity	Date of first airing
1	Tony Audenshaw	30 June 2008
2	Brendan Cole	1 July 2008
3	Jane McDonald	2 July 2008
4	Linda Barker	3 July 2008
5	Gary Lucy	4 July 2008
6	Julie Etchingham	7 July 2008
7	Malcolm Hebden	8 July 2008
8	Matt Willis	9 July 2008
9	Toyah Willcox	10 July 2008
10	Richard Arnold	11 July 2008
11	Sherrie Hewson	14 July 2008
12	Joe Pasquale	15 July 2008
13	Dominic Brunt	16 July 2008
14	Josie d'Arby	17 July 2008
15	Toby Anstis	18 July 2008
16	Debra Stephenson	21 July 2008
17	Alison Hammond	22 July 2008
18	Fay Ripley	23 July 2008
19	Wendy Richard	24 July 2008
20	Lucy-Jo Hudson	25 July 2008
21	Aggie MacKenzie	28 July 2008
22	Les Dennis	29 July 2008
23	Carol Smillie	30 July 2008
24	Phil Tufnell	31 July 2008
25	Suranne Jones	1 August 2008
26	Adele Silva	4 August 2008
27	Lisa Maxwell	5 August 2008
28	Mica Paris	6 August 2008
29	Tamara Beckwith	7 August 2008
30	Andrew Castle	8 August 2008
31	Tupele Dorgu	11 August 2008
32	Siân Lloyd	12 August 2008
33	Brian Blessed	13 August 2008
34	Stuart Manning	14 August 2008
35	Sinitta	15 August 2008
36	Matt Di Angelo	18 August 2008
37	Richard Underwood	19 August 2008
38	Angellica Bell	20 August 2008
39	Colin Jackson	21 August 2008
40	Ruth Jones	22 August 2008
41	Terri Dwyer	25 August 2008
42	Mark Charnock	26 August 2008
43	Nell McAndrew	27 August 2008
44	David Ford	28 August 2008
45	Vanessa Feltz	29 August 2008

== Season 3 ==
Episode	Celebrity	Date of first airing
1	Anne Diamond	22 June 2009
2	Jennie McAlpine	23 June 2009
3	Sharron Davies	24 June 2009
4	Jonathan Ansell	25 June 2009
5	Clare Buckfield	26 June 2009
6	Ann Widdecombe	29 June 2009
7	Lionel Blair	30 June 2009
8	Craig Phillips	1 July 2009
9	June Sarpong	2 July 2009
10	Carol McGiffin	3 July 2009
11	Edwina Currie	6 July 2009
12	Mel Giedroyc	7 July 2009
13	Raef Bjayou	8 July 2009
14	Stefan Booth	9 July 2009
15	Tommy Walsh	10 July 2009
16	David Grant	13 July 2009
17	Claire Sweeney	14 July 2009
18	Danny Wallace	15 July 2009
19	Shane Lynch	16 July 2009
20	Tina Hobley	17 July 2009
21	Graeme Hawley	20 July 2009
22	Leslie Ash	21 July 2009
23	Hannah Waterman	22 July 2009
24	Zoe Tyler	23 July 2009
25	John McCririck	24 July 2009
26	Mark Foster	27 July 2009
27	Amanda Barrie	28 July 2009
28	Samantha Fox	29 July 2009
29	Sally Gunnell	30 July 2009
30	Dermot Murnaghan	31 July 2009
31	Linda Robson	3 August 2009
32	Donal MacIntyre	4 August 2009
33	Andi Peters	5 August 2009
34	Tony Blackburn	6 August 2009
35	Gaby Roslin	7 August 2009
36	Anneka Rice	10 August 2009
37	Jennie Bond	11 August 2009
38	Stephen K Amos	12 August 2009
39	Su Pollard	13 August 2009
40	Duncan James	14 August 2009
41	Konnie Huq	17 August 2009
42	Mark Durden Smith	18 August 2009
43	Esther Rantzen	19 August 2009
44	John Stapleton	20 August 2009
45	Liz McClarnon	21 August 2009
46	Marian Keyes	24 August 2009
47	Pauline McLynn	25 August 2009
48	Peter Purves	26 August 2009
49	Paul Young	27 August 2009
50	Linda Lusardi	28 August 2009

== Season 4 ==
[1]

Episode	Celebrity	Date of first airing
1	Carol Vorderman	29 March 2010
2	Larry Lamb	30 March 2010
3	Lucy Porter	31 March 2010
4	Tony Hadley	1 April 2010
5	Carrie Grant	2 April 2010
6	Lucy Benjamin	3 April 2010
7	Charlie Boorman	6 April 2010
8	Jodie Prenger	7 April 2010
9	Ben Shepherd	8 April 2010
10	James Dreyfus	9 April 2010
11	Christine Hamilton	12 April 2010
12	Stephen Mulhern	13 April 2010
13	Ruthie Henshall	14 April 2010
14	Craig Revel Horwood	15 April 2010
15	Jayne Middlemiss	16 April 2010
16	Greg Rusedski	19 April 2010
17	Lisa Faulkner	20 April 2010
18	Gavin Esler	21 April 2010
19	Chris Packham	22 April 2010
20	John Thomson	23 April 2010
21	Rav Wilding	26 April 2010
22	Jo Wood	27 April 2010
23	Dom Joly	28 April 2010
24	Paul Ross	29 April 2010
25	Shazia Mirza	30 April 2010
26	Christopher Biggins	3 May 2010
27	Denise Lewis	4 May 2010
28	Diarmuid Gavin	5 May 2010
29	Camilla Dallerup	6 May 2010
30	Kim Wilde	7 May 2010
31	Calum Best	10 May 2010
32	Eve Pollard	11 May 2010
33	Todd Carty	12 May 2010
34	Iwan Thomas	13 May 2010
35	Gloria Hunniford	14 May 2010
36	Zöe Salmon	17 May 2010
37	Laila Rouass	18 May 2010
38	Ricky Groves	19 May 2010
39	Kim Woodburn	20 May 2010
40	Trisha Goddard	21 May 2010
