= Chinese Food Made Easy =

British cooking show

- Presented by: Ching He Huang (host)
- Country of origin: United Kingdom
- No. of episodes: 6

Production
- Running time: 30 minutes

Original release
- Network: BBC Two
- Release: 7 July – 11 August 2008

Chinese Food Made Easy is a six-part cooking show on television commissioned and shown by BBC Two and BBC HD in 2008. It was presented by Ching He Huang.

== Overview ==
The series presents Ching's versions of Chinese food, including Sichuan (Szechuan) food, noodles, dim sum, seafood, fast food, desserts, and celebratory food, where she presents a complete banquet.

== Episodes ==
In the first episode of the series, Ching teaches the rower Katherine Grainger how to cook a healthy version of sweet and sour pork. In another episode, Ching presents a Chinese-style version of fish and chips.

Many of the ingredients she uses are grown or made in the UK, for example, chilies from Chorley, tofu from Melton Mowbray, soy sauce from Wales and pak choi from Preston.

== Broadcasts ==
Chinese Food Made Easy has been licensed to the Cooking Channel (USA) and networks in New Zealand, Germany, Iceland, Poland, and Australia. BBC's Lifestyle channel offers it on its Asian feeds, including China, Hong Kong, Taiwan, Singapore, and Korea.

== Publications ==
A recipe book called Chinese Food Made Easy accompanies the series.
