= Lettonie (restaurant) =

Coordinates: 51.39089°N 2.40256°W

- Interactive map of Lettonie

Restaurant information
- Established: 1988; 38 years ago
- Closed: September 2001; 24 years ago
- Chef: Martin Blunos
- Food type: French cuisine
- Rating: Michelin stars (1994–2001)
- Location: Newbridge House, Bath, Somerset, United Kingdom
- Seating capacity: 24 (Bristol); 42 (Bath)

Lettonie was a restaurant owned and run by chef Martin Blunos; it was located in Bristol until 1998 when it relocated to Bath, Somerset. It was awarded a Michelin star in 1992, and a second in 1994; these were held until the restaurant was closed in 2001.

== History ==
Lettonie was first opened by Martin Blunos in Stoke Bishop, Bristol in 1988. The restaurant was named Lettonie; the French word for Latvia. The restaurant could seat 24 diners, but the French cuisine was considered to be at odds with the location – the restaurant was located in a shopping parade. After nine years, the restaurant was relocated under the same name some 11 miles (18 km) to his hometown of Bath, Somerset. While in the second location at Newbridge House, it became a restaurant with rooms. The building was a Grade II listed building. The location had previously been a hotel with 9 bedrooms, but under Blunos, these were reduced to 4, and a 34-seat restaurant and an 8-seat private dining room were installed.

Blunos closed the restaurant after 13 years, with a drop in advanced bookings from the United States blamed due to both the foot-and-mouth outbreak and the September 11 attacks. After the closure of Lettonie in September 2001, Blunos opened Blinis in Bath, two months later. This held two Michelin stars for a single edition of the guide in 2002.

== Menu ==
The menu served at Lettonie was predominantly French in nature, although featured elements of Latvian cuisine. Dishes include a pork belly served with morels and a celeriac purée; at the time, pork belly was an unusual dish to be served in a fine-dining restaurant. Blunos explained that he had originally had a pork tenderloin as well, but since diners preferred the belly dish, the fillet was dropped.

The signature dish of the restaurant was scrambled duck egg, which was flambéed tableside with vodka. This was then topped with Sevruga caviar, and served with both buckwheat and plain blinis as well as chilled vodka. A second dish which Blunos became well known for at Lettonie was one which appeared to be boiled egg and toast soldiers. It was, however, a hollowed out egg filled with vanilla cream and mango coulis. This was then served with shortbread that had been sprinkled with sugar and grated chocolate.

== Reception ==
Lettonie was first awarded a Michelin star in 1992 while located in Bristol. It was awarded a second star in 1994, and retained those when the restaurant moved to Bath in 1998 until it was permanently closed in 2001. In 1999, Harden's restaurant guide listed Lettonie as among the best in the country.
