= Simon Wright (food writer) =

British food writer

Simon Wright is a food writer, broadcaster and restaurateur who was editor of the AA Restaurant Guide and was restaurant consultant for Ramsay's Kitchen Nightmares. In 2010 he won a "Wales the True Taste Champion" award from the Welsh Assembly Government for supporting the Welsh food and drink industry.

Wright rose to public prominence in 2002 when he became involved in a row about Petrus restaurant, co-owned by Gordon Ramsay and his former protégé Marcus Wareing. The restaurant's rating was downgraded at the insistence of Roger Wood, then managing director of the AA. Wood had visited the restaurant before dining there and expressed himself as unsatisfied with the arrangements. Wright objected to Wood's intervention and backed the recommendation of the organisation's professional inspectors. Eventually Wright resigned in protest, leading to coverage in the national press. Following the publicity the decision was reversed and Petrus received the rating originally recommended by its inspectors.

Wright did not rejoin the AA. He wrote several books and produced radio and television programs for BBC Wales.

Wright was a partner in the restaurant Y Polyn in South West Wales. Y Polyn also features on cookery show The Hairy Bikers' Food Tour of Britain.

== The Wright Taste ==
The Wright Taste is a five-part BBC Wales documentary series that started in late October 2008.

The title is a pun on the name of Wright, who featured in the series.

== Radio series ==
Wright later presented Wales on the Menu, a BBC Radio Wales six-part food series.

== Books ==
=== The Wright Taste: Recipes and Other Stories ===
A book was also published by Wales-based Gomer Press. It features recipes from the series along with stories of Wright's experiences tracking his journey from field to fork.
