= Prospect Pictures =

Prospect Pictures

Prospect is an independent TV production company part of production and distribution group DCD Media. Prospect has offices in London. The company produce a wide array of programming for the UK and international markets. Productions range from factual entertainment series and documentaries to long-running daytime shows.

Founded in 1988, Prospect built its reputation through being one of the UK ’s largest suppliers of lifestyle and cookery programming, most notably with ITV1's long-running 'Cooks!' series fronted by celebrity chef Antony Worrall Thompson.

In 2006, Prospect topped the Broadcast magazine "Indies League Table 2006" in the Factual Entertainment category.

In 2011 Prospect Cymru launched a new Topical Programming Unit specializing in current affairs and fast turnaround topical programming. In 2012 Prospect's programmes won 2 BAFTA Wales awards and 4 nominations, BAFTA Television and RTS nominations, and IFTA Irish Film & Television Festival.

== Programmes ==
Notable productions include:

- The Tallest Tower: Building The Shard for Channel 4
- Shirley for BBC Two
- The Hunt for Britain's Metal Thieves for BBC One
- Gipsy Eviction: The Fight for Dale Farm for Dispatches Channel 4
- Misbehaving Mums To Be for BBC Three
- The Passion of Port Talbot for BBC Wales
- Children of 9/11: Revealed for Channel 5
- Tourettes: I Swear I Can't Help It for BBC One
- Daily Cooks Challenge for ITV presented by Antony Worrall Thompson
- Christmas Cooks for ITV presented by Antony Worrall Thompson
- Fix My Fat Head for BBC One
- The RAF at 90' for BBC Two
- Do It Yourself – The Story of Rough Trade for BBC Four
- My Brilliant Britain for Blighty
- There's No Business
