= Bryn Williams =

Welsh chef & restaurateur (born 1977)

Bryn Dwyfor Williams
- Born: 6 June 1977 (age 49); Denbigh, Clwyd, Wales
- Education: Coleg Llandrillo Cymru; Marco Pierre White; Michel Roux Jr
- Culinary career
- Cooking style: Modern British and European
- Current restaurants
- Bryn Williams at Porth Eirias (Colwyn Bay), Bryn Williams at The Cambrian (Swiss Alps), "Bryn Williams yn Theatr Clwyd" (Mold), Touring Club (Penarth).
- Previous restaurant
- Odette's (Primrose Hill)

Bryn Williams (born 6 June 1977) is a chef originally from Denbigh, Wales. He was the head chef and sole proprietor of Odette's Restaurant, Primrose Hill, London.

He is notable for his success in a competition to cook the fish course for the Queen's 80th birthday celebrations on the television programme Great British Menu as a sous-chef. He is now widely regarded as one of Wales' best chefs and one of Britain's new crop of "celebrity" chefs. In June 2015 he opened his bistro, Bryn@Porth Eirias, on the seashore in the north Wales town of Colwyn Bay.

== Biography ==
Bryn Dwyfor Williams was born and raised into a farming family near Denbigh, Wales, with his brothers Gareth and Siôn. His father Eifion, a mechanic, is one of seven children, four of whom became farmers. Gwenda, his mother, is a doctor's receptionist. He received all his education through the medium of Welsh before moving to further education. He attended Ysgol Gynradd Twm o'r Nant, Denbigh (Primary) and Ysgol Uwchradd Glan Clwyd, St Asaph (Secondary). Williams lived in Denbigh until he was 18, then moved to London.

Bryn was Chef Patron of Odette's in Primrose Hill, London, from 2008 until May 2024, when he sold the restaurant to explore new ventures

=== Early years ===
Williams's interest in food began as a young child during a primary school visit to a bakery in Denbigh. He later worked at the same bakery as a teenager on Saturday mornings. He also developed a respect for food whilst growing vegetables, fishing and shooting for game on his uncle's farm in his youth.

After leaving high school at the age of 16, he attended Coleg Llandrillo Cymru – studying catering. In 2009, Williams was appointed Skills Ambassador for the college.

After leaving college and working in Cafe Nicoise in Colwyn Bay, he was encouraged by head chef Carl Swift to take his skills to London. He was taken on by Marco Pierre White at the Criterion.

=== Professional career ===
After three years learning his craft under Marco Pierre White at the Criterion, he was sous chef under the tutelage of another culinary legend, Michel Roux Jr at Le Gavroche for a further three years. In 2001 he had an opportunity to experience European cuisine at first hand, working at the Patisserie Millet in Paris, which is also where the Roux family honed their skills. In the same year, he went on to work at Hotel Negresco, a two Michelin-starred restaurant in Nice.

Back in Britain, Williams moved to the Michelin-starred Orrery Restaurant on Marylebone High Street in London, working there for four years under the tutelage of head chef André Garrett. Whilst working at the Orrery he competed for the Roux Scholarship, having been encouraged to participate by Garrett who was himself a previous winner of the prestigious award. Williams finished second overall that year.

=== Odette's ===
Bryn initially became head chef off Odette's after his Great British Menu win in 2006, then acquired the restaurant outright in October 2008, a restaurant in Primrose Hill. He expanded the restaurant in 2014, adding covers, a private dining area, and a chef's table, and earned three AA Rosettes by upholding a consistent standard of innovation and quality.

In May 2024, he sold Odette's to redirect his focus toward his ventures in Wales and abroad

=== Bryn Williams at Porth Eirias ===
It was announced on 9 September 2013 that Bryn Williams was to open a bistro at a water sports centre on Colwyn Bay promenade. The announcement was made at the official opening of Porth Eirias by First Minister of Wales Carwyn Jones. The bistro opened in June 2015, on Colwyn Bay's promenade, combining seafood and local produce in a casual, scenic setting.

The venue has since been awarded a Michelin Bib Gourmand for its quality and value

=== Bryn Williams at The Cambrian ===
Opened in 2020 at the Cambrian 'Adelboden' hotel in the Swiss Alps, marking Bryn's expansion into international hospitality

=== Touring Club ===
Touring Club opened in Penarth, Wales in June 2023, this small-plates restaurant earned a Michelin Bib Gourmand as well .

=== Bryn Williams yn Theatr Clwyd ===
In 2024 it was announced that Bryn Williams would oversee the food and beverage offering throughout the redeveloped Theatr Clwyd in Mold. Bryn Williams at Theatr Clwyd opened on 6 October 2025.

=== Gorsedd y Beirdd (Gorsedd of Bards) ===
Williams was honoured by the Gorsedd of the Bards at the National Eisteddfod of Wales 2013 festival in his home town of Denbigh, by being chosen a new member of the Eisteddford Druidic Order.

== Media ==
=== Television appearances ===
In 2006, he was a contestant on BBC Two's Great British Menu. Williams interviewed his grandmother about dishes she used to eat as a child before settling on a menu. He beat Angela Hartnett in the regional round, and went on to win the public's vote to cook his fish course of 'Turbot with Oxtail' at Queen Elizabeth's 80th-birthday banquet at Mansion House. He retained his crown when he beat Matt Tebbutt in 2007. He has since become a familiar face on Saturday Kitchen, also making appearances on Something for the Weekend and Market Kitchen.

Williams's first language is Welsh, and he has appeared in several programmes on the Welsh-language television channel, S4C. He was one of three judges on the very popular Welsh-language cooking competition programme Chez / Casa Dudley; the third series started in Autumn 2008.

A six-part series of Cegin Bryn (Bryn's Kitchen) started on S4C in March 2012. The programme is based on his cookbook Bryn's Kitchen and features six key ingredients, cooked in three different ways whilst also tracking their journey from source to plate. The second series of Cegin Bryn quickly followed in January 2013.

Williams cooked live every day in the GMTV kitchen with Myleene Klass during the last week of its 17 years as a breakfast television broadcaster on ITV. GMTV came to an end on 3 September 2010.

=== Radio appearances ===
On 21 March 2010, Williams appeared on Wales on the Menu on BBC Radio Wales, where food critic Simon Wright challenged the Welsh public to attempt to get their dish on Bryn Williams' top London menu. Williams was impressed enough by 23-year-old student Tom Watts Jones and his complex dish of self-caught Welsh rabbit that he offered him a permanent job as a commis chef.

=== Cookbooks ===
Williams published his first book, Bryn's Kitchen, in March 2011. His second book, For The Love of Veg, was published in October 2013. His Welsh language cookbook, Tir a Môr, was published in October 2015.

== Patronage ==
Williams is a Patron of Gwledd Conwy Feast, which is Wales' second-largest food festival with around 25,000 visitors each year.

Cardiff Blues, Wales and British and Irish Lions rugby player Martyn Williams appointed Bryn as one of the 7 Patrons of his Spirit of Wales testimonial year in 2010, to help raise money for vulnerable children and cancer victims. Other Patrons include Ian Woosnam, Ioan Gruffudd and James Dean Bradfield.

Active in mentoring: launched the Bryn Williams Ambassador Programme at Coleg Llandrillo to support hospitality students with mentoring and work‑experience opportunities

Also launched a Bryn Williams Academy at Coleg Cambria—offering students hands-on training across his restaurants

== Personal life ==
He married Sharleen Spiteri, the frontwoman of Scottish band Texas, in September 2018 at the 15th-century church of St. Tyrnog in Llandyrnog, North Wales. The pair have become something of a celebrity couple in their own right. In 2021, they appeared on motoring podcast Fuelling Around discussing their affection for cars and their careers.
