= Sabrina Ghayour =

British-Iranian chef (born 1976)

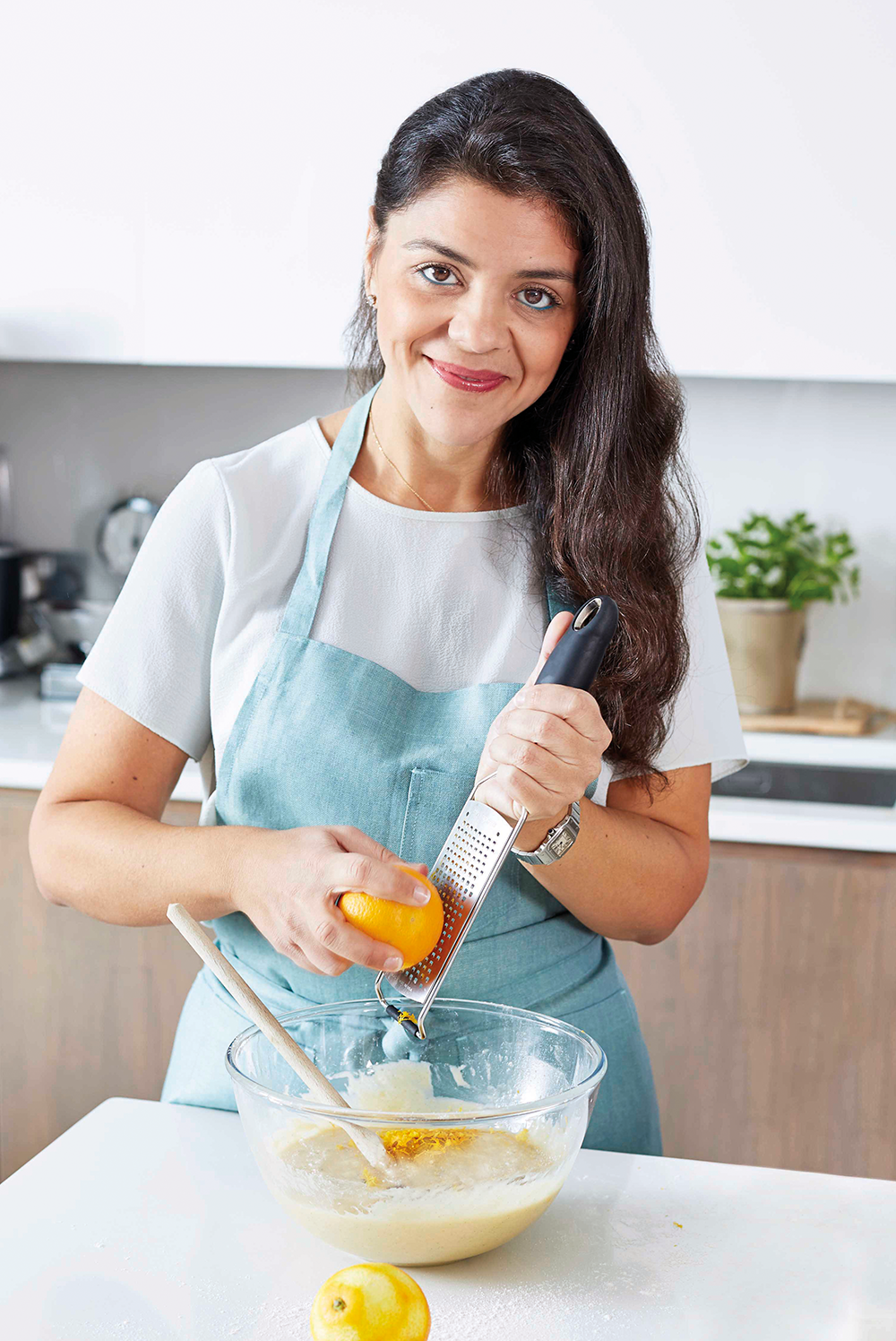
- Born: 5 January 1976 (age 49); Tehran, Iran
- Culinary career
- Cooking style: Middle Eastern cuisine
- Website: www.sabrinaghayour.com

Sabrina Ghayour (born 5 January 1976) is a British-Iranian chef, food writer and author. She is the host of the supper club ‘Sabrina's Kitchen’ and released her first cookbook, Persiana, in May 2014.

== Early life ==
Sabrina Ghayour was born in Tehran, Iran, and moved to west London with her mother at the start of the 1979 Iranian revolution.

== Career ==
After completing her education, Ghayour was employed by restaurateurs such as Ken Hom and worked in corporate catering in the City of London for around fifteen years.

Ghayour teaches Persian and Middle Eastern classes at cookery schools. She has worked as a consultant on menu and product development for corporate firms, retail brands, airlines, caterers and supermarkets.

Ghayour's debut cookbook, Persiana, was released in May 2014. It covers the food and flavours from the regions around the Southern and Eastern shores of the Mediterranean Sea. Although some recipes in the book are authentic, some draw inspiration from the Middle East and combine flavours and ingredients of the region with produce available in supermarkets everywhere. Persiana spent nine weeks on best-seller lists and won The Observer Food Monthly 2014 Best New Cookbook award in October.

Ghayour then published Sirocco (2016) and Feasts (2017). Her fourth book, Bazaar – Vibrant Vegetarian Recipes, was published in 2019.

== Selected works ==
- Persiana: Recipes from the Middle East & Beyond. Mitchell Beazley. 2014. ISBN 9781845339104.
- Sirocco: Fabulous Flavours from the East. Mitchell Beazley. 2016. ISBN 9781784720476.
- Feasts. 2017. ISBN 9781784722135.
- Bazaar. 2019. ISBN 9781784725174.
- Simply. 2020. ISBN 9781784727031.
- Persiana Everyday. Aster. 2022.
- Flavour. 2023. ISBN 9781783255108.
