= Georgina Hayden =

British chef, food writer and stylist (born 1982)

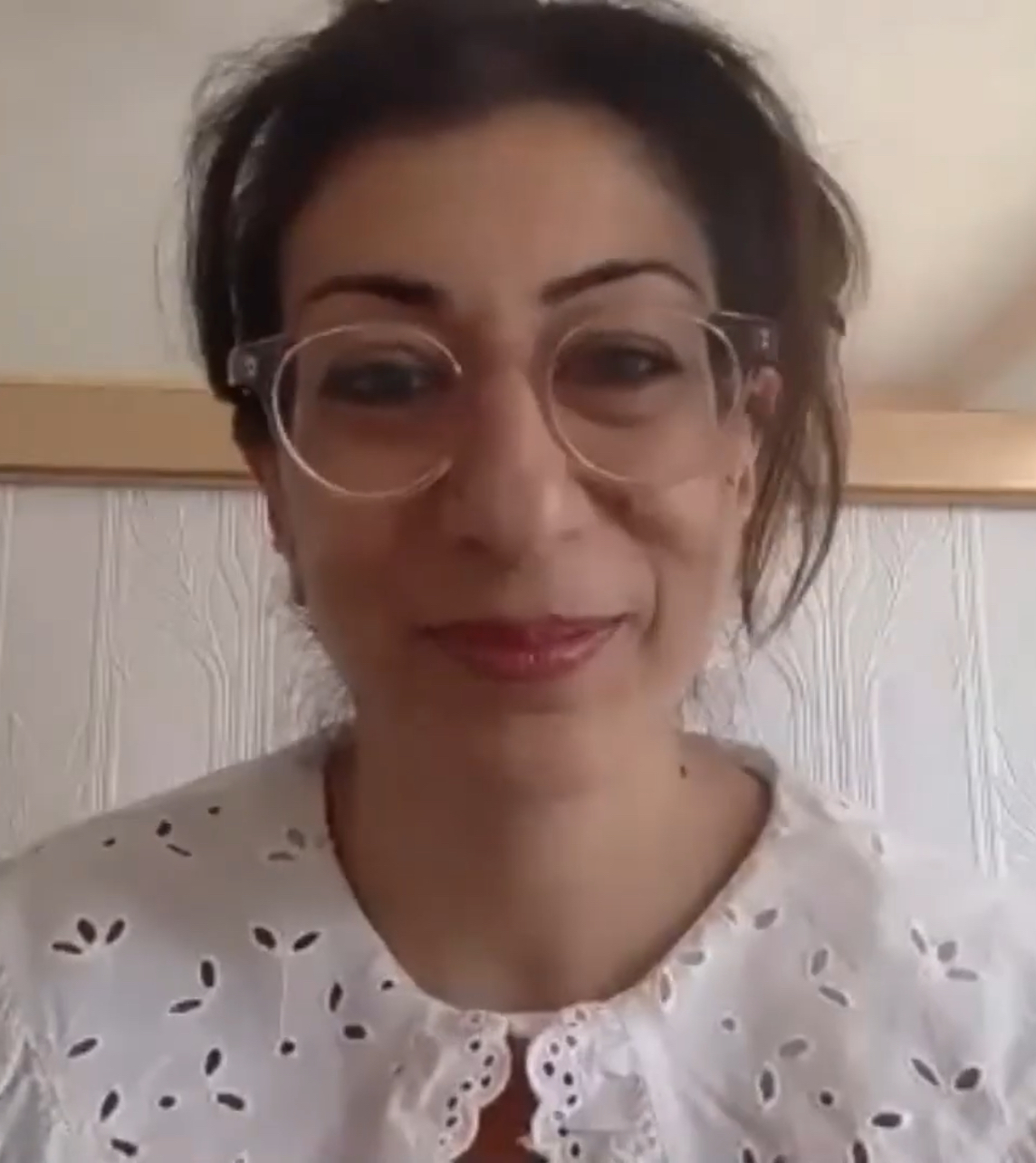
- Hayden in 2021
- Born: 1982 (age 43–44); Tufnell Park, London, England
- Education: University of Leeds
- Website: georginahayden.com

Georgina Hayden (born 1982) is an English chef, food writer and stylist, and television personality. She has authored five cookbooks and received a number of accolades, including a Fortnum & Mason Food and Drink Award. On television, she appears in the programmes Saturday Kitchen on BBC One and Sunday Brunch on Channel 4.

== Early life ==
Hayden was born and spent her early childhood in the flat above her Greek Cypriot paternal grandparents' taverna Dirlandas in Tufnell Park, North London before moving "down the road". Her maternal grandparents, also from Cyprus, ran a deli in Seven Sisters. Hayden studied Art History and Fine Art at the University of Leeds.

== Career ==
Hayden began her career as a food assistant and contributing to food magazines. She became inspired to pursue food styling and was scouted at a photoshoot to work for Jamie Oliver's team, which she did for 12 years. In the aftermath of her son's stillbirth, Hayden turned to cooking, creating meal plans to "ease" herself and her husband through their grief. This routine formed the basis of her debut cookbook Stirring Slowly: Recipes to restore & revive, which was published in June 2016 via Square Peg (a Penguin Books UK imprint). Oliver provided the book's foreword.

In January 2019, Hayden joined Delicious Magazine as a columnist. That same year, she reunited with Square Peg for the publication of her second cookbook Taverna: Recipes from a Cypriot Kitchen. In 2020, Hayden began making regular appearances on the BBC One programme Saturday Kitchen as well as the Channel 4 programme Sunday Brunch. For her contributions to Delicious and Waitrose's in-house pFood Magazine, Hayden won the Recipe Writing Award at the 2020 Guild of Food Writers (GFW) Awards and was named Cookery Writer of the Year at the 2021 Fortnum & Mason Food and Drink Awards respectively.

Via Bloomsbury Publishing, Hayden's third cookbook Nistisima: The secret to delicious vegan cooking from the Mediterranean and beyond was published in 2022. The title translates to Lenten, inspired by the plant-based dishes eaten amid fasting periods on the Eastern Orthodox calendar, though the cookbook is aimed at a general audience. Nistisima became a Sunday Times bestseller and won Best New Cook Book at the Observer Food Monthly (OFM) Awards. Also in 2022, Hayden was a judge on Oliver's Channel 4 competition The Great Cookbook Challenge.

Hayden's fourth cookbook Greekish: Everyday recipes with Greek roots followed in 2024, also via Bloomsbury Publishing. Greekish was shortlisted for a British Book Award in the Book of the Year: Non-Fiction Lifestyle and Illustrated category and named one of the top 10 food and drink books of 2024 by The Times.

Her next cookbook was MEDesque: Everyday Recipes with Mediterranean Roots in 2026.

== Personal life ==
Hayden lives in North London with her husband Pete and their two daughters. The couple also had a stillborn son in 2014.

== Bibliography ==
- Stirring Slowly: Recipes to restore & revive (2016)
- Taverna: Recipes from a Cypriot Kitchen (2019)
- Nistisima: The secret to delicious vegan cooking from the Mediterranean and beyond (2022)
- Greekish: Everyday recipes with Greek roots (2024)
- MEDesque: Everyday Recipes with Mediterranean Roots (2026)
