= Frank Bordoni =

British chef

Frank Andrew Bordoni (born c. 1965/1966) is a celebrity chef and member of the Guild of Food Writers. He has been members of the Craft Guild of Chefs, Vice President of World Masterchefs and an International Judge for numerous culinary competitions, awards and events.

Frank Bordoni was born in Windsor, Berkshire and had a formal, classical French training. In 1989 he was awarded a Roux Brothers Scholarship, and went to work for Albert Roux at Gavroche. He was a finalist in the Restaurant Association's Young Chef of The Year Competition in both 1989 and 1990. In 1991 he was a finalist for the senior, Chef of The Year Competition where he was narrowly beaten to the title by Gordon Ramsay.

At only 19 years of age, Bordoni was awarded his first AA Rosette. Now a prolific celebrity chef, Frank Bordoni has been a regular both as a Guest Chef and a Co Presenter on UKTV Food, as well as a guest Chef on the BBC Flagship cookery show Saturday Kitchen. He has also made appearances on GMTV and Taste on Sky1 and Sky3.

In 2006 he opened a restaurant in Amersham called Lemoncello. This venture did not last and closed less than two years later.

He is a judge for the Soil Association Organic Food Awards and the Great Taste Awards as well as the Free From Food Awards. He has had stints as a presenter, freelance chef, Food Editor and International Consultant.

A member of the Guild of Food Writers. Bordoni was Food Editor on 'Pure Magazine', was OK! Magazine's Resident Chef and as a freelance writer has contributes to many different publications. Frank has lectured at the London Film Festival and contributed to many books such as Hotel Chocolat, Cooking the Costco Way, the Saturday Kitchen Cookbook and The Charitable Cookbook. In September 2009, Bordoni's first book Mamma Mia!, a collection of his traditional recipes, was published by Fall River Press.
