= Easy Chinese San Francisco by Ching He Huang =

- Starring: Ching He Huang
- Country of origin: United States
- No. of episodes: 13

Production
- Executive producers: Tony Tackaberry, Allison Corn
- Running time: 30 minutes

Original release
- Network: Cooking Channel

Easy Chinese:San Francisco is a Cooking Channel show hosted by Ching He Huang. Ching explores all that San Francisco and the Bay Area have to offer by visiting local markets, farms and suppliers.
