= Wales on the Menu =

BBC Radio Wales series

Wales on the Menu is a BBC Radio Wales series where restaurateur, writer and food critic Simon Wright challenges home cooks of Wales to get their dishes on the menu of top restaurants across the UK. They must survive the criticism of leading chefs before a panel of diners decides whether they have succeeded in putting Wales on the Menu.

Wright's other work includes The Wright Taste on BBC Wales. He is a restaurateur at the award winning Y Polyn Restaurant.

== Episodes ==
1. (21 March 2010) Cowbridge student Tom Watts-Jones is the home cook attempting to impress award-winning chef Bryn Williams with his wild Welsh rabbit recipe.
