= Exploring China: A Culinary Adventure =

- Genre: Documentary
- Directed by: Emma Peach
- Presented by: Ching He Huang; Ken Hom
- Country of origin: United Kingdom
- Original language: English
- No. of seasons: 1
- No. of episodes: 4

Production
- Executive producer: Paula Trafford
- Producer: Emma Peach
- Running time: 60 minutes
- Production company: KEO Films

Original release
- Network: BBC Two
- Release: 5 August – 26 August 2012

Exploring China: A Culinary Adventure is a four-part British documentary television series that aired on BBC Two.

Chefs Ken Hom and Ching He Huang, both Chinese food specialists, describe their travels through China and the recipes and personal stories they found there. Hom and Huang traveled to Beijing, learning about Peking duck, and on to the Silk Road, Kashgar, and Sichuan Province, together bringing a unique and authoritative perspective on Chinese food. Ken and Ching undertook a 3000-mile culinary adventure across China – not only to reveal its food, but its people, history, culture and soul. BBC Books acquired and published the title to accompany the BBC Two series of four hour-long episodes.

In a review for The Guardian, Sam Wollaston lamented the series' low viewership during the 2012 Summer Olympics. He compared the show's treatment of self-discovery by the hosts favourably to an earlier show covering a similar subject by Gok Wan. The series' emotional resonance was praised in a review in The West Australian. Multiple reviewers were impressed with the presentation of noodle making in Exploring China.
