= Sophie Wright (chef) =

Sophie Wright is an English chef and the author of two cookery books.

During her training at Westminster Kingsway College she took part in national and international culinary competitions and is still a competitor. She left as both the highest achieving female chef and highest competition chef of the year.

Wright has appeared on Great Food Live, ITV Daily Cooks and Food Poker on BBC2.

She runs Sophie Wright Catering.

Her first book, Easy Peasy, won the Gourmand easy cookbook of the year award in 2008. Her second, Home at 7, Dinner at 8, was released in March 2011.

Wright has also been voted one of Red Magazine's top 20 women under 30 “Culinary Queen" 2011.
