= James Martin's Saturday Morning =

Television cookery programme

- Genre: Cookery
- Presented by: James Martin
- Country of origin: United Kingdom
- Original language: English

Production
- Running time: 150 minutes
- Production company: Blue Marlin Television

Original release
- Network: ITV
- Release: 2 September 2017 – present

Related
- Saturday Kitchen

James Martin's Saturday Morning is a British cooking show that has aired on ITV since 2 September 2017 as is presented by James Martin. Some of the chefs to join James Martin run two- and three-Michelin star restaurants, including: Sat Bains, Tom Kerridge, and Clare Smyth. Also among the chefs to join Martin are chefs from his time on Ready Steady Cook. Among them: Nick Nairn, Paul Rankin, Tony Tobin and Brian Turner.
