= James Martin (chef) =

English chef and television presenter (born 1972)

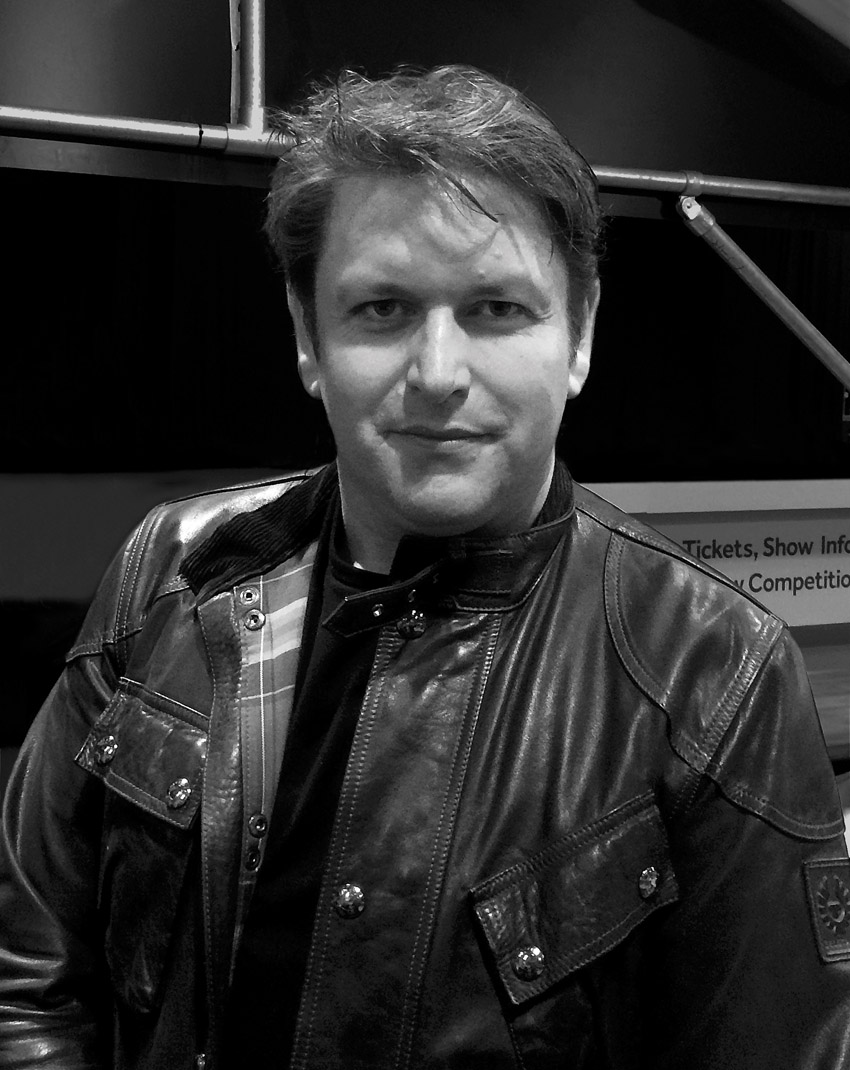
- Martin at the Good Food Show winter 2014
- Born: 30 June 1972 (age 54); Malton, North Riding of Yorkshire, England
- Years active: 1996–present
- Employers: BBC (2006–2016); ITV (2017–present)
- Television: Saturday Kitchen (2006–2016); Operation Hospital Food (2011–2014); Junior Bake Off (2013); James Martin: Home Comforts (2014–2016); This Morning (2016–present); James Martin's French Adventure (2017); Saturday Morning with James Martin (2017–present); James Martin's American Adventure (2018)
- Website: Official website

James Martin (born 30 June 1972) is a British chef and television presenter, best known for his television work with the cookery series Saturday Kitchen from 2006 until 2016, before leaving the BBC.

More recently, Martin has presented James Martin's French Adventure (2017), James Martin's Saturday Morning (2017–present) and James Martin's American Adventure (2018) for ITV.

== Early life ==
Martin's family were farmers on the Castle Howard estate in North Yorkshire, where he helped his mother in the kitchen, igniting his interest in cuisine. He lived in Welburn, attending Amotherby School in Malton and later on, Malton School.

== Career ==
=== Early career ===
James Martin trained at Hostellerie De Plaisance, Saint-Émilion, France, He then moved to the 3 Michelin Star restaurant Maison Troisgros in Roanne, France, after which he returned to the UK and spent two years as a Pastry Chef at Chewton Glen Hotel in the South of England.

=== Television ===
Martin first appeared on television in 1996, on programmes including James Martin: Yorkshire's Finest (set in various Yorkshire locations with an emphasis on Yorkshire cuisine), Ready Steady Cook and The Big Breakfast.

Martin co-presented BBC Food's Stately Suppers with Alistair Appleton, and then appeared on the Channel 4 programme Richard & Judy, where he would visit a member of the public in their own home who had been nominated to be cooked a 'comfort food' meal. From 2006 until 2016, he was the presenter of the BBC One show Saturday Kitchen.

In September 2011, Martin was tasked with revamping the menu and catering facilities at Scarborough General Hospital, for Operation Hospital Food for the BBC. The show was recommissioned for a second and third series, which were shown on BBC One in 2013 and 2014 respectively.

In June 2013, The Roux Scholarship was shown on Watch. Martin joined the judging panel, along with fellow celebrity chefs including Rick Stein, Raymond Blanc and Angela Hartnett.

In July 2013, Martin appeared alongside Angela Hartnett and Richard Corrigan on BBC One on a special edition of The Great British Menu entitled The Great British Budget Menu. The show aimed to highlight food poverty and involved the chefs cooking nutritious meals on a budget.

In September 2013, the programme James Martin's Food Map of Britain aired on BBC Two. There were 10 episodes with each focusing on a different region of Britain. Martin investigated the produce of each area and cooked two dishes per episode. Since 2013, he has been a judge on Junior Bake Off on the CBBC channel.

In October 2014, Martin presented a new daytime show for BBC One called Meet the Street, which aimed to unite communities and reduce loneliness. In 2015, he guest presented numerous episodes of The One Show with Alex Jones. The same year, Martin presented The Box, a daytime cookery series for BBC One.

In 2015, while attending the BBC Good Food Middle East Awards in Dubai, Martin witnessed the death of magazine boss Dominic De Sousa, whom he had been speaking with just moments before the tabloid mogul stood up and suffered a fatal heart attack. This event had an effect on Martin and had a part in him later deciding to leave Saturday Kitchen.

In February and March 2016 Martin toured his first live show around the UK entitled Plates, Mates and Automobiles.

Since September 2017, Martin has presented Saturday Morning with James Martin, a cookery show for ITV.

=== Journalism ===
Until 2013, Martin wrote a motoring column for UK newspaper The Mail on Sunday.

In September 2009, Martin wrote in his column that he hated cyclists, and took pleasure in scaring them by driving an electric Tesla Roadster (2008) in a manner that startled a cycling group, forcing them off the road. Following criticism from cycling groups and professionals such as Bradley Wiggins and Stuart O'Grady, he apologised for the article. Complaints said that the driving was illegal and dangerous. Martin said he did not condone "any form of reckless driving", stating: "It was never my intention to offend the many cyclists who share our roads across the country. What was intended to be a humorous piece was clearly misjudged."

=== Restaurants ===
Martin opened his restaurant, The Leeds Kitchen, inside the Alea Casino in Leeds in 2011. The casino, and with it the restaurant, closed in March 2013.

In 2012, he opened a restaurant inside the Talbot Hotel, Malton, North Yorkshire. The restaurant won a Michelin star at the end of 2012. In June 2013 it was reviewed by food critic Jay Rayner for The Observer, who described his meal there as "three beautifully poised, close to faultless dishes". Martin left The Talbot in February 2015.

In September 2013, Martin opened his restaurant James Martin Manchester, specialising in modern British cuisine; which closed permanently in October 2026.

There are branches of James Martin Kitchen Bakery & Cafe located airside at Stansted and Glasgow airports, and at Manchester Piccadilly Railway Station.

=== Cookery School ===
Martin teaches at The Kitchen – Cookery School at Chewton Glen, a cookery school and relaxed dining restaurant in New Milton, Hampshire.

=== Wine ===
In September 2021, Martin launched a range of premium French wines, which are produced in the village of Névian, near Narbonne in the Corbières region.

== Allegations of bullying ==
There have been numerous reports of bullying behaviour by Martin towards members of production team staff. In 2018 he was reported to have had a temper tantrum after a drain became blocked whilst filming a cooking show at his home. In July 2023, further reports surfaced of bullying towards production colleagues, resulting in several being reduced to tears by his behaviour. Martin stated "lessons have been learned". On 28 July 2023, Martin released a statement saying that he had been suffering from facial cancer at the time of the 2018 incident and has needed regular surgery.

== Personal life ==
In 2009, Martin gained a private pilot licence, and later qualified as a helicopter pilot.

Martin was previously in a longterm relationship with TV producer Louise Davies. Martin met Davies on Celebrity Who Wants to Be a Millionaire? Martin and Louise Davies separated in December 2023

Martin has been in a relationship with personal trainer Kim Johnson since 2024.

== Awards and honours ==
In 2010, Martin was awarded the title of Honorary Professor by the University of West London, London School of Hospitality and Tourism, along with Michel Roux, Raymond Blanc and Anton Mosimann.

On 10 June 2013, Martin was honoured with The Craft Guild of Chefs Special Award. In 2015, he was named TV Personality of the Year at the Fortnum & Mason Awards. Martin was inducted into the Guilde Internationale des Fromagers at the International Cheese Awards 2016.

In 2021, Martin was again voted TV Personality of the Year at the Fortnum & Mason Awards. On 6 September 2021, Martin's Saturday Morning scooped Best Food Show at the TV Choice Awards. In November 2021, Martin won the Most Influential Chef, Cook or Food Writer award, and also Best Cookbook, for Great British Adventure: A celebration of Great British food at the Great British Food Awards.

== Filmography ==
Television

Year	Title	Role	Notes	Channel
2005	Strictly Come Dancing	Contestant	Finished fourth place	BBC One
2006–2016	Saturday Kitchen	Presenter		BBC One
2007	Sweet Baby James	Presenter	1 series	BBC Two
2007	Blue Peter: Can You Cook It?	Judge		CBBC
2007	The Great British Village Show	Presenter	1 series	BBC One
2007	James Martin's Christmas Feasts	Presenter	1 series	UKTV Food
2008	Eating with the Enemy	Presenter	1 series	BBC Two
2011–2014	Operation Hospital Food	Presenter	3 series	BBC One
2012	Racing Legends: Jackie Stewart	Presenter	One-off episode	BBC Two
2013	United Cakes of America	Presenter		Good Food
2013	The Roux Scholarship	Judge		Watch
2013	The Great British Budget Menu	Presenter	One-off episode	BBC One
2013	James Martin's Food Map of Britain	Presenter	1 series	BBC Two
2013	Junior Bake Off	Judge	1 series	CBBC
2014–2016	James Martin: Home Comforts	Presenter	4 series (inc. Christmas series)	BBC Two
2014	Operation Meet the Street	Presenter	1 series	BBC One
2015	The One Show	Guest presenter	3 episodes	BBC One
2015	The Box	Presenter	1 series	BBC One
2016	This Morning	Guest presenter		ITV
2016	James Martin's Christmas with Friends	Presenter	2 episodes	Food Network
2017	James Martin's French Adventure	Presenter	1 series	ITV
2017–	James Martin's Saturday Morning	Presenter	1 series	ITV
2018	Walks with My Dog	Co-presenter	1 episode	More4
2018	James Martin's American Adventure	Presenter	1 series	ITV
2019	James Martin's Great British Adventure	Presenter	1 series	ITV
2019	James Martin's Sunday Selection	Presenter	1 series	ITV
2020	James Martin's Islands To Highlands	Presenter	1 series	ITV
2020	James Martin's Christmas Day	Presenter	Christmas special	ITV
2023	James Martin's Spanish Adventure	Presenter	1 series	ITV
2025	James Martin's Midweek Menu	Presenter	1 series	ITV
2027	James Martin’s Italian Adventure	Presenter	Upcoming series	ITV
2027	James Martin Quick ‘N’ Easy	Presenter	Upcoming series	ITV

== Books ==
- The Deli Cookbook ISBN 978-1840002119
- James Martin's Delicious!: The Deli Cookbook ISBN 978-1840006261
- Easy British Food ISBN 978-1840009774
- James Martin Desserts ISBN 978-1844004638
- James Martin's Great British Winter Cookbook ISBN 978-1845330408
- Eating In With James Martin ISBN 978-0753715802
- The Great British Village Show Cookbook ISBN 978-1405333177
- The Saturday Kitchen Cookbook ISBN 978-1846072239
- James Martin – The Collection ISBN 978-1845334604
- James Martin's Great British Dinners ISBN 978-0753715819
- Driven: Cooking in the Fast Lane – My Story ISBN 978-0007294671
- James Martin – Desserts ISBN 978-1844004638
- My Kitchen ISBN 978-0007294718
- Masterclass: Make Your Home Cooking Easier ISBN 978-0007294725
- James Martin Easy Everyday: The Essential Collection ISBN 978-1845336677
- Slow Cooking: Mouthwatering Recipes with Minimum Effort ISBN 978-1849491235
- Fast Cooking: Really Exciting Recipes in 20 Minutes ISBN 978-1849493185
- Home Comforts ISBN 978-1849494724
- Sweet ISBN 978-1849495578
- More Home Comforts ISBN 978-1849497916
- Slow Cooking ISBN 978-1787131019
- James Martin's French Adventure ISBN 978-1849499545
- James Martin's American Adventure ISBN 978-1787131538
- James Martin's Great British Adventure ISBN 978-1787133747
- James Martin's Islands To Highlands ISBN 978-1787135253
- James Martin's Complete Home Comforts ISBN 978-1787136519
- Butter ISBN 978-1787138223
- Potato ISBN 978-1787139657
- James Martin's Spanish Adventure ISBN 978-1837831296
- Cheese ISBN 978-1837831302
- James Martin’s Saturday Morning Cookbook ISBN 978-1837835157
- James Martin's Italian Adventure ISBN 978-1787136519
