= Olly Smith =

British wine expert and TV presenter (born 1974)

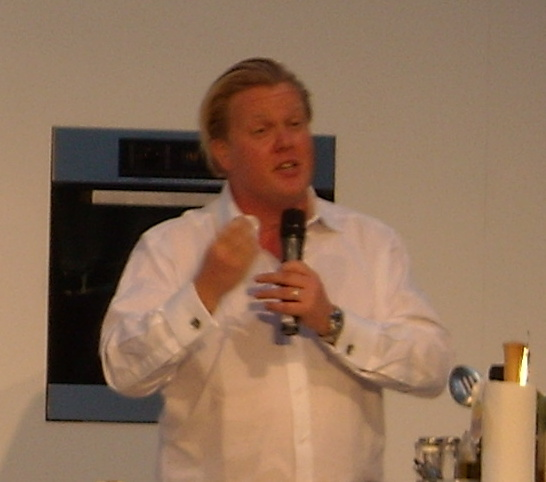
- Smith in 2009
- Born: 18 September 1974 (age 51); Darlington, County Durham, England
- Occupations: Television presenter, wine expert, author
- Spouse: Sophie Smith
- Children: 2
- Relatives: Will Smith (brother)

Olly Smith (born 18 September 1974) is a British wine expert and television presenter.

== Education and career ==
Having discovered a love for singing at eight years of age, he became a chorister at King's College, Cambridge, which saw him travel to sing in Japan, East Berlin and Finland. He earned a music scholarship to Charterhouse School, where he met his future wife Sophie Smith. He gained a master's degree in English Literature at the University of Edinburgh.

Smith worked in a wine shop as a cellar boy. He worked as a film and TV writer until he took part in Hardys-backed TV competition Wine Idol in 2005, and won. Part of his prize was an audition to appear on Great Food Live. Realising that there were opportunities for him to make a career in wine on television, Smith studied wine in his spare time. He eventually made it onto a Sky One series, Taste, and appeared on the Richard and Judy Wine Club, Saturday Kitchen, The Wheel, Mastermind and Tipping Point.

== Family background ==
The son of a nurse and a music teacher, Smith's older brother is the comedian and writer Will Smith. Smith was born in Darlington, County Durham, and grew up in Jersey. He lives in Sussex with his family.

== Writing ==
Smith has written five books, Eat & Drink: Good Food That's Great to Drink With in 2010, Wine: Both Barrels in 2012, Behind Enemy Wines in 2013, Drinking For Chaps in 2018, and Fizz in 2019. His sixth book, Home Cocktail Bible, was published in November 2021.

Smith previously wrote for film and TV including three series of Pingu, Wallace and Gromit and Charlie and Lola.

== Television ==
Smith regularly appears as a drinks expert on BBC1's Saturday Kitchen.

He presented two series of Ale Trails for the Travel Channel in 2016 and 2017 and in September 2014 presented a four-part series Last Taste of Summer, which aired on This Morning.

In 2011, he presented a ten-part series for Channel 4 entitled The Secret Supper Club.

In February 2022, Smith won an episode of Celebrity Mastermind; his specialist subject was the 1987 British black comedy film Withnail and I.

In June 2024, Smith was a contestant on an episode of Celebrity Bridge of Lies.

Smith has made guest appearances on podcast Grilled by The Staff Canteen.

== Awards ==
In 2011, Smith was named by Off Licence News among the top 75 most influential people in the UK wine trade.

- Best Drinks Writer – Great British Food Awards 2019, 2017 & 2016
- United Kingdom Vineyards Association Communicator of the Year 2012
- Roederer Awards Finalist for International Columnist of the Year 2012
- Wines of Portugal Journalism Award 2012
- International Wine & Spirits Communicator of the Year Award 2009
- Drinks Business Young Achiever of the Year Award 2009
