= Antony Worrall Thompson =

English restaurateur and chef

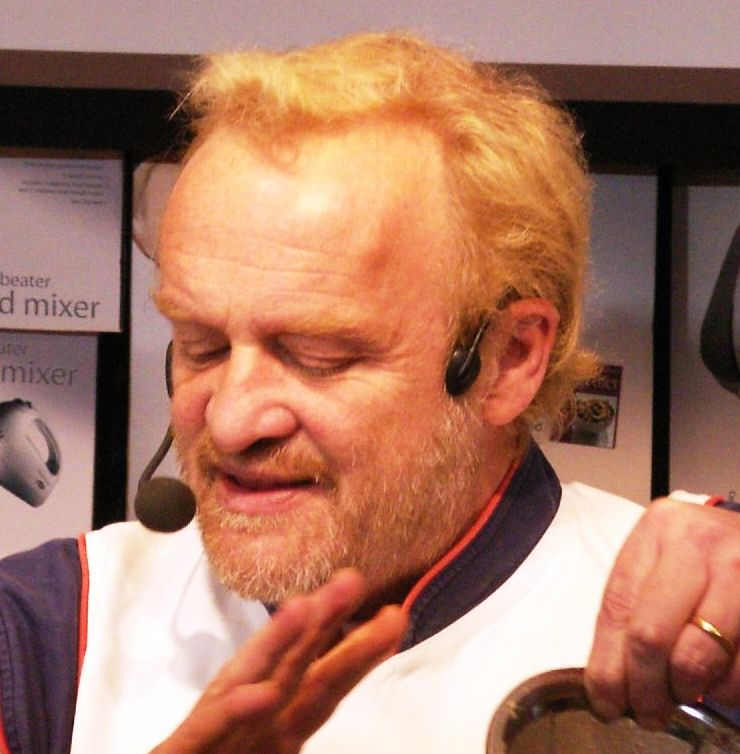
- Worrall Thompson in November 2006
- Born: Henry Anthony Cardew Worrall Thompson; 1 May 1951 (age 75); Stratford-upon-Avon, Warwickshire, England
- Other names: AWT; Wozza
- Education: King's School, Canterbury; Westminster Kingsway College
- Occupations: Celebrity chef; television presenter; radio broadcaster
- Years active: 1978–present
- Spouses: Jill Thompson (m. 1977; div. 1980); Militza Miller (m. 1983; div. 1994); Jacinta Shiel (m. 1996)
- Children: 5

Henry Antony Cardew Worrall Thompson (born 1 May 1951) is an English restaurateur and celebrity chef, television presenter and radio broadcaster.

== Early life ==
Worrall Thompson was born in Stratford-upon-Avon, Warwickshire. His parents, Michael Ingham (real name Peter Michael Worrall Thompson) and Joanna Duncan, were both actors. He was educated at the King's School, Canterbury, where he sustained facial injuries while playing rugby. He had to wait until he was twenty-one years old before he could have plastic surgery to correct the disfigurement. As a child he suffered from rickets.

== Early career ==
After he left school, he studied hotel management. In 1978, he moved to London and became sous-chef at Brinkley's Restaurant at Fulham Road, becoming head chef one year later.

== Restaurants ==
Prior to opening his first restaurant, Worrall Thompson was Executive Chef at 190 Queens Gate in South Kensington, London. He opened his first restaurant, Ménage à Trois, in Knightsbridge in 1981, notable for only serving starters and puddings. He then launched several successful restaurants, including Wiz and Woz in west London and Metro in Jersey. Until late 2006, he was Catering Director for Old Luxters Barn, in Buckinghamshire.

In February 2009, his restaurant holding company AWT Restaurants was placed into administration. Four restaurants closed – the Notting Grill in west London, the Barnes Grill in south-west London, together with two pubs in Henley-on-Thames, the Lamb Inn and the Greyhound. This caused the loss of 60 jobs. Worrall Thompson personally bought back the remaining Windsor Grill in Berkshire, the Kew Grill in south-west London, and a delicatessen, the Windsor Larder.

It was reported in April 2009 that Thompson's restaurant chain difficulties were the result of being "overstretched" and that his restaurants "had debts of more than £800,000 and owed 214 creditors money."

== Television ==
Worrall Thompson made his first television appearance on BBC2's Food and Drink, before appearing on Ready Steady Cook from 1994. In 2001, he appeared on Lily Savage's Blankety Blank, and in 2003, he appeared in the second series of I'm a Celebrity... Get Me Out of Here!, which led to him replacing Gregg Wallace as the host of BBC2's Saturday Kitchen. The show moved to BBC1 to replace Saturday morning children's television. He later presented the ITV series Saturday Cooks. The show was renamed Daily Cooks Challenge for the prime-time series which he also presented. He represented the Midlands and East of England in series one of the BBC's Great British Menu, but was defeated by Galton Blackiston. He was also on the mini series Trawlermen: Celebs at Sea, in 2019.

He was the first ever contestant to score a 100-point correct answer on Pointless during his appearance on Pointless Celebrities in 2013.

== Awards and honours ==
Worrall Thompson has won the Mouton Rothschild Menu Competition, and the Meilleur Ouvrier de Grande Bretagne (MOGB).

== Personal life ==
Worrall Thompson married Jill Thompson when he was 26; the couple divorced five years later. In 1983, he married an Australian, Militza Millar. The couple had two children and divorced. Since 1996, he has been married to his third wife, Jacinta Shiel. The couple live in High Wycombe and have two children. He is a patron of FOREST, a UK-based, tobacco industry-financed lobby opposing government regulation of tobacco and ASH. In February 2010, in a feature for Radio 4's Woman's Hour, he said that he had given up smoking.

He has been involved in fundraising for the Conservative Party and supported British withdrawal from the European Union.
