= Saturday Kitchen =

- Genre: Cookery
- Directed by: Geraldine Dowd; Toby Baker; John Adams
- Presented by: Current: Matt Tebbutt; Donal Skehan (stand-in); Former: Antony Worrall Thompson; James Martin; Gregg Wallace
- Starring: Helen McGinn; Olly Smith
- Country of origin: United Kingdom
- No. of episodes: 888, including various specials (up to and including 31 August 2024)

Production
- Executive producers: Julie Shaw; Amanda Ross
- Producer: James Bedwell
- Running time: 90 minutes
- Production companies: Cactus TV (2006–); Prospect Pictures (2002–06)

Original release
- Network: BBC One (2006–); BBC Two (2002–05)
- Release: 26 January 2002 – present

Related
- Celebration Kitchen; Go Veggie and Vegan with Matt Tebbutt; James Martin's Saturday Morning

Saturday Kitchen Live (formerly Saturday Kitchen) is a British food television programme typically broadcast on Saturday mornings between 10:00 and 11:30 on BBC One. It is also available on BBC iPlayer.

It is currently hosted by Matt Tebbutt and features wine and drinks experts Helen McGinn and Olly Smith, though there are sometimes guest hosts.

Each show includes a public figure such as a celebrity, broadcaster, author or sportsperson as a key guest. During the show, recipes are made live by a small number of profiled chefs. Each show also embeds archived clips from other cookery or food-related shows.

== History ==
=== 2002–2003 ===
After a pilot hosted by Ainsley Harriott on 14 April 2001, the show was launched on 26 January 2002. It was originally broadcast as a BBC production for the Open University under an educational remit and was hosted by Gregg Wallace. Each weekly episode also featured a celebrity chef in a pre-recorded format and archived content from Keith Floyd and Rick Stein was used to fill the show. The second series was broadcast live.

=== 2003–2006 ===
Following the success of the first two series, the programme was relaunched with celebrity-chef Antony Worrall Thompson as the host. The format included more aspirational food with an increased profile of professional and Michelin-starred chefs and celebrity guests. The BBC archive was retained for the revamped format, with Worrall Thompson and the guest chefs preparing dishes, with the clips used to allow clean-up and "resetting" of the studio kitchen.

During summer 2004, the programme temporarily moved to BBC One and aired as Saturday Brunch, live from Worrall Thompson's home. In January 2006, the show moved from BBC Two to BBC One, initially on a three-month trial basis. This drew controversy as children's programming was moved from its regular slot for the first time since the 1970s.

=== 2006–2016 ===
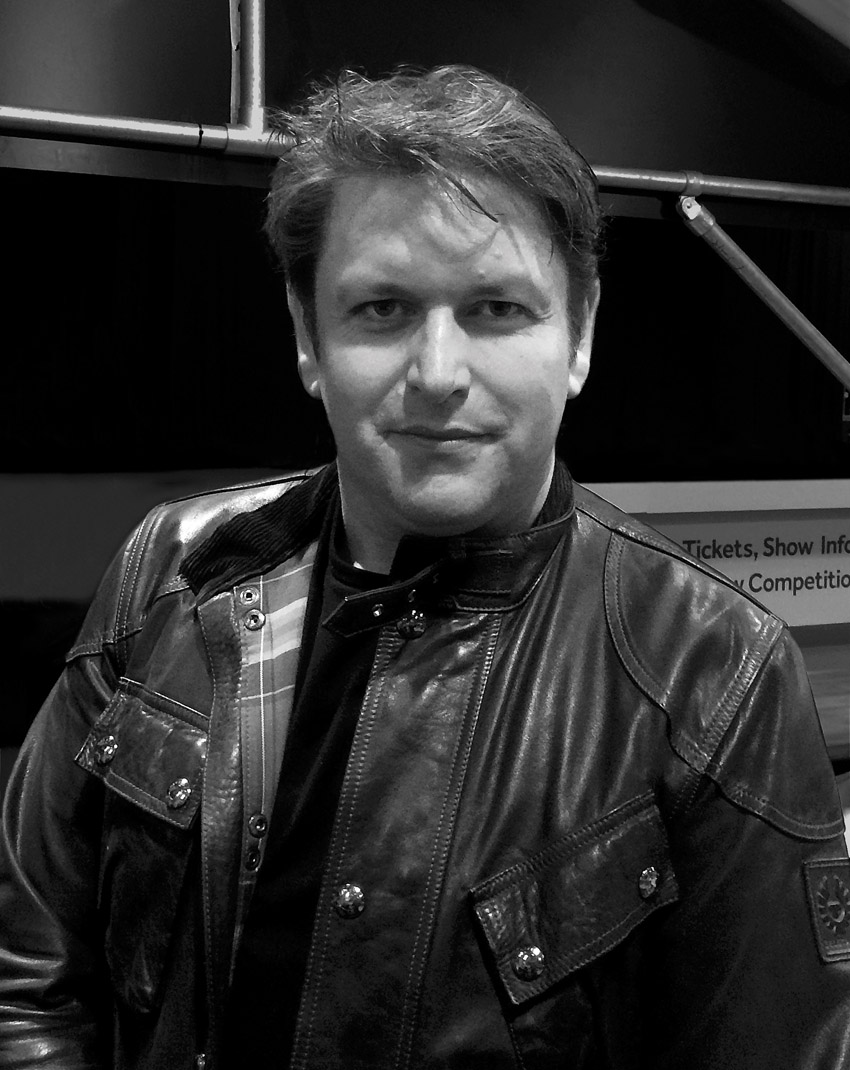
James Martin

After Worrall Thompson left the BBC to present Saturday Cooks! in June 2006, James Martin took over as host. During Martin's tenure, the audience increased from 1.2 million to around 2.5 million, peaking at 2.7 million on 9 January 2010.

On 8 September 2012, the first episode was broadcast from a new studio set, which saw a new design and the addition of mains gas and running water.

On 23 February 2016, Martin announced that he would be leaving the show to concentrate on other commitments, and "to have a lie in" on a Saturday. His last show was on 26 March 2016.

Among those to cover in Martin's absence were Matt Tebbutt and John Torode.

=== 2016-present ===
In April 2026, the BBC announced that the series' tender contract would be put up for competition.

== Presenters, experts, chefs, and guests ==
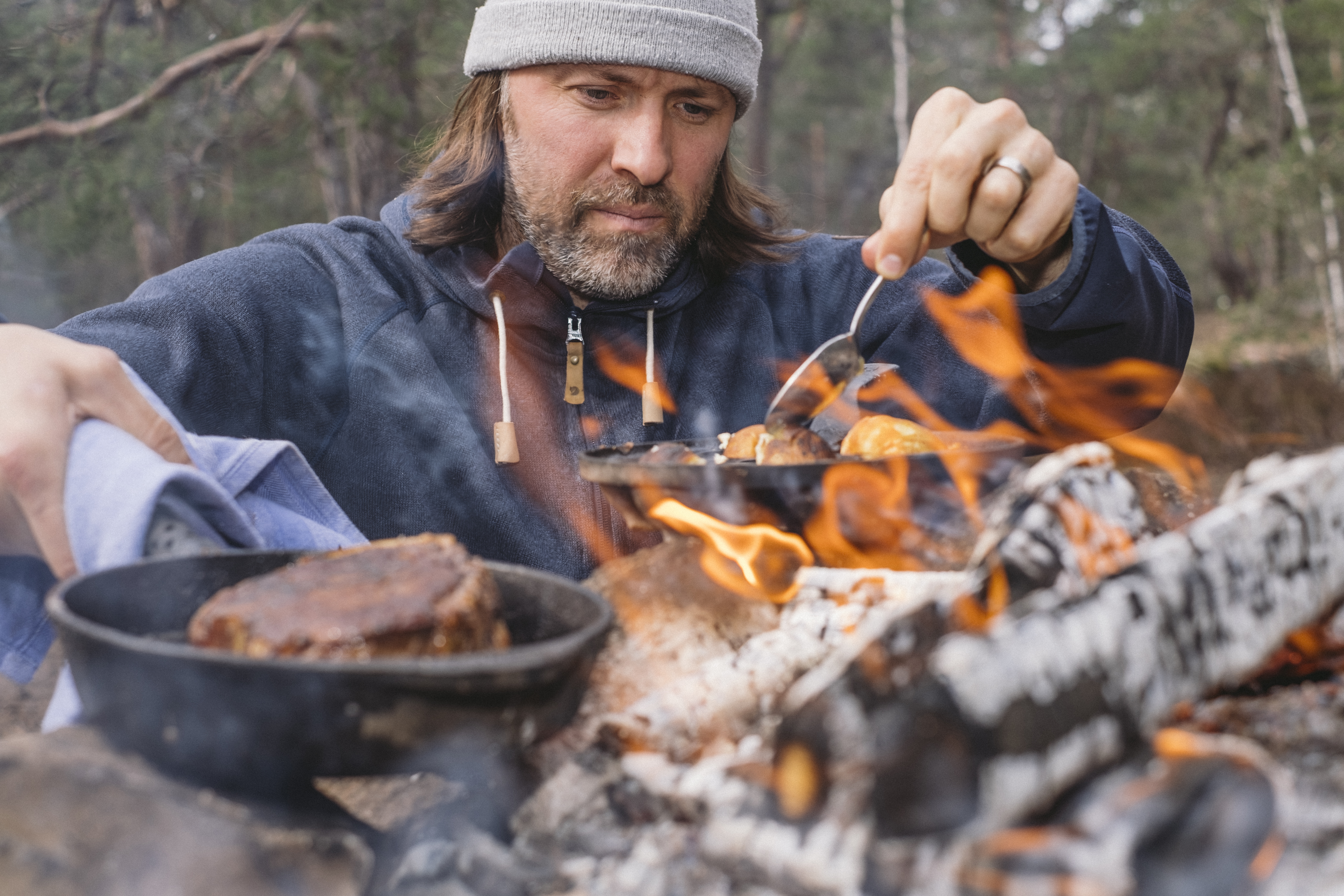

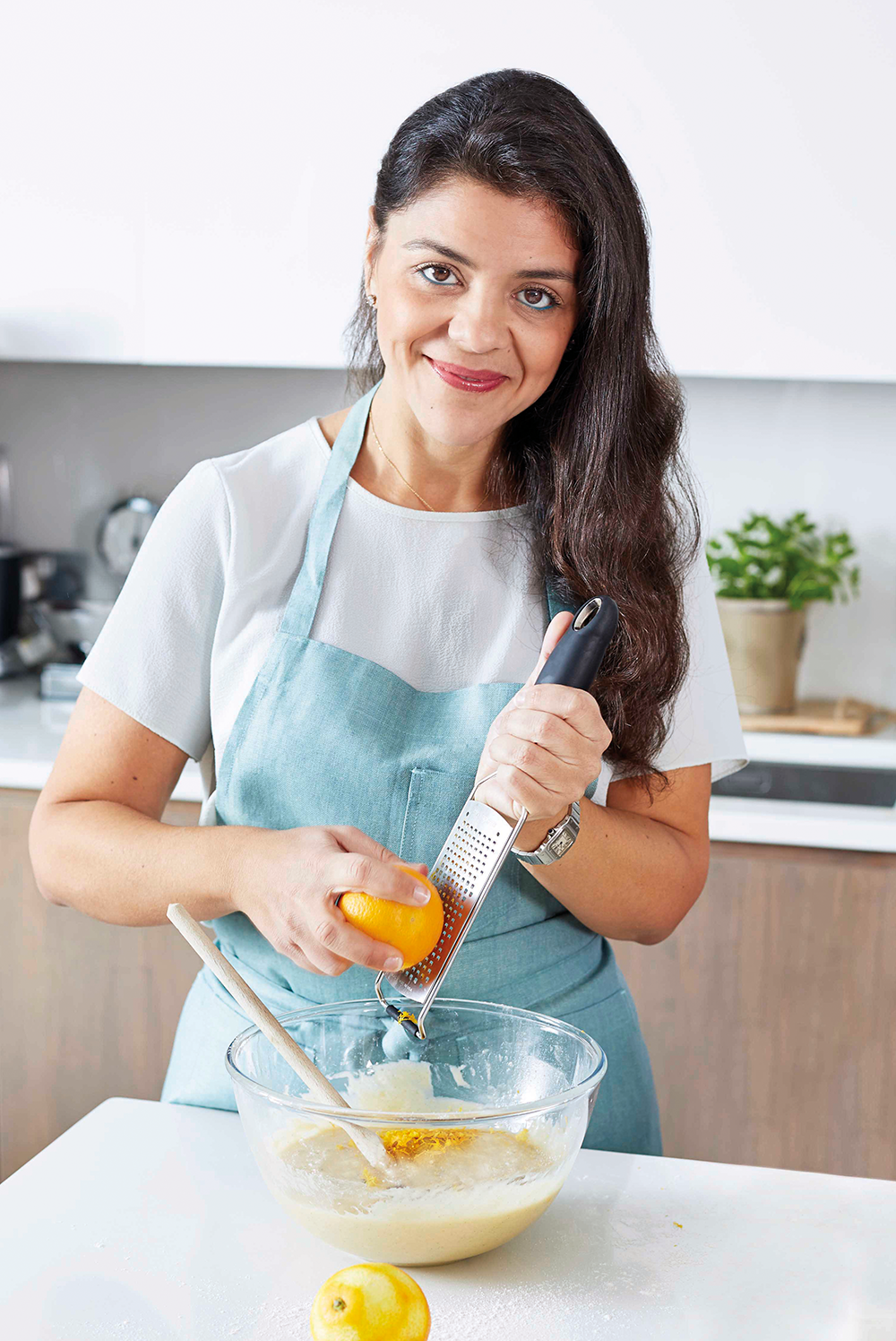
Niklas Ekstedt and Sabrina Ghayour

Matt Tebbutt is the predominant presenter, with Angela Hartnett and Anna Haugh among those to have deputised for Tebbutt.

=== Drinks experts ===
Each week, a drinks expert pairs various drinks to go with the studio dishes. Helen McGinn and Olly Smith are the predominantly featured experts.

=== Featured chefs ===
A number of restaurant and television chefs have featured on the show, including: Paul Ainsworth, Ravinder Bhogal, Niklas Ekstedt, Sabrina Ghayour, Ravneet Gill, Nathan Outlaw, and Georgina Hayden.

=== Celebrity guests ===
Various celebrity guests have featured on the show, including: Michael Ball, Gary Barlow, James Blunt, Stacey Dooley, Anton Du Beke, Lenny Henry, Beverley Knight, Nish Kumar, Oti Mabuse, and Sue Perkins.

== Features ==
Each show typically includes a host chef and two guest chefs, each cooking in the studio. They are joined by a celebrity guest, usually promoting a forthcoming or current project.

Each guest chef's dish is paired with a drink chosen by an expert.

In between each studio dish, excerpts are shown from the BBC Archives. The footage includes or has included Keith Floyd, Nigella Lawson, Mary Berry, The Hairy Bikers, Nigel Slater, Nadiya Hussain, Marcus Wareing and the Two Greedy Italians. A clip from a Rick Stein show, or the chef himself, has been shown in every edition aired.

Before the introduction of the 'Heaven and Hell' feature, the programme previously featured Worrall Thompson and guest chefs pitching a dish to be cooked, which the public voted on and a running total of wins were recorded by using fridge magnets.

=== Heaven or Hell ===
Each show concludes with the host and guest chefs cooking the celebrity guest a dish containing their favourite or least-favourite ingredient/s.

The choice of the 'Heaven or Hell' dish depends on a viewer-led online vote, or in the case of pre-recorded seasonal shows at Christmas for example, are left to a chance game.

== Saturday Kitchen Best Bites ==
In addition to the main episode shown on Saturday mornings which shows new content, there is a Sunday morning compilation episode called Saturday Kitchen Best Bites which features clips from previous episodes. This is also hosted by Matt Tebutt, but includes more extensive use of archive and compilation footage.

== Controversies ==
=== Competition with ITV ===
In June 2006, it was revealed that host Antony Worrall Thompson was to move to ITV to host a similar cooking show in the same time slot, Saturday Cooks!. The new show was to be made by the Saturday Kitchen producer, Prospect Pictures. In light of the changes, the programme was revamped with new host James Martin and new producer Cactus TV.

=== Misleading viewers ===
In February 2007, the programme was accused of misleading viewers to phone in to an apparently live segment, which was found to have been pre-recorded a week earlier.

=== Dietary requirements ===
In July 2016, Matt Tebbutt and food critic and writer Jay Rayner were discussing food requirements and preferences. During the show, Tebbutt said "I'd like people in restaurants to leave their dietary requirement at home. Unless, it's obviously life-threatening—that would be wrong! There are so many dietary requirements these days."

This led to some social media backlash around the distinction between dietary needs versus fussiness. One social media user stated: "For your information, dietary requirements aren't fussiness. Coeliac? Allergies? Ignorance makes dining out impossible for many." Another said: "I wish intolerant views were left at home, so disappointing."

Other tweets read: "I love, love Saturday Kitchen, but not everyone with a dietary requirement is trying to make life difficult for restaurants" and "thanks for making those of us with dietary requirements feel even worse about eating out."

Tebbutt responded: "Apologies, was being flippant. I mean the 'faddy' eaters amongst us, that's all."

=== Presenter selections ===
In January 2017, viewers took to social media to express their displeasure at Michel Roux, Jr's selection as host for an episode of Saturday Kitchen. A Guardian investigation published in November 2016, alleged that Roux had not paid some staff the minimum wage. The article also alleged that service charges added to bills had been used for restaurant revenues. Some viewers stated that they could not watch while Roux hosted.

Roux has guest-hosted several times since.

== Spin-offs ==
The programme has produced a number of spin-off series, including Celebration Kitchen, Spring Kitchen, Christmas Kitchen and Saturday Kitchen: Best Bites, a compilation programme currently airing on Sunday mornings on BBC Two, as well as the Saturday Kitchen Cookbook with James Martin, published by BBC Books in July 2007.

=== Celebration Kitchen ===
An identical format, with a specific focus on foods associated with respective religious festivals, such as: Eid al-Fitr, Passover, and Diwali.

=== Christmas Kitchen ===
Christmas Kitchen was a "show filled with guest chefs, celebrities, and treats from the BBC's festive food archives."

Series 1 (2013):
For each of the 10 shows, James Martin was joined by fellow chef Brian Turner. Joining them were a variety of chefs, including: Theo Randall, Vivek Singh, and Bryn Williams.

Series 2 (2014):
James Martin and Brian Turner returned for another series of Christmas Kitchen in December 2014. Over the course of the 10 episodes, they were joined by: Jason Atherton, Monica Galetti, and Nathan Outlaw, among other chefs.

Series 3 (2016):
At the presenting helm for the 10-part third series were Matt Tebbutt and Andi Oliver. This series featured appearances from Sabrina Ghayour and Olia Hercules. For each show, the team were also joined by former Bake Off contestants.

=== Spring Kitchen with Tom Kerridge ===
Spring Kitchen was a weekday, daytime spin-off of Saturday Kitchen presented by Tom Kerridge. The series aired for 14 episodes in April 2014.

For each show, Kerridge was joined by different chefs, including: Jason Atherton, Michael Caines, Daniel Clifford, Gennaro Contaldo, Lisa Goodwin-Allen, Angela Hartnett, Ching-He Huang, Tom Kitchin, Glynn Purnell, Theo Randall, and Bryn Williams.

Kerridge was also joined by a diverse cross-section of celebrity guests, including: Amanda Abbington, Chris Addison, Amanda Byram, Nicki Chapman, Jenny Eclair, Chris Hollins, Alex Jones, Jo Joyner, Nick Knowles, Dominic Littlewood, Craig Revel Horwood, Gaby Roslin, Danny Wallace, and Paul Young.
