= Jill Dupleix =

Australian food writer

Jill Dupleix (born 1961, Western District, Australia) is an Australian food writer, critic, and chef. She is currently the food editor at The Australian Financial Review Magazine and a director of the National Indigenous Culinary Institute in Australia. She was the cookery editor of The Times (London) from 2000 to 2006.

Dupleix spent eight years as a copywriter for advertising before beginning to write about food. She has lived in both London and Sydney, contributing to newspapers in both locations. She is also published, with cookbooks, including some co-authored with her husband, Terry Durack.

Her cookbook style leans toward simplicity - her titles include Simple Foods, Very Simple Foods, and Totally Simple Food. She also

She is quoted as saying "Nobody can teach you how to make the perfect cup of tea. It just happens over time. Wearing cashmere helps, of course."

According to her website, she now is the food curator for TEDxSydney.
