= Ken Hom =

Chinese-American television chef

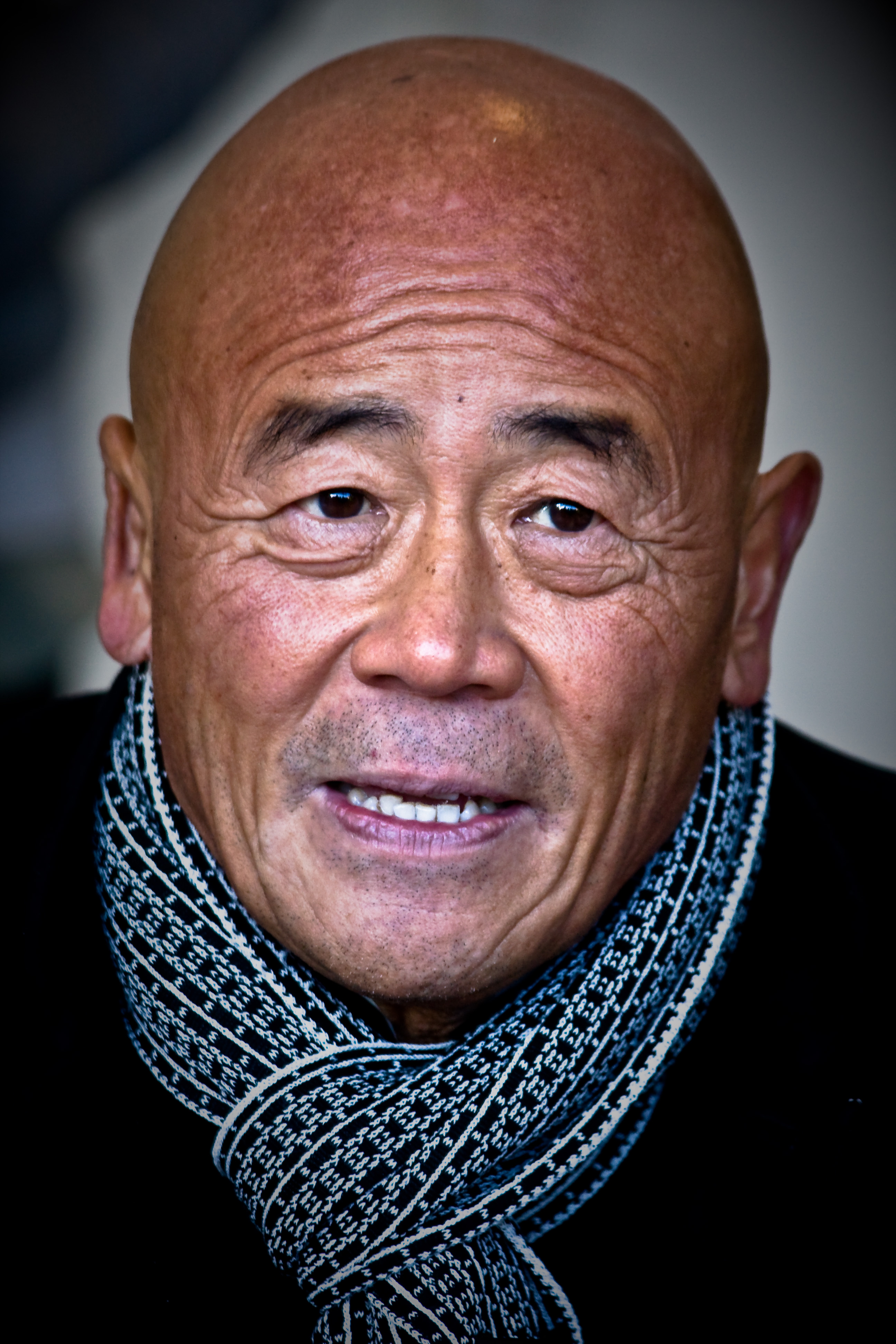
- Ken Hom's image
- Born: May 3, 1949 (age 77); Tucson, Arizona, US
- Education: University of California, Berkeley; University of Aix-en-Provence
- Culinary career
- Cooking style: Chinese, East Meets West, Asian: Thai
- Television shows
- Ken Hom’s Chinese Cookery (1984), Hot Chefs (1992), Ken Hom’s Hot Wok (1996), Ken Hom’s Travels with a Wok (1998), Foolproof Chinese Cookery (2000), Take on the Takeaway (2007), Noodle Road (KBS) (2008)

Ken Hom (traditional Chinese: 譚榮輝; simplified Chinese: 谭荣辉; pinyin: Tán Rónghuī, born May 3, 1949) is a Chinese-American chef, author and television-show presenter for the BBC, specialising in Asian and East/West Cuisine. Already appointed an honorary Officer of the Order of the British Empire (OBE) in 2009 for "services to culinary arts", he was further appointed an honorary Commander of the Order of the British Empire (CBE) in 2022.

== Early life ==
Hom was born in Tucson, Arizona, to parents from Kaiping. He was raised in Chicago, Illinois, by his widowed mother, Ying Fong, after his father died when Hom was eight months old. Hom first learned cooking at the age of eleven when he worked in his uncle's Chinese restaurant. He went to California to study History of Art at the University of California, Berkeley.

During this time he taught Italian cooking lessons at weekends to supplement his college fees. This led him on to teach Chinese cookery classes. In 1977 he was invited to join San Francisco's new California Culinary Academy as an instructor.

== TV career ==
In 1982, after a 2-year global search, the BBC auditioned him for a Chinese cookery series. The resulting TV series, Ken Hom's Chinese Cookery, had a companion book published by BBC Books.

He has since appeared in a number of prime time BBC TV series. His series for KBS called Noodle Road is a five-hour documentary on the history of the noodle. It sold in 23 countries and won the Peabody award in 2009. In 2012, he co-presented the BBC series Exploring China: A Culinary Adventure with Ching He Huang. He has made some of his many appearances on the BBC's long-running weekly show Saturday Kitchen with Huang. Since 2023, he has his own YouTube channel 'Ken Hom'.

== Charity ==
Since 2008, Hom has been an ambassador for Action Against Hunger, a humanitarian charity which works in over 40 countries helping families to feed their children and build a sustainable life. In 2010, he was diagnosed with prostate cancer and had proton radiation therapy in Japan. The cancer was successfully treated and he is now an ambassador for Prostate Cancer UK (formerly known as The Prostate Cancer Charity), building awareness for the early detection and treatment of cancers.

== Awards and honours ==
- Inducted in the Who's Who of Food and Beverage in America as recognition of significant and lasting achievement in the culinary industry, 1990
- Honorary Chairperson of The Institute for the Advancement of the Science & Art of Chinese Cuisine, 1993
- Honorary Member of the 48 Group Club, 2002
- Appointed Founding Patron of Oxford Gastronomica: the Centre for Food, Drink and Culture, 2007
- Honorary doctorate from Oxford Brookes University for outstanding success within the international food world, 2007
- Grand Prize Winner Documentary - ABU Awards, 2009
- Grand Prize Winner - Korea's Producer Award for "Noodle Road", 2009
- Appointed Founding Patron of the Oxford Cultural Collective, 2017
- Awarded Honorary Officer of the Order of the British Empire OBE by Queen Elizabeth II for services to the culinary arts, 2009
- "Noodle Road" nominated for best TV documentary of New York Film Festival, 2010
- Honorary Member of the Cherie Blair Foundation for Women, 2010
- Peabody Award for "Noodle Road" TV documentary series for KBS, 2010
- Food Broadcast of the Year Award 2013 for "Exploring China: A Culinary Adventure" with Ching He Huang Guild of Food Writers Awards
- Awarded Honorary Commander of the Order of the British Empire CBE by Queen Elizabeth II for services to charity, culinary arts and education, 2022

In Ken Hom's name:

- Annual Ken Hom Lecture series at Oxford Brookes University
- Ken Hom Writer in Residence Fellowship at Oxford Brookes University
- The Ken Hom Collection at the Oxford Brookes University

Book awards:

- Ken Hom’s East Meets West Cuisine (Macmillan, 1987) Shortlisted for Andre Simon Memorial Book of Year
- Easy Family Dishes: A Memoir with Recipes (BBC Books, 1998) Winner of the Andre Simon Memorial Book of Year
- The Taste of China (Pavilion Books, 1990) Shortlisted for Andre Simon Memorial Book of Year
- Ken Hom’s Quick Wok (Headline Books, 2001) Cookbook of the Year from Food and Wine magazine, USA
- Truffes with Pierre-Jean Pébeyre (Hachette, 2001) Shortlisted for Prix Litteraire de la Gastronomie Antonin Careme
- The Taste of Leicester (John Wagstaff Books, 1991) Shortlisted for the Big Dave Award
- Exploring China: A Culinary Adventure (with Ching He Huang) (2012) Gourmand International Awards 2013, Paris Cookbook Fair – ‘Best in the World’ award for the Culinary Travel Category. Short listed for The Guild of Food Writers Awards 2013 for both the Food Broadcast of the Year Award and the Award for Work on Food and Travel
- Truffles with Pierre-Jean Pébeyre (Serindia 2014) Winner Gourmand World Cookbook Award 2015 for Best Mushrooms (USA)
- The Best25 (25 years of cookbooks) The Gourmand Awards: Exploring China: A Culinary Adventure By Ken Hom & Ching He Huang 2021 in at Paris Cookbook Fair

== Business interests ==
Since 1986, Hom has had a base in Paris. In 1997, he settled permanently in south west France in a restored 13th-century tower in Lot. Hom has also spent more time in his adopted home of Thailand since 2003.

Hom is an author of more than 20 cookery books. Alongside his best known work on Chinese cuisine, his works also include topics on Cambodian, Malaysian, Thai, Singaporean, and Vietnamese cooking. He has worked as a consultant for hotels and restaurants and cooked personally for presidents, celebrities and royalty.

In 2009, Hom entered into an exclusive agreement with British supermarket chain Tesco to launch a 32-product range of Ken Hom branded Chinese ready meals.

Despite semi-retirement, he continues to travel extensively worldwide and divides his time between France and Bangkok.

== Television ==
- Ken Hom’s Chinese Cookery (1984)
- Hot Chefs (1992)
- Ken Hom’s Hot Wok (1996)
- Ken Hom’s Travels with a Hot Wok (1998)
- Foolproof Chinese Cookery (2000)
- Take on the Takeaway (2007)
- Noodle Road (KBS) (2008)
- Exploring China: A Culinary Adventure (with Ching He Huang) (2012)

== Books ==
- Hom, Ken (1981). Chinese Technique. Simon & Schuster. ISBN 0-671-25347-6.
- Hom, Ken (1987). Ken Hom's East Meets West Cuisine. Macmillan Publishers. ISBN 978-0-3334-5989-8.
- Hom, Ken (1988). Easy Family Dishes: A Memoir with Recipes. BBC Books. ISBN 978-0-5633-8439-7.
- Hom, Ken (1989). Fragrant Harbor Taste: the new Chinese cooking of Hong Kong. Simon & Schuster. ISBN 0-671-64469-6.
- Hom, Ken (1989). Ken Hom's Quick and Easy Chinese Cookery. BBC Books. ISBN 0-563-20675-6.
- Hom, Ken (1990). The Taste of China. Pavilion Books. ISBN 978-1-8514-5247-7.
- Hom, Ken (1997). Easy Family Recipes from a Chinese-American Childhood. Alfred a Knopf. ISBN 978-0-3945-8758-5.
- Hom, Ken (2001). Ken Hom's Quick Wok. Headline Publishing Group. ISBN 978-0-7553-1091-3.
- Hom, Ken (2001). Truffes. Hachette. 978-2-0123-6629-9.
- Hom, Ken (2002). Ken Hom's Travels With a Hot Wok. BBC Books. ISBN 978-0-5635-3494-5.
- Hom, Ken (2003). Foolproof Asian Cookery. BBC Books. ISBN 978-0-5634-8869-9.
- Hom, Ken (2004). Ken Hom's Top 100 Stir Fry Recipes. BBC Books. ISBN 978-0-5635-2164-8.
- Hom, Ken (2004). Wok & Co. Hachette. ISBN 978-1-8443-0177-5.
- Hom, Ken (2005). Simple Asian Cookery. BBC Books. ISBN 978-0-5634-9368-6.
- Hom, Ken (2006). Ken Hom's Simple Thai Cookery. BBC Books. ISBN 978-0-5634-9328-0.
- Hom, Ken (2011). My Kitchen Table - Ken Hom: 100 Quick Stir-Fry Recipes. BBC Books. ISBN 978-1-84990-147-5.
- Hom, Ken (2011). Complete Chinese Cookbook. BBC Books. ISBN 978-1-84990-082-9.
- Hom, Ken (2012). My Kitchen Table: 100 Easy Chinese Suppers. BBC Books. ISBN 978-1-8499-0398-1.
- Hom, Ken (2012). Exploring China: A Culinary Adventure. BBC Books. ISBN 978-1-8499-0498-8.
- Hom, Ken (2014). Truffles with Pierre-Jean Pébeyre. Serindia. ISBN 978-1-9324-7668-2.
- Hom, Ken (2016). My Stir-Fried Life with James Steen. The Robson Press. ISBN 978-1-8495-4978-3.

== General references ==
- Davies, H (2006-12-03). "Hom and away". The Times. Archived from the original on July 16, 2011.
- Frith Powell, H (2004-09-19). "French dressing". The Times. Archived from the original on July 16, 2011.
- "Chef biogs: Ken Hom". Food. BBC.
- Fletcher, S (2001-10-14). "Desert island dish". The Guardian.
- Clark, A (2001-04-14). "Wok coup". The Guardian.
- Crace, J (2000-11-26). "My inspiration". The Guardian.
- Millar, S (1999-03-16). "TV chef attacks Britain's mass-produced diet and urges conversion to 'nutritious' oriental food culture". The Guardian.
- McCurrach, I (2007-04-08). "Tasting places: Ken Hom on the countries he savours most". The Independent on Sunday.
- "Ken Hom To Be Awarded With Honorary Doctorate". Food and Drink. Easier. 2007-09-07.
- Sheldrick, G (2007-09-09). "Honorary survivor". Oxford Mail.
- "Past winners of the Andre Simon Memorial Fund Awards". Andre Simon Memorial Fund. Easier. 2007-09-07.
- Nacheva, V (2001-05-17). "Woking up funds for charities". Sofia News.
