= Monument to the Women of World War II =

War memorial in Whitehall, London

- United Kingdom
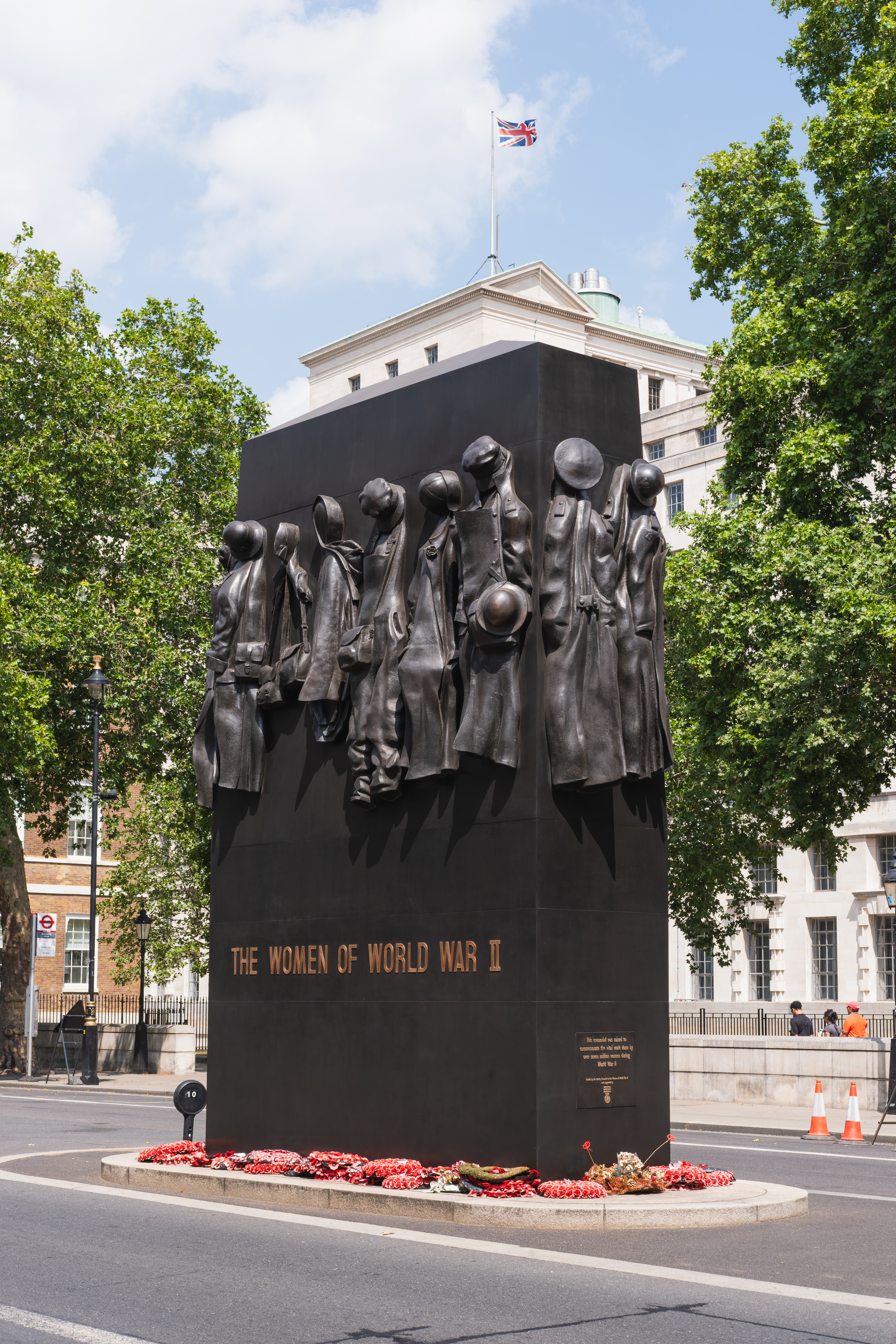
- Monument to the Women of World War II (looking west)
- For the women of the Second World War
- Unveiled: 9 July 2005; 21 years ago
- Location: 51.5035°N 0.1262°W

The Monument to the Women of World War II is a British national war memorial situated on Whitehall in London next to the Cenotaph at the end of Downing Street. The sculpture represents the wartime contributions of over seven million women, including 650,000 who joined military services. It is a 6.7-metre (22 ft) tall hollow bronze resembling a coat rack representing Winston Churchill's call 'Let the Women Come Forward', the idea being that women left their normal lives to fight for survival in any role necessary. The monument was sculpted by John W. Mills, himself a wartime evacuee when his mother joined the fire service.

The bronze was unveiled by Queen Elizabeth II in July 2005, the 60th anniversary of VE Day. The Queen was a teenage mechanic and driver in the Auxiliary Territorial Service, the women's army service. Fundraising was conducted by the Memorial to Women of WWII charitable trust, the patron of which was the Speaker of the House of Commons Baroness Boothroyd. Anne, Princess Royal was a vice-patron, as was wartime singer Dame Vera Lynn. The National Heritage Memorial Fund paid for most of the project. Boothroyd also raised money and public support on the game show Who Wants to Be a Millionaire?. Only two of the original charitable trustees are still living. Journalist Peri Langdale followed the campaign for eight years, making two programmes for ITV Tyne Tees about the project.

== Origins ==
The idea for a memorial was raised with retired Major David McNally Robertson in 1997, who was informed that, while many countries had a national monument to the work that women undertook during World War Two, the UK did not. Previous campaigns had only been limited to attempting to generate funds for a plaque in York Minster with Robertson, and former gunners Edna Storr and Mildred Veal leading the campaign. They founded a fundraising trust together with Bill Moralee and Peri Langdale, journalist and ITV documentary producer. Speaker of the House of Commons Betty Boothroyd, Dame Vera Lynn and the Princess Royal joining. Boothroyd became patron of the trust, with Dame Vera and the Princess Royal as vice–patrons. The remaining vice–patrons were John Grogan, MP for Selby; Hugh Bayley, the MP for City of York; Baroness Finlay of Llandaff and Robert Crawford.

Over £300,000 was raised by the public. The National Heritage Memorial Fund then gave £934,115 towards the cost of the bronze sculpture to celebrate its 25th anniversary, while £8,000 was raised by Baroness Boothroyd who chose the fund as when she appeared on the game show Who Wants to Be a Millionaire? in 2002. The remaining funds were raised by the Memorial to the Women of World War II Fund, a charitable fund based in York.

== Design ==
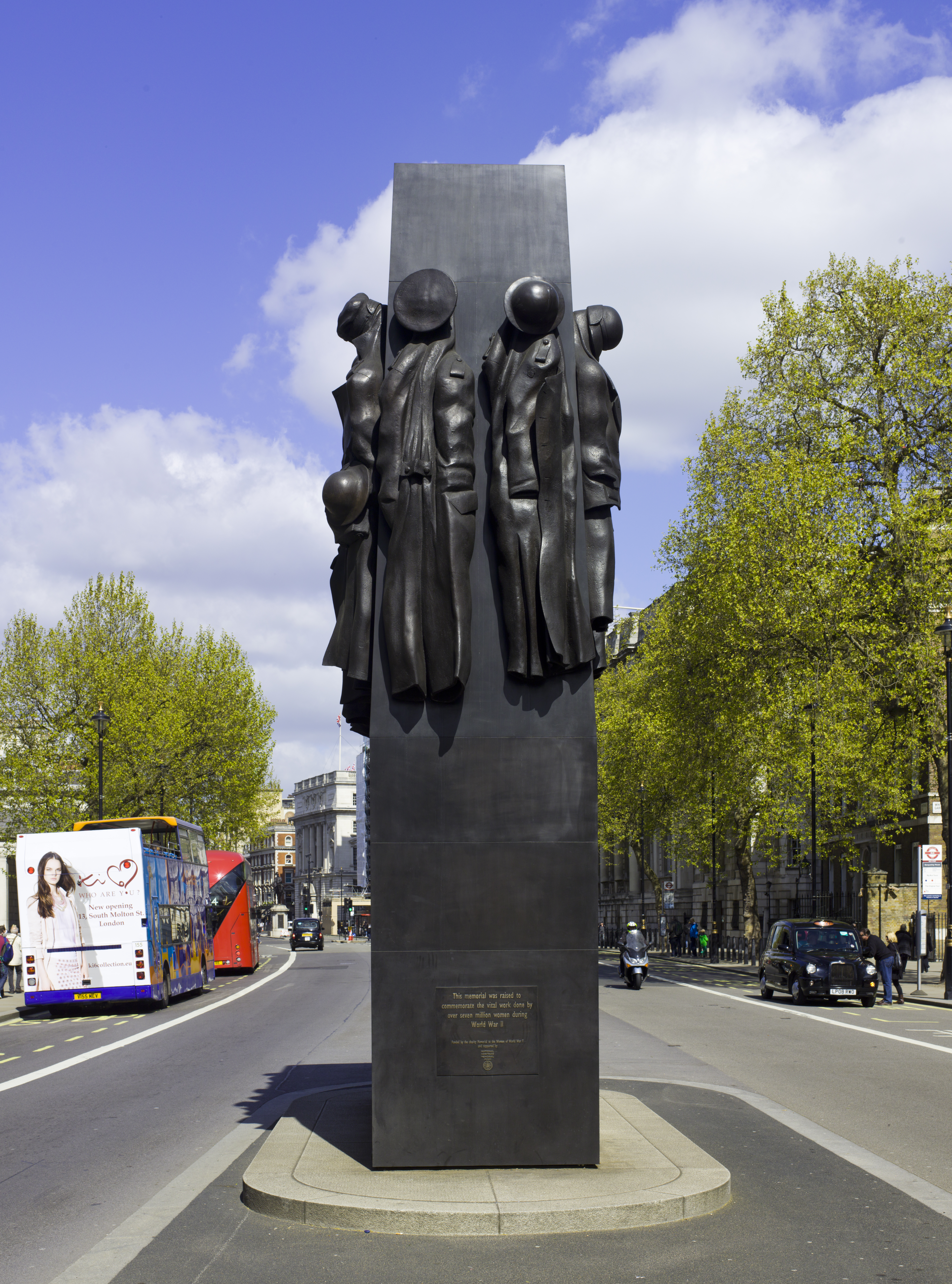
Monument to the Women of World War II (looking north)

The initial design involved a female Air Raid Warden sheltering children; however, this was simplified until the final design was created. The bronze monument stands 22 feet (6.7 m) tall, 16 feet (4.9 m) long and 6 feet (1.8 m) wide. The lettering on the sides replicates the typeface used on war time ration books. There are 17 individual sets of clothing and uniforms around the sides, symbolising the hundreds of different jobs women undertook in World War II and then gave back for the homecoming men at the end of the war. These outfits include uniforms as worn by the Women's Land Army, Women's Royal Naval Service, a nursing cape, a police overall and a welding mask.

== Unveiling ==
The memorial was unveiled on 9 July 2005, two days after the 7/7 London bombings, by Queen Elizabeth II as part of the 60th anniversary of the end of the Second World War. Also in attendance at the ceremony were Baroness Boothroyd, Baroness Thatcher, Dame Vera Lynn and the Defence Secretary John Reid, as well as a number of female war veterans. These veterans included Nancy Wake, the Allies' most decorated servicewoman. A flypast of five military helicopters took place, an Apache, Sea King, Lynx, Chinook and Merlin, which were flown by all-female crews. This was followed by a flypast of two Panavia Tornado ADVs, flown by female pilots.

Baroness Boothroyd dedicated the memorial saying: "This monument is dedicated to all the women who served our country and to the cause of freedom, in uniform and on the home front. I hope that future generations who pass this way will ask themselves: 'what sort of women were they?' and look at our history for the answer."

== Vandalism ==
In May 2015, after the Conservative Party won a majority in a general election, the memorial was vandalised with the words "Tory scum" in red graffiti. Downing Street called the damage "despicable", and at least 17 people were arrested following clashes in Whitehall. Comments on social media by Katie Hopkins, a rightwing columnist, that falsely implied food writer Jack Monroe backed the defacement of war memorials by protestors lead to the 2017 libel case Monroe v Hopkins, which Hopkins lost.

== See also ==
- Monroe v Hopkins, a libel case concerning the damage to the Monument.
- Women in World War II
