= Kate Quilton =

English television presenter (born 1983)

- Born: Katie Marie Quilton; 30 November 1983 (age 42); Nuneaton, Warwickshire, England
- Education: University of Bristol
- Occupations: Television presenter and journalist
- Years active: 2012–present
- Employer: Channel 4
- Television: Food Unwrapped; Superfoods: The Real Story; The Shopper's Guide to Saving Money; Tricks of the Restaurant Trade
- Spouse: James Lance (m. 2016-2026)

Katie Marie Quilton (born 30 November 1983) is an English television presenter and journalist. She is best known for presenting a number of Channel 4 television series, including Food Unwrapped since 2012.

== Early life ==
Quilton grew up in Bury St Edmunds, Suffolk, the youngest of four children. She attended Thurston Community College.

== Career ==
While at the University of Bristol, Quilton undertook a student equivalent of Morgan Spurlock's Super Size Me, where she ate kebabs for one week for breakfast, lunch and dinner. The stunt was picked-up by a national paper. Quilton began her career in television while a student, and worked for ITV and the BBC. She went on to work as a broadcast journalist in Somerset for the BBC, spending a lot of her time with farmers, and reporting mostly on food. At Bristol, Quilton was the editor of Epigram newspaper.

Quilton was one of Channel 4's commissioning editors, a position she held 2010–14. She operated the World Wide Web editorial for some of the channel's biggest shows. She manages factual multi-platform commissions including The Food Hospital and Foxes Live. She won the BAFTA for Digital Creativity and the Digital Emmy award in 2014.

She resigned as a commissioning editor in 2014 to focus full-time on Food Unwrapped. In 2014, Quilton appeared with Food Unwrapped co-presenter Jimmy Doherty in The World's Best Diet, a one-off show for Channel 4.

In 2015, she presented Superfoods: The Real Story, a four-part series for Channel 4. The show returned for a second series of six episodes in 2016. She presented The Shopper's Guide to Saving Money, with David Fishwick, for four episodes in 2015. Since January 2016, she has presented Tricks of the Restaurant Trade alongside Simon Rimmer. The programming returned for a second series in November 2016. For the third series, she was replaced by Sophie Morgan. In 2016, she co-presented Be Your Own Doctor on Channel 4, alongside Tamal Ray. She took part in a special edition of Christmas University Challenge in December 2016, as part of the University of Bristol alumni team.

2017 and in 2019, she presented Channel 4's Animal Rescue Live: Supervet Special series with Noel Fitzpatrick and Steve Jones.

== Personal life ==
In April 2016, Quilton ran the London Marathon for Papworth Hospital in memory of her father, Kevin Quilton.

She married James Lance in 2016. On the Food Unwrapped Christmas special in December 2017, she announced that she was expecting her first child. She gave birth to their son in May 2018. As presenter in the documentary Breastfeeding Uncovered, Quilton revealed she had been harassed while nursing in public.

== Filmography ==
Television

Year	Title	Role	Notes
2012—	Food Unwrapped	Co-presenter	9 series; with Jimmy Doherty and Matt Tebbutt
2014	The World's Best Diet	Co-presenter	One-off episode; with Jimmy Doherty
2015—	Superfoods: The Real Story	Presenter	3 series
2015	The Shopper's Guide to Saving Money	Co-presenter	1 series; with David Fishwick
2016	Tricks of the Restaurant Trade	Co-presenter	2 series; with Simon Rimmer
2016	Be Your Own Doctor	Co-presenter	One-off episode; with Tamal Ray
2016	Christmas University Challenge	Contestant	1 episode; part of University of Bristol team
2017	Animal Rescue Live: Supervet Special	Reporter	1 series; with Noel Fitzpatrick and Steve Jones
2018	How to Be Healthy	Co-presenter	1 series; with Tamal Ray
2018	The Great British Germ Hunt	Presenter, Channel 4	One-off documentary
2018	Breastfeeding Uncovered	Producer and reporter	Dispatches, Channel 4
2019	The Great Formula Milk Scandal	Reporter	Dispatches, Channel 4
2019	The Truth About Chlorinated Chicken	Reporter	Dispatches, Channel 4
2019	Animal Rescue Live: Supervet Special	Presenter	1 series; with Noel Fitzpatrick and Steve Jones
2020	How To Beat	Presenter	Series, Channel 4
2020	Cruising: From Boom to Bust	Presenter	One-off episode; Channel 4
2023	Food Prices: How High Will They Go?	Presenter	Tonight episode
2023	How Safe Is Your Turkey? Dispatches	Presenter	Dispatches episode
2026	Will My Summer Holiday Be Cancelled? Dispatches	Presenter	Dispatches episode
