= Matt Tebbutt =

English chef and television food presenter

- Education: Rougemont School; Oxford Brookes University
- Children: 2
- Culinary career
- Television shows
- Saturday Kitchen; Food Unwrapped; Drop Down Menu; Market Kitchen; Great British Food Revival; Christmas Kitchen; Save Money: Good Food; Go Veggie and Vegan with Matt Tebbutt; MasterChef: The Professionals

Matt Tebbutt is a British chef and television food presenter best known for presenting shows such as Channel 4's Food Unwrapped and Drop Down Menu, the BBC's Saturday Kitchen and the Good Food channel's Market Kitchen. He ran The Foxhunter in Nant-y-derry for many years with his wife, but gave it up to focus on his TV career.

== Early life ==
Tebbutt was born on 24 December 1973 and was educated at Rougemont School in Newport. He studied geography and anthropology at Oxford Brookes University.

== Training ==
Tebbutt gained a diploma at Leith's School of Food and Wine in London, before working for some of London's most prestigious restaurants, including with Marco Pierre White at the Oak Room and Criterion and with Alastair Little whom he cites as the greatest influence on his cuisine.

== Career ==
=== Television roles ===
Tebbutt often presented Saturday Kitchen on BBC One while the regular host, James Martin, was away. He returned to the show as a guest presenter and now regular host of the show following Martin's departure.

Tebbutt currently presents Food Unwrapped on Channel 4 with Kate Quilton and Jimmy Doherty. He also presented Market Kitchen with Tom Parker-Bowles and Matthew Fort and its successor, Market Kitchen: Big Adventure with Penny Smith. He has also appeared on the Great British Menu and Great British Food Revival. He also co-presented Channel 4's Drop Down Menu with Gizzi Erskine.

In December 2016, he co-presented Christmas Kitchen, a daytime series for BBC One. His co-host was Andi Oliver. He has also co-presented two series of Save Money: Good Food for ITV with Susanna Reid.

In April 2020, it was announced that Tebbutt would co-host Daily Kitchen Live on BBC One with Jack Monroe. The show was made by Cactus TV which also created Saturday Kitchen. The programme, made in response to issues stemming from the COVID-19 pandemic, offered tips and guidance to families struggling with limited resources for a two-week period commencing 14 April 2020.

In September 2025, it was revealed that Tebbutt would replace Gregg Wallace as a judge on the 18th series of MasterChef: The Professionals, following Wallace's sacking after a report upheld several misconduct allegations against him.

=== Restaurants ===
He owned and ran the Foxhunter restaurant in Nant-y-derry near Usk in South Wales for 15 years. The restaurant has won a number of awards including the AA It is now leased as a pub while Tebbutt concentrates on his TV career.

=== Books ===
Tebbutt published Cooks Country: Modern British Rural Cooking (ISBN 1845333713) in 2000, Weekend: Eating at Home in 2021 and Matt Tebbutt's Pub Food (ISBN 1837831246) in August 2024. He is also the author of Guilty Pleasures.

== Personal life ==
Tebbutt is married with two children, and lives in Llantilio Crossenny, Monmouthshire.

In January 2022, Tebbutt had an emergency appendicectomy.
