= Bristol Fish Project =

Community-based aquaponics project in Hartcliffe, Bristol, UK

- Type: Community Interest Company
- Industry: Conservation
- Founded: 2011; 15 years ago in Bristol, United Kingdom
- Founders: Rose Crichton and Alice Marie Archer
- Key people: Rose Crichton, Alice Marie Archer, Annelies Leeuw, James Saunders, Sam Rossiter
- Products: Community aquaponics
- Website: https://bristolfish.org/

The Bristol Fish Project is a community-based aquaponics project located in the Hartcliffe area of Bristol, UK. The project was trialled in 2012, as a polytunnel system at the Artspace Lifespace college in Knowle, Bristol.

The aim of the project is to research sustainable methods of cultivating vegetables and other foodstuffs. The project has attracted some media attention. In 2018, Bristol Fish Project was featured on an episode of Jamie & Jimmy's Friday Night Feast.

== History ==
The Bristol Fish Project was conceived in 2011, following a discussion between Bristol based scientists Rose Crichton and Alice Marie Archer. A plan was formulated to devise a method of growing crops using nutrients derived from fish waste. The project was piloted at Artspace Lifespace College, in 2012.

In 2015, the Bristol Fish Project was identified as a flagship project for the European Parliament's European Green Capital Award.

In 2017, the Bristol Fish Project was awarded a grant from the European Commission. This allowed the project to relocate to its current home of Unit 1, Vale Lane. The group decided to pursue research on Anguilla anguilla. Dutch conservationist Annelies Leeuw was recruited, to oversee this aspect of the project. The eels were used to help educate the local community, with a substantial number released back into the wild.
