= Jamie & Jimmy's Friday Night Feast =

British television programme

- Created by: Fresh One Productions
- Presented by: Jamie Oliver; Jimmy Doherty
- Country of origin: United Kingdom
- Original language: English
- No. of seasons: 7
- No. of episodes: 60 (+ 2 specials)

Production
- Running time: 60 minutes (inc. adverts)

Original release
- Network: Channel 4
- Release: 10 January 2014 – 29 January 2021

Jamie & Jimmy's Friday Night Feast is a UK food lifestyle programme which aired on Channel 4 in 2014. A second series began in January 2015, with further series and festive specials commissioned. The last series was shown in 2021.

== About ==
The programme is presented by Jamie Oliver and Jimmy Doherty.

The series is based in Jamie and Jimmy's Cafe which is based at the end of Southend Pier, the longest Pleasure Pier in the World. Jimmy and Jamie are helped in the Cafe by one of Jamie's old students, Kerry-Anne.

Each week a celebrity guest joins Jimmy & Jamie in the Cafe and helps to cook a recipe of their choosing.

It has been claimed the cafe is a set, however this is not true. The building was a real cafe before the last big Pier fire in 2005 that decimated the remaining Pier attractions. The Pier Train Railway Station, Jolly Fisherman Pub, Gift Shop, Fish 'n' Chip Shop, Historic Post Box, ornate RNLI Collection Box, Victorian Phone Box and Ice-Cream Shop were all destroyed but the cafe building did survive and re-opened in 2006. Since 2013 the cafe has only been used for approximately 2 weeks per year for the filming of this show. Visitors to the end of the Pier go to a Cultural Centre Shelter which Southend Borough Council installed in 2012. The cafe users are members of the public who have applied to be on the show in order to pose as diners during filming.

== Episode menu ==
Each episode contains a menu of recipes, which consists of the following:

=== A Recipe for the Weekend by Jamie ===
In each episode Jamie cooks a recipe for the Weekend. These are usually filmed and cooked outside the Cafe, sometimes in or around his portable Pub, 'The Cock In Cider'. In Series Two these recipes came from his 'Jamie's Comfort Food' Book.

=== A Celebrity Guest Recipe ===
Each episode sees a guest come to the cafe and help cook a recipe to their choosing, usually one which has played a significant part of their life. Jamie and his research team ensure the recipe matches the original dish as best as he can to that of the recipe the Guest is familiar with.

=== A Food Fight Mission ===
Each episode Jamie & Jimmy also campaign for a food or cause in a Food Fight. In Series One Jamie and Jimmy campaigned each week to bring back and give recognition to regional recipes which were now unknown or on the decline. From Series Two Jamie and Jimmy campaigned each week to highlight an issue with Food Waste.

=== A DIY Food Build by Jimmy ===
In each episode Jimmy builds a DIY piece of cooking equipment, showing the viewers how to do it at home. This segment is filmed on Jimmy's Farm in Essex. From series 4 this focused on wild foods.

== Episodes ==
=== Series 1 (2014) ===
Episode	Guest	Jamie's Recipe	Guest Recipe	Food Fight: Bring Back...	Jimmy's DIY Food Build	Airdate
1	Usain Bolt	Steak	Jerk Pork	Nottinghamshire's Colwick Cheese	Tandoor Oven	10 January 2014
2	Sienna Miller	Salt Baked Salmon	Duck Ragu	Lancashire's Tosset Cake	Hog Roaster	17 January 2014
3	Amanda Holden	Two-Way Chicken	Moussaka	Richmond's Maid's of Honour	Kebab Grill	24 January 2014
4	Kirsty Allsopp	Shellfish Seafood Feast	Pani Puri	Sussex's Huckle My Buff	Charcuterie	31 January 2014
5	Chris Moyles	Curry Roast Shoulder of Lamb	New York Pizza	Colchester Pudding	Cold Smoker	7 February 2014
6	Jennifer Saunders & Dexter Fletcher	Porchetta with Jennifer Saunders & Ade Edmondson	Mexican Tortilla with Dexter Fletcher	The Bedfordshire Clanger	Sparkling Drinks	14 February 2014

=== Series 2 (2015) ===
Episode	Guest	Jamie's Recipe	Guest Recipe	Food Fight: Food Waste Mission	Jimmy's DIY Food Build	Airdate
1	Kate Hudson	Southern Fried Chicken	Goan Curry	Ugly Vegetables	Pizza Oven	2 January 2015
2	Tinie Tempah	Crispy Squid	Suya Kebab	Pullet Eggs	Gelato Maker	9 January 2015
3	Hugh Bonneville	Overnight Roast Shoulder of Pork	Pad Thai	Food Waste Restaurants	Deep South Hot Smoker	16 January 2015
4	Ellie Goulding	Steaming Ramen	'Ellie's' Vegan Burger	Gleaning	Chicken Rotisserie	23 January 2015
5	Michael Sheen	Pork Belly and Beef Brisket Chilli	Lamb Cawl	Nose to Tail Fish	Crispy Peking Duck Oven	30 January 2015
6	Paloma Faith	Chinese Ribs	Bacalhau a Bras	Wild Meat	Craft Micro-Brewery	13 February 2015

=== Series 3 (2016) ===
Episode	Guest	Jamie's Recipe	Guest Recipe	Food Fight: Food Waste Mission	Jimmy's DIY Food Build	Airdate
1	Orlando Bloom	Asian Seafood Parcels	Moroccan Tagine	Kid Goat	DIY Sausages	1 January 2016
2	Goldie Hawn	Middle Eastern Shoulder of Lamb	Fettuccine Alfredo	Scottish Langoustine	Smoked Salmon	8 January 2016
3	David Tennant	Arrosto Misto	Croatian Cuttlefish Risotto	Great British Charcuterie	Sourdough	15 January 2016
4	Jack Whitehall	Gurkha Curry	Chocolate Pizza	Bread Beer	Smoked Ham	22 January 2016
5	Fearne Cotton	Deep Southend Gumbo	Fish Tacos	British Herring	Coffee Bean Roaster	29 January 2016
6	Anna Friel	Meatball subs	Balinese Stew	Ugly Veg	Mozzarella	5 February 2016

=== Series 4 (2016–17) ===
Episode	Guest	Jamie's Recipe	Guest Recipe	Food Fight	Jimmy's Wild Food Weekend Challenge	Airdate
1	John Bishop	Thai Green Curry	Vegetarian Lasagne	Holiday Hunger	Wild Honey	30 December 2016
2	Salma Hayek	Roast Duck Pancakes	Lebanese Kibbeh	Mussels	Wild Mushrooms	6 January 2017
3	Lindsay Lohan	Venison	New York Pie	Black Pudding	Spear fishing	13 January 2017
4	Alesha Dixon	Salmon en croute	Spicy Prawns	Free-range Milk	Truffle	20 January 2017
5	Michael McIntyre	Meat Loaf	Scallops	Chicken Shops	Wild Crab and Lobster	27 January 2017
6	Scarlett Moffatt	Posh Fish Pie	Scotch Eggs	Community Fridge	Hāngī Game Feast	3 February 2017
7	Martin Clunes	Rack of Lamb	Mallorcan Paella	Sustainable Fish	Wild Booze	10 February 2017
8	Tom Daley	Carbonara Cake	Sweet and Sour Chicken	Old Dairy Cows	Seashore Tapas	17 February 2017

=== Series 5 (2017–18) ===
Upcoming episodes will star Johnny Vegas, Josh Hartnett, Greg Davies, Chris O'Dowd, Dawn O'Porter and Craig David.

Episode	Guest	Jamie's Recipe	Guest Recipe	Food Fight	Jimmy's DIY Food Build	Airdate
1	Simon Pegg	Provençal Pancakes	Lamb Tagine	Free-range duck	Korean Barbecue	24 November 2017
2	Joanna Lumley	Pastry Snake	Malay Vegetarian Curry	British Beans	Vertical Vegetable Garden	1 December 2017
3	Mark Hamill	Caesar Salad	Roast Beef and Yorkshire pud	Community Supermarkets	Wheel-barrow Seafood bake	8 December 2017
4	Sarah Millican	Game Pie	Pork Penne Pasta	Rose Veal	Soft-serve Ice-cream Dispenser	15 December 2017
5	Liv Tyler	Kedgeree	Dim Sum	British Mutton & Lamb	Steel drum barbecue & wood oven	22 December 2017
6	Ashley Jensen	Beef in parma ham	Truffle pasta	Baby food	Hot smoker shed	29 December 2017
7	Greg Davies	Welsh Lamb Kebab	Thai Green Curry	Energy drinks	Bean-hole oven and log "rocket" stove (made with an electric drill)	5 January 2018
8	Warwick Davis	Beef Pho	Beef and Stilton pie	Honey	Hog roast spit	12 January 2018
9	Chris O'Dowd & Dawn O'Porter	BBQ Ribs	Honeymoon Red Snapper	Breakfast Cereal	Tool-box steamer	19 January 2018
10	Craig David	Salmon parcel	Caribbean chicken	Seaweed	Dehydrator	26 January 2018
11	Johnny Vegas	Cannelloni with veal and nettles	Flambé steak	Salmon belly	Beer pump	2 February 2018
12	Josh Hartnett	Game-on curry	Pork ramen	BioAqua Farm	Butcher's block	9 February 2018

=== Series 6 (2018-19) ===
Series 6 was filmed in September 2018. The confirmed guests are Patrick Stewart, Jessica Ennis-Hill, Jodie Whittaker, Martin Freeman, Jessica Chastain, Harry Hill, Danny DeVito, Romesh Ranganathan, Stephen Fry, Russell Howard, Davina McCall and Stephen Mangan.

Episode	Guest	Jamie's Recipe	Guest Recipe	Food Fight	Jimmy's DIY Food Build	Airdate
1	Jodie Whittaker	Epic Pork Roast	Massaman Curry	British Brown Crabs	Barbecue 'Caribbean Chicken'	7 December 2018
2	Martin Freeman	Posh Fish & Chips	Eggs Royale	Healthy food for the night shift	Teppanyaki	14 December 2018
3	Danny DeVito	Korean-Inspired Chicken	Strascinati Con La Mollica	Healthy school meals	Smoking Tandoor	21 December 2018
4	Harry Hill	Steak & Two Sauces	Indian Thali	National Health Service	Schwenker Sausages	28 December 2018
5	Romesh Ranganathan	Vegan Dosa	Vegan Lasagna	Vegan Food	Cold-Pressed Juice	4 January 2019
6	Jessica Ennis-Hill	Katsu Curry	Pan-Seared Cod	Cage Eggs	Chocolate Fountain	11 January 2019
7	Stephen Fry	Seafood Risotto	Apple-Pie	British Charcoal	Campfire Chilli	18 January 2019
8	Jessica Chastain	Falafel Fritters	Tempura Rolls	Plant Based 'Milks'	Popcorn machine	25 January 2019
9	Patrick Stewart	Ultimate British Burger	Chicken Enchiladas	Beer Grain	Rotating garden	1 February 2019
10	Davina McCall	Gunpowder Lamb	Slow cooked-Rabbit	Cooking with teenagers	Beach BBQ	8 February 2019
11	Stephen Mangan	Homemade Ravioli	Sri Lankan Fish Curry	British Wild Venison	Roast Chicken on the go	15 February 2019
12	Russell Howard	Poached Chicken & Dumplings	Thai Curry	Energy Drinks	Kebab house	22 February 2019

=== Jamie and Jimmy's Festive Feast (2019) ===
Christmas special

Episode	Guest	Jamie's Recipe	Guest Recipe	Jimmy Cooks	Away from the Pier	Airdate	Airdate Germany
1	Taron Egerton	Roast turkey; Home-cured salmon	Mother's trifle	Christmas Snacks	Turkey Farm	25 December 2019	10 December 2020

=== Series 7 (2019) ===
Series 7 confirmed guests are Mary Berry, Ant & Dec

Episode	Guest	Jamie's Recipe	Guest Recipe	Jimmy Cooks	Away from the Pier	Airdate
1	Mary Berry	Mini Beef Wellington	Nostalgic Seafood Feast	Tear 'n' Share Bread	RAF	3 January 2020
2	Ant & Dec	Fiorentina steak	Japanese Feast	JFC (Jimmy's Fried Chicken)	Coffee Company	10 January 2020
3	Rob Beckett	Chicken & Mushroom Pie	Chinese Buffet	Potato Spirals & Stuffed Jalapeños	Watercress Farm	17 January 2020
4	Mel B	Mushroom Shawarma	Caribbean Chicken Curry	Prawns With Selfmade Sweet-Chili-Sauce	Buffalo Farm	24 January 2020
5	Claudia Winkleman	Paella	Butterchicken	Bacon Crisps	Gin Distillery	31 January 2020
6	Saoirse Ronan	Lamb Shank	General Tso's Chicken	Burger Sliders (made three ways)	Artisanal Chocolaterie	7 February 2020

=== Jamie and Jimmy's Festive Feast (2020) ===
Christmas special

Episode	Guest	Jamie's Recipe	Guest Recipes	Jimmy Makes	Airdate
1	Joe Wicks & Sam Smith	Italian-inspired roast pork with beans, greens and topped with pork crackling	Haggis tacos. Ravioli Alla Napoletana	Sparkling Mojito cocktail	29 December 2020

=== Series 8 (2021) ===
Series 8 confirmed guests are Jack Dee, Amir Khan, Joe Lycett and Susan Sarandon. Series 8 was filmed in 2019, before the COVID-19 pandemic.

Episode	Guest	Jamie's Recipe	Guest Recipe	Jimmy Cooks	Away from the Pier	Airdate
1	Jack Dee	Pot Roast Pork	French Rotisserie Chicken	Spicy Veggie Samosas	Nishkam SWAT	8 January 2021
2	Amir Khan	Malaysian-style Sea bass	Rack of lamb with collard greens and scalloped potatoes	Cheese and pepper Quesadillas	Cheesemaking	15 January 2021
3	Joe Lycett	Veggie Paneer Tikka Masala	Wild Boar Ragù	BBQ Pork Ribs	Trout fish farm	22 January 2021
4	Susan Sarandon	Sicilian-inspired chicken thighs	Seafood Gumbo	Crispy Pork Tacos	English Sparkling Winemaking	29 January 2021
