= British Hen Welfare Trust =

Charity in the United Kingdom

- Formation: 2005; 21 years ago
- Founder: Jane Howorth
- Registration no.: 1147356
- Legal status: Charity
- Purpose: Chicken rescue, Chicken welfare education
- Headquarters: Rose Ash, Devon, England
- Website: www.bhwt.org.uk

The British Hen Welfare Trust (formerly the Battery Hen Welfare Trust) is the United Kingdom's first registered charity solely for laying hens. It was founded in April 2005 by Jane Howorth, and was established in order to raise awareness of the 20 million hens kept in cages in the UK at that time. Its activities include collecting hens which have reached the end of their commercial lives and re-homing them as pets. The charity's headquarters are near Rose Ash, North Devon.

== Aims ==
The aim of the charity is to reduce consumer demand for caged (factory farmed) eggs, while encouraging support for the British egg industry. This also includes educating consumers about processed foods which contain eggs, such as: cake, pasta, chocolates (fondant filled), quiche, ready-made Yorkshire puddings, ready-made pancakes, biscuits, ready meals (TV dinners), and noodles. As of 2016, approximately 46% of UK battery eggs are used by food manufacturers and in the leisure industry.

The BHWT re-homes thousands of ex-commercial hens every year across the UK with the help of its volunteers. In 2021, the charity was made up of 12 employees, 5 trustees, and over 900 volunteers. The cumulative total of hens re-homed reached 500,000 in 2016, 840,000 in 2021. and 900,000 in 2022.

All the hens are taken out of the farms and re-homed the same day. This means they can go from cage to backyard pet in as little as a few hours. The charity wants hens to be viewed as pets, rather than livestock, and regularly promotes the benefits of keeping hens as pets through national and regional PR. The BHWT regularly talks about the joy of seeing a hen in daylight for the first time. These birds have never sun bathed, dust bathed, nor stood on solid ground before.

The Trust seeks to work and cooperate with farmers instead of condemning them. It does not concur with any extremist views or tactics and is not associated with any other organisation or group linked in any way to battery hens. Patrons of the charity include Bob Mortimer, Jamie Oliver, Pam Ayres, Amanda Holden, the Duchess of Richmond, Kate Humble, Philippa Forrester, Julia Kendell, Jimmy Doherty and Antony Worrall Thompson.

== Campaigns and awards ==
The Trust has successfully campaigned to change the food industry, playing a part in Hellmanns making the switch to using only free-range eggs in its mayonnaise.

Jane Howorth, the charity's founder and chief executive, was appointed MBE in the 2016 New Year Honours for services to battery hen welfare.

== See also ==
- Chickens as pets
- Yarding
- Pastured poultry
- Organic egg production
