= Monroe v Hopkins =

2017 libel case

Monroe v Hopkins was a 2017 libel case in the High Court of England and Wales. It was brought by the food writer and activist Jack Monroe against the columnist Katie Hopkins after Hopkins falsely alleged that Monroe had vandalised a war memorial. Hopkins was ordered to pay hundreds of thousands of pounds in damages and legal fees.

== Background ==
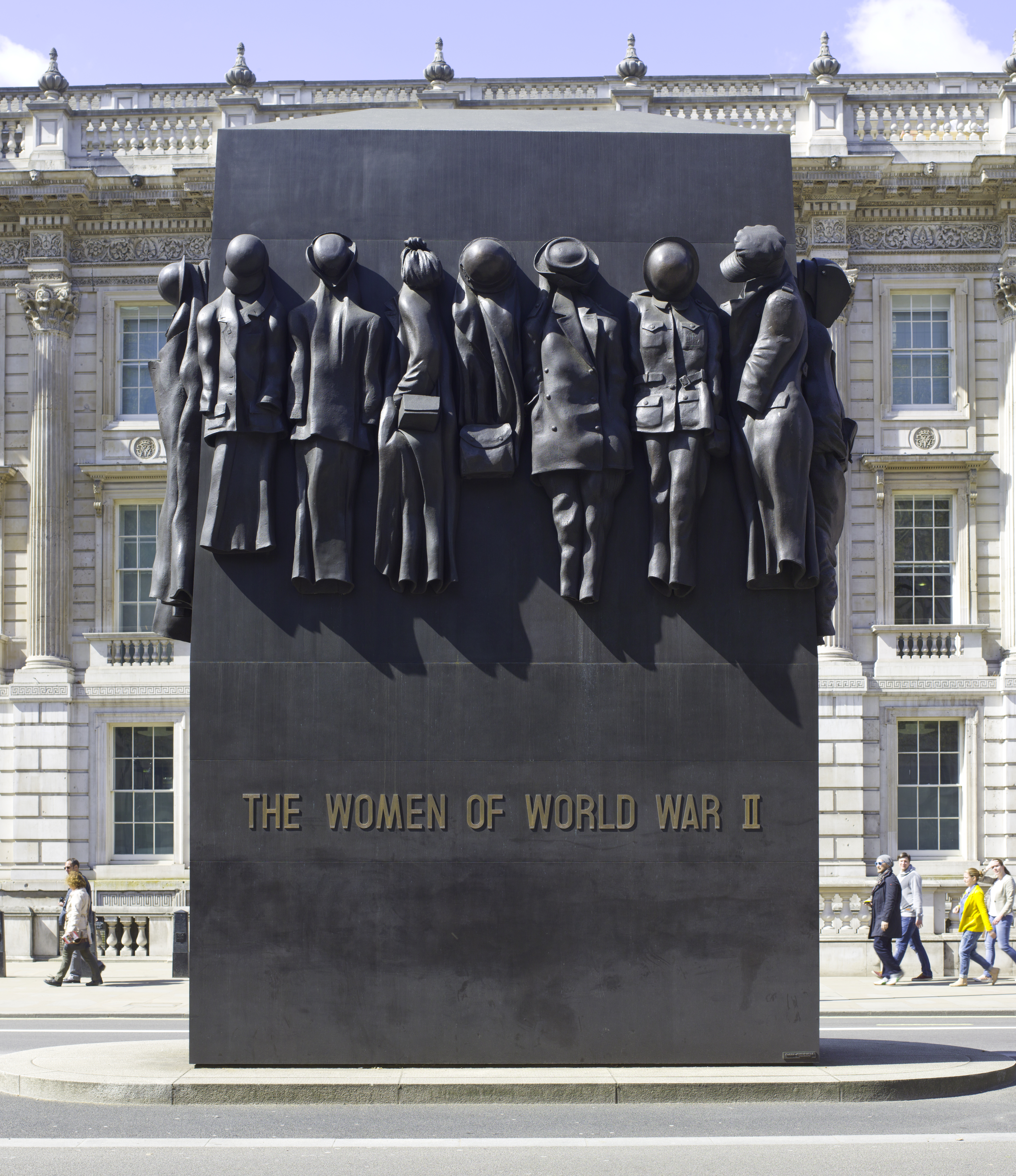
Monument to the Women of World War II

During an anti-austerity protest in 2015, protesters spraypainted "fuck Tory scum" on the Monument to the Women of World War II in Whitehall, London. On the social media site Twitter, the political writer Laurie Penny said she had no problem with the vandalism. Katie Hopkins, a rightwing columnist, reacted negatively, suggesting that Penny be sent to join the Islamic State. Both writers' comments received national media coverage.

On 18 May, a few days later, Hopkins tweeted to the food writer Jack Monroe: "Scrawled on any war memorials recently?" Monroe responded that she had never vandalised a war memorial and had family members in the armed forces. Hopkins responded in a tweet asking someone to explain the difference between Penny (an "irritant") and Monroe ("social anthrax").

Monroe asked for a retraction via Twitter and was blocked by Hopkins. Monroe asked Hopkins to make a public apology and give £5,000 to "migrant rescue" as a settlement to prevent the matter going to court. Hopkins did neither, and the matter proceeded to court.

== Decision ==
On 10 March 2017, Mr Justice Warby judged that the two tweets sent by Hopkins were defamatory to Monroe (according to the Defamation Act 2013) and were the source of "serious harm", a prerequisite for demonstrating libel. The court assessed the damage to Monroe at £24,000—£16,000 for the first tweet, and £8,000 for the second. Hopkins was also ordered to pay costs, estimated at over £300,000. Warby's judgment discussed the difficulty of applying English libel law to new media platforms such as Twitter, and contains an extended discussion of how Twitter functions.

== Aftermath ==
Some days after the decision, Hopkins, who did not appear in court, stated that she was "very likely" to appeal against the ruling, on the grounds that no evidence of harm had been produced in the court. About two and a half weeks after the judgment, Hopkins was told she could not appeal; Warby said Hopkins' appeal would not have "a real prospect of success", in his view.

A week after the verdict, Monroe said she bore "no ill will" towards Hopkins: "Although what she said about me was wrong and the last two years have been a grim process, I would happily sit down and talk as adults. I just think the world is a bit better when you are willing to give people chances." Monroe said she hoped the case will set a precedent and improve Twitter.

Hopkins sold her Exeter home in March 2018 to pay the debts arising from the case, and applied for an individual voluntary arrangement in May. Monroe said of the news: "My offer of a cup of tea still stands if she wants to talk about it ... Lots of people are celebrating but I’m not. It's a sad, lonely sort of anticlimax. It’s really crap and I feel really bad it’s all ended up like this. I thought she'd just say sorry." Social media users ironically pointed to a tweet Hopkins published in 2014 in which she said "The only thing people in debt have in common other than bad money management, is an ability to blame anyone but themselves."

== See also ==
- McAlpine v Bercow - Previous case of libel on Twitter, cited in Monroe v Hopkins
