= Saint Caradoc =

Welsh hermit and harpist

- Born: Wales
- Died: 1124; Haroldston, Wales
- Venerated in: Roman Catholic Church
- Feast: 13 April

Caradoc or Caradog (died 1124) was a reclusive Welsh priest, widely respected for his sanctity. An inquiry into his qualifications for sainthood was commissioned in 1200 and, although such inquiry did not proceed, he has long been venerated as if papally canonised. Prior to canonisation of the Forty Martyrs in 1970, he was regarded as the last Welshman to become a saint.

== Recorded life ==
A native of Brecknockshire, (Note: Most modern commentaries state he was of “noble” birth, but the earliest surviving and therefore probably most authoritative source, perhaps an extract from Gerald of Wales’s biography of Caradoc, simply refers to his parents as “well-established” (“parentibus non infirmis propagatus”): see Carl Horstman (ed.), Nova Legenda Angliae: as collected by John of Tynemouth, John Capgrave, and others, and first printed, with New Lives, by Wynkyn de Worde AD MDXVI, Clarendon Press, Oxford, 1901, Vol. I, p. 174.) Caradoc obtained a place at the court of Rhys ap Tewdwr who ruled much of South Wales in the late eleventh century. At court he played several musical instruments, most notably the harp, and was admitted to considerable intimacy with Rhys. However, when he lost two of his master’s most valuable greyhounds, (Note: It has been suggested that Caradoc may have been Rhys’s chief huntsman: John Edward Lloyd, A History of Wales from the Earliest Times to the Edwardian Conquest, Longmans, Green & Co., London, 1912, Vol. II, p. 591 at n. 88.) Rhys threatened him with mutilation and death.

Caradoc responded by declaring “I will go and serve another Master who values men higher than hounds” and embarked upon a celibate and monastic life. Making a staff from his lance, he journeyed to Llandaff with some companions and there received the clerical tonsure from Bishop Herewald.

For some time afterwards his devotions were conducted at the church of St Teilo (at what is now Llandeilo) but, seeking a more isolated place in which to practise his faith, he removed to the deserted shrine of St Cenydd at Llangennech. There he cleared the thorns and thistles from a site next to the burial-ground and constructed a dwelling that served as his first oratory.

His reputation for sanctity became widespread and he went to St David’s (then known as Meneva) either in response to a summons from Bishop Bernard or in submission to divine instruction. At St David’s he was ordained a priest and displayed supposed healing powers when, by a touch of his hand, the edema of a young woman was dispersed.

He next withdrew to “the island called Ary” on the Pembrokeshire coast. (Note: Henry Owen (1844-1919) identified this as a coastal tract called the Island of Barry in the parish of Llanrhian: see The Description of Pembrokeshire by George Owen of Henllys, Lord of Kemes, Edited, with Notes and an Appendix by Henry Owen, London, 1892, pp. 113-114. And see John Edward Lloyd, A History of Wales, Vol. II, p. 592.) After he and his companions were briefly carried off Ary by Norwegian pirates, Bishop Bernard appointed him to a more secure base at Haroldston St Issells in the cartref of Rhos (Note: This is “Monasterium Sancti Hismaelis in Rosensi provincia” (Horstman, Vol. I, p. 175) as identified by Sir John Lloyd in A History of Wales, Vol. II, p. 592 at n. 91. Caradoc’s cell is generally thought to have been on Portfield, a common on the south-west fringe of Haverfordwest; this was the site of St Caradoc’s Well around which a pleasure fair was regularly held on or about Caradoc’s feast day. The well was covered over by a road when the common was enclosed in 1842: Edward Laws, The History of Little England Beyond Wales, George Bell & Sons, London, 1888, p. 139.) where he remained from about 1105 until his death. He is sometimes spoken of as “Caradoc of Rhos”. The thirteenth century parish church of Lawrenny, about eight miles from Haroldston by river route, is dedicated to him.

During his time in Rhos, the local countryside was, at the instigation of Henry I, increasingly settled by Flemish immigrants. Influential among these was one Tancred who built, near Haroldston, a castle that became the nucleus for the town of Haverfordwest. Tancred and his wife sent Caradoc frequent gifts of food, and these were carried to Haroldston by their son Richard FitzTancred who hunted in the district. Caught in a downpour of rain during one hunt, Richard sought shelter with Caradoc but, despite much shouting and coaxing, was unable to persuade his hounds to enter the holy man’s habitation. However, by a slight gesture of his hand Caradoc drew the dogs into his home.

== Death and bodily remains ==
It is said that, in April 1124 while he was preparing for Easter, two men in glittering stoles entered his church; between them they carried a golden altar on which was written “Follow us, we have meat to eat that thou knowest not of.” To Caradoc’s question of when he would feast with them, they replied that it would be “at the Lamb’s high banquet.” He was taken with fever four days later and died on Low Sunday.

His last wish was to be buried at St David’s (which in the previous year had been declared a centre of pilgrimage for the Western world) but his body was seized by Tancred. (Note: Sir John Lloyd attributes the seizure to Tancred’s reluctance to lose a relic of such virtue and sanctity from the neighbourhood over which he had authority. However, the relationship between the two men had been troubled: despite the gifts of food, Caradoc was “much harassed” by Tancred who impounded his cattle and sheep: John Edward Lloyd, A History of Wales, Vol. II, p. 592; Baring-Gould and Fisher, Vol. II, p. 77.) Tancred promptly fell ill and, fearing his sickness was retribution for the seizure, ordered release of the corpse; he immediately recovered but it was only after this sequence of events had been twice repeated that Caradoc’s remains proceeded to St David’s. As the funeral cortege crossed Newgale Sands, torrential rainfall caused the whole countryside to run with water; it was afterwards said that when those in the funeral retinue emerged from shelter they found Caradoc’s bier, which was covered by a silken pall, to be completely dry. (Note: A chapel, later known as “Cradock’s Chapel”, was erected to mark the place where the bier had rested but this had disappeared by the twentieth century: Baring-Gould and Fisher, Vol. II, p. 77.)

The body was first interred with great honour in the left aisle of the church at St David’s beside the altar of the protomartyr St Stephen. A few years later it was exhumed for transfer to a newly-built church in the settlement (Note: The new church was dedicated by Bishop Bernard in 1131, soon after the canonisation of St David, and Caradoc’s translation probably occurred shortly afterwards; this church was replaced by the present cathedral in 1179-80: Philip A. Robson, The Cathedral Church of St David’s, A Short History and Description of the Fabric and Episcopal Buildings, George Bell & Sons, London, 1901.) and was reportedly found in a remarkable state of preservation, “uncorrupt and undefiled”. Among those witnessing this was William of Malmesbury who, overcome by devotion, tried to break off a finger from Caradoc’s hand; by William’s own account he was terrified when, as he unclasped the closed fist into an open palm, the whole hand withdrew into the sleeve of Caradoc’s funeral shroud.

In his Itinerarium Cambriae of 1191, Gerald of Wales reported that in their new resting place Caradoc’s remains were “the cause of many miracles, and so it will continue to be in the future”. Nevertheless, in 1538 Bishop William Barlow, seeking to suppress what he regarded as idolatry, had all saintly relics cleared from their shrines in St David’s Cathedral.

In 1866, during restoration work at the Cathedral, what were thought to be the bones of three humans were discovered behind a blocked-up recess. The bones were subsequently placed in a casket and buried beneath the Cathedral’s floor, and in the 1920s a belief sprang up that they might be the remains of Saints David, Justinian of Ramsey Island and Caradoc. The belief persisted and in the 1990s the casket was disinterred so that the bones might be subjected to radiocarbon dating. This process established them to be, by several centuries, of more recent origin than the time of Saints David and Justinian but they included the bones of “an 11th or 12th century man who ate a lot of fish” – allowing, it was said, the possibility that this was Caradoc.

== Investigation for sainthood ==
In May 1200 Gerald of Wales obtained from Pope Innocent III a letter commissioning inquiry into the qualifications for canonisation of “the Venerable Caradog whose honourable behaviour during his life and the miracles performed after his death have long since come to the notice of the Holy See”. (Note: Gerald several times visited Rome, seeking to have St David’s confirmed as a metropolitan see which was not subservient to Canterbury and therefore free to elect its own bishop (or archbishop). His advocacy of the canonisation of Caradoc may have been an element in this wider campaign.) The commissioners appointed were the Abbots of Whitland, St Dogmaels, and Strata Florida, but the first two of these procured the suppression of the letter on account of their jealousy of Gerald’s claims to the St David’s bishopric, and the inquiry did not proceed.

In his Epistola ad capitulum Herfordense de libris a se scriptis, Gerald claimed to have written a Life of Saint Caradoc (Vita Sancti Karadoci). Probably compiled in support of the canonisation initiative, this has not survived, but the biographical accounts of Caradoc in Nova Legenda Angliae and Acta Sanctorum may be excerpts from it.

== Reputation and legacy ==
When his remains were removed to a new resting place, probably during the 1130s, Caradoc was a widely venerated figure, as evident from William of Malmesbury’s recorded presence at the translation. According to Sir John Lloyd, the holy man’s “learning” had been renowned throughout Wales some two decades earlier, but this assertion seems to rely on his being “Magister Caradog… the most learned in all Wales, skilled in the knowledge of both ancient and modern law,” who had visited Bardsey Island around 1115. Such identification is most probably erroneous, and other sources suggest Caradoc’s reputation during his lifetime was limited to his religious devotion, perhaps coupled with healing powers.

Indications of the manner in which he practised his devotion vary. In the Welsh language, he is styled Caradog Fynach, that is “Caradog the Monk”, emphasising his membership of a religious community. Perhaps more frequently, as in Nova Legenda Angliae and Acta Sanctorum, he is described as a hermit, (Note: Baring-Gould and Fisher, Vol. II, p. 75, categorises him as “Monk, Confessor”. When, in 1918, there was installed on the south side of the nave of St Mary's Church, Haverfordwest, a stained-glass window incorporating an image of Caradoc, he was described by the catch-all “priest, monk, hermit and confessor”: Haverfordwest and Milford Haven Telegraph, 13 March 1918, p. 3.) but accounts of his life before 1105 reveal that he lived with “companions” and, if he was truly the “Magister Caradog” who visited Bardsey, his purpose there was to rescue the local hermit from eremitic life. Sir John Lloyd, Caradoc’s principal modern biographer, categorised him as a recluse.

Folklore supplements ancient record in present-day portrayal of Caradoc and, though the saint was once a musician at the court of a Welsh prince, there is no authority for claiming he afterwards enjoyed celebrity as a harpist. The suggestion that he possessed “unusual power over the lower animals” probably has no greater justification than his mustering of Richard FitzTancred’s hounds. Nevertheless he is now widely regarded as the patron saint of harpists and of dog-lovers.

What is believed to be Caradoc’s tomb is behind the choir-stalls and open to the north transept of the present St David’s Cathedral. Between the shelf and the arch of the tomb is a tapestry embroidered with symbols and images traditionally associated with the saint.

A 13th century calendar of saints in the Cotton MSS indicates that Caradoc was originally venerated on 14 April, but his feast-day is now 13 April which is traditionally said to have been the day of his death. He is commemorated in the name of one of the three houses to which pupils are allocated under the house system at Rougemont School in Monmouthshire.
