= Rougemont School =

Coordinates: 51.62155°N 3.01253°W

Location
- Malpas Road; Llantarnam, NP20 6QB; Wales

Information
- Type: Private day school
- Motto: A school for life
- Established: 1926; 100 years ago
- Local authority: Torfaen
- Headmistress: Lisa Pritchard
- Gender: Co-educational
- Age: 3 to 18
- Enrolment: 600~
- Houses: Gwynog, Dyfrig, Caradog
- Colours: Red, Black, Grey
- Affiliations: Headmasters' and Headmistresses' Conference
- Website: http://www.rougemontschool.co.uk/

Rougemont School (Welsh: Ysgol Rougemont) is a private co-educational day school located in the manor house Llantarnam Hall located between Newport and Cwmbran, South Wales. The school offers education for three to eighteen year-olds.

== History ==
The school was founded in 1926 as a private prep school for junior children and began life in a building called Rougemont House on Clevedon Road, Newport. Under the ownership of the Evans family, in 1931 it expanded into an adjacent house. By 1946, the school was housed in Nant Coch House, Risca Road, Newport, and the number of pupils had increased to about 200. When the Evanses retired in 1974, a number of families raised a loan to buy the school, electing a board of nine governors. The Stow Hill buildings, formerly housing the Convent of St Joseph were purchased, and classes were extended first to Common Entrance level, then to O-levels, and finally in 1983 the first A-levels were taken, under the leadership of Frank Edwards. The site at Nant Coch was retained as a pre-preparatory department. Succeeding years saw two changes of leadership, namely headmasters Richard Ham (1988–1991) and Graham Sims (1991–1995). Ham's tenure as headmaster was cut short by his sudden death in 1991.

The school moved to its present site, Llantarnam Hall, a large Victorian mansion set in 50 acres (200,000 m^{2}) of parkland on the outskirts of Newport, in 1992. The building that currently houses the infant school is named for Nant Coch.

== Present day ==
The school day starts at 8.50 am and formally finishes at 4 pm, but there are extra-curricular activities available if wanted until 6 pm. With 55 acres of grounds, much learning is taken outdoors, in the outdoor classrooms and the sports facilities.

The present headmistress is Lisa Pritchard, appointed in 2023, previously head of the prep school, who succeeded Robert Carnevale on his retirement.

== Notable former pupils ==
- Natasha Asghar, Member of the Welsh Parliament
- William Bragg, cricketer
- Matt Tebbutt, chef and television food presenter
- Richard Parks, Welsh international rugby union player
- Banita Sandhu, actress
- Ross Leadbetter, of Only Men Aloud!
