= Richard Parks =

Wales international rugby union player (born 1977)

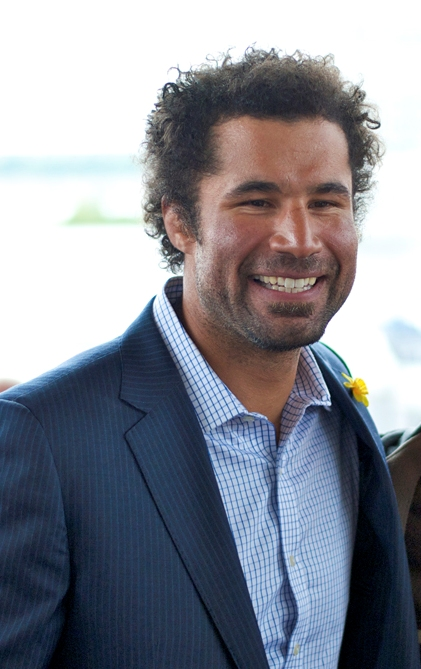
- Born: Richard David Parks; 14 August 1977 (age 49) Pontypridd, Wales
- Height: 6 ft 1 in (185 cm)
- Weight: 233 lb (106 kg)
- School: Michaelhouse; Rougemont School; Monmouth School

Rugby union career
- Position: Back row
Senior career
Years	Team	Apps	(Points)
1996–1998	Newport	62	(10)
1999–2003	Pontypridd	97	(0)
2003–2004	Celtic Warriors	24	(0)
2004–2006	Leeds Tykes	45	(10)
2006–2007	Perpignan	11	(0)
2007–2009	Dragons	30	(5)
International career
Years	Team	Apps	(Points)
2002–2003	Wales	4	(0)

Richard David Parks (born 14 August 1977) is a former Wales international rugby union player turned extreme endurance athlete and television presenter.

In rugby he represented Newport RFC, Pontypridd RFC, Celtic Warriors, Leeds Tykes, Perpignan and Newport Gwent Dragons over a professional career which spanned 13 years. In May 2009 he was forced to retire from rugby due to a shoulder injury.

== Early years ==
Parks was born on 14 August 1977 in Pontypridd to a Jamaican mother, Lee, and a Welsh father, Derek Parks. Richard grew up in Newport, Wales and attended Rougemont School, Newport and Monmouth School.

Parks first started playing rugby at the age of 11 at Rougemont School and progressed quickly through the school ranks playing at flanker throughout. He was selected for Welsh Schools at under-18 level and then had a brief spell with Newport youth before spending a year in South Africa in 1996 at Michaelhouse, a boarding school for senior boys in Durban. He competed for the first team at Michaelhouse whilst he studied A-level chemistry in order to gain entry to Cardiff University to study dentistry.

Whilst in South Africa, Parks was invited to join the Natal Under-19s academy but this would have required him to attend university in South Africa. He wanted to play for Wales, and so he chose to return home to take a contract up with Newport Rugby Football Club, and sign his first professional contract as a rugby player.

== Newport RFC ==
In his first year at Newport RFC (1996–97) Parks was selected to play for the Welsh sevens team in Tokyo, Japan and in his second year, he was called up to train with the Welsh senior team. At the end of this season (1997–98), he was voted most promising player of the year by his club, winning the Arthur Boucher Award.

Park's third season with Newport RFC saw him struck down with injury. He missed most of the season after suffering a stress fracture of his spine. After taking longer to recover than anticipated, he was released from his contract at Newport RFC after 62 appearances and finished the season playing university rugby for Cardiff Meds.

== Pontypridd and playing for Wales ==
Parks was subsequently signed by Pontypridd RFC for the following season, and in 2001 Parks represented the Welsh Sevens in the 2001 Rugby World Cup Sevens in Argentina. Pontypridd won the Principality Cup in 2002 and reached the Parker Pen Shield final losing 22 – 25 to Sale Sharks.

Many of the Pontypridd squad, including Parks, were called up to represent Wales on a tour to South Africa. He earned his first full international cap on 8 June 2002, coming on as a substitute in a 34–19 defeat to South Africa in Free State Stadium, Bloemfontein. He became the 1001st player to represent Wales.

During the next season, Parks was selected for the autumn international series where he gained his second cap against Fiji. A final season at Pontypridd continued and Parks remained in the Welsh squad. He was named in the 6 Nations squad but did not feature on a match day. During the summer of 2003, he was selected in the preliminary World Cup squad and played warm-up games against Scotland and Ireland. However, he missed out on final section to the World Cup in Australia.

== Celtic Warriors ==
Following the Introduction of regional rugby union teams in Wales in 2003, Parks was signed to the newly formed Celtic Warriors. He played the whole of that new look 2003–04 season out of position at number 8 due to injuries in the squad, finishing with 19 appearances.

Following the demise of the region after only one season, Parks joined the then Welsh head coach Phil Davies at Leeds Tykes.

== Leeds and Perpignan ==
After a difficult start to the 2004–05 season through injury, Parks became an influential member of the Leeds squad and was at times named as vice captain.

At the beginning of 2005 following injuries to key players, Leeds were bottom of the Zurich Premiership and some way adrift of their rivals. Despite the threat of relegation they made it to their first ever Powergen Cup final in 2005, defeating Bath 20–12 at Twickenham to claim their first ever trophy.

Following the cup win they went on to win five straight games and avoided relegation finishing the season in eighth position. The following season saw the Tykes lose their first eight games in three different competitions, and were relegated at the end of the season. Parks subsequently signed for USA Perpignan for the 2006–07 season. However, due to a failure to gain sufficient game time, Parks returned to Wales for the 2007–08 season with the Newport Gwent Dragons.

== Newport Gwent Dragons ==
Parks tore his knee ligaments in the Boxing Day derby against Cardiff Blues, marking the start of a long line of injuries, which ultimately led to his retirement from rugby. Early in his second season with the Dragons, Parks injured his shoulder in a tackle. He continued to play and then had an operation over Christmas to treat the injury. He returned to action at the beginning of the year but his shoulder problem reoccurred. In May 2009, he was advised the damage to his shoulder was irreversible and following the second operation on his shoulder that year, he was advised he should not play rugby any more. He had made 30 appearances for the Dragons. He retired from rugby on 26 May 2009 aged 31.

== 737 Challenge and other expeditions ==
Following his retirement from rugby, Parks embarked on a challenge to climb the highest mountain on each of the world's seven continents and complete the Three Poles Challenge within seven months.

On 12 December 2010, Parks left Cardiff on the centenary of the departure from the city of the ill-fated Terra Nova Expedition, led by Robert Falcon Scott. He was joined on parts of his 737 Challenge by Olympic rower Steve Williams and Marie Curie nurse Janet Suart.

He completed each leg of the 737 Challenge on the following dates:

- Leg 1: The South Pole – 27 December 2010, 6.10 am GMT
- Leg 2: Mount Vinson – 8 January 2011
- Leg 3: Aconcagua – 5 February 2011, 5.54 pm GMT
- Leg 4: Kilimanjaro – 27 February 2011, 4.57 am GMT
- Leg 5: Carstensz Pyramid – 15 March 2011, 11.28 pm GMT
- Leg 6: The North Pole – 11 April 2011, 2.20 pm BST
- Leg 7: Everest – 25 May 2011, 2.57 am BST
- Leg 8: Denali – 30 June 2011, 8.08 am BST
- Leg 9: Elbrus – 12 July 2011, 8.53 am BST

On 12 July 2011 he completed the challenge after six months 11 days.

In December 2012, he attempted to ski solo and unsupported to the South Pole from Hercules Inlet on the Antarctic coast. In January he had to abandon the attempt as due to poor health and bad weather conditions. He subsequently returned to Antarctica at the end of 2013, and on 4 January 2014 he completed an unsupported and unassisted journey to the South Pole, covering 1,150 km (715 miles) in 29 days, 19 hours and 24 minutes, the fastest solo for a Briton.

== TV Documentaries ==
Pole to pole with Will Smith 2026 Parks' 737 Challenge was filmed for a BBC Cymru Wales documentary; "Richard Parks – Conquering the World" and was transmitted in 3 parts from Tuesday 26 July 2011. It has since been distributed across the globe. Filmed by Sports Media Services, the documentary showed the emotional and inspirational journey as he reached seven summits and three poles in seven months. A version has subsequently been released on iTunes.

In 2014, Parks' first network television series was broadcast on Channel 5. Filmed by Zig Zag Productions, it followed a year of preparation and then completion of endurance races, as well as skiing solo and unsupported to the South Pole.

2016 marked the production and release of a documentary series and a standalone documentary with Parks, both produced by One Tribe TV. A 3-part BBC One Wales and BBC Two series, "Extreme Wales with Richard Parks", was released in September. "Richard Parks on Everest", a 60-minute documentary for BBC One Wales following his progress earlier in the year on Project Everest Cynllun, was broadcast in October.

In 2025 Parks was the presenter of a series of very short programmes (4 – 6 minutes) on channel S4C about significant events in Welsh history. This made use of his developing knowledge of the Welsh language.

== Honours and awards ==
- 2005 – One Powergen Cup/Anglo-Welsh Cup title
- 2012 – Won Just Giving Celebrity Fundraiser of the year.
- 2012 – Awarded the Rugby Writers' Club Special Award which was previously awarded to the likes of Phil Vickery, Sir Clive Woodward and Sir Ian McGeechan.
- 2012 – Awarded The 'Chancellors Medal' by the University of Glamorgan.
- 2012 – Awarded an Honorary Fellowship by the University of Wales.
- 2012 – Selected to carry the Olympic Torch.
- 2012 – Named in the Business Insider's top 100 most influential people in Wales
- 2012 – Invited to meet the Queen at Buckingham Palace.
- 2012 – Alongside 737 Challenge design partner Limegreentangerine, won a national CIM Marketing Excellence Award, winning SME of the year at the 2012 CIM Marketing Excellence Awards.
- 2013 – Awarded an Honorary fellowship by Cardiff University.
- 2018 – Included in a list of 100 Brilliant, Black and Welsh people in Black History Month in the United Kingdom.
