= Katie Hopkins =

English media personality (born 1975)

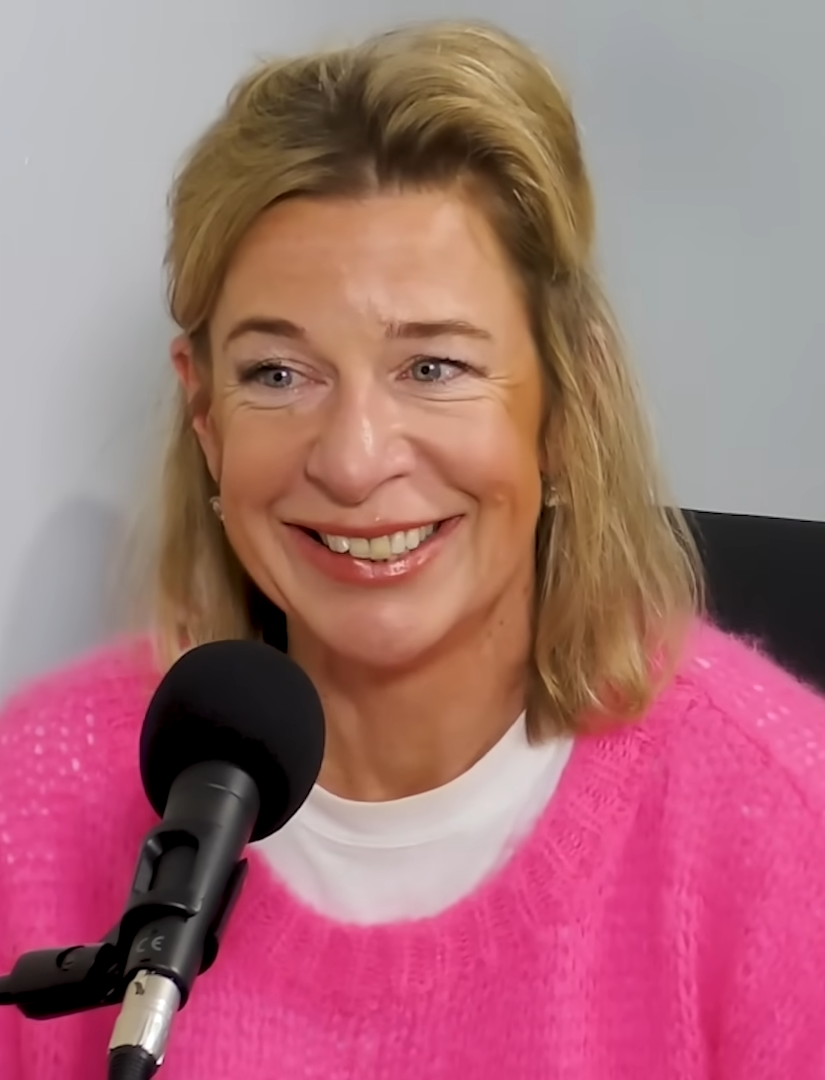
- Hopkins in 2023
- Born: Katie Olivia Hopkins; 13 February 1975 (age 51); Barnstaple, Devon, England
- Education: University of Exeter; Royal Military Academy Sandhurst
- Occupations: Media personality; political commentator; columnist; businesswoman
- Years active: 2007–present
- Political party: UK Independence Party (since 2021)
- Spouses: Damian McKinney (m. 2004; div. 2005) Mark Cross (m. 2010)
- Children: 3
- Website: katiesarms.com

Katie Olivia Hopkins (born 13 February 1975) is an English media personality, far-right political commentator, and former columnist and businesswoman. She came to prominence as a contestant on the third series of the reality show The Apprentice in 2007. She later became known for her outspoken views and controversial social media presence, which received significant publicity.

In 2007, Hopkins appeared on the seventh series of the reality show I'm a Celebrity...Get Me Out of Here!. In 2015, she appeared on the fifteenth series of the reality show Celebrity Big Brother, where she finished as runner-up, and hosted her own talk show, If Katie Hopkins Ruled the World. The following year, Hopkins became a presenter for the talk radio station LBC and underwent major brain surgery to relieve the severity of her epilepsy. She has also been a columnist for British national newspapers, including The Sun and MailOnline. In 2021, Hopkins joined the UK Independence Party (UKIP).

Hopkins has attracted controversy, media scrutiny and some legal issues for her views and statements on UK politics, social class, migrants and race. In 2016, her former employer MailOnline was forced to pay significant damages to a Muslim family whom she had falsely accused of extremist links. In the 2017 libel case Monroe v Hopkins, Hopkins was required to pay damages and legal costs to food writer Jack Monroe after making defamatory remarks on Twitter. Her role at LBC was terminated in May 2017 following her comments on Twitter about the Manchester Arena bombing. Hopkins was permanently suspended from Twitter in June 2020 for what the company described as "violations of our hateful conduct policy", but her account was reinstated in November 2023.

== Early life and education ==
Katie Olivia Hopkins was born on 13 February 1975, in Barnstaple, England. Her father was an electrical engineer for the local Electricity Board, and her mother was a bank teller. She has an older sister. She was brought up in Bideford, attended a private convent school from age three to 16, played sports and learned to play the piano and violin. As a child she believed she was "going to be the colonel of the forces. I loved the military. I loved the discipline, the rigour, the big shouty men."

Hopkins studied Economics at the University of Exeter, receiving sponsorship from the British Army Intelligence Corps. She spent weekends with the Officers' Training Corps. She completed her military training at the Royal Military Academy Sandhurst, but had an epileptic seizure during the final passing-out ceremony, and as a result was unable to take up her commission. Hopkins said she kept her epilepsy secret while attending Sandhurst, as this would have prevented her from being commissioned. Instead, she joined a business consultancy and moved to Manhattan, New York City, before returning to the UK in 2005. In September 2006 she joined the Met Office as a global brand consultant.

== Career ==
=== The Apprentice ===
In late 2006 Hopkins was allowed to take unpaid leave from her Met Office job as part of her probationary period of employment to take part in series 3 of the reality TV show The Apprentice. In the format used at that time, contestants in The Apprentice competed for a £100,000-a-year job working for the businessman Alan Sugar. Hopkins rejected Sugar's offer of a place in the final episode of the programme, citing problems regarding childcare provision for her daughters, and withdrew from the competition at the end of the penultimate task. The episode gained 6.2 million viewers, while the following You're Fired! episode, in which Hopkins was interviewed, was watched by 3.1 million.

Throughout her time on The Apprentice, Hopkins made several critical comments on camera. The comments were directed at her fellow contestants, viewers of television shopping channels, maternity leave, fake tans, and overweight people. Four Weddings and a Funeral and Notting Hill writer Richard Curtis expressed his distaste for Hopkins; while accepting his Fellowship award at the 2007 BAFTA awards, he jokingly vowed to kill her. When video clips of her comments about other candidates were shown on The Apprentice: You're Fired!, following up on the main programme, Hopkins said that they were "quite funny". Michelle Mone, the founder of lingerie company Ultimo and a guest on the panel, criticised Hopkins, calling her "exceptionally selfish", said she was not to be trusted, and accused her of giving "businesswomen a bad name". Sugar was criticised over his questioning of Hopkins about her childcare arrangements, and accused of violating the Sex Discrimination Act 1975. The incident received substantial media comment. Sugar argued his case in an interview with GMTV host Fiona Phillips, stating that he was aware of the rules.

==== Aftermath ====
In June 2007, Hopkins lost her job at the Met Office, which said she did not meet the required standards to complete her probationary period, and it confirmed that her performance on The Apprentice and confessions about her private life were a factor in her dismissal. Hopkins later stated that the media were informed of her dismissal an hour after she was fired. After her appearance on The Apprentice, Hopkins signed two deals to sell her story, one with the News of the World newspaper and the other with EMAP, the company behind Heat and Grazia magazines.

Hopkins said in an interview with BBC Radio Kent that she had great respect for Sugar and that she believed she would have won the programme had she been in the final episode. She also said that the media's attitudes towards her did not affect her but did affect her family. She made a similar claim of hypothetical victory in an interview with Fiona Phillips on the morning of the final Apprentice episode, although Sugar had said that if she had wanted to press on, he would have fired her, whoever she was competing with. Hopkins told BBC Radio 1 that she had not yet ruled out a media career but expressed interest in starting a business venture.

=== Media career ===
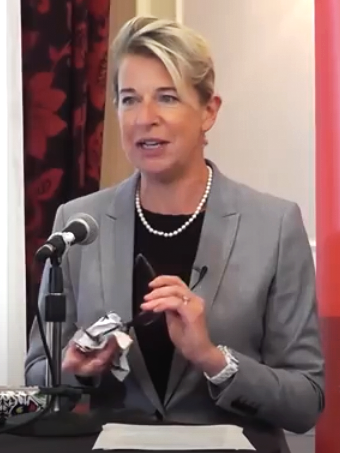
Hopkins in 2018

After The Apprentice, Hopkins appeared in an episode of 8 Out of 10 Cats, and was a guest star on Loose Women and The Friday Night Project. In 2007, she presented a Five Live Report on family life and working mothers for BBC Radio 5 Live and contributed an article on the same subject to BBC Online.

In 2007, Hopkins joined the series I'm a Celebrity... Get Me Out of Here! as a replacement for Malcolm McLaren, who dropped out just before the show started. In January 2015, she took part in the Channel 5 reality series Celebrity Big Brother, finishing in second place.

Hopkins has appeared twice on Question Time, in the programmes of 10 June 2010 and 27 January 2011. She also appeared on the Young Voters' version of Question Time on 20 October 2010. She appeared on an episode of 10 O'Clock Live on 24 April 2013, alongside Theo Paphitis and Owen Jones, to discuss the legacy of the former British prime minister Margaret Thatcher, who had died that month, and to debate tax policies and the division of wealth among British citizens.

In 2015, she deliberately gained and lost 3 stone (42 lb; 19 kg) over the course of several months, in an attempt to show that obese people can diet successfully. Her progress was documented by a camera crew and then played on a programme called My Fat Story for TLC. TLC claimed an audience figure of 10 million in the UK and US for the programme.

Later that year, she began her own chat show, If Katie Hopkins Ruled the World, on the digital channel TLC. She said she wanted to bring a new approach to chat and panel shows. The series was cancelled in December, after the first series, owing to low audience ratings.

From April 2016 to May 2017, Hopkins presented a Sunday morning talk show on LBC, a London-based national talk and phone-in radio station. She had previously worked as a guest presenter for the station. "The snarling facade remained", wrote Fiona Sturges for The Independent in April 2015 after one such broadcast, "but even Hopkins knows when to tone down the panto villain act". LBC announced Hopkins's departure on 26 May 2017, 'effective immediately', following her comments on Twitter after the Manchester Arena bombing, in which Hopkins said "we need a final solution". Speaking about her departure a few days later on Fox News, she said a deal had been made with LBC not to speak about it, but suggested it was part of a "silencing" of people with right-wing views.

At a Church and Media conference in October 2015, Hopkins said she was "pushing back the walls closing in on freedom of speech". Describing herself as "Jesus of the outspoken" during her speech, she said: "I have never apologised for anything I've said. I find it very disappointing when people apologise. You should have the positive moral attitude to stand by what you say".

Since appearing on The Apprentice, Hopkins has frequently featured in the media for making controversial remarks, being described in The Guardian, HuffPost, and MTV as a "professional troll". She has described herself as a "conduit for truth", declaring "what other people think but are too scared to say"'.

In 2019, Hopkins presented the documentary Homelands about Islam in Europe.

=== Print and online presence ===
Early in her public career, Hopkins wrote a column for Exeter's Express & Echo newspaper, but her articles ceased after an online poll in October 2007 found 84 per cent of readers wanted the feature to end.

At the end of October 2013, it emerged that Hopkins had joined The Sun as a weekly columnist, with the newspaper promoting her as "Britain's most controversial columnist". In February 2015 Hopkins defended her remarks and those of her critics, commenting: "I welcome it because I've had my opinion and it's only right that people have theirs. I welcome the debate and the fact that people are getting involved."

In autumn 2015, she left The Sun for the Mail Online website, the online companion to the Daily Mail. The Daily Telegraph contributor Bryony Gordon wrote in April 2015 that media organisations have "a tipping point here, where the marketing men and women don't want to be associated with reality TV's very own Adolf Hitler. But so far that doesn't seem to have happened." The Mail published a front-page article in June 2017 expressing its low opinion of the liberal The Guardian newspaper, which had criticised it for its coverage of the attack on the Finsbury Park mosque and also referred to Hopkins. It "was a lie" to say Hopkins wrote for the Daily Mail, it asserted. "The Guardian and its writer know that Ms Hopkins has nothing to do with the Daily Mail, but works for Mail Online – a totally separate entity". The Daily Mail newspaper and Mail Online are part of the same group. Her last column for the Mail website was published on 5 October 2017. In a late November 2017 statement from her employers to the Press Gazette, it emerged that Hopkins's Mail contract had not been renewed "by mutual consent". A large number of Tweets from her Twitter account were deleted around the same time.

A few days before, a video was posted online of Hopkins's appearance at the David Horowitz Freedom Center in Florida earlier in November 2017. "It's such a pleasure to be amongst people that are prepared to fight for their country" she said, asserting it is "our time". She continued: "We can commit to arm ourselves, not just with the help of the NRA". In her opinion, there is a "Muslim mafia" in certain areas of Britain and "institutionalised discrimination against whites" in the UK as a whole.

In January 2018, Hopkins joined The Rebel Media, a Canadian far-right website which Tommy Robinson, founder of the far-right English Defence League has also contributed to. In her first column on her own Hopkins World outlet, she wrote: "When so many platforms are under the control of the Saudis, tied to fickle commercial advertisers or beholden to special interests and religious lobbyists, it is a real thrill to find a place for us to speak without censorship". Hopkins no longer writes for Rebel Media and it appears that she was quietly dropped as a contributor around October 2018.

In June 2020, Hopkins was permanently suspended from social networking site Twitter for what a company spokesperson said were "violations of our hateful conduct policy" – having previously been suspended for one week in January 2020. Hopkins subsequently stated that she had joined the social networking site Parler as an alternative. After the announcement a fake account was accidentally verified as hers, and was then used to scam users.

In 2020, Hopkins was the subject of a prank by Youtuber Josh Pieters. She flew to Prague to accept a fake award, the Campaign to Unify the Nation Trophy (C.U.N.T.).

On 5 November 2023, Hopkins' Twitter account was reinstated.

== Views and statements ==
Since appearing on The Apprentice, Hopkins has frequently featured in the media for making controversial remarks, being described in The Guardian, HuffPost, and MTV as a "professional troll". She has described herself as a "conduit for truth", declaring "what other people think but are too scared to say"'.

=== Islam ===
Hopkins is critical of Islam. After the 2016 Nice truck attack, Hopkins stated "Islam disgusts me", declaring the statement was "entirely rational" and not Islamophobic. She is in favour of a burqa ban and has labelled Islamic culture as homophobic. In March 2017, Hopkins gave a speech at a David Horowitz Freedom Center event in which she criticised Muslims, stating that a "Muslim mafia" controlled areas of Britain, and describing London Mayor Sadiq Khan as the "Muslim mayor of Londonistan". Calling on people to "fight for your country" against Muslims, Hopkins stated that "we can commit to arm ourselves, not just with the help of the NRA," adding "get furious and fight back". Hopkins has also worked with the anti-Muslim Center for Security Policy, and has been described as a counter-jihadist.

When asked by BBC's Daily Politics presenter Andrew Neil in a December 2015 interview to name the "swathes" of Britain that are no-go areas for non-Muslims, Hopkins replied that she couldn't for "legal reasons". When Neil said there could be no legal problems with identifying an area she continued to refuse, saying: "I know those places exist".

=== Multiculturalism ===
Hopkins is against multiculturalism. Referencing a "multicultural mafia", she has said that increased crime is directly linked to it. Criticising the Notting Hill Carnival in 2016, she said: "I don't buy multiculturalism at all", stating that a "London bubble" believed in it and "the liberal left wing press, the BBC, they love it! They can't get enough of it." Following the 2017 London Bridge attack, Hopkins criticised "Liberals in London", saying they "actually think multiculturalism means we all die together", and that they were "so desperately wedded to the multicultural illusion that [they] can only fight those who love the country the most, blame those who are most proud to be British."

=== White genocide ===
Hopkins has promoted the white genocide conspiracy theory. She has contended that immigration and multiculturalism are intended to make white people minorities. In February 2018, Yahoo News reported that "her intention was to 'expose' the white genocide" happening to farmers in South Africa. She also visited South Africa to report on anti-white racism.

=== Feminism ===
On the television show Question Time, Hopkins said of feminism: "Women don't want equal treatment, they couldn't handle it if they got it. It's a tough world out there. What a lot of women are actually looking for is special treatment. What women need to realise is that they have to toughen up."

=== Tattoos ===
Hopkins has expressed her views on tattoos on television shows including The Nolan Show and If Katie Hopkins Ruled the World. She has stated: "I really think if you have a tattoo you have to wonder about what kind of future you have ahead of you. As an employer, I wouldn't employ someone with tattoos as I would wonder what customers would think about them. For me, tattoos are just a way for people to find attention who haven't found another way in their life to achieve it by conventional means."

=== Social class ===
During an appearance on ITV's This Morning in July 2013, Hopkins said she would stop her children playing with their classmates based on their given names. She expressed a particular dislike for "lower class" names like Charmaine, Chantelle, and Chardonnay, which met with disapproval from co-host Holly Willoughby. Hopkins said that she did not like "geographical location names" either. After Willoughby's colleague, Phillip Schofield, said that she had given the name India to one of her daughters, Hopkins said that India is "not related to a place". A viewers' poll conducted by the This Morning programme indicated that 91 per cent of respondents disagreed with Hopkins's opinion.

Appearing as a panellist on Channel 5's The Big Benefits Row: Live in February 2014, she was accused by Terry Christian and others of only expressing her controversial opinions to make money from media appearances. Hopkins has said that financial motives are not the reason she speaks out, and received a "relatively modest" fee of £300 when she was on This Morning speaking about children's names.

In a February 2014 interview with Decca Aitkenhead for The Guardian, Hopkins was asked if she is a snob: "Oh, definitely yeah, 100%. I think it's really important to be snobby".

=== Illness and fatalities in the UK ===
Hopkins posted a tweet referring to Scottish life expectancy predictions based upon a 2011 NHS Scotland report, "Healthy Life Expectancy in Scotland: Update of trends to 2010". This tweet was posted following a heated debate on Scottish Independence during an edition of The Wright Stuff on which Hopkins was a panellist. In the wake of the 2013 Glasgow helicopter crash, the tweet was widely criticised by Twitter users. Hopkins said: "Following Independence I will only be the Biggest Bitch in England", and described people's reactions as "PC tastic". An online petition to ban Hopkins from shows such as ITV's This Morning and The Wright Stuff on Channel 5 gained over 75,000 signatures. Hopkins issued an apology the following Monday, restating that her original remark was in reference to the NHS report and was simply bad timing. ITV said on 5 December 2013 that "We have no plans for Katie Hopkins to appear on This Morning at this present time".

On 31 December 2014, police announced they were investigating complaints they had received concerning Hopkins's tweets about Pauline Cafferkey, a Scottish aid worker who was diagnosed with Ebola after returning to the UK from Sierra Leone. Hopkins had tweeted: "Little sweaty jocks, sending us Ebola bombs in the form of sweaty Glaswegians just isn't cricket. Scottish NHS sucks." No evidence of criminality was found by the police. On 7 April 2015, Hopkins made a series of tweets suggesting that people with dementia are "bed blockers" who take up scarce hospital beds and implied they would be better off dead. Her comments were condemned by leading British Alzheimer's charities.

After five Londoners drowned at Camber Sands in August 2016, Hopkins tweeted a poll mocking the identities of the deceased. Sussex Police reported the tweet to Twitter under the headings of "abusive or harmful" and "disrespectful or offensive". They decided while the tweet was distasteful it was not criminal. The tweet was deleted.

=== Obesity ===
Hopkins has been accused by some journalists of fat-shaming. When appearing on ITV's This Morning, Hopkins expressed her views on obesity stating: "Would I employ you if you were obese? No I would not. You would give the wrong impression to the clients of my business. I need people to look energetic, professional and efficient. If you are obese, you look lazy", and "To call yourself 'plus size' is just a euphemism for being fat. Life is much easier when you're thinner. Big is not beautiful, of course a job comes down to how you look."

In 2014, Hopkins took part in a TLC two-part documentary, Katie Hopkins: Fat and Back, where she gained and lost nearly 50 pounds (22 kilograms) of weight. Initially, she ridiculed an overweight woman for being 'a wreck of a human being'. When the TLC show aired in January 2015, Hopkins acknowledged that losing excess weight "actually turned out to be a real ordeal...now I know how hard it is to be fat and carry that weight around and I know no one wants to be fat by choice," she said.

=== Pakistani men and Rochdale ===
Hopkins objected to Rochdale commemorating National Pakistan Day on 23 March 2015 and said that she based her objection on a Rochdale sex trafficking case involving nine predominantly Pakistani men. In a series of tweets, she posted images of the felons with the caption "are these your friends too?" On 29 March 2015, Hopkins was reported to the police by Labour MP Simon Danczuk for possible race hate crimes. In response, Hopkins said: "I asked fair questions and I think it's important that someone has the balls to speak out".

=== Migrants ===
On 17 April 2015, Hopkins wrote a column in The Sun comparing migrants to "cockroaches" and "feral humans" and said they were "spreading like the norovirus". She wrote that gunships should be used to stop migrants from crossing the Mediterranean. Her remarks were condemned by the United Nations High Commissioner for Human Rights, Prince Zeid Ra'ad Al Hussein. In a statement released on 24 April 2015, he urged the UK to "curb incitement to hatred" by its "tabloid newspapers". He stated that Hopkins used "language very similar to that employed by Rwanda's Kangura newspaper and Radio Mille Collines during the run up to the 1994 genocide", and said that both media organisations were subsequently convicted by an international tribunal of incitement to genocide.

Hopkins's column also drew criticism on Twitter, including from Russell Brand, to whom Hopkins responded by accusing Brand's "champagne socialist humanity" of neglecting taxpayers. Simon Usborne, writing in The Independent, compared her use of the word "cockroach" to previous uses by the Nazis and just before the Rwandan genocide by its perpetrators. He suspected that if any other contributor had written the piece, it would not have been published, and questioned her continued employment by the newspaper. Zoe Williams commented in The Guardian: "It is no joke when people start talking like this. We are not 'giving her what she wants' when we make manifest our disgust. It is not a free speech issue. I'm not saying gag her: I'm saying fight her".

In 2015 a Change.org petition was initiated with the aim of getting The Sun to sack Hopkins. By 26 April, it had attracted over 310,000 signatures. In early September, The Sun retweeted an earlier comment from Hopkins expressing her disinterest in migrants. The tweet was pulled after the Prime Minister David Cameron publicly announced Britain would do more to help those seeking asylum in the UK. A further Change.org petition for Hopkins to be replaced with 50,000 Syrian refugees gained more than 20,000 signatures in less than 48 hours in September 2015.

In November 2015, Peter Herbert, chair of the Society of Black Lawyers, reported Hopkins and The Sun to Sir Bernard Hogan-Howe, the Metropolitan Police Commissioner. Hopkins was questioned and not charged, and subsequently criticised the police for purportedly criminalising opinion, and stated that she would set up a Society of White Lawyers. By December 2016, the original article had been removed from The Sun's website.

=== Romani people ===
On 21 May 2014, Hopkins tweeted "Gypsies are not travellers. Travellers are people that commute to work or go on holiday. Gypsies are ferrel [sic] humans – we have no duty to them". Jenn Selby, a writer for The Independent, described her comment as "incredibly racist".

=== Donald Trump ===
In 2015, Hopkins supported Donald Trump's Republican presidential nomination. She told the BBC's This Week that she loved his "bombastic rhetoric, charisma and populist appeal". Hopkins defended Trump when he expressed the view that parts of London were "so radicalised the police are afraid for their lives", an assertion strongly denied by London's mayor and police. Trump thanked Hopkins for her support and for her "powerful writing on the U.K.'s Muslim problems", calling her a "respected journalist".

=== Racism, racial profiling, and Black Lives Matter ===
In January 2017, a caller to her LBC programme named Joseph said she came over as racist, following which she said: "I genuinely believe 'racist' as a word has been used so much. I am sorry for the word racist in a way. I love language so much ... it's like a regular word now, it's lost all meaning to me". When tweeting the clip she added, "Call me racist. I don't care. I will stand up for white women being raped because you're scared to offend Muslims". Hopkins tweeted shortly afterwards: "Racial profiling is a good thing, call me racist. I don't care... it has lost all meaning". She later briefly retweeted a favourable response from an account named Anti Juden SS, whose avatar featured the Swastika (and the United States flag), later stating that she had not looked at the handle.

Sharing a poster on Twitter for the Netflix series Dear White People at the beginning of May 2017, Hopkins added: "Dear black people. If your lives matter why do you stab and shoot each other so much". Although the tweet was deleted, users of the social media site circulated screenshots of what appeared to be a reference to the Black Lives Matter movement in the United States. In August 2016 she urged the London Mayor Sadiq Khan to use water cannon against Black Lives Matter protesters at Heathrow Airport, who had chained themselves to the tarmac of an approach road.

In February 2018, Hopkins was detained and had her passport briefly confiscated in South Africa for allegedly spreading racial hatred.

=== Manchester Arena bombing ===
On the morning following the 2017 Manchester Arena bombing at an Ariana Grande concert, Hopkins tweeted about the need for a "final solution", the Nazis' term for the Holocaust:

22 dead - number rising. Schofield. Don't you even dare. Do not be part of the problem. We need a final solution. #Machester [sic]

The tweet was soon deleted and reworded as a "true solution". Hopkins said the original was a typographical error (she had also misspelled "Manchester"). The motive for the attack, and the background of the suicide bomber, was unknown at the time Hopkins made the comment.

The journalist Nick Cohen was among those who responded on Twitter: "Even if Hopkins knows nothing of Nazism – which I doubt – her "final solution" can only mean ethnic cleansing". Others, such as Owen Jones, called for a boycott of the LBC radio station while they employ her. Interviewed later on Fox News by Tucker Carlson, she called for people to insist on deportations among other responses to terrorist acts. She said: "I used the word 'final solution' in a tweet, and I would not in any way want to use that term and the inference other people lay on that. What I meant was, we need a lasting solution, a resolution to this". The incident led to Hopkins leaving LBC.

Following the June 2017 London Bridge attack almost a fortnight later, Hopkins called for internment camps to be used for those suspected of being Muslim extremists on Fox News' Fox & Friends. The host Clayton Morris said, on behalf of the network staff, that everyone considered the "idea reprehensible".

=== Refugees and migrants in the Mediterranean ===
In July 2017, Hopkins flew to Catania in Sicily to visit a ship known as the C-Star hired by the Defend Europe movement, which has the intention of hindering the work of "search and rescue" vessels in the Mediterranean used by charities such as Save the Children to save trafficked migrants and refugees. Defend Europe is supported by the American white-nationalist David Duke and the neo-Nazi Daily Stormer website.

Hopkins tweeted: "Looking forward to meeting the crew of the C-Star in Catania tomorrow. Setting out to defend the Med. All this week @MailOnline". She tweeted, and then deleted, an image of herself with a Defend Europe activist also present in Sicily at the time, a man known as Peter Sweden, initially reported to be an active Holocaust denier.

An article headlined "Katie Hopkins on NGOs colluding with traffickers in Sicily" was briefly published on the MailOnline website in mid-July 2017. According to a report on HuffPost website, the article offered no evidence to match the title. Shortly after her article was deleted, Save the Children rejected Hopkins' claim that she had "spent time" with the crew of one of their ships. "Nor will she set sail with us on any of our rescue missions", they stated. The deleted MailOnline article was her only contribution to the planned series.

Hopkins' opinions on Mediterranean migrants resurfaced in 2018 after the Pittsburgh synagogue shooting. Hopkins suggested that Chief Rabbi of the UK's "support for mass migration across the Med" explained the shooting. She later deleted the tweet.

=== Climate change ===
Ankita Kulkarni of Logically commented that Hopkins "has often negated the effects of climate change or resorted to fearmongering regarding measures aimed to reduce carbon emissions".

== Legal issues ==
=== Jack Monroe ===
Cookery writer and anti-poverty campaigner Jack Monroe threatened a libel action against Katie Hopkins after Hopkins accused Monroe of vandalising a war memorial, having confused Monroe with journalist Laurie Penny, who had written in support of that vandalism. Monroe called for an apology and a £5,000 donation to a migrants rescue charity. Hopkins later admitted that she was mistaken about the identity but did not apologise. Monroe began legal action in January 2016, and was awarded £24,000 in damages and £107,000 in legal costs in March 2017. After the decision became known, Hopkins tweeted an image of herself as the Virgin Mary and commented that she saw herself as "the Jesus of the outspoken". An appeal application was refused in January 2018 as it was considered unlikely to succeed. Hopkins applied for an insolvency agreement to avoid bankruptcy and sold her family home to pay the legal costs. Social media users ironically pointed to a tweet Hopkins published in 2014 which said "The only thing people in debt have in common other than bad money management, is an ability to blame anyone but themselves.".

=== Mahmood family ===
Mohammad Tariq Mahmood, his brother and their children were stopped from boarding a Norwegian Air flight from Gatwick to Los Angeles on 15 December 2015. At the airport, the family from Walthamstow found their entry visas to the United States had been cancelled.

In December 2016, the Daily Mail and General Trust settled a libel case brought by the Mahmood family with £150,000 damages, plus legal costs, over two articles by Hopkins posted on the MailOnline website which claimed members of the Muslim family were extremists. The columns published at the time of the incident falsely claimed that officials were right to stop the family flying to Los Angeles to visit Disneyland because the two men were connected to al-Qaida, and that their stated plans were a "lie". In the settlement, the assertions from the Mahmood family were accepted as true by the Mail and Hopkins; the family had arranged to stay with another brother living in California, The family's MP, Stella Creasy, complained to the prime minister David Cameron at the time about the family's treatment. Hopkins said Creasy was a "whinging...blond-bobbed maniac".

In a statement from the family's solicitors, Carter-Ruck, they said: "matters are not helped when sensationalist and, frankly, Islamophobic articles such as this are published, and which caused us all a great deal of distress and anxiety. We are very pleased that the record has been set straight". The two articles by Hopkins about the Mahmood family have been removed from the MailOnline website.

=== Jackie Teale ===
In November 2017, Hopkins' former employers Mail Online apologised and paid "substantial damages" to teacher Jackie Teale, after Hopkins falsely accused Teale of taking her class to a Donald Trump protest in Westminster.

=== Daily Mirror ===
In May 2018, Hopkins won an IPSO case against the Daily Mirror for claiming that she had been detained in South Africa in February 2018 for taking ketamine. The Mirror updated the headline to say that she had been detained for spreading racial hatred, and included a correction in the article.

=== Finsbury Park Mosque ===
In October 2020, Hopkins issued an apology after she was sued by Finsbury Park Mosque for inaccurately linking it to a violent incident in May 2020.

=== Deportation from Australia ===
Hopkins was selected as a cast member of the Australian Big Brother VIP series in 2021. She was sacked on 18 July 2021 while in hotel quarantine in Sydney after posting on social media that she had deliberately breached COVID-19 health regulations. At the time of her sacking the Australian Government was investigating whether she had violated the conditions of her visa, and both senior ministers and the federal opposition were calling for her to be deported. The opposition was also critical of the government's decision to grant Hopkins a visa. On 19 July, Hopkins was fined $A1,000 for not wearing a mask while in hotel quarantine. Her visa was also cancelled during the day, and she was deported from the country.

== Political activities ==
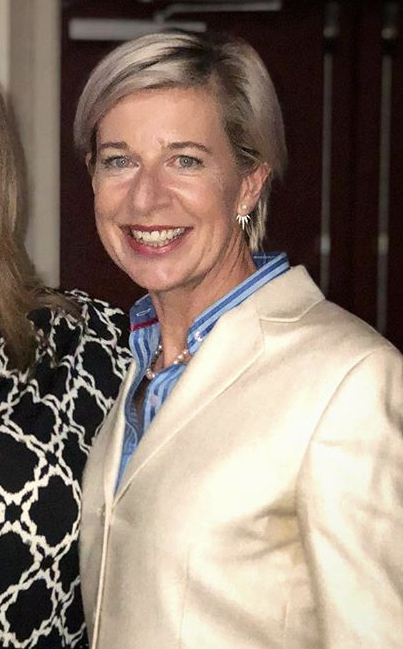
Hopkins in 2018

In the 2009 European Parliament Election, Hopkins stood as an independent candidate for the South West England Constituency. She polled 8,971 votes or 0.6% of the total votes cast.

In September 2015, Hopkins spoke at an event organised by the Electoral Reform Society at the UK Independence Party (UKIP)'s annual conference. After derogatory comments about the appointment of Michelle Mone to the House of Lords, she said: "Frankly, I don't really mind if we seal up the room and gas the lot of them".

UKIP said in 2015 that Hopkins was not a party member and, although she has reportedly applied to join on several occasions, her applications had always been rejected.

In November 2015, students at Brunel University turned their backs on her, then walked out in protest at her presence in a debate.

In January 2021, Hopkins successfully joined UKIP. Explaining her intentions to join the party, she said "People always ask me ... when am I going to do something smarter than just gob off on social media?"

== Personal life ==
Hopkins' first husband was Damian McKinney, a former Royal Marine and founder and chief executive of the company McKinney Rogers; they married in September 2004 in Exeter. He was married to another woman when they first met; she has admitted to having "stolen" him. McKinney left Hopkins for another woman soon after the birth of the couple's second daughter. While working at the Met Office, she met Mark Cross, a married design manager. In 2010, her marriage to Cross was filmed as part of the reality game show Four Weddings, which is shown on the satellite and cable channel Sky Living.

Hopkins formerly had epilepsy; she was being hospitalised around once every 10 days in early 2014, she told Decca Aitkenhead. The seizures could occur up to 10 times at night, according to Sathnam Sanghera who interviewed her for The Times in mid-2015. They began in her late teens whenever she fell asleep and did not respond to prescribed drugs, she said in 2017. In a piece for The Sun, published the following August, she announced she was undergoing surgery to help prevent seizures. In mid-November 2015, her condition led her to fall to the ground in the street injuring her face, and an ambulance was called. In February 2016, she underwent surgery in which a portion of her brain was removed to relieve the severity of the condition. Hopkins tweeted a month later that the operation was a success. "I am no longer an epileptic", she tweeted. According to Hopkins, the surgery had led to complications.

Hopkins sold her Exeter home in March 2018 for £930,000. She applied for an individual voluntary arrangement in May 2018 to avoid bankruptcy, after the libel case brought by Jack Monroe.

== Television credits ==
Year	Title	Notes
2007	The Apprentice	Contestant on third series
2007	I'm a Celebrity...Get Me Out of Here!	Contestant on seventh series
2010	Four Weddings	Season 2, Episode 8
2015	Celebrity Big Brother	Contestant on fifteenth series, finished as runner-up
2015	If Katie Hopkins Ruled the World	Chat show
2015	Katie Hopkins: My Fat Story	TLC documentary

=== Guest appearances ===
- 8 Out of 10 Cats (2007) – 1 episode
- The Friday Night Project (2007) – 1 episode
- Weakest Link (2008) – 1 episode
- The Wright Stuff (2008–2015) – 17 episodes
- The Alan Titchmarsh Show (2010) – 1 episode
- Question Time (2010–2011) – 3 episodes
- The One Show (2011) – 1 episode
- Daybreak (2011–2013) – 6 episodes
- 10 O'Clock Live (2013) – 1 episode
- This Morning (2013–2015) – 15 episodes
- Celebrity Juice (2014) – 1 episode
- The Big Benefits Row: Live (2014) – TV special
- Celebrity Big Brother's Bit on the Side (2014–2015) – 6 episodes
- The Late Late Show (2014–2015) – 2 episodes
- Loose Women (2015) – 1 episode
- The Nolan Show (2015) – 1 episode
- Reality Bites (2015) – 1 episode
- Tucker Carlson Tonight (2018) – 4 episodes
- The Bolt Report (2019) – 1 episode
- The Candace Owens Show (2020) – 1 episode
- Outsiders (2020–2021) – 6 episodes

== Bibliography ==
- Rude (2017)
- Help: A Survival Guide For Life (2021)
