= If Katie Hopkins Ruled the World =

2015 British TV series

- Genre: Chat show
- Created by: Sarah Thornton
- Presented by: Katie Hopkins
- Country of origin: United Kingdom
- Original language: English
- No. of series: 1
- No. of episodes: 7

Production
- Running time: 60 minutes

Original release
- Network: TLC
- Release: 6 August – 17 September 2015

If Katie Hopkins Ruled the World was a British television panel show produced by Mentorn Media for TLC, presented by former Apprentice candidate and former newspaper columnist Katie Hopkins.

The first episode was broadcast on 6 August 2015 on TLC. The series ended on 17 September 2015. In December 2015, it was announced that the series would not be re-commissioned for a second series because of low ratings.
