= Daily Kitchen Live =

- No. of series: 1
- No. of episodes: 10

Production
- Production company: Cactus TV

Original release
- Network: BBC One
- Release: 13 April – 24 April 2020

Daily Kitchen Live is a British daytime cookery programme, that premiered on BBC One in April 2020. The programme comes from Cactus TV, who also created Saturday Kitchen, shown on the same channel.

The programme, created in response to the COVID-19 pandemic in the United Kingdom, responds to "lockdown challenges" facing viewers including cooking on a budget or those who have limited food resources. It is hosted by chef Matt Tebbutt, alongside food writer and anti-poverty campaigner Jack Monroe.

The programme aired between 10am and 11am for a two-week period commencing 13 April 2020.
