= McAlpine v Bercow =

2013 libel case

- Court: High Court of Justice of England and Wales, Queen's Bench Division
- Full case name: The Lord McAlpine of West Green Claimant v Sally Bercow
- Decided: 24 May 2013
- Citation: [2013] EWHC 1342 (QB)
- Transcript: Full text of Approved Judgment

Court membership
- Judge sitting: The Hon. Mr Justice Tugendhat

Keywords
- libel; defamation; reasonableness; repetition rule

McAlpine v Bercow was a landmark libel case in 2013 between Conservative peer Lord McAlpine and Sally Bercow, the wife of John Bercow, Speaker of the House of Commons.

== Background ==
Lord McAlpine alleged that he was defamed by comments implying that he was a paedophile published by Sally Bercow on Twitter, a social networking service. This followed the broadcast on 2 November 2012 of a report by BBC Two's Newsnight which linked an unnamed "senior Conservative" politician to sex abuse claims. On 4 November 2012, Bercow tweeted "Why is Lord McAlpine trending? *innocent face*"

When the allegations against McAlpine proved to be unfounded, Bercow was one of a number of people that the peer threatened with legal action. The BBC subsequently apologised and paid £185,000 to McAlpine in damages and the ITV television network paid him £125,000 in damages. McAlpine commenced legal actions against users of Twitter who had repeated the claims but users with fewer than 500 followers were allowed to settle the matter by making a donation of £25 to the BBC Children in Need charity. McAlpine donated the libel damages from BBC and ITV to Children in Need and other charities.

McAlpine's lawyers said that they would continue to pursue 20 "high profile Tweeters" (users with more than 500 followers) including Bercow, comedian Alan Davies and writer George Monbiot. Acting on behalf of McAlpine, solicitor Andrew Reid announced: "Twitter is not just a closed coffee shop among friends. It goes out to hundreds of thousands of people and you must take responsibility for it. It is not a place where you can gossip and say things with impunity, and we are about to demonstrate that."

In November 2012, Monbiot published "Lord McAlpine – An Abject Apology" on his personal website and apologised for acting "in an unprofessional, thoughtless and cruel manner". Monbiot also wrote personally to McAlpine and agreed to undertake charity work. Davies apologised publicly and privately to McAlpine in November 2012. In contrast, Bercow "consistently denied that her tweets were libellous" and in December 2012 she appointed the law firm Carter-Ruck to defend her against the claim. At the time that the tweet was made she had 56,000 followers, described by Sir Edward Garnier QC, for McAlpine, as "a bigger readership than many regional newspapers".

== Judgment ==
At a preliminary hearing held on 16 April 2013 it was decided that the trial should be split into two stages. The first stage would decide if the words of the tweet could be considered defamatory. If this was found to be the case a second hearing would be held to determine the level of damages unless both parties were able to reach an agreement.

The judgment in the first stage was handed down on 24 May 2013. The Hon. Mr Justice Tugendhat was asked to rule on the meaning of Bercow's tweet, particularly the phrase "innocent face" which the judge said was intended to be read "as a stage direction" with readers "imagining that they can see [Bercow's] face as she asks the question in the Tweet. The words direct the reader to imagine that the expression on her face is one of innocence, that is an expression which purports to indicate (sincerely, on the Defendant's case, but insincerely or ironically on the Claimant's case) that she does not know the answer to her question."

The judge said that there were two different kinds of meaning recognised in law: "a natural and ordinary meaning" and "an innuendo meaning". Citing Jones v Skelton, Mr Justice Tugendhat explained that a natural and ordinary meaning may be either the literal meaning or a meaning "that does not require the support of extrinsic facts passing beyond general knowledge". An innuendo meaning, he said, "is a meaning which can be implied from the words complained of, but only if the reader also knows other facts (which are not general knowledge). These are generally called extrinsic facts." The judge decided that any reasonable reader would understand both meanings of Bercow's tweet and interpret the "innocent face" as insincere and ironical: "There is no sensible reason for including those words in the tweet if they are to be taken as meaning that the defendant simply wants to know the answer to a factual question." The judge decided that the Tweet meant "in its natural and ordinary defamatory meaning, that the Claimant was a paedophile who was guilty of sexually abusing boys living in care". With regard to the innuendo of the tweet Mr Justice Tugendhat found that the Tweet carried a meaning "to the same effect" and found that the tweet was "an allegation of guilt. I see no room on these facts for any less serious meaning." As it had already been accepted by Bercow prior to the hearing that McAlpine was innocent of the allegations her tweet was "seriously defamatory" and indefensible in law.

Following judgment both parties reached an agreement and Bercow agreed to pay damages. Bercow was also ordered to apologise in open court to McAlpine, who said that he would travel to London from his home in Italy "to hear it personally".

== Reactions ==
Prior to judgment Bercow made two offers to settle out of court. Both were rejected by McAlpine, leading to Joshua Rozenberg, a lawyer and columnist for London's The Guardian newspaper, to opine "that the undisclosed, agreed damages were higher than she had hoped." McAlpine's solicitor Andrew Reid said: "The apologies previously received from Mrs Bercow did not concede that her tweet was defamatory but clearly she must now accept this fact. Her failure to admit that her tweet was defamatory caused considerable unnecessary pain and suffering to Lord McAlpine and his family over the last six months. The judgment is one of great public interest and provides both a warning to and guidance for people who use social media." Rozenberg noted: "The law of defamation is well known to those who write for a living. One hopes Twitter users are beginning to learn what a powerful and potentially dangerous weapon they have at their fingertips. A tweet is more like a broadcast than an email and is subject to the law of libel in the same way."

Bercow said: "The High Court found that my tweet constituted a serious libel, both in its natural meaning and as an innuendo. To say I am surprised and disappointed by this is an understatement. I will accept the ruling as the end of the matter. I remain sorry for the distress I have caused Lord McAlpine and I repeat my apologies. Today's ruling should be seen as a warning to all social media users."

Patrick Strudwick, also writing in The Guardian, noted that on the day of the hearing many Twitter users tweeted: "Why is Sally Bercow trending? *libel face*", a humorous reference to her defamatory tweet.

The case was subsequently cited in the judgement in the 2017 Monroe v Hopkins libel case.

== See also ==
- English defamation law
