= Food Unwrapped =

- Genre: Consumer
- Based on: Keuringsdienst van Waarde
- Presented by: Matt Tebbutt; Jimmy Doherty; Kate Quilton; Andi Oliver; Briony May Williams; Amanda Byram; Helen Lawal
- Theme music composer: David Yapp
- Country of origin: United Kingdom
- Original language: English
- No. of series: 25
- No. of episodes: 168 (+ 35 specials)

Production
- Executive producers: Sandy Watson; Clair Cadman
- Running time: 30 minutes (inc. adverts); 60 minutes (specials; inc. adverts)
- Production company: Ricochet Ltd

Original release
- Network: Channel 4
- Release: 10 September 2012 – 22 April 2025

Food Unwrapped is a British television series broadcast by Channel 4 featuring Kate Quilton, Jimmy Doherty, Matt Tebbutt, and Andi Oliver (as of 2023). The show is based on the original Dutch series "Keuringsdienst van Waarde", devised by Dahl TV and licensed by Warner Bros. International Television Production Ltd. There have been 25 series and a number of special episodes.

Presented as a consumer show investigating food production, it was broadcast from 10 September 2012 to 22 April 2025.

== Series overview ==
=== Series ===
Series	Episodes	Originally released	
Series	Episodes	First released	Last released
Series 1	8	10 September 2012	5 November 2012
Series 2	8	3 June 2013	29 July 2013
Series 3	6	20 January 2014	3 March 2014
Series 4	6	14 July 2014	18 August 2014
Series 5	13	12 January 2015	25 May 2015
Series 6	16	31 August 2015	14 March 2016
Series 7	4	25 March 2016	15 April 2016
Series 8	5	9 May 2016	6 June 2016
Series 9	8	26 September 2016	25 November 2016
Series 10	5	9 January 2017	6 February 2017
Series 11	6	8 May 2017	26 July 2017
Series 12	4	20 October 2017	12 December 2017
Series 13	9	4 January 2018	29 May 2018
Series 14	8	11 June 2018	27 August 2018
Series 15	12	8 October 2018	4 February 2019
Series 16	6	15 March 2019	6 May 2019
Series 17	10	26 August 2019	9 December 2019
Series 18	5	24 February 2020	23 March 2020
Series 19	7	16 April 2021	7 June 2021
Series 20	3	23 August 2021	6 September 2021
Series 21	3	15 November 2021	29 November 2021
Series 22	2	9 May 2022	16 May 2022
Series 23	5	22 August 2022	17 October 2022
Series 24	5	13 January 2023	10 February 2023
Series 25	4	10 January 2025	31 January 2025

Note: Series 19 was due to premiere on 9 April 2021, but was postponed until 16 April 2021 due to the death of his HRH Prince Philip, Duke of Edinburgh.

=== Specials ===
Special	Airdate
Food Techniques Special	12 August 2013
Viewers' Questions Special	9 December 2013
Christmas Dinner	23 December 2013
Diet Special	6 January 2014
Easter Special	21 April 2014
Christmas Dinner II	22 December 2014
Diet Special II	5 January 2015
Diets For Summer	27 July 2015
Christmas Special	21 December 2015
Diet Special III	4 January 2016
Lose Weight For The Summer	13 June 2016
The Truth About Sugar	19 September 2016
Diet Special IV	2 January 2017
Summer Diet Special	5 June 2017
Christmas Special	12 December 2017
Diet Special V	4 January 2018
Cracking Christmas Guide	18 December 2019
New Year Health Special	7 January 2020
Comfort Foods Special	8 September 2020
Store Cupboard Staples	15 September 2020
Festive Feast	14 December 2020
Healthy New Year	11 January 2021
Food Unwrapped Gets Chocolatey	2 April 2021
Food Unwrapped Does Great Britain	5 April 2021
Food Unwrapped Does Takeaways	7 May 2021
Healthy Hacks	16 August 2021
Christmas Cracker	6 December 2021
Healthy New Year	3 January 2022
Food Unwrapped Goes Veggie	10 January 2022
Supermarket Secrets	2 May 2022
Food Unwrapped Gets Baking	23 May 2022
Food Unwrapped's Sweet Treat	20 June 2022
Food Unwrapped's Breakfast Buffet	27 June 2022
Food Unwrapped's Italian Adventures	4 July 2022
Food Unwrapped: Jimmy's Asian Adventures	11 July 2022
Food Unwrapped's Sweet Feast	18 July 2022
Food Unwrapped’s Nordic Adventure	1 December 2022
Food Unwrapped's New Year Health Kicks	6 January 2023
Food Unwrapped Gets Fruity	28 February 2023
Food Unwrapped's Veg Box	7 March 2023
Food Unwrapped's Lunch Box	14 March 2023
Supermarkets Unwrapped: The Freezer Aisle	3 July 2023
Supermarkets Unwrapped: The Vegan Aisle	10 July 2023
Supermarkets Unwrapped: Fruit & Veg Aisle	17 July 2023
Supermarkets Unwrapped: The Snacks Aisle	24 July 2023
Food Unwrapped's Caribbean Adventure	2 January 2024
Food Unwrapped's Deep South Adventure	9 January 2024
Food Unwrapped's South Korean Adventure	16 January 2024
Food Unwrapped's Great British Grub	22 April 2025
