= Decca Aitkenhead =

English journalist

- Born: Jessica Aitkenhead; 1971 (age 54–55); Wiltshire, England
- Education: University of Manchester; City, University of London
- Awards: Russell Prize (2020)
- Website: Decca Aitkenhead on X

Jessica "Decca" Aitkenhead (born 1971) is an English journalist, writer and broadcaster.

== Early life and education ==
Aitkenhead's family lived in Wiltshire when she was born; she has three older brothers. Her father was a teacher in Bristol before becoming a builder after the family moved to the country. Her mother was diagnosed with terminal breast cancer and died when Aitkenhead was nine. Many years later, Aitkenhead discovered that her mother had killed herself.

Aitkenhead studied politics and modern history at the University of Manchester, where she worked for the Manchester Evening News as a columnist and feature writer. After moving to London, she completed a Diploma in Newspaper Journalism at City, University of London in 1995 before beginning her career in the national press.

== Career ==
Aitkenhead wrote for The Independent from 1995 before joining The Guardian in 1997, but left the paper in 1999 to write her first book. During this period she lived in Jamaica for a year with her then husband, Reuters photographer Paul Hackett.

Her book The Promised Land: Travels in search of the perfect E was published in 2002. While the drug ecstasy was promoted as a way to make oneself happy in her travelogue, the book was described by Dave Haslam in a London Review of Books article as, "In many ways" not "a great advertisement for drug-taking" as her experiences are largely "joyless" and not transformative. Ian Penman in his Guardian review thought the work "tentative" while Geraldine Bedell in The Observer described it as an "intelligent and absorbing book". During a period as a freelance, she wrote for the Mail on Sunday, London Evening Standard, and The Sunday Telegraph, before rejoining The Guardian in 2004. She was subsequently appointed Chief Interviewer at The Sunday Times.

Aitkenhead contributed interviews for the newspaper's G2 section. In 2009 she won Interviewer of the Year at the British Press Awards. She had "particularly impressed the judges with her remarkable encounter in August with Chancellor Alistair Darling". She is also a contributor to radio and television programmes.

== Personal life ==
In May 2014, Aitkenhead's partner, Kids Company charity worker Tony Wilkinson, drowned in Jamaica while attempting to rescue one of the couple's two sons, who survived. The couple had been together for a decade. Aitkenhead has written about their relationship and the process of mourning in her memoir All at Sea. Just over a year after Wilkinson died, Aitkenhead discovered she was suffering from an aggressive form of breast cancer with a genetic link. After medical treatment, including chemotherapy, her cancer is in remission.

== Awards and honours ==
Aitkenhead was the winner of the BBC's 2020 Russell Prize for best writing for her article How a Jamaican Psychedelic Mushroom Retreat Helped Me Process My Grief, published in The Times.

== Publications ==
- The Promised Land: Travels in search of the perfect E (2002)
- All at Sea (2016)
