= Jimmy's Farm =

Coordinates: 52.01964°N 1.12476°E

- Starring: Jimmy Doherty; Michaela Furney
- Country of origin: United Kingdom

Production
- Running time: 60 minutes

Original release
- Network: BBC 2
- Release: 2004 – 2006

Jimmy's Farm is a British television series set in a working rare-breed farm, tourist destination and wedding venue in Wherstead, Suffolk. The series is produced Fresh One Productions and first broadcast on BBC in 2004. Jimmy Doherty set up the Essex Pig Company, a rare breeds piggery on the outskirts of Ipswich in Suffolk. The drama revolved around Jimmy's previous lack of hands-on experience of farming, the financial struggles involved in starting a small business, and Jimmy's relationships with employees, friends and his then-girlfriend, Michaela Furney. Doherty was a childhood friend of celebrity chef Jamie Oliver, who gave him a loan to help get the farm started, and appeared in one episode of the series. The series was followed up with a one-off special, Back on Jimmy's Farm, and a second series, Return to Jimmy's Farm.

A new series called Crisis on Jimmy's Farm aired on BBC in 2007, featuring developments on the farm including the opening of Guinea Pig village, the making of Ferret Folly as well as the struggles of ensuring the extension of the lease and problems with Christmas hamper orders.

The first series of Jimmy's Farm was released on DVD in the UK by Revelation Films in March 2010.
