= Jack Monroe =

British food writer and activist

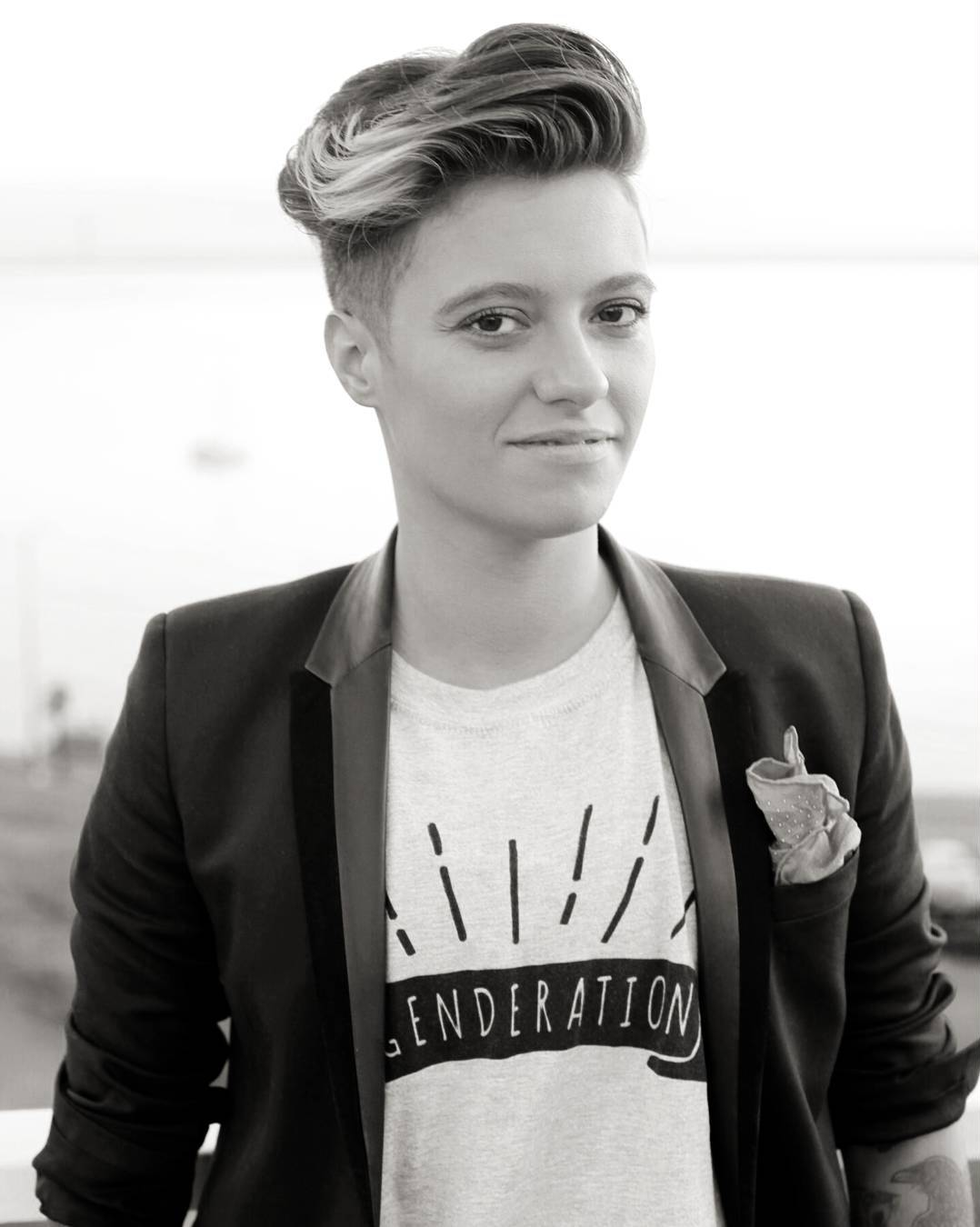
- Monroe in 2015
- Born: 17 March 1988 (age 38); Southend-on-Sea, England
- Education: Westcliff High School for Girls
- Occupations: Writer, journalist, campaigner
- Years active: 2012–2023
- Known for: Blogger, cookbook author
- Children: 1

Jack Monroe (born 17 March 1988) is a British food writer, journalist and activist known for campaigning on poverty issues, particularly hunger relief. She (Note: Monroe uses she/her and they/them pronouns. This article uses she/her for consistency.) initially rose to prominence when a post on her blog A Girl Called Jack (later renamed Cooking on a Bootstrap) went viral. She has published seven cookbooks that focus on "austerity recipes" and meals which can be made on a tight budget. She has written for publications such as The Echo, The Huffington Post and The Guardian.

== Early life ==
Monroe was born in Southend-on-Sea in 1988 to David and Evelyn Hadjicostas (née Beatty), a former nurse. Her father is of Greek-Cypriot heritage; he served in the British Army for seven years, then with the fire service for 30 years. He was appointed MBE in 2007 Birthday Honours for services to children and families. Monroe has three siblings. Monroe was diagnosed with autism and ADHD as a child, though was not made aware of this until she was an adult. Monroe has described herself variously as working class and as middle class. She came out as gay aged 15.

=== Education ===
Monroe passed the 11-plus examinations and attended Westcliff High School for Girls, a grammar school in Westcliff-on-Sea. She left school at age 16, "bullied and disillusioned", with insufficient GCSEs (she sat 7 and passed 4 and a half of them) to progress to A Level. Despite her future career, Monroe said in 2022 that she only achieved a low D grade in her home economics GCSE.

== Career ==
=== Early work ===
Monroe worked in various jobs, including in a chip shop and then Starbucks. In 2007 she took a job as a call handler for Essex County Fire and Rescue Service. After having a child, she was unable to arrange the work around childcare responsibilities, and was unable to negotiate adjustments to her working pattern to make continued employment feasible. Monroe resigned the post in November 2011.

=== Blogging ===
Monroe came to prominence in July 2012 when the "Hunger Hurts" post on her blog A Girl Called Jack went viral on social media. The post detailed her experience of poverty, relying on benefits and struggling to feed herself and her child from a £10 weekly food budget. The blog was originally intended for posts about local politics, but evolved to offer cheap recipes suitable for people on a low budget. In December 2015, the blog was renamed as Cooking on a Bootstrap.

=== Newspapers ===
In November 2012, Monroe became a weekly columnist for The Echo, a south Essex daily newspaper. In February 2013, she was taken on by the paper as a trainee reporter. She was later retained as an unpaid columnist for The Huffington Post. In July 2013 Monroe started writing a twice-monthly food and recipe column for The Guardian. This included cheap recipes aiming to provide family meals for less than £10 per week. She also contributed a number of political columns.

=== Books ===
Monroe has written seven budget cooking recipe books. In May 2013 she signed her first publishing deal with Penguin Group, reported to be worth £25,000. A Girl Called Jack was published in February 2014 and a second book A Year in 120 Recipes was published in October 2014.

The third book Cooking on a Bootstrap was initially self-published. In December 2015 Monroe set up a crowdfunder on Kickstarter with a target of £8,000. Within 24 hours the target was met and £23,000 had been raised. The total raised was over £60,000. In February 2016 it was announced that a further edition of the book would be published by Bluebird. It was released in August 2018.

According to BookScan data, by October 2018 Monroe had sold 90,515 copies of her books with A Girl Called Jack her best selling work to date at 67,842 copies sold.

The fourth book Tin Can Cook was published by Bluebird in May 2019. Monroe raised over £30,000 through a fundraiser on the website GoFundMe in order to send 7,000 copies of the book to food banks.

A deal with Bluebird for two further books was announced in June 2019. Vegan (ish) was released in December 2019. Good Food for Bad Days was released in May 2020.

A seventh book Thrifty Kitchen of money-saving recipes and home hacks was announced in October 2022 for release in January 2023. The publisher Bluebird put out a statement shortly after release warning that some of the hacks could be dangerous. These included: using a sharp knife and hammer to open tin cans without an opener, freezing glass bottles filled with water to use as a rolling pin, using empty tuna tins as egg rings and straining hot liquids via a piece of cotton held up with carabiners on a hook.

=== Television ===
In 2013, Monroe appeared in a six-week advertising campaign for Sainsbury's supermarket. Writing in The Guardian in 2013 Monroe said she had accepted the equivalent of the living wage for the six weeks that the campaign ran and donated the remainder of the fee to charities including a food bank. Monroe appeared on BBC television's late night political programme This Week in June 2015 and again in May 2019.

In April 2020, it was announced that Monroe would co-host Daily Kitchen Live on BBC One alongside Matt Tebbutt. The programme, made in response to issues stemming from the COVID-19 pandemic, offered tips and guidance to families struggling with limited resources, and aired daily for a two-week period that commenced on 14 April 2020.

== Campaigning ==
In 2015 Monroe was an ambassador for Child Poverty Action Group. She raised funds for the Live Below the Line campaign. In March 2022, Monroe complained that due to inflation poor people could not afford food, fuel and rent, and were having to go without food or fuel, or were eating unhealthily because they could not afford healthy food. Monroe called for social security benefits to be raised in line with inflation. In May 2022, Monroe criticised Conservative MP Lee Anderson's praise in the House of Commons for a food bank which has a compulsory cooking and budgeting class for those accepting food parcels.

== Politics ==
Monroe appeared in a Labour Party campaign video in October 2013. She left the Labour Party in March 2015, after disagreeing with its rhetoric on immigration, and became a member of the Green Party of England and Wales, also in March 2015. In April 2016, Monroe appeared online supporting the Women's Equality Party. In January 2021, Monroe tweeted that she was a "fully paid up member of the Labour Party and have been for quite some time now".

In the 2017 United Kingdom general election, Monroe intended to stand in Southend West as a candidate for the National Health Action Party, but withdrew after receiving death threats and because of health problems. In May 2017, Monroe participated in a "blind election date" with British television personality Georgia Toffolo in which they discussed politics.

Monroe has voiced her support for Scottish independence. "Scotland deserves better than the scraps that Westminster reluctantly throws every now and then while bleeding your resources dry", she tweeted on 7 July 2022.

== Controversy ==
=== David Cameron's dead son ===
In November 2014, Monroe said on Twitter that then-Prime Minister of the United Kingdom David Cameron "uses stories about his dead son as misty-eyed rhetoric to legitimise selling our NHS to his friends". The Daily Mail journalist Sarah Vine criticised Monroe for using the death of Cameron's severely disabled son for political purposes and "choosing" a life of poverty. Jenn Selby, writing in The Independent, described this as a "caustic attack", and Monroe replied on Twitter that Vine's column was "homophobic, transphobic, deadnaming [and] ignorant".

=== Authenticity ===
Monroe has been described as an "austerity celebrity". In May 2022, Lee Anderson, MP for Ashfield, stated that Monroe was "taking money off some of the most vulnerable people in society and making an absolute fortune [off] the back of people". In response, Monroe indicated that she intended to sue Anderson for libel.

In a January 2023 interview with Simon Hattenstone in The Guardian, Monroe acknowledged that she had recklessly spent money given by backers; she said: "I'd go online absolutely shitfaced and buy nice furniture." Hattenstone wrote: "The guru of thriftiness was chucking away tens of thousands of pounds, given to her by the public to support her work, on items she didn't even want, let alone need", stating that she didn't deny she'd "abused the goodwill of well-meaning backers".

Writing for Pink News in September 2022, Lily Wakefield said that Monroe has "faced accusations of inventing experiences of living in poverty", while in October 2022 Killian Fox said in The Guardian that "critics claim that she makes herself out to be poorer than she actually is". In January 2023, Kathleen Stock (writing for UnHerd) stated that Monroe was "wedded to a narrative of personal struggle and sudden dramatic changes of fortune, for better or worse" with an "inability to keep a story straight about whether she's really a downtrodden victim of a cruel system or rather #winningatlife", which had given rise to "an army of determined internet sleuths" and "a multi-headed hydra of critics on Twitter".

== Awards and honours ==
The University of Essex announced in May 2015 that it would be awarding Monroe an honorary degree.

In 2015, Monroe won the Women of the Future Award in the media category. Monroe was "surprised", saying "I'm not sure I'll even be a woman in the future". The award was won after Monroe came out as non-binary, which created some controversy. Writing in The Guardian in 2015 she said, "Because of my trans identity, I'm attacked for accepting a real woman's award."

== Personal life ==
Monroe began going by the forename Jack, short for "Jack of all trades". She added the surname "Monroe" as a tribute to Marilyn Monroe. Speaking in 2015 she said, "I legally changed my name by deed poll immediately after leaving Essex County Fire and Rescue Service at the end of 2011". In 2014, three years after she legally changed her name, she stated that she still experienced deadnaming by people. She has requested that her birth name not be used by the media.

The 2013 book deal resulted in housing benefit being frozen and Monroe came close to being evicted, which led to moving into cheaper accommodation. Speaking in 2013 she said, "I go out to work every day, but I still can't afford to make ends meet." By January 2014, finances had improved, and Monroe was able to move into a small two-bedroom flat with her son. Speaking in 2014, Monroe described life as having "changed beyond recognition", but said that she is still affected by her experience of poverty.

Monroe came out as non-binary in October 2015, and goes by she/her or they/them pronouns. Writing in the New Statesman in 2015 she said she did not change her name to Jack while still working at the fire service, out of concern over "the potential for deadnaming and bullying in a not-particularly-tolerant organisation. Not a great place to be gay, let alone genderqueer." She did not take part in a fire-service passing out ceremony, because protocol would have required her to wear a skirt. Monroe had previously identified as a cisgender lesbian. In a February 2014 interview, she described herself as a "lefty, liberal, lezzer cook".

In 2017, Monroe said she had developed acute arthritis, citing the condition as a partial cause for her suspending her campaign for candidacy in the National Health Action Party. Her arthritis led her to develop a dependency on the prescription drug tramadol. In January 2019, Monroe wrote a piece in The Guardian that stated she was recovering from alcoholism and discussed how drinking had affected her work and personal life. She attended drug rehabilitation in 2021.

Monroe had a brief relationship with a male friend which resulted in a son. She also had a long-term relationship with a woman which ended shortly after Monroe told her partner she was considering a mastectomy.

In 2014, it was reported that Monroe and her son were living with Monroe's then girlfriend Allegra McEvedy; the relationship ended in June 2015. In January 2019, Monroe announced her engagement to Head of Channel 4 News Louisa Compton but the relationship ended in 2021.

=== Legal actions ===
Monroe said she was taking legal action in 2015 after the Daily Mail said that "Jack" was not her "real" name.

In 2017, Monroe won a libel case against newspaper columnist and television personality Katie Hopkins, after Hopkins suggested on Twitter that Monroe was supportive of vandalism of a war memorial, having confused Monroe with journalist Laurie Penny. Instead of apologising, Hopkins then labelled Monroe "social anthrax". The High Court awarded Monroe £24,000 in damages plus costs.

== Bibliography ==
- A Girl Called Jack: 100 delicious budget recipes (Michael Joseph, 2014) ISBN 9780718178949
- A Year in 120 Recipes (Michael Joseph, 2014) ISBN 9780718179960
- Cooking on a Bootstrap: Over 100 simple, budget recipes (Bluebird, 2018) ISBN 9781509831111
- Tin Can Cook: 75 Simple Store-cupboard Recipes (Bluebird, 2019) ISBN 9781529015287
- Vegan (ish): 100 simple, budget recipes that don't cost the earth (Bluebird, 2019) ISBN 9781529005080
- Good Food for Bad Days: What to Make When You're Feeling Blue (Bluebird, 2020) ISBN 9781529028188
- Thrifty Kitchen (Bluebird, 2023) ISBN 9781035008513

== See also ==
- Poverty in the United Kingdom
- United Kingdom government austerity programme
