= Nishkam SWAT =

UK-based Sikh charity for the homeless

- Sikh Welfare & Awareness Team
- ਨਿਸ਼ਕਾਮ ਸਵਾਤ
- Founded: 2008
- Founder: Randeep Lall
- Headquarters: Southall, London, England
- Services: services for the homeless
- Subsidiaries: None
- Website: nishkamswat.org

Nishkam SWAT (Punjabi: ਨਿਸ਼ਕਾਮ ਸਵਾਤ) is a Sikh charity which supports the homeless within India, Argentina and the United Kingdom.

== Nishkam SWAT's work ==
Nishkam SWAT was launched in 2008 by charity founder Randeep Lall and since then it has grown to provide 4000 meals for the homeless every week.

The homeless charity provides meals in a number of English towns including London, Reading, Oxford, Bristol, and Luton with volunteers including students and members of the interfaith community.

The charity was founded on the principle of Langar started by Guru Nanak and is the first charity to take Langar to the streets.

During the COVID-19 pandemic they have worked with the NHS, Government and medical advisors to continue providing homeless feeding services.

== Awards and recognition ==
- 2018: Awarded 'Outstanding Achievement' at the Observer Food Awards.
- 2019: Awarded the Queen's Award for Voluntary Service.
