= Jimmy Doherty =

British farmer and television presenter (born 1975)

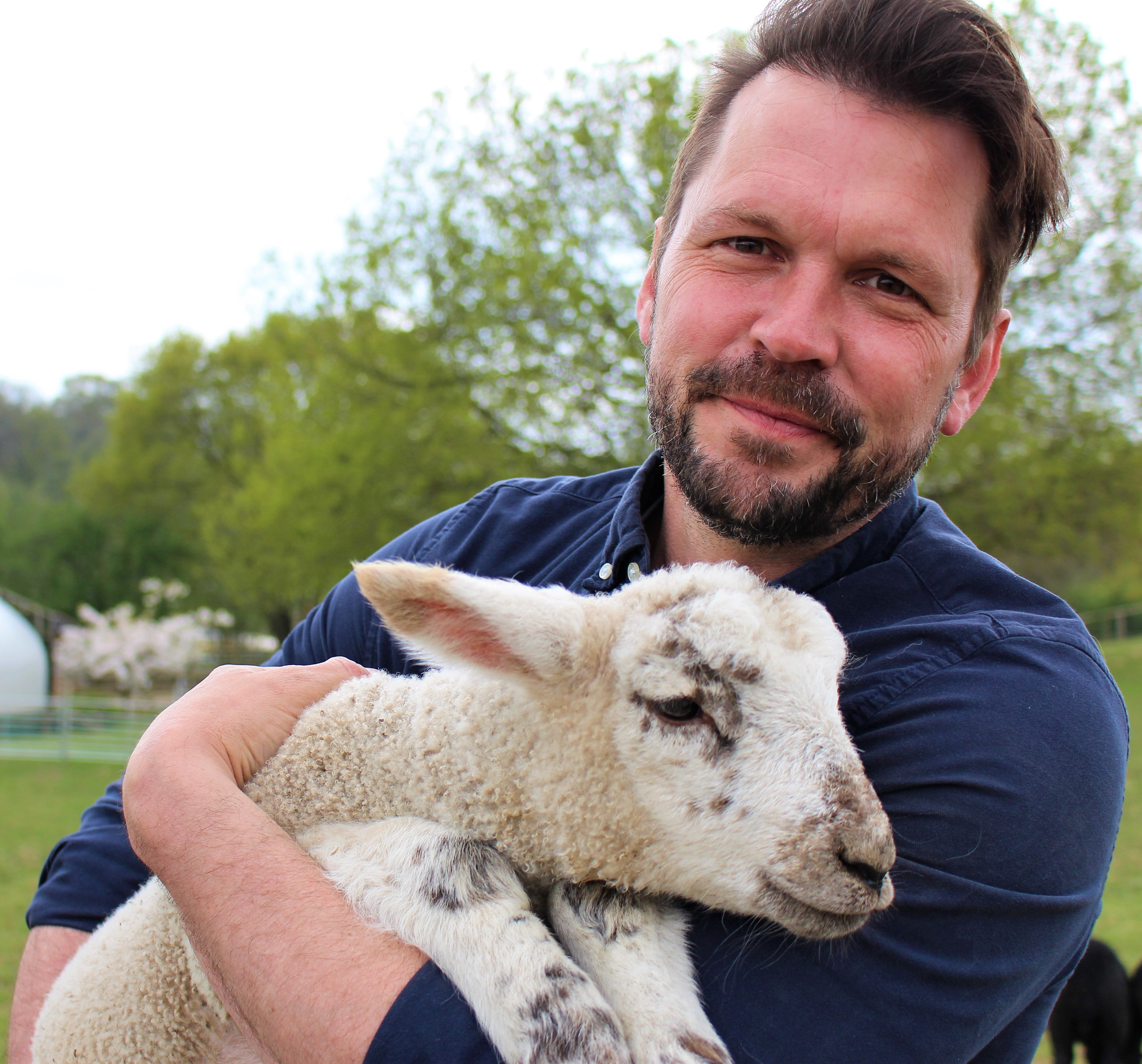
- Born: 24 May 1975 (age 51); Ilford, London, England
- Occupations: Farmer; conservationist; television personality; academic
- Known for: Jimmy's Farm, Jimmy's Food Factory, Jamie & Jimmy's Food Fight Club, Food Unwrapped, Jamie & Jimmy's Friday Night Feast. Builds on Wheels
- Spouse: Michaela Furney (m. 2009)
- Children: 4

Jimmy Doherty (born 24 May 1975) is an English television presenter and farmer. Doherty is known for the show Jimmy's Farm, detailing the operation of the Essex Pig Company that he and his wife Michaela Furney own in Suffolk.

== Early life ==
Born in Ilford, Doherty moved to Clavering in Essex at the age of three. A childhood friend of Jamie Oliver, he attended Clavering Primary School and then studied at Newport Free Grammar School. Whilst at Newport Grammar School Doherty ran a magazine called 'The Natural Choice' sparking his love of nature and animals.

From the age of 13 he worked in the tropical butterfly house at Mole Hall Wildlife Park in Saffron Walden, assisting with the menagerie of different animals ranging from otters to chimpanzees. Doherty left Mole Hall, aged 24, to focus on his academic commitments.

He has a degree in animal biology from the University of East London and studied for a PhD in entomology at Coventry University's zoology department.

== Career ==
Doherty served for five years in the Royal Corps of Signals.

He appeared as a friend and guest on BBC's Oliver's Twist in the episodes "Painting Party" in 2002 "Flash in the Pan" in 2003.

He trained as a pig farmer when, early in 2002, he met Michaela Furney, then a runner for Channel 4's Jamie's Kitchen, when filming took it to the Cumbrian farm where he was working.

After returning to Essex to run his own farm, Doherty and Furney set up The Essex Pig Company using free range meat production practices. Doherty gained the funds to set up the farm using the proceeds from his first book On The Farm, which formed a diary of his farming ventures.

The Essex Pig Company, is based in Ipswich, Suffolk, and raises various rare breeds, most notably the endangered Essex, and now the Berkshire, Gloucestershire Old Spots, middle Whites, and Norfolk Horn sheep among many others.

People were eager to visit the farm to see the native domestic animals and buy fresh produce so, Doherty and Furney opened the doors to the farm in 2003. To enter the farm a sign read "Jimmy's Farm". When BBC Two followed their efforts with a series of fly-on-the-wall documentaries, the name stuck.

In 2008, Doherty presented a series for BBC2 called Jimmy Doherty's Farming Heroes which aired from July 2008 to August 2008, followed by various other series and single documentaries for the BBC. Notably, Jimmy's Food Factory, in which he demonstrated the industrial techniques used in the production of processed foods, ran for two series on BBC One. When the Controller of BBC One at the time, Jay Hunt, left to become chief creative officer at Channel 4 at the end of 2010, she signed up Doherty to present exclusively for Channel 4. Doherty's last series for the BBC, A Farmer's Life for Me, was broadcast in February and March 2011.

Since 18 June 2011, Jimmy's Food Factory airs as ProSieben BBC Spezial – Jimmy's Food Factory every Saturday on German TV channel ProSieben.

In 2011, Jimmy's Farm 'Cambridge Sausage' was named in the top 10 sausages in the UK by The Independent. The sausage contains 93% pork from the farm and the recipe dates back to 1917.

In December 2012, Jimmy and Jamie Oliver presented the Channel 4 series Jamie & Jimmy's Food Fight Club. Since 2014, Doherty has co-presented the prime-time Channel 4 series Jamie & Jimmy's Friday Night Feast alongside Jamie Oliver.

Doherty and the team ensured conservation was at the forefront of their decisions and created areas at the farm for nature to blossom. As well as a flair for farming Doherty holds a passion for non-native species and, with a great team behind him, the farm applied for zoo status to help endangered species further afield. On 5 October 2016 Jimmy's Farm was awarded its zoo licence from the local authority and Jimmy's Farm & Wildlife Park was born. The first three exotic species they welcomed were Reindeer, Tapirs and Meerkats.

In 2016 Jimmy became the youngest ever President of the Rare Breeds Survival Trust a charity closely linked to his work and passions. In 2019 he became a patron of the British Beekeepers Association. He is also the patron of the British Hen Welfare Trust.

In May 2019 Jimmy's Farm & Wildlife Park became accredited by the British and Irish Association of Zoos and Aquariums (BIAZA) who represent zoos and aquariums in Britain and Ireland that pride themselves on animal welfare, education, and conservation work. In July 2021 Jimmy's Farm & Wildlife Park became the first recipient of the Rare Breed Survival Trust's new Rare Breeds Approved Associate accreditation. This has been awarded in recognition of the farm's excellence in education about the importance of Britain's endangered native livestock and equine breeds and its work to conserve their genetic characteristics.

In October 2023, Doherty rescued Ewa, a polar bear rescued from the Orsa Wildlife Park, Swedish zoo that closed down in 2022. The polar bear enclosure cost over £1m pounds to construct, and is the largest polar bear enclosure in Europe. Two more polar bears, mother and daughters Flocke and Tala, joined the park from Nuremberg Zoo, Germany, in March 2024.

== Personal life ==
Jimmy and Michaela Furney were married on 22 August 2009. The reception was held at their farm, Pannington Hall in Wherstead, Suffolk.

They have four daughters, born between 2010 and 2018.

In August 2014, Doherty was one of 200 public figures who were signatories to a letter to The Guardian expressing their hope that Scotland would vote to remain part of the United Kingdom in September's referendum on that issue.

Doherty has close links to Ipswich Town Football Club and follows their campaigns. In 2013 Jimmy's Farm created an Ipswich 'Super Blue' sausage named in honour of The Blues. The sausage, like all their sausages, was made with pork from the farm and this one included stilton and garlic.

== Academic awards ==
- Certificate of Fellowship from Harper Adams University College (September-2010)
- Honorary Graduate at University of Suffolk (October-2010)
- Honorary Degree of Doctor of the university from the University of East Anglia and the University of Essex (November-2010)
- Certificate of Associateship from the Council for Awards of Royal Agricultural Societies in recognition of distinguished achievement in the agricultural industry (August-2011)
- Honorary Doctor of Business Administration (Hon DBA) from Coventry University in recognition of contribution to food production and science by promoting responsible, sustainable farming (2014)
- Chancellor of Writtle University College in Essex (from 2022)

== Awards ==
- Outstanding Communicator from Royal Agricultural Society of England (July-2009)
- Duly Elected as Member of the Institute of Meat (October-2013)
- Elsie M J Evans Award from RSPCA for his work to raise the profile of farm animal welfare (March-2014)

== Charities supported worldwide ==
- The Ghurka Welfare Trust
- Rare Breeds Survival Trust (RBST)
- Lowland Tapir Conservation Initiative
- Animal Advocacy and Protection (AAP)

== Books ==
- On the Farm (2004)
- A Taste of the Country (2007)
- A Farmer's Life for Me (2011)

== Television series ==
- Jimmy Doherty's Big Bear Rescue (Channel 4, 2025)
- Jimmy and Shivi's Farmhouse Breakfast (ITV1 2024–present)
- Jimmy’s Taste Of Florida (ITV1 2024)
- Jimmy Doherty's New Zealand Escape (Channel 4 2023)
- Builds on Wheels (discovery+ 2021)
- Jimmy's Farm (Channel 4, 2020–present)
- Escape to the Wild (Channel 4, 2017)
- Jamie & Jimmy's Friday Night Feast (Channel 4, 2014–present)
- Food Unwrapped (Channel 4, 2012–present)
- Jamie & Jimmy's Food Fight Club (Channel 4, December 2012)
- Jimmy and the Whale Whisperer (Channel 4 2012)
- Jimmy and the Giant Supermarket (Channel 4 2012)
- A Farmer's Life for Me (BBC 2011)
- Museum of Life (BBC 2010)
- Jimmy's Global Harvest (BBC 2010)
- The Private Life of... (BBC 2010)
- Jimmy's Food Factory (BBC 2009)
- Jimmy Doherty in Darwin's Garden (OU & BBC 2009)
- Jimmy's GM Food Fight (BBC Horizon 2008)
- Jimmy and the Wild Honey Hunters (BBC 2008)
- Jimmy's Farming Heroes (BBC 2008)
- Crisis on Jimmy's Farm (BBC 2007)
- Jimmy's Farm Diaries (BBC 2007)
- Jimmy's Farm (BBC 2004–2006)
- Richard & Judy (Channel 4 2004 & 2006)
- Back on Jimmy's Farm (BBC 2004)
