= ITV Food =

- Genre: Cookery
- Country of origin: United Kingdom
- Original language: English

Original release
- Network: ITV
- Release: 2004 – present

Related
- BBC Food

ITV Food is the name given to the category of cookery shows broadcast on the ITV Network. Although the ITV Food website has been dropped there are still several cookery programmes and items on other daytime shows.

== Shows ==
| Year | Title | No. of Series | Presenter/Narrator |
|---|---|---|---|
| 2004–2005 | Too Many Cooks | 2 | Kate Garraway (2004); Jeni Barnett (2005) with Gino D'Acampo, Alex MacKay and Richard Phillips |
| 2006 | Sunday Feast | 1 | Andi Peters and Anneka Rice with Ed Baines and Paul Merrett |
| 2007 | Soapstar Superchef | 1 | Richard Arnold and Nicki Chapman with Gino D'Acampo, Keith Floyd, Jilly Goolden, Ken Hom, Jonathan Meades, Jean-Christophe Novelli, Merrilees Parker, Paul Rankin, Jay Rayner, Rosemary Shrager, Brian Turner and Antony Worrall Thompson |
| 2006–2008 | Saturday Cooks! | | Antony Worrall Thompson |
| 2007–2008 | School for Cooks | 2 | Rosemary Shrager |
| 2007–2011 | Britain's Best Dish | 6 | Mark Nicholas (2007–2010); Mary Nightingale (2011) with Ed Baines, John Burton Race and Jilly Goolden |
| 2008–2010 | Daily Cooks Challenge | 4 | Antony Worrall Thompson |
| 2009 | Taste the Nation | 1 | Nick Hancock with Henrietta Jane Green, William Sitwell and Richard Johnson |
| 2010 | Celebrity Pressure Cooker | 1 | Lorraine Kelly |
| 2010 | Kitchen Burnout | 1 | Marco Pierre White |
| 2010–2011 | Ten Mile Menu | 2 | Caroline Quentin |
| 2010–2012, 2014— | Dinner Date | 10 | Charlotte Hudson (2010–12); Natalie Casey (2014—) |
| 2010–2012 | Countrywise Kitchen | 4 | Paul Heiney and Mike Robinson |
| 2011 | There's No Taste Like Home | 1 | Gino D'Acampo |
| 2011–2013 | The Hungry Sailors | 2 | Dick Strawbridge and James Strawbridge |
| 2011–2014 | Let's Do Lunch | 4 | Melanie Sykes and Gino D'Acampo |
| 2011–2013 | Ade in Britain | 2 | Ade Edmondson |
| 2012 | Saturday Cookbook | 1 | Nadia Sawalha and Mark Sargeant |
| 2012 | My Tasty Travels with Lynda Bellingham | 1 | Lynda Bellingham |
| 2012–2014 | Britain's Best Bakery | 2 | Wendi Peters with Mich Turner and Peter Sidwell |
| 2012–2014 | Let's Do Christmas | 3 | Melanie Sykes and Gino D'Acampo |
| 2013 | Food Glorious Food | 1 | Carol Vorderman with Tom Parker Bowles, Loyd Grossman, Anne Harrison, Stacie Stewart and Andi Oliver |
| 2013 | Cook Me the Money | 1 | Adam Shaw |
| 2013 | Saturday Farm | 1 | Dick Strawbridge and James Strawbridge |
| 2013—2020 | Gino's Italian Escape | 7 | Gino D'Acampo |
| 2014–2016 | Who's Doing the Dishes? | 3 | Brian McFadden |
| 2015 | BBQ Champ | 1 | Myleene Klass with Mark Blatchford and Adam Richman |
| 2016–2017 | Chopping Block | 2 | Rosemary Shrager and John Whaite |
| 2017 | Culinary Genius | 1 | Fern Britton with Gordon Ramsay, Rosemary Shrager, Phil Vickery, Jean-Christophe Novelli |
| 2021–present | Cooking with the Stars | 5 | Emma Willis and Tom Allen |
| 2023 | Next Level Chef | 1 | Gordon Ramsay |
