= TV Choice =

British weekly television listings magazine

- Queen's Diamond Jubilee edition
- Editor-in-Chief: Gary Gillatt
- Categories: TV magazines
- Frequency: Weekly (except Christmas Specials)
- Circulation: 1,219,107 (September 1999 – present); Print and digital editions.
- Publisher: Bauer
- Founded: 1999
- First issue: 11 September 1999
- Country: United Kingdom
- Based in: London
- Language: English
- Website: TVChoiceMagazine.co.uk
- ISSN: 2044-7337

TV Choice is a British weekly TV listings magazine published by H. Bauer Publishing, the UK subsidiary of family-run German company Bauer Media Group. A double issue is released to cover the Christmas & New Year period.

== Overview ==
=== Regular issues ===
Launched on 11 September 1999, the magazine includes features on UK TV shows, including the British soap operas, and films, as well as puzzles, crosswords, a letters page and prize competitions.

==== Prices ====
The following prices have been effective.

Date	Price	Special issue price
11 September 1999 – December 1999	35p	
January 2000 – December 2000	38p	
January 2001 – February 2005	40p	
February 2005 – December 2005	30p	
January 2006 – December 2006	33p	
January 2007 – December 2007	35p	
January 2008 – December 2008	38p	
January 2009 – June 2010	40p	
July 2010 – 22 February 2012	42p	£1
29 February 2012 – 2 March 2013	45p	£1
9 March 2013	38p	N/A
16 March 2013 – 6 July 2013	20p	N/A
13 July 2013 – 16 December 2013	38p	N/A
23 December 2013 – 23 April 2015	45p	£1
30 April 2015 – 1 January 2016	50p	£1
8 January 2016 – 1 January 2017	52p	£1
8 January 2017 – 1 January 2018	55p	£1.10
8 January 2018 – 15 March 2019	57p	£1.10
22 March 2019 – 30 November 2019	62p	N/A
5 December 2019 – 2 December 2020	65p	£1.30
3 December 2020 – 1 December 2021	69p	£1.40
2 December 2021 – 2 January 2023	72p	£1.50
3 January 2023 – 1 December 2023	75p	£1.50
2 December 2023 – 29 November 2024	79p	£1.60
30 November 2024 – 25 November 2025	82p	£1.70
29 November 2025 – present	85p	£1.80

=== Christmas and New Year issues ===
A special Christmas & New Year double-issue was originally priced at £1, double the normal price. As of 9 December 2025, the seasonal issue is priced at £1.80, over twice the price of the regular 85p weekly issues.

Issue #	Date range	Released
1	18 – 31 December 1999	7 December 1999
2	23 December 2000 – 5 January 2001	12 December 2000
3	22 December 2001 – 4 January 2002	11 December 2001
4	21 December 2002 – 3 January 2003	10 December 2002
5	20 December 2003 – 2 January 2004	9 December 2003
6	18 – 31 December 2004	7 December 2004
7	17 – 30 December 2005	6 December 2005
8	23 December 2006 – 5 January 2007	12 December 2006
9	22 December 2007 – 4 January 2008	11 December 2007
10	20 December 2008 – 2 January 2009	9 December 2008
11	19 December 2009 – 1 January 2010	8 December 2009
12	18 – 31 December 2010	7 December 2010
13	17 – 30 December 2011	6 December 2011
14	22 December 2012 – 4 January 2013	11 December 2012
15	21 December 2013 – 3 January 2014	10 December 2013
16	20 December 2014 – 2 January 2015	9 December 2014
17	19 December 2015 – 1 January 2016	8 December 2015
18	17 – 30 December 2016	6 December 2016
19	23 December 2017 – 5 January 2018	12 December 2017
20	22 December 2018 – 4 January 2019	11 December 2018
21	21 December 2019 – 3 January 2020	10 December 2019
22	19 December 2020 – 1 January 2021	8 December 2020
23	18 – 31 December 2021	7 December 2021
24	24 December 2022 – 6 January 2023	13 December 2022
25	23 December 2023 – 5 January 2024	12 December 2023
26	21 December 2024 – 3 January 2025	10 December 2024
27	20 December 2025 – 2 January 2026	9 December 2025

== Podcast ==
In February 2022, it was announced that TV Choice would release its first ever podcast entitled My TV Years, with television presenter and radio DJ Mel Giedroyc hosting. The podcast ran for eight weeks, on a Wednesday, with the first airing 23 February 2022, and the final episode on 13 April 2022.

=== Episodes ===
No.	Broadcast date	Runtime	Celebrity guest	Known for
1	23 February 2022	44 minutes	Sanjeev Bhaskar	The Kumars at No. 42, Goodness Gracious Me and Unforgotten
2	2 March 2022 (Note: In light of recent events related to the ongoing conflict crisis in Ukraine, this episode was prerecorded in the first week of February 2022.)	43 minutes	Kirstie Allsopp	Presenter of Location, Location, Location and Love It or List It
3	9 March 2022	44 minutes	Hugh Dennis	Outnumbered, Mock The Week and Not Going Out
4	16 March 2022	40 minutes	Sally Ann Matthews	Coronation Street's Jenny Connor
5	23 March 2022	45 minutes	Adjoa Andoh	Star of BBC's Doctor Who, Casualty and EastEnders, and Netflix's Bridgerton
6	30 March 2022	37 minutes	Jon Richardson	Comedian
7	6 April 2022	34 minutes	Morgana Robinson	Impressionist, comedian, writer and actress extraordinaire
8	13 April 2022	42 minutes	Alex Horne	Taskmaster creator and co-host

== Circulation ==
In February 2008, TV Choice became the biggest selling (actively purchased) magazine of all categories in the UK, a position it has held ever since. It sells over 1.2 million copies a week and has an adult readership of 1.8 million. It has a target market among C1 C2 young, mass market adults.

== Awards ==
TV Choice also has its own annual awards ceremony, the TV Choice Awards originally called the TV Quick Awards, awarded on the basis of a public vote by readers of TV Choice. The following categories and winners are shown from the 2009 awards to the present day.

Category	Winners
Best Reality Show	The Apprentice; I'm a Celebrity...Get Me Out of Here! The Traitors
Best Actor	Philip Glenister; Jack O'Connell; David Tennant; Benedict Cumberbatch; Tom Hiddleston; Cillian Murphy; Adrian Dunbar and more
Best Game Show	Deal or No Deal; Total Wipeout; The Cube and more
Best Talent Show	Britain's Got Talent; The Great British Bake Off; Strictly Come Dancing and more
Best Comedy Show	The Inbetweeners; Gavin & Stacey; Mrs. Brown's Boys; Benidorm; Birds of a Feather; Peter Kay's Car Share; After Life and more
Best Soap Actress	Katherine Kelly; Michelle Keegan; Alison King; Lacey Turner; Jessie Wallace; Lindsay Coulson; Charlotte Bellamy; Emma Atkins and more
Best Daytime Show	Loose Women; The Jeremy Kyle Show; This Morning; The Chase
Best Soap Actor	Simon Gregson; Danny Miller; Shane Richie; Danny Dyer; Ryan Hawley and more
Best Entertainment Show	Ant & Dec's Saturday Night Takeaway; Alan Carr: Chatty Man; Celebrity Juice; The Graham Norton Show Gogglebox
Best Soap Newcomer: Actresses	Lauren Crace; Paula Lane; Kirsty-Leigh Porter; Sally Dexter; Kara-Leah Fernandes
Best Soap Newcomer: Actors	Adam Thomas; Tony Discipline; David Witts; Davood Ghadami; Shayne Ward; Ned Porteous
Outstanding Contribution	Ant & Dec; Coronation Street; Emmerdale; Doctor Who; EastEnders; Barbara Windsor; Mary Berry
Best Soap Storyline	Danielle and Ronnie's Story in EastEnders; Aaron's gay self-loathing in Emmerdale; Hayley Cropper's Cancer, Coronation Street
Best Family Drama	Waterloo Road; Doctor Who; Call the Midwife
Best Soap	EastEnders; Coronation Street; Emmerdale
Best Drama Series	Ashes to Ashes; Being Human; Sherlock; Doctor Who; Broadchurch; Downton Abbey
Best New Drama	Merlin; Glee; Sherlock; Call the Midwife; Broadchurch; Happy Valley; Poldark; Doctor Foster; Little Boy Blue; Liar; Bodyguard
Best Actress	Sheridan Smith; Sarah Lancashire; Olivia Colman; Michelle Keegan; Jodie Comer
Soap Moment of the Year	Coronation Street's 50th Anniversary Tram Crash scene Emmerdale Live Episode
Best International Show	The Big Bang Theory; Game of Thrones
Best Food Show	Gordon Ramsay's F Word; Jamie's 30 Minute Meals; The Hairy Bikers' Bakeation; Jamie's 15-Minute Meals; Gordon Ramsay's Home Cooking; Saturday Kitchen; Sunday Brunch; Gino's Italian Escape: Hidden Italy; Gordon, Gino and Fred: Road Trip James Martin's Saturday Morning
Best Factual Entertainment & Lifestyle Show	Top Gear; Come Dine with Me; Supersize vs. Superskinny; Paul O'Grady: For the Love of Dogs; Educating Yorkshire; Gogglebox; DIY SOS: The Big Build; Blue Planet II
