= Country House Sunday =

British television series

- Genre: Lifestyle and travel
- Presented by: Lynda Bellingham
- Starring: Lynda Bellingham, James Tanner, Paul Hayes.
- Country of origin: United Kingdom
- Original language: English
- No. of series: 1
- No. of episodes: 21

Production
- Production location: Britain
- Production companies: Twofour (for ITV Breakfast)

Original release
- Network: ITV
- Release: 21 April – 8 September 2013

Country House Sunday is a British television series presented by Lynda Bellingham. In the program the actress Lynda Bellingham. along with her travel team visit some of Britain's largest and grandest stately homes. It was produced by Twofour.

The show aired on Sunday mornings on ITV at 8.25am (during the ITV Breakfast slot). The series began broadcasting on 21 April 2013 and ended on 8 September 2013, with 21 episodes being made.

== Episodes ==
Show	Broadcast Date	Location	Guest Presenters
1	21 April 2013	Renishaw Hall, Derbyshire	Lisa Heathcote, Christine Beevers, James Tanner & Claire Richards
2	28 April 2013	Ragley Hall, Warwickshire	Seren Evans-Charrington, Ed Baines & James Tanner
3	5 May 2013	Reinshaw Hall, Derbyshire	Notty Hornblower, Paul Hayes, Christine Beevers, James Tanner & Stacie Stewart
4	12 May 2013	Ugbrooke Park, Devon	Larry Lamb, Tom Keane & Paul Ainsworth
5	19 May 2013	Ragley Hall, Warwickshire	Larry Lamb, Paul Hayes & James Tanner
6	26 May 2013	Reinshaw Hall, Derbyshire	Larry Lamb & James Tanner
7	2 June 2013	Ugbrooke Park, Devon	Tom Keane, Ed Baines & Paul Ainsworth
8	9 June 2013	Ragley Hall, Warwickshire	Ed Baines, Paul Hayes & James Tanner
9	16 June 2013	Renishaw Hall, Derbyshire	Lisa Heathcote, Paul Hayes & James Tanner
10	23 June 2013	Ugbrooke Park, Devon	Ed Baines, Tom Keane & Paul Ainsworth
11	30 June 2013	Ragley Hall, Warwickshire	Paul Hayes, Ed Baines & James Tanner
12	7 July 2013	Renishaw Hall, Derbyshire	Seren Evans-Charrington, Christine Beevers, Paul Hayes, Claire Richards & James Tanner
13	14 July 2013	Ugbrooke Park, Devon	Larry Lamb, Tom Keane & Paul Ainsworth
14	21 July 2013	Ragley Hall, Warwickshire	Stacie Stewart, Paul Hayes & James Tanner
15	28 July 2013	Reinshaw Hall, Derbyshire	Claire Richards, Barry Colenso, Paul Hayes & James Tanner
16	4 August 2013	Ugbrooke Park, Devon	Stacie Stewart, Tom Keane & Paul Ainsworth
17	11 August 2013	Ragley Hall, Warwickshire	Paul Hayes, Ed Baines & James Tanner
18	18 August 2013	Reinshaw Hall, Derbyshire	Larry Lamb, Paul Hayes & James Tanner
19	25 August 2013	Ragley Hall, Warwickshire	Stacie Stewart, Paul Hayes & James Tanner
20	1 September 2013	Ugbrooke Park, Devon	Stacie Stewart, Tom Keane & Paul Ainsworth
21	8 September 2013	Ragley Hall, Warwickshire	Stacie Stewart, Paul Hayes & James Tanner
