= Taste the Nation =

- Presented by: Nick Hancock
- Country of origin: United Kingdom
- No. of episodes: 30

Production
- Producer: ITV Studios
- Running time: 60 minutes (inc. advertisements)

Original release
- Network: ITV
- Release: 16 March – 24 April 2009

Related
- ITV Food

Taste the Nation is a British daytime cookery show on the ITV Network. The judges are Henrietta Green, William Sitwell and Richard Johnson. Nick Hancock is the host of the show, which airs weekdays at 5pm.

The Chefs

Region	Chef
The North East	Rosemary Shrager
Scotland	Nick Nairn
South East	Ed Bains
North West	Merrilees Parker
South West	John Burton Race
Midlands	Anthony Worral Thompson
The East	Martin Blunos
Wales	Graham Tinsley

Series Guides
Series 1: 16 March – 24 April 2009

== Round 1 ==
Team 1	Chef Captain	Team 2	Chef Captain	Winner
Cornwall	John Burton Race	Nottinghamshire	Anthony Worral Thompson	Cornwall
Aberdeenshire	Nick Nairn	Middlesex	Ed Bains	Aberdeenshire
Lancashire	Merrilees Parker	North Yorkshire	Rosemary Shrager	Lancashire
Glamorgan	Graham Tinsley	Lincolnshire	Martin Blunos	Glamorgan
Perthshire	Nick Nairn	Leicestershire & Rutland	Anthony Worral Thompson	Perthshire
Cheshire	Merrilees Parker	Wiltshire	John Burton Race	Wiltshire
Surrey	Ed Bains	Suffolk	Martin Blunos	Surrey
Carmarthenshire	Graham Tinsley	Northumberland	Rosemary Shrager	Northumberland
Cambridgeshire	Martin Blunos	Somerset	John Burton Race	Somerset
Shropshire	Merrilees Parker	Gloucestershire	Anthony Worral Thompson	Gloucestershire
West Yorkshire	Rosemary Shrager	Kent	Ed Bains	Kent
Monmouthshire	Graham Tinsley	Midlothian	Nick Nairn	Midlothian
Devon	John Burton Race	East Riding of Yorkshire	Rosemary Shrager	Devon
Hertfordshire	Ed Bains	Warwickshire	Anthony Worral Thompson	Warwickshire
Norfolk	Martin Blunos	Lanarkshire	Nick Nairn	Norfolk
Denbighshire	Graham Tinsley	County Down	Merrilees Parker	County Down

== Round 2 ==
Team 1	Chef Captain	Team 2	Chef Captain	Winner
Cornwall	John Burton Race	Lancashire	Merrilees Parker	Cornwall
Aberdeenshire	Nick Nairn	Glamorgan	Graham Tinsley	Aberdeenshire
Wiltshire	John Burton Race	Perthshire	Nick Nairn	Perthshire
Surrey	Ed Bains	Northumberland	Rosemary Shrager	Northumberland
Gloucestershire	Anthony Worral Thompson	Kent	Ed Bains	Kent
Somerset	John Burton Race	Midlothian	Nick Nairn	Somerset
Warwickshire	Anthony Worral Thompson	Devon	John Burton Race	Warwickshire
Norfolk	Martin Blunos	County Down	Merrilees Parker	County Down

== Quarter finals ==
Team 1	Chef Captain	Team 2	Chef Captain	Winner
Somerset	John Burton Race	Northumberland	Rosemary Shrager	Northumberland
Kent	Ed Bains	Warwickshire	Anthony Worral Thompson	Kent
Aberdeenshire	Nick Nairn	Perthshire	Nick Nairn	Aberdeenshire
Cornwall	John Burton Race	County Down	Merrilees Parker	County Down

== Semi finals ==
Team 1	Chef Captain	Team 2	Chef Captain	Winner
Aberdeenshire	Nick Nairn	County Down	Merrilees Parker	Aberdeenshire
Kent	Ed Bains	Northumberland	Rosemary Shrager	Northumberland

== Final ==
Team 1	Chef Captain	Team 2	Chef Captain	Winner
Aberdeenshire	Nick Nairn	Northumberland	Rosemary Shrager	Northumberland

== Chef Victories ==
Nick	John	Rosemary	Ed	Merrilees	Anthony	Martin	Graham
7	6	5	4	4	3	1	1

== See also ==
- Britain's Best Dish
