= James Tanner =

English chef and television personality

- Born: Tunbridge Wells, Kent, England
- Relatives: Chris Tanner (brother)
- Culinary career
- Current restaurant(s): The Barbican Kitchen The Kentish Hare Catch
- Previous restaurant(s): Brookers Oast Tanners Restaurant
- Television show(s): Ready Steady Cook (until 2010) Saturday Kitchen (regular) Lorraine (2010–2017)

James Tanner is an English chef and television personality, best known for co-owning the Tanners Restaurant in Plymouth and cooking on various TV programmes.

In 1999, Tanner and his brother Chris set up Tanners Restaurant in Plymouth. Since then, he has appeared on the BBC cookery programme Ready Steady Cook and more recently the ITV Breakfast programme Lorraine.

== Early life ==
The third of four brothers, Tanner was born in Maidstone, Kent.

Tanner began his catering career, preparing salads and starters, in "Brookers Oast" a Whitbread Brewers Fayre in Kent in the early 1990s After studying hotel management he worked in the kitchens of several restaurants, often with his older brother, fellow celebrity chef Chris Tanner. Tanner worked his way up through the ranks until he was invited by the Roux brothers, Michel and Albert, to move to the US and work in upstate New York, where he was Chef de partie at the Lake Placid Lodge. Within four months, he was promoted to junior Sous-chef.

== Career ==
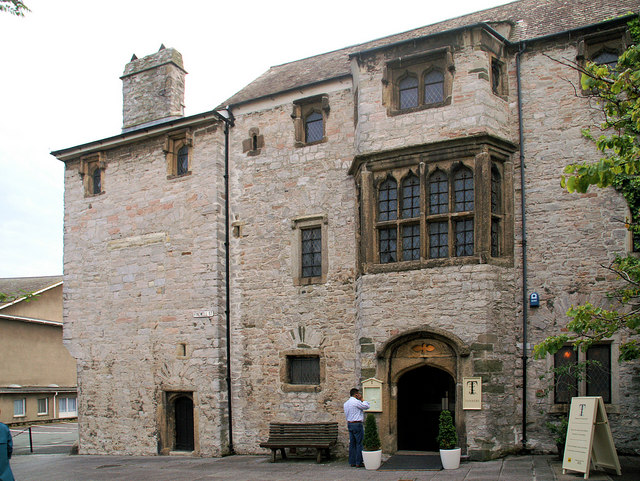
Tanners Restaurant opened in Prysten House in Plymouth in 1999

Tanner worked his way up the ranks and on returning to England took a job under Martin Blunos at the two Michelin-starred restaurant Lettonie in Bath before a Head Chef role at Right on the Green in Kent.

In 1999, aged 23, Tanner and his brother opened Tanners Restaurant in Plymouth. The restaurant closed in October 2014.

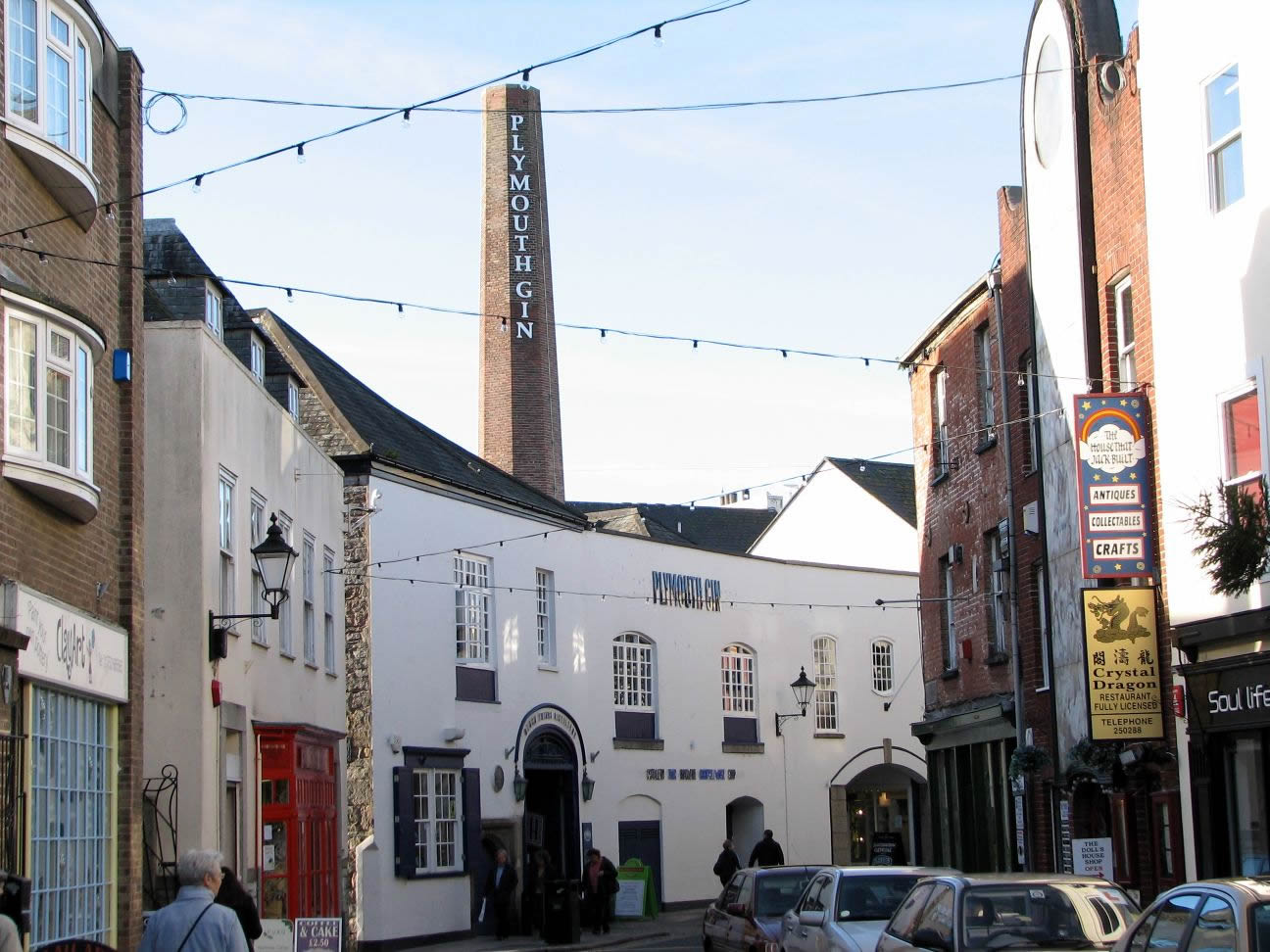
The Barbican Kitchen opened in the Plymouth Gin Distillery in 2006

In Spring 2006, the Tanner brothers opened a second restaurant in Plymouth, The Barbican Kitchen, a brasserie sited within the Plymouth Gin Distillery, a 500-year-old building in the heart of Plymouth's oldest area, The Barbican.

In 2007, the Tanner brothers were awarded Honorary Doctorate of Arts from Plymouth University. In April 2011, the Tanner brothers opened The Kitchen Cafe, serving snack style foods as an offshoot from the brasserie style cuisine.

In May 2014, the brothers opened a pub called The Kentish Hare in Bidborough in Kent. In 2015, they opened a fish and chip restaurant, Catch, in Looe in Cornwall.

=== Television ===
Tanner's television career began in 2002 when he and his brother made their first TV appearance on a competition called Chef Stars, a promotion run by UKTV Food and broadcast predominantly on their now cancelled Great Food Live. The brothers, however, did not make it through to the final.

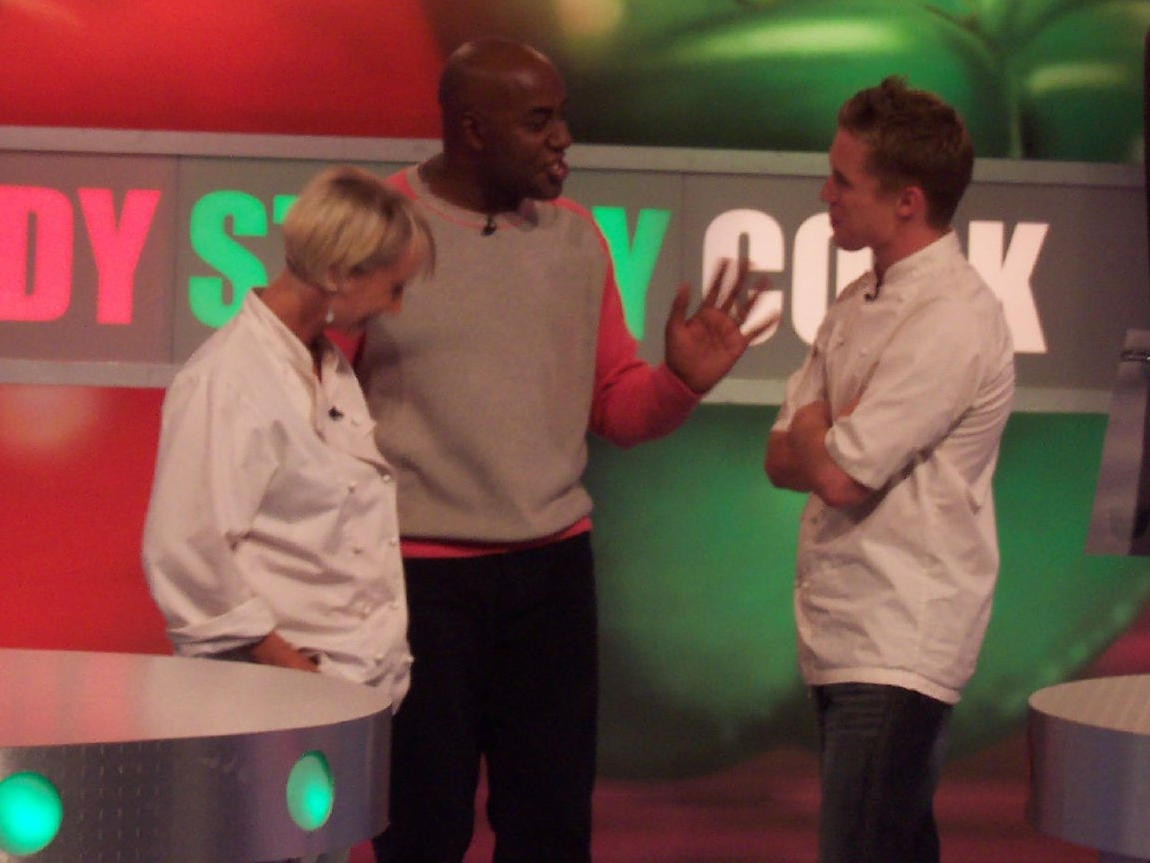
James Tanner (right) with Ainsley Harriott and Lesley Waters on set of Ready Steady Cook in 2004

Tanner became a semi-regular guest on Great Food Live which was shot at the same studios as Ready Steady Cook. He was recommended to audition for the show and became a regular. At the heart of his style during his TV appearances is the repetition of his catchphrase "like so", used to make various culinary techniques seem easy, encouraging members of the public to give them a try, and also to assuage viewers' fears of unfamiliar ingredients, as well as "dig down deep".

He appeared in the 2009 series Put Your Money Where Your Mouth Is: Food. From 2010 until 2017, Tanner was a regular chef on the ITV Breakfast programme Lorraine.

Tanner has occasionally appeared on Saturday Kitchen. He made regular appearances in Country House Sunday as well as a few appearances on ITV's Saturday Cookbook and The Munch Box. In 2019 Tanner appeared as a chef on Channel 4's Beat the Chef

=== Books ===
- For Chocolate Lovers – Published 5 October 2006, co-written by Chris Tanner
- Ice Cream – Published 25 March 2008, co-written by Chris Tanner
- James Tanner Takes 5: Delicious Dishes Using Just 5 Ingredients – Published 30 September 2010
- Old Favourites, New Twists: 100 classic recipes with a difference – Published 11 July 2013
