= Sunday Feast =

British television series

- Genre: Cookery
- Presented by: Andi Peters, Anneka Rice
- Country of origin: United Kingdom

Production
- Producer: Prospect Pictures
- Running time: 60 minutes

Original release
- Network: ITV
- Release: 11 June 2006

Related
- ITV Food

Sunday Feast is a British cookery show on British television channel ITV, broadcast in 2006. The show's hosts are Andi Peters and Anneka Rice. Their two resident chefs, who alternate week by week, are Ed Baines and Paul Merrett.

The show is made by Prospect Pictures, who produce other food shows including Saturday Cooks!, Great Food Live and Food Uncut, and have previously produced Taste for Sky One.

The show features a special guest each week, a look at the Sunday newspapers, and up to 3 recipes cooked by that episode's chef.

Sunday Feast aired on Sunday mornings at 10am. The show was cancelled due to low ratings.
