= Bruno Cormerais =

- Born: 17 July 1969 (age 57); Lagny-sur-Marne, Seine-et-Marne, France
- Occupations: Baker, television host
- Years active: 2008–present
- Known for: La Meilleure Boulangerie de France
- Television: M6 (2013–present)

Bruno Cormerais (born 17 July 1969) is a French baker, Meilleur Ouvrier de France and television host of the baking contest La Meilleure Boulangerie de France (French version of Britain's Best Bakery) on the channel M6.

== Early life and education ==
As a child who grew up at the countryside, Bruno Cormerais developed a taste for cooking alongside his mother and his grandmother. In addition, his great-grandmother was a cook for the Rothschild family.

At the age of 16, he began his training course made in the bakehouse of a friend of his parents in Gouvernes, Seine-et-Marne. He obtained a CAP (Certificat d'Aptitude Professionnelle) in baking in 1986, then one in pastry the following year, and finally his BM (Brevet de Maîtrise) in baking in 1992 in Montévrain, Seine-et-Marne then in Villeneuve-le-Comte, Seine-et-Marne. In the meantime, in 1989, he made his military service and was sent to Berlin where he assisted at the Berlin Wall fall.

== Career ==
During 17 years, Bruno Cormerais was a baking adviser of a miller who moved from bakery to bakery to teach the making of sourdough bread in particular.

During his career, Bruno Cormerais has participated at many contests. As a result, he was named Meilleur Ouvrier de France in baking after four years of training, and became three years later the owner of a bakery located in Bussy-Saint-Georges in the department of Seine-et-Marne. He was also rewarded of many other distinctions, including the gold medal at the Foire d'Arpajon, Essonne, silver medal in Romorantin-Lanthenay, Loir-et-Cher, and silver medal at the Baguette de Paris, among others.

In 2013, at the age of 44, he became the co-host of the popular television baking contest La Meilleure Boulangerie de France, the French version of Britain's Best Bakery. From 2013 to 2015, he co-hosted with baker Gontran Cherrier, and then from 2016 with cooking chef Norbert Tarayre. Since 2023, it is the pastry chef Noëmie Honiat who co-hosts the contest with him.

In April 2021, he opened a new bakery aside a miller in Gien in the department of Loiret. He opened another bakery in January 2022 in Bourcefranc-le-Chapus in the department of Charente-Maritime, associated with two other bakers, Étienne Rousseau and Tony Gibier.
