= Britain's Best Bakery =

- Genre: Cooking
- Judges: Mich Turner; Peter Sidwell
- Voices of: Wendi Peters
- Country of origin: United Kingdom
- Original language: English
- No. of series: 2
- No. of episodes: 50

Production
- Running time: 60 minutes (inc. adverts)
- Production company: Shine TV

Original release
- Network: ITV
- Release: 26 November 2012 – 14 February 2014

Related
- ITV Food

Britain's Best Bakery is a British daytime cookery show part of the ITV Food category on ITV and narrated by Wendi Peters with judges Mich Turner and Peter Sidwell. The show aired from 26 November 2012 to 14 February 2014.

== Gameplay ==
The TV program is a talent show where the target is try the best independent, family-run or community bakery. Bakeries from all over the UK compete in a series of baking challenges that put their skills to the test and make viewers’ mouths water. It's a tough competition: traditional bakers with top-secret family recipes compete against former patisserie chefs and bread-makers are challenged to create stunning celebration cakes. Two big names from the world of baking judge the competition, not just tasting and analysing the bakes but visiting the bakeries. The competition builds from regional heats to a dramatic finale where the winner of Britains Best Bakery is crowned. Britains Best Bakery shines a light on baking in the UK in all its delicious shapes and sizes. But more than just a competition, it is a celebration of the nations bakeries and their bakers, revealing fascinating stories about Britain and its regions, communities and cultures.

In every episode, bakeries competed in regional heats, with rounds including the "Speciality Bake" and "Baker's Dozen", with the daily winners advancing to cook a "Judge's Choice Cake" in the regional finals on Friday. National finals in the last week featured challenges such as "Chelsea buns for the Chelsea Pensioners", and a great wedding cake from someone British.

== Transmissions ==
Series	Episodes	Originally released	
Series	Episodes	First released	Last released
1	20	26 November 2012	21 December 2012
2	30	6 January 2014	14 February 2014

=== Series 1 ===
The first series was won by Hambleton Bakery.

=== Series 2 ===
The second series was won by brother and sister, David and Lindsay Wright, from The Cake Shop Bakery from Woodbridge in Suffolk.

== International versions ==
The format has been adapted in France, Portugal, Germany, Finland and Italy.

Country	Title	Host(s)	Judges	TV channel	Seasons
France	La Meilleure Boulangerie de France	—N/a	Current Bruno Cormerais (1-); Norbert Tarayre (4-); Noëmie Honiat (10-); Former; Gontran Cherrier (1-3)	M6	Season 1, 2013: Christophe Rouget; Season 2, 2014: Patrice Monchaussé; Season 3, 2015: Christophe Prodel; Season 4, 2016: Boulangerie Utopie; Season 5, 2017: Boulangerie Maison Lamour; Season 6, 2018: La Fougasse d’Uzès; Season 7, 2019: Du Pain pour demain Season 8, 2020: Aux délices normands
Portugal	Best Bakery - A Melhor Pastelaria de Portugal	Ana Guiomar	Luca Arguelles; Telmo Moutinho	SIC	Season 1, 2016: Sabores d'Avenida
Finland	Suomen paras leipomo	—N/a	Hans Välimäki; Jenni Höijer	Jim	Season 1, 2014: Aroma Bageri ja Konditori; Season 2, 2015: MBakery
Germany	Deutschlands bester Bäcker	—N/a	Johann Lafer; Bernd Kütscher; Eveline Wild; Jochen Baier; Sabine Baumgarten	ZDF	Season 1, 2014: Arno Simon
Italy	Best Bakery - La migliore pasticceria d'Italia	—N/a	Current Alessandro Servida (2); Andreas Acherer (2); Former; Paco Torreblanca (1); Alexandre Bourdeaux (1)	TV8; Sky Uno	Season 1, 2018: Pasticceria Alfa; Season 2, 2020: Pasticceria Citterio
