= Million Pound Menu =

English game-show reality television series

- Also known as: My Million Pound Menu
- Genre: Game show Reality
- Country of origin: United Kingdom
- Original language: English
- No. of series: 2
- No. of episodes: 12

Production
- Running time: 60 min
- Production companies: Electric Ray; Sony Pictures Television; BBC

Original release
- Network: BBC Two
- Release: 17 May 2018 – 19 February 2019

My Million Pound Menu was a BBC reality television series which ran from 2018 to 2019, where budding restaurateurs would present food concepts to a panel of industry-leading investors in hopes of winning investment. It was presented by Fred Sirieix, a professional maitre d'hotel turned television personality. It was described the Guardian as "Dragons' Den meets MasterChef".

The programme was broadcast on BBC Two, with the first series of six episodes broadcast from 17 May to 21 June 2018. The second series also comprising six episodes was broadcast from 8 January to 19 February 2019. Although not cancelled, no further series were made, possibly due to the 2020 COVID-19 pandemic. Episodes are now available to stream on Netflix. Investment offer ranged from £95,000 to nearly £1 million.

== Development ==
The UK restaurant industry is worth £35 billion a year. The vast majority of restaurants close within a year of opening. Meredith Chambers, managing director of production company Electric Ray, said he came up with the concept after meeting the agent of well known chef who said that it was common practice for prospective restaurateurs seeking investors to make them dinner to demonstrate the concept and their skills. Chambers felt this would translate well to a reality tv format. The show also discussed and depicted trends within the culinary industry in the UK, such as the increasing popularity of vegan food and up-and-coming world cuisines. Million Pound Menu was praised for its depiction of the process of developing a successful restaurant business, with Fred Sirieix commenting: "Everybody in the hospitality industry dreams of owning their own restaurant and they all worry about getting capital but we show it’s important you also meet the right investors and that you have a simple but scalable concept. It’s not just about great cooking, you need knowledge of HR, marketing and basic finance too."

== Format ==
Originally titled Million Pound Menu, in each episode of the first series, a number of participants (it is never shown how many) pitch their ideas via video conference to a table of investors. Two new restaurant ideas are selected to move through to the next stage - their own pop-up restaurant in Manchester for two days in an attempt to gain backing from the investors. Each teams gets a restaurant opposite the other on the same street. The two participants/teams are given two weeks and access to an interior design team to produce a concept that aligns with their vision.

On the first evening, the restaurant runs a soft launch evening service (where customers receive a 50% discount) and serves the investors dinner from their menu. The next day, the participants meet with interested investors individually to go through their business plan and answer questions. At this point, investors who are thinking of investing give an indication of what their proposed investment would likely look like - often the investors are looking for promising concepts to gave spaces in their existing developments. After this, the participants then run a lunch service which the investors also attend, often sitting at the bar so they can observe the kitchen operating. Investors can drop out at any point, but after lunch, they have until 8 pm to decide whether they wish to invest or not. If multiple investors make offers, the team picks the investor they want to work with.

In series two, the format was changed to give investors greater opportunities to interact with the different aspects of the concept. Three concept teams of hopeful restaurateurs prepare their signature dish for four potential investors, who make comments to camera about the value of the idea. By majority vote, the investors select one team to open a two-day pop-up restaurant in Manchester. (Investors can drop out at any point). Once in Manchester, the concept team runs a soft-launch dinner service. The investors dine with each other during this service. On the morning of the second day, the concept team has one-hour business meetings with each investor. Afterwards, the team conducts a full-price lunch, where the remaining investors dine alone and also interview customers. Afterwards, the investors are given a deadline of 7pm to return to the restaurant to present an offer.

== Investors ==
The panel of investors changed with every episode, but included:

- Atul Kochhar, celebrity chef
- Scott Collins, co-founder of burger and cocktail group MEATliquor
- Darrel Connell, partner at investment group Imbiba Partnership
- Jeremy Roberts, CEO of Living Ventures, a restaurant and bar group
- Tim Gee, Property Director at Allied London, a property development and investment company
- Chris Miller, Founder of White Rabbit Fund, a restaurant investment group
- David Page, Chairman of The Fulham Shore, a restaurant investment group
- Jamie Barber, a restaurateur of several food chains
- Shruti Ajitsaria, angel investor and lawyer for Allen & Overy

Series 2 only:

- Charlie McVeigh, pub chain owner
- Maurice Abboudi, angel investor and executive director of K10 Japanese restaurants
- Jane O'Riordan, angel investor and Group Strategy Director of Nando's
- Matt Farrell, a Liverpool-based food and drink investor
- Laura Harper-Hinton, CEO of restaurant group Caravan
- Will Shu, CEO of Deliveroo

== Broadcast history ==
=== Series 1 ===
Episode	First aired	Entrepreneur(s)	Brand name	Investment sought	Description of product	Investment offered	Investor	Website	Fate	
Episode	Episode 1	17 May 2018	Ruth Hansom and Emily Lambert	Epoch	£600,000 to open a restaurant in London	All-British fine dining	£750,000	Atul Kochhar	N/A	Dissolved in 2019 - both candidates took other jobs
Episode 1	17 May 2018	Ewan Hutchison	Shrimpwreck	£100,000 to open a restaurant in Scotland	Tempura prawn buns fast casual	None offered - Scott Collins offered mentorship	N/A		Continues to operate as a street stall (2022)	
Episode 2	24 May 2018	Oli, Joe and Michael	FINCA	£150,000 to open a restaurant in Liverpool	Cuban-inspired street food	£150,000	Jeremy Roberts	N/A	Unclear - several residencies	
Episode 2	24 May 2018	Chelsea Campbell	Wholesome Junkies	£95,000 to open a restaurant in Manchester	Vegan junk food	None offered - Chris Miller offered mentorship	N/A		Restaurant opened in August 2022	
Episode 3	31 May 2018	Ronnie Murray and Jamie Randall	Hollings	£200,000 to open a restaurant	British chophouse	Atul Kochhar offered the full amount for investment, but the participants declined after he required them to give up their additional employments to focus full-time on Hollings	Atul Kochhar	N/A	Dissolved (2019) - Murray opened another concept and Randall started a marketing agency	
Episode 3	31 May 2018	Graham Bradbury	The Cheese Wheel		Italian fresh pasta	None offered	N/A		Continues to operate as a street stall (2022)	
Episode 4	2 June 2018	Lee Bardon and Faai Kerphol	Greedy Khao		Vegan Thai grab-and-go	None offered	N/A	-	Active (2019)	
Episode 4	2 June 2018	Prince Owusu	Trap Kitchen		Soul-food inspired takeaway	None offered	N/A	-	Active (2019)	
Episode 5	14 June 2018	Jay Morjaria	Dynasty		Korean fine dining	£500,000 and residency in Forte Berlin hotel	Lydia Forte	-	Active (2019)	
Episode 5	14 June 2018	Rupert Smith and Marita Lietz	Bubble&		Bubble and squeak	None offered - Atul Kochhar offered mentorship	N/A	-	Unknown	
Episode 6	21 June 2018	Liz and Stew Down	Black Bear Burger	£250,000 to launch a national chain	Premium burgers	None offered	N/A	-	Active (2019)	
Episode 6	21 June 2018	Jennifer Henry and Hannah Adams	Naked Dough	£250,000 to launch a national chain	Raw cookie dough	None offered	N/A		Operates as ecommerce store (2022)	

=== Series 2 ===
Episode	First aired	Entrepreneur(s)	Brand name	Investment sought	Description of product	Investment offered	Investor	Website	Fate	
Episode	Episode 1	8 January 2019	Lee Johnson and Sinead Campbell	BBQ Dreamz	£350,000 to open a restaurant in London	Fiilipino street food	£350,000	Charlie McVeigh		Opened as Bong Bong Manila Canteen in Hackney in 2021
Episode 2	15 January 2019	Liz Selway and Alec Owen	Baba G's	£300,000 to open two restaurants	Indian-spiced burgers and fries	Jamie Barber offered £200,000, Atul Kochhar offered £300,000	Atul Kochhar		Restaurant opened in Brixton in 2019	
Episode 3	22 January 2019	Jamie Duffield, Dave Bone and Anthony Power	Pilgrim	£400,000 to open a restaurant in London	Spanish fine dining themed on the Camino de Santiago	Matt Farrell offered a place in the Duke Street Market Hall in Liverpool	Matt Farrell		Opened in Liverpool in 2019	
Episode 4	5 February 2019	Tanya Gohil	Devi's	£650,000 to open a restaurant in London	Indian vegetarian and sustainable street food	None offered - Laura Harper-Hinton offered mentorship	N/A		Active (2022)	
Episode 5	12 February 2019	Scott De Lima and Lacey Miles	Tiger Bites	£250,000 to open a restaurant in London	Asian fusion street food	Will Shu offered a spot in a Deliveroo dark kitchen	Will Shu	-	Active (2022)	
Episode 6	19 February 2019	Adam Wood and Gethin Davies	Coracle	£750,000 to open a restaurant in London	Welsh-inspired British cooking	None offered - Atul Kochhar offered mentorship	N/A	-	Dissolved - Wood became head chef at a Cambridge hotel owned by Chris Miller	
