= Kitchen Criminals =

2007 British television series

- Starring: Angela Hartnett; John Burton Race
- Country of origin: United Kingdom
- Original language: English
- No. of series: 1
- No. of episodes: 20

Production
- Running time: 29 min. per episode

Original release
- Network: BBC Two
- Release: 13 August – 7 September 2007

Kitchen Criminals is a BBC television series in which top chefs John Burton Race and Angela Hartnett are given the task of travelling the length and breadth of the United Kingdom, looking for Britain's worst cooks. After selecting the 20 worst, the amateur cooks must undertake a series of cookery challenges until only one contestant from each team is left. The 2 remaining contestants must then cook a meal for 3 top food critics.
