= Lorne Spicer =

English television presenter

- Born: 16 September 1965 (age 60); Upminster, Greater London, England
- Occupation: Television presenter
- Years active: 2002–present
- Spouse: Martin Donovan (divorced)

Lorne Spicer (born 16 September 1965 in Upminster, Greater London) is an English television presenter best known for presenting reality shows on the BBC's daytime output.

Spicer started out as a reporter for BBC Radio Norfolk, and later wrote a weekly collectibles column in the Mail on Sunday. She went to Coopers' Company and Coborn School and has a degree in Communication Studies (Media). She produced a morning European business-news show and a personal-finance show. Spicer also presented various programmes for ITV and BBC One such as Boot Sale Challenge and was a regular guest on money matters for This Morning and GMTV. She also participated in the BBC programme Put Your Money Where Your Mouth Is, where she competed against Mark Franks to raise money for charity. In the early 1980s, she spent some time working as a magician's assistant.

Spicer was also the presenter of the daytime BBC Television programme Car Booty.

Spicer lives in Thundersley, Essex, and is divorced with one son. In 2009, it was reported that Spicer had filed for bankruptcy.

== Television programmes ==
- Car Booty
- Money Spinners
- Put Your Money Where Your Mouth Is
- Trash to Cash
- Trading Treasures
- Cash in the Attic
- Everything Must Go
- Boot Sale Challenge
- My Life for Sale
- Beat the Bailiff

They were all broadcast on the BBC except Everything Must Go and Bootsale Challenge, which were on ITV. Currently, My Life for Sale and Cash in the Attic are being syndicated in the United States on Vibrant TV Network.
