= There's No Taste Like Home =

- Genre: Cooking
- Presented by: Gino D'Acampo
- Narrated by: Jess Brohn
- Country of origin: United Kingdom
- Original language: English
- No. of series: 1
- No. of episodes: 30

Production
- Running time: 60mins (inc. adverts)
- Production company: ITV Studios

Original release
- Network: ITV
- Release: 26 September – 4 November 2011

Related
- ITV Food

There's No Taste Like Home is a British daytime cookery show that was part of the ITV Food category on ITV in 2011.
