= Paul Hayes (antiques expert) =

English antiques expert and television presenter

Paul William Hayes
- Born: 4 August 1970 (age 56); Morecambe, Lancashire, England, UK
- Occupations: Antiques expert and television personality
- Spouse: Kathryn
- Children: James, David and Nathan

Paul William Hayes (born 4 August 1970) is an English antiques expert and television personality.

== Career ==
Hayes began trading Dinky Toys from the age of six. Aged 19, he followed his father into the antiques business. His first sale was that of an old television. He has previously owned an antiques shop in his home town of Morecambe, Lancashire, since the early 1990s. He also previously opened a new antiques showroom in Middleton which opened in the summer of 2011.

Hayes has appeared in the BBC's Bargain Hunt, Housecall and Cash in the Attic. He was also appointed by Crimewatch as their resident stolen-antiques expert, and in 2004 he presented the short-lived Star Sale. In the same year he released a book, titled Cash in the Attic: How to Make Money From Your Forgotten Treasures, on BBC Books.

Hayes presented Car Booty on BBC One. In 2005, when Cash in the Attic began occasional hour-long episodes, Hayes filled the role of host for the first half of the show, with regular host Alistair Appleton coming in for a second rummage around the house and the corresponding auction. Appleton nicknamed Hayes "Porcelain Paul", due to his affinity for ceramics. A new series of Cash in the Attic launched in 2022.

Hayes' other TV appearances include Ready Steady Cook, Richard & Judy, Trading Treasures, Great Food Live and The Genuine Article.

In October 2011 he revealed he had been in talks with the BBC about becoming the new presenter for Songs of Praise.

Hayes is the head of the department of silver and watches at The Swan auction room in Tetsworth, Oxfordshire.

== Personal life ==
Hayes is married to Kathryn, with whom he has three children.

As demonstrated in episodes of Cash in the Attic, Hayes is a lover of tea; is a budding pianist; has a fear of snakes and is a fan of Elvis Presley.
