= Wall of Fame (game show) =

- Genre: Comedy panel game
- Presented by: David Walliams
- Starring: Jack Dee; Kate Garraway; Tamara Ecclestone; Sara Pascoe; Andrew Maxwell
- Country of origin: United Kingdom
- Original language: English
- No. of series: 1
- No. of episodes: 10 (list of episodes)

Production
- Running time: 30–60 minutes (inc. adverts)
- Production company: CPL Productions

Original release
- Network: Sky1
- Release: 17 June – 19 August 2011

Wall of Fame is a British comedy panel game that was first broadcast on Sky1 in 2011. It is hosted by Little Britain star David Walliams and features Jack Dee, Kate Garraway, with Tamara Ecclestone for the first two episodes then Sara Pascoe took over from episode three, and Andrew Maxwell as regular panellists, alongside two weekly guests.

== Premise ==
The premise of the show is the two teams of panellists discuss the week's top 25 most talked about celebrities in the UK.

== Episode list ==
The coloured backgrounds denote the result of each of the shows:

– indicates Kate and Andrew's team won
– indicates Jack and Tamara's/Sara's team won
– indicates the game ended in a draw

Episode	First broadcast	Kate and Andrew's guest	Jack and Tamara's guest	Scores
1x01	17 June 2011	Micky Flanagan	Tulisa Contostavlos	3–0
1x02	24 June 2011	Billie Piper	Sally Bercow	4–5
Episode	First broadcast	Kate and Andrew's guest	Jack and Sara's guest	Scores
1x03	1 July 2011	Bear Grylls	Gabby Logan	2–4
1x04	8 July 2011	Jimmy Carr	Terry Wogan, Sally Lindsay (Note: Pascoe did not attend the recording of this episode.)	3–2
1x05	15 July 2011	Jack Whitehall	Kym Marsh	6–5
1x06	22 July 2011	Eamonn Holmes	Holly Walsh	5–5
1x07	29 July 2011	Robert Winston	Anton du Beke	3–2
1x08	5 August 2011	Jessica Hynes	Stacey Solomon	2–6
1x09	12 August 2011	Compilation episode - "The Unseen Bits"		—N/a
1x10	19 August 2011	Compilation episode - "The Best of..."		—N/a
