= Too Many Cooks (TV series) =

- Genre: Cookery
- Presented by: Kate Garraway; Jeni Barnett
- Judges: Brian Turner; James Martin; Gino D'Acampo; Richard Phillips; Alex MacKay
- Country of origin: United Kingdom
- Original language: English
- No. of series: 2
- No. of episodes: 35

Production
- Running time: 60 minutes (Series 1); 45 minutes (Series 2)
- Production company: Granada

Original release
- Network: ITV
- Release: 1 November 2004 – 4 September 2005

Related
- ITV Day; ITV Food

Too Many Cooks is a British cookery competition that aired on ITV from 1 November 2004 to 4 September 2005 and hosted by Kate Garraway for the first series and Jeni Barnett for the second series. The judges for the first series were Brian Turner and James Martin, while the judges for the second series were Gino D'Acampo, Richard Phillips and Alex MacKay.

== Format ==
Four teams of two amateur chefs each competitively cook for three judges. Each team cooks a specified starter, a main course, and a pudding. One team is eliminated after each course, leaving two teams to compete at the pudding stage.

== Transmissions ==
Series	Start date	End date	Episodes
1	1 November 2004	12 November 2004	10
2	6 June 2005	1 July 2005	25
2	30 August 2005	4 September 2005	25

== Reception ==
TV critic Melinda Houston wrote in The Age about the second series, "a large part of the entertainment comes from watching the judge, the rather bemused Italian chef Gino d'Acampo, examining what the cooks have done with a series of straightforward recipes."
