= John Burton-Race =

British chef (born 1957)

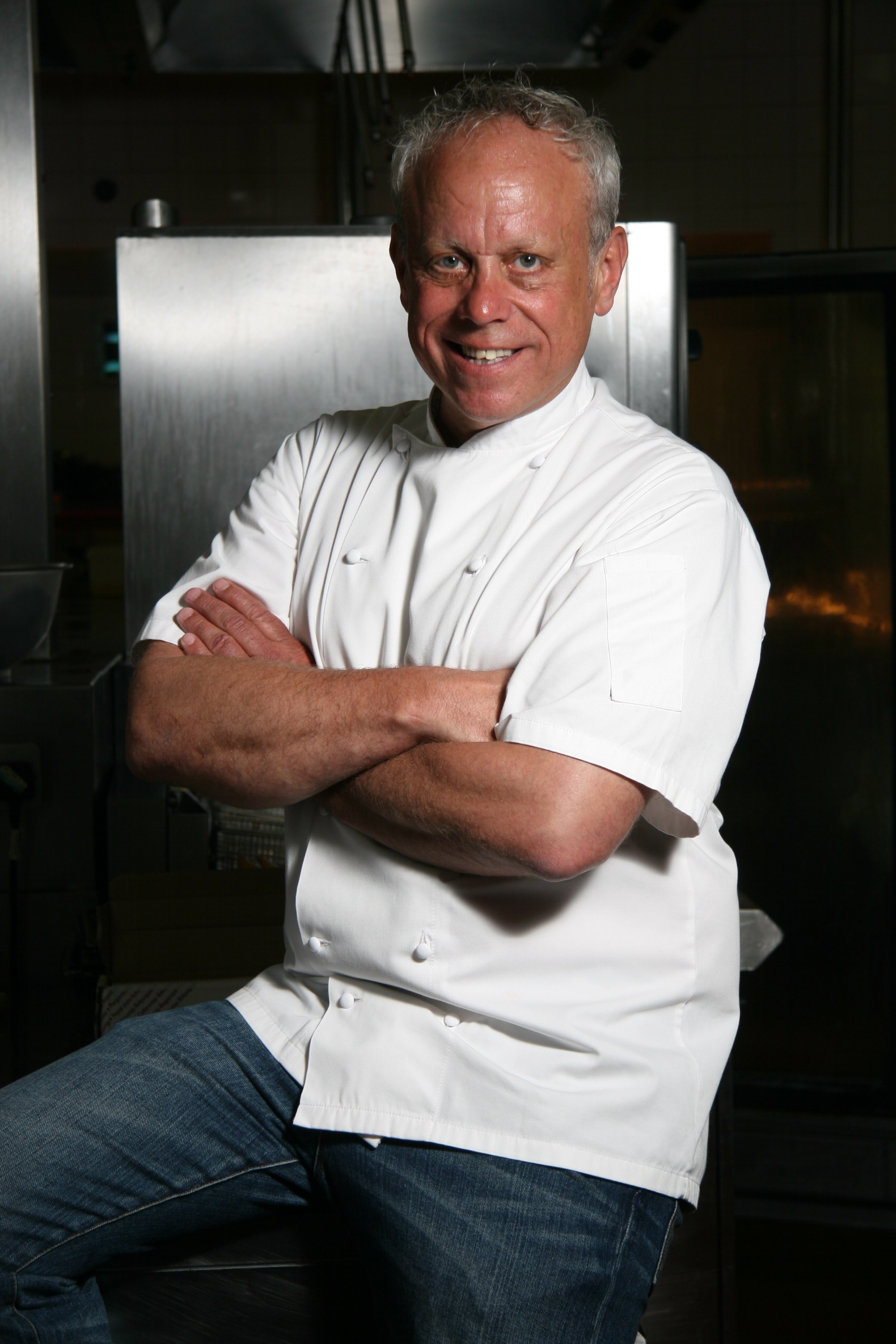
- Burton-Race in 2009
- Born: John William Burton-Race; 1 May 1957 (age 69); Singapore
- Education: Saint Mary's College, Southampton
- Spouse(s): Christine Burton-Race (divorced); 2 children Kim Burton-Race (divorced); 2 children; Susan Burton-Race ; 1 child
- Culinary career
- Rating
- Michelin stars (no longer held)
- Television shows
- French Leave; Return of the Chef; Great British Menu; Kitchen Criminals; Britain's Best Dish; I'm a Celebrity...Get Me Out of Here! Taste The Nation; Let's Dance for Comic Relief; Put Your Money Where Your Mouth Is; Daily Cooks Challenge
- Awards
- 1987 first Michelin star 1987 until 2002 2 Michelin stars 1990-94 Good Food Guide 5/5; 1991 Egon Ronay 'Restaurant of the Year'; 1992 One Silver and two Gold Medals at Madrid Euro Olympics and Gold for overall 'European Chef of the Year'; 1994 Grand Prix de L’art de la Cuisine International Academy of Gastronomy; 1996 Catey Awards 'Chef of the Year'; Acorn Award Caterer and Hotel Keeper Magazine; Ackerman Guide 'Best in Britain Award'; Toques Gault Millau 18/20; 5 AA Rosettes; Egon Ronay 3*; 2005-06 AA 'Restaurant of the Year' (England); 2005-10 1 Michelin star and 3 AA Rosettes
- Website: www.johnburtonrace.co.uk

John William Burton-Race (born 1 May 1957) is a British chef, television personality and celebrity chef, made famous by the Channel 4 series French Leave and its sequel Return of the Chef and I'm a Celebrity...Get Me Out of Here!.

== Early life ==
Burton-Race was born in Singapore, raised by his mother and stepfather, who was a United Nations official. Burton-Race's biological father, whom he contacted as an adult, was a geologist. Burton-Race spent his early years travelling, allowing him to experience food from all round the world. He attended St Mary's College, Southampton.

== Career ==
Between 1983 and 2002, he held positions at various restaurants in the South of England, including Le Manoir aux Quat' Saisons, Oxford; the L'Ortolan restaurant in Berkshire; and in 2000, he took over The Landmark London hotel, winning two Michelin stars. In 1995 Burton Race won a Catey Award.

After a 1990 television debut in Masterchef, Burton Race served as food consultant for the BBC Lenny Henry series Chef!. French Leave saw Burton Race move to France in 2002. He returned to the UK to purchase and run the restaurant/hotel The New Angel in Dartmouth, a seaside town in Devon. It was awarded a Michelin star in 2005.

In 2006, Burton-Race lost to Michael Caines when the pair were challenged to represent the South West of England in the BBC television series Great British Menu. In 2007, he became a mentor on BBC cooking show Kitchen Criminals, and a judge of ITV cooking show Britain's Best Dish. He was one of three judges on the daytime food show Britain's Best Dish (2007–2011), alongside Jilly Goolden and Ed Baines.

In spring 2009, he appeared as a mentor on the ITV show Taste The Nation, a contestant on the BBC Two show Put Your Menu Where Your Mouth Is, and a contestant on Let's Dance for Comic Relief, dancing to Michael Jackson's Thriller. In summer 2009, Burton-Race appeared on the ITV daytime food show Daily Cooks Challenge.

Burton-Race left The New Angel in 2010 to join Unitas, and has since consulted for various restaurants, hotels and food chains. In 2012 Burton-Race joined Adams Foods as brand ambassador and executive development Chef for Kerrygold and Pilgrims Choice.

He entered the retail market with the brand 'Cooked by John Burton-Race' which launched in August 2013.

In 2013, he competed in the new edition of BBC One series Put your Menu where your Mouth is, and filmed reality series Celebrity Super Spa for Channel 5.

As of 2017, Burton-Race is heading the brasserie and terrace restaurant team at the refurbished Grosvenor Hotel in Torquay Devon, recently renamed John Burton-Race Restaurant with Rooms, which has been awarded two AA Rosettes. In August 2018, Burton-Race announced via his Twitter account that he was leaving the Richardson Hotel Group and would be departing from the John Burton-Race Restaurant with Rooms and was seeking new adventures.

=== I'm a Celebrity ===
In November 2007, he appeared in ITV's I'm a Celebrity...Get Me Out of Here! During the series, he had a number of severe falling outs with fellow contestant Lynne Franks, as the two of them had such opposite and extreme personalities. He was also the camp's main cook, and disliked fellow contestant Janice Dickinson's refusal to eat certain types of meat, such as kangaroo, crocodile and possum. Burton-Race was voted out of I'm a Celebrity by the public on 24 November, the fifth person to leave the 2007 series. During his final chat with presenters Ant & Dec, he explained that as a chef, he had a very open mind with trying new types of food, and that was why he disliked Dickinson's refusal to eat the food he had prepared.

== Personal life ==
Burton-Race has been married three times, and has five children:

- Marie-Christine (1978-1997): two children, Naomi Burton-Race and Maximillian Burton-Race.
- Kim (1996-2007): started an affair, after meeting at a friend's wedding in the Caribbean. They have two children together, and lived in a Georgian rectory in the village of Ashprington, near Totnes, with Kim's four children from her previous marriage.
- Susan (2005–present)

As part of a divorce settlement with Kim, Burton-Race was required to liquidate his assets, including the family home and The New Angel. Kim closed The New Angel on 27 November 2007 whilst Burton-Race was in the Australian Outback on ITV programme I'm a Celebrity...Get Me Out of Here. The New Angel reopened a year later, after being bought by a friend, with Burton-Race back in charge. Despite previous press reports of assets over £3 million, Kim and John Burton-Race each declared themselves bankrupt in 2009.
