= Car Booty =

British television programme

- Presented by: Lorne Spicer
- Starring: Mark Franks; Paul Hayes
- Composer: Kevin Leavy
- Country of origin: United Kingdom
- No. of series: 11

Production
- Running time: 30 / 45 minutes
- Production company: Leopard Films

Original release
- Network: BBC One
- Release: 26 April 2004 – 15 October 2010

Car Booty is a British television programme that aired on BBC One from 26 April 2004 to 15 October 2010.

== Format ==
The concept of the show is for a family or group who are in need of funds to sell items from around their home at a car boot sale, in order to raise the desired amount of money. There are times when there is an antique too good for the boot sale, so coverage of a family member taking an item to a specialist is often shown.

== Transmissions ==
| Series | Start date | End date | Episodes |
|---|---|---|---|
| 1 | 26 April 2004 | ?? | ?? |
| 2 | ?? | ?? | ?? |
| 3 | ?? | ?? | ?? |
| 4 | ?? | ?? | ?? |
| 5 | ?? | ?? | ?? |
| 6 | 24 April 2006 | ?? | ?? |
| 7 | 4 September 2006 | ?? | ?? |
| 8 | 18 December 2006 | ?? | ?? |
| 9 | 16 April 2007 | 7 August 2007 | 25 |
| 10 | 1 September 2008 | 19 September 2008 | 15 |
| 11 | 2 November 2009 | 15 October 2010 | 15 |
