= Hambleton Bakery =

Bakery in Rutland, England

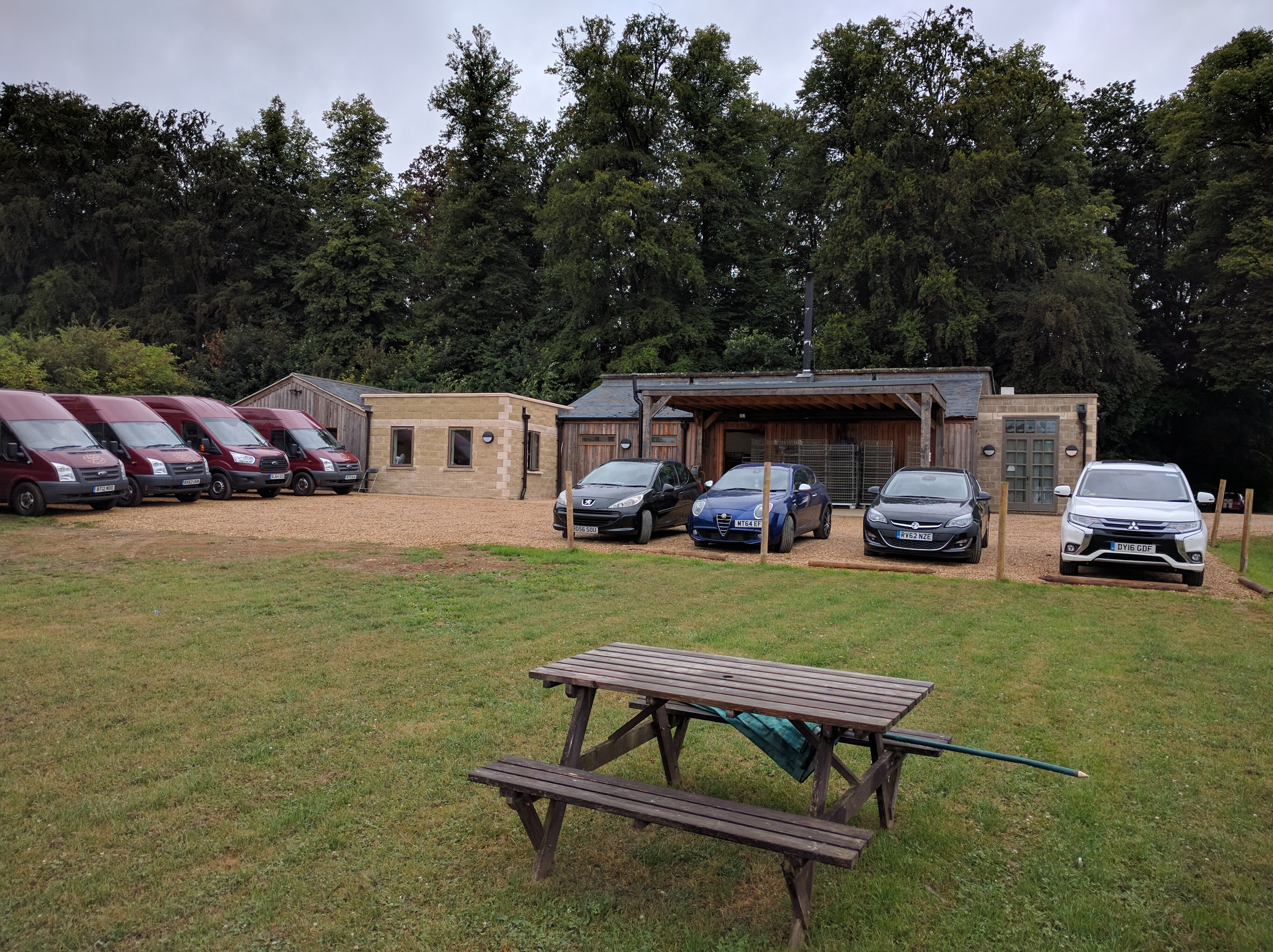

Hambleton Bakery is a bakery in Rutland which bakes and sells bread and cakes made in an artisanal way. It was founded in Exton to bake bread for Hambleton Hall but has expanded so that the original bakery now produces cakes and savouries while its bread is baked in Stretton. These are now sold in a chain of cafés and shops in the area, including Market Harborough, Oakham, Oundle, Stamford and West Bridgford.

In 2012, the bakery won the competition, Britain's Best Bakery.
