= Gino D'Acampo =

Italian-British celebrity chef and media personality (born 1976)

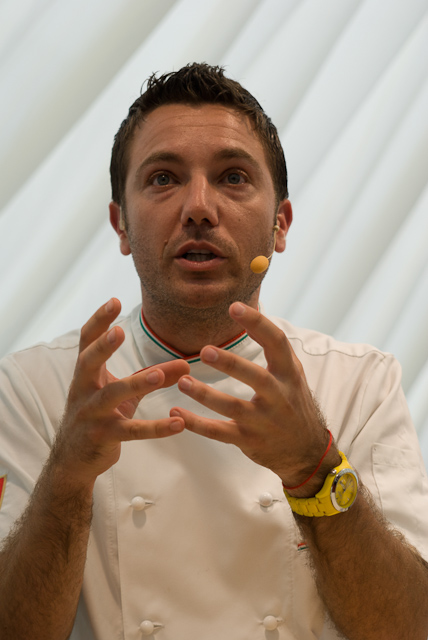
- D'Acampo in 2011
- Born: Gennaro D'Acampo; 17 July 1976 (age 50); Torre del Greco, Italy
- Occupations: Celebrity chef; television personality; writer
- Employer: ITV
- Television: This Morning; I'm a Celebrity...Get Me Out of Here! Let's Do Lunch; Gino's Italian Escape; Celebrity Juice; Gino's Win Your Wish List; Family Fortunes
- Spouse: Jessica Stellina Morrison (m. 2002)
- Children: 3
- Website: ginodacampo.com

Gennaro Sheffield "Gino" D'Acampo (born Gennaro D'Acampo; 17 July 1976) is an Italian celebrity chef, television personality and writer based in the United Kingdom. He first came to widespread public attention as the winner of the ninth series of the ITV reality show I'm a Celebrity...Get Me Out of Here! in 2009, and has since been a regular chef on ITV's This Morning and the presenter of several food and travel series, including There's No Taste Like Home and Gino's Italian Escape.

Over the years, he has built his brand across multiple cookery and travel-series television programmes, authored numerous cookbooks, and developed a portfolio of Italian restaurants in partnership with UK hotels and leisure venues.

== Career ==
In 1995, aged 19, D'Acampo moved to London to work in The Orchard Restaurant, Hampstead, London and the Cambio Restaurant in Guildford, Surrey.

D'Acampo co-owns Bontà Italia Ltd, a supplier of Italian ingredients, and has a career in the development of ready meals, beginning with the Tesco Finest range. This experience led to his first engagement as a guest on Great Food Live on UKTV Food and the start of his television career.

In 2009, D'Acampo was crowned King of the Jungle in the ninth series of I'm a Celebrity...Get Me Out of Here!. After the show, D'Acampo and fellow contestant Stuart Manning were charged by the Australian Federal Police with animal cruelty for killing and cooking a rat on the show. However, the charges were later dropped after ITV accepted responsibility for the incident.

D'Acampo has regularly appeared on the ITV series This Morning. He launched his first iPhone app, Gino D'Acampo – Eating Italian, in 2010.

From 2011 until 2014, D'Acampo and Melanie Sykes presented the daytime cookery programme Let's Do Lunch with Gino & Mel. The show aired for four series and three Christmas series from 2012 to 2014. D'Acampo hosts a Sunday afternoon cookery and discussion show on LBC 97.3. In 2011, D'Acampo presented the daytime cookery series There's No Taste Like Home for thirty episodes.

In 2013, D'Acampo launched a chain of restaurants with his name followed by My Pasta Bar or My Restaurant. His first pasta bar opened on Fleet Street in July 2013. There are also restaurants in Leadenhall Market, Bishopsgate, Euston railway station, The Manchester Corn Exchange, Harrogate, Camden Town (Gino D'Acampo My Restaurant)

From 2013 until 2020, D'Acampo presented seven series of Gino's Italian Escape on ITV. A cookery book was released to accompany each series.

In autumn 2014, D'Acampo filled in as a team captain for Holly Willoughby on the ITV2 panel show Celebrity Juice, while she went on maternity leave. D'Acampo also appeared in the following series in spring 2015, this time as a regular panellist. D'Acampo returned to Celebrity Juice in September 2015 where he replaced Fearne Cotton as team captain whilst she was on maternity leave.

In 2015 and 2017, D'Acampo toured the UK with a live stage show called Gino's Italian Escape to accompany his television series. He visited cities including Bath, Newcastle and Margate. In May 2018, it was confirmed that Channel 5 had picked up Win Your Wish List for its Saturday night schedule, with D'Acampo as host. The show is now called Gino's Win Your Wish List. The revival is produced by Stellify Media.

From 2018, D'Acampo co-starred with Gordon Ramsay and Fred Sirieix in the ITV food and travel series Gordon, Gino and Fred: Road Trip. The factual entertainment show ran for five series and a number of festive specials until 2023.

Following a brief pause in projects during early 2024, D'Acampo resumed smaller projects away from UK television. He fronted the pilot for a cookery competition Spaghetti Wars in July 2025, and opened a new restaurant in Malta. He also appeared at the Taste of Abu Dhabi festival in the United Arab Emirates.

== Books ==
- Fantastico! (2007)
- Buonissimo! (2008)
- The Italian Diet (2010)
- Gino's Pasta (2011)
- Italian Home Baking (2011)
- Gino's Italian Escape (2013)
- Gino's Italian Escape: A Taste of the Sun (2014)
- Gino's Veg Italia! 100 Quick and Easy Vegetarian Recipes (2015)
- Gino's Italian Escape: Islands in the Sun (2015)
- Gino's Hidden Italy (2016)
- Gino's Healthy Italian for Less (2017)
- Gino's Italian Coastal Escape (2017)
- Gino's Italian Adriatic Escape (2018)
- Gino's Italian Express (2019)
- Gino's Italian Family Adventure (2021)cc
- Gino's Italy: Like Mamma Used to Make (2022)
- Gino's Air Fryer Cookbook: Italian Classics Made Easy (2024)

== Controversies ==
=== Conviction ===
In 1998, D'Acampo was convicted of burgling singer Paul Young's London home and served two years in prison. D'Acampo has since apologised to Young, who accepted and suggested that D'Acampo could invite him to dinner in his restaurant.

=== Allegations of inappropriate conduct ===
In 2025, ITV News reported on various allegations of inappropriate and intimidating behaviour by D'Acampo spanning more than 12 years from people who have worked with him. He told ITV News he "firmly denied" the allegations, claiming they were "deeply upsetting".

ITV removed all of D'Acampo's upcoming shows from its TV schedule following the report. Later in 2025, D'Acampo claimed to be resuming a selection of television projects including a cookery competition pilot for Spaghetti Wars and the travel series An Italian in Malta, broadcast on ITV.

== Personal life ==
D'Acampo lives with his wife Jessica Stellina Morrison, whom he married in 2002. He has three children.

In 1998, D'Acampo was convicted of burgling singer Paul Young's London home and served two years in prison. D'Acampo has apologised to Young, who accepted and suggested that D'Acampo could invite him to dinner in his restaurant.

In 2015, D'Acampo legally adopted the middle name "Sheffield" by deed poll while appearing on an episode of Celebrity Juice in exchange for bonus points on the show.

D'Acampo is a fan of the rugby union team Leicester Tigers.

== Filmography ==
=== Television ===
Year(s)	Title	Role	Notes
2004–2005	Too Many Cooks	Judge	2 series
2007	Soapstar Superchef	Judge	1 series
2009	I'm a Celebrity...Get Me Out of Here!	Contestant	Series 9 winner
2009–2025	This Morning	Regular chef	
2011	There's No Taste Like Home	Presenter	1 series
2011–2014	Let's Do Lunch with Gino & Mel	Co-presenter	4 series
2012–2014	Let's Do Christmas with Gino & Mel	Co-presenter	3 series
2013–2020	Gino's Italian Escape	Presenter	7 series
2014–2019	Celebrity Juice	Regular panellist/team captain	
2015	Keith Lemon's Back T'Future Tribute	Emmett Brown	One-off special
2017	Gordon, Gino & Fred's Great Christmas Roast	Cook	One-off special
2018–2021	Gino's Win Your Wish List	Presenter	3 series
2018–2023	Gordon, Gino and Fred: Road Trip	Co-presenter	4 series
2020–2023	Family Fortunes	Presenter	2 series
2021	Gino's Italian Family Adventure	Presenter	Seven-part series
2022	Gino's Italy: Like Mamma Used to Make	Presenter	Six-part series
2022	Gino's Cooking Up Love	Host	Cookery dating show
2022	Gino's Italian Christmas Feast	Presenter	One-off special
2023	Gino's Italy: Secrets of the South	Presenter	Six-part series+one Christmas special
2024	Gino & Fred: Emission Impossible	Himself	Two-part series; also featuring Fred Sirieix

=== Film ===
Year	Title	Role	Notes
2021	Luca	Eugenio	Voice role, UK release only

Preceded by Joe Swash	I'm a Celebrity...Get Me Out of Here! Winner & King of the Jungle; 2009	Succeeded by Stacey Solomon
