= Jeni Barnett =

English TV presenter

Jeni Barnett (born 24 March 1949 in London) is an English TV presenter.

== Early life ==
Barnett grew up in Borehamwood.

== Television career ==
As an actress, Barnett appeared on several TV shows, including Revolting Women (BBC2, 1981) and Doctors. She has also been a panellist on ITV's Loose Women and Five's The Wright Stuff, and was a long-time presenter of the children's TV series You and Me.

Barnett became well known after appearing on British breakfast station TV-am as a weekend presenter.

Between 2002 and 2007, she was host of UKTV Food's flagship food show, Great Food Live (previously known as Good Food Live) and its spin-offs, Great Food Bites and Great Food Live Extra. In 2004/2005, Barnett also hosted the second series of the ITV cookery show, Too Many Cooks.

In December 2018, Barnett surprised Gino D'Acampo as a guest Pizza Delivery lady in the Midnight Gameshow in the fourth series of Michael McIntyre's Big Show.

== Radio presenter ==
On 16 June 2007 Barnett presented her first radio programme on LBC 97.3, when she stood in for Chris Hawkins on Saturday afternoon. Barnett soon returned to the air filling in for more presenters, including Jim Davis' Lifestyle show. As part of a new Sunday schedule she was given a new 2-hour programme talking about food.

A further change on 7 January 2008 saw Barnett move to weekday afternoons, 1 to 4 pm, as part of the new weekday line up. The programme is a topical debate featuring aspects of news and views, in which the public are encouraged to call in with their views.

Barnett continued to present the Sunday Food programme as well as the new weekday afternoon programme until 20 January 2008 when Bill Buckley replaced her on Sundays so she could concentrate on the weekday programme. Her weekday programme ended in September 2010.

Between January 2011 and September 2013, she presented a Sunday morning show on BBC London 94.9, and occasionally stands in for Allison Ferns and Danny Pike on BBC Sussex.

In 2014/2015 she occasionally covered for Julia George on BBC Radio Kent’s mid-morning programme.

== 2009 MMR vaccine controversy ==
In a show broadcast on 7 January 2009, Barnett's topics included the MMR vaccine. The discussion attracted criticism of its accuracy and possible negative influence on public health by doctor and journalist Ben Goldacre, who described the show as "irresponsible, ill-informed, and ignorant". After the broadcast, Barnett admitted on her blog that she "did not have the facts to hand ... As a responsible broadcaster I should have been better prepared" when she discussed her claims with medical professionals who questioned her statements.

Barnett's broadcast resulted in a large number complaints being made to Ofcom. Based on the inclusion of alternative viewpoints from those expressed by Barnett, namely callers that included medical professionals criticising Barnett's statements, Ofcom's final ruling was that the broadcast did not violate rules against misleading portrayals of factual matters or undue prominence to minority views and opinions on matters of political or industrial controversy.
