= Fred Sirieix =

French maître d'hôtel (born 1972)

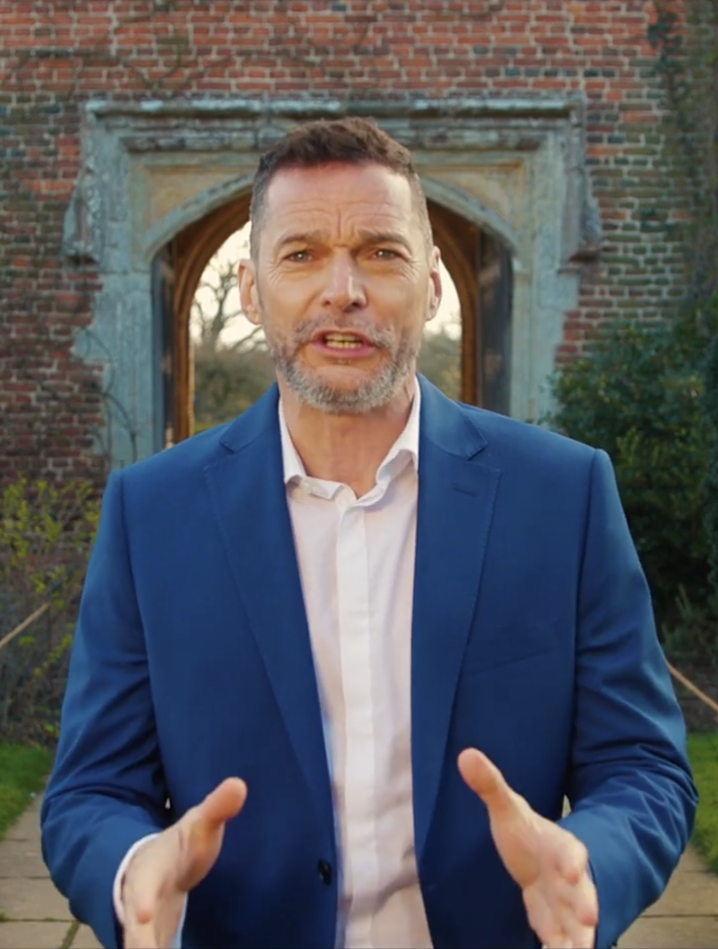
- Sirieix in 2023
- Born: Frédéric Sirieix; 27 January 1972 (age 54); Limoges, France
- Occupation: Maître d'hôtel
- Employers: Channel 4; BBC; ITV
- Known for: First Dates; Million Pound Menu; I'm a Celebrity...Get Me Out of Here!
- Spouse: (m. 2025)
- Children: 2, including Andrea
- Website: fredsirieix.com

Frédéric Sirieix (pronounced [siʁjɛks], see-ree-ecks; born 27 January 1972) is a French maître d'hôtel and television personality based in the United Kingdom, best known for appearing on Channel 4's First Dates, and BBC Two's Million Pound Menu. Sirieix grew up in Limoges, France and trained to work in front of house in a Michelin-starred restaurant in France before working at La Tante Claire in London. Until 2019, he was the general manager of Michelin-starred restaurant Galvin at Windows at the London Hilton.

Sirieix is the founder of National Waiters Day, the training tool the Art of Service, and the Galvin Cup and Galvin's Chance charities. He helped to launch the Right Course, which teaches prisoners about the service industry, and has released a book called First Dates: The Art of Love and a music track, "La Vie Continue". He has been featured in an ITV show, with Gordon Ramsay and Gino D'Acampo, entitled Gordon, Gino and Fred: Road Trip (2019), and Remarkable Places to Eat on BBC Two (2019).

== Early life ==
Sirieix was brought up in Limoges, France. He has said he is of Irish ancestry. His parents both worked in healthcare and he says they inspired him to work in the service industry: "The conversation around the dinner table was all about patient care. It was about making sure people had a good experience."

He has described how, as a teenager, he "loved the idea of living his life in [the English language]" and of living in England.

== Career ==
He trained at a Michelin-starred restaurant in France, before moving to London restaurant La Tante Claire where he worked as a chef de rang (head waiter). Following this, he worked at Le Gavroche, Sartoria and Brasserie Roux. He was the general manager of Galvin at Windows, a Michelin-starred restaurant in the London Hilton hotel on Park Lane for 14 years, until December 2019.

On Christmas Day 2012, Sirieix launched National Waiters Day to celebrate the work of front of house staff and attract people into the profession. In 2011, he launched The Art of Service - a board game for teaching customer service in hotels and restaurants. Sirieix is also involved in charity work, creating a cocktail competition called the Galvin Cup, which awards young bartenders. He also created the charity Galvin's Chance, which supports underprivileged young front of house staff in London and Scotland's best hotels, restaurants and bars. In 2017, Sirieix, along with Novus, launched the Right Course, which remodels prison staff restaurants to operate as high street restaurants to teach prisoners cooking and about other aspects of service industry.

=== Television ===
Sirieix is the Maître d' on Channel 4's First Dates, deciding to be part of the show because "it sounded fun and you have to consider any opportunity. I looked carefully at it and became sure it was a good programme at heart." He was also Maître d' on the First Dates spin-off show, First Dates Abroad. In addition to First Dates, Sirieix, along with celebrity chef Michel Roux Jr, co-hosted BBC Two's Michel Roux's Service. In 2012, he appeared on BBC One's The Apprentice whilst the programme filmed at Galvin at Windows. In 2017, he appeared in Channel 4's Tried and Tasted: The Ultimate Shopping List.

In 2018, he presented Million Pound Menu, a new show for BBC Two. In December 2017, he appeared in ITV's Gordon, Gino and Fred's Great Christmas Roast, alongside Gordon Ramsay and Gino D'Acampo.

In 2019, he hosted the CBBC series Step Up to the Plate with Allegra McEvedy where they tested eight young people in each episode to see if they had the skills to run their own restaurant. A second series was broadcast in 2021.

In 2019, he presented a series on BBC Two entitled Remarkable Places to Eat, in which he was taken by chefs to their favourite restaurants in different cities.

In 2019, he co-presented the Channel 4 series Snackmasters with comedian Jayde Adams, in which two haute cuisine chefs are challenged with recreating a well-known brand of snack or fast food product, such as KFC's Zinger burger or Monster Munch crisps, from scratch. Two further series were broadcast in 2020 and 2021.

In June 2022, he and his fiancée appeared in Channel 4 series Celebrity Gogglebox.

During August and September 2023, Sirieix presented the reality series Ultimate Wedding Planner; which aired on BBC Two.

He participated in the twenty-third series of I'm a Celebrity...Get Me Out of Here!. He clashed with fellow contestant Nigel Farage about Brexit and criticised Josie Gibson for her cooking skills. Sirieix was third to be voted out of camp.

In December 2024 Sirieix appeared alongside Gino D'Acampo in Gino & Fred: Emission Impossible, an ITV series.

Sirieix presented the travelogue series Tour de Fred: Northern Ireland and Tour de Fred Ireland: Part Deux in 2025 and 2026, respectively.

In May 2025 Sirieix featured in the BBC TV programme Who Do You Think You Are?

=== Other ventures ===
In 2015, Sirieix released a music track with Mark King from the band Level 42 and rapper XO MAN called "La Vie Continue" ("Life Goes On"). Sirieix describes it as "a song about love, loss and everything in between".

In 2016, Sirieix released a book called First Dates: The Art of Love.

In 2021, he danced with Dianne Buswell for the 2021 Strictly Come Dancing Christmas Special.

In September 2024, Sirieix released a book titled Seriously British.

== Awards ==
In 2010, Sirieix was nominated for the Cateys manager of the year award, winning it three years later in 2013. In October 2011, he won the National Restaurant Awards' Personality of the Year for his charity work and promoting the hospitality profession. He was voted Educator of the Year in 2012 at the Imbibe awards and in March 2014, he was awarded an honorary degree from the University of West London.

== Personal life ==
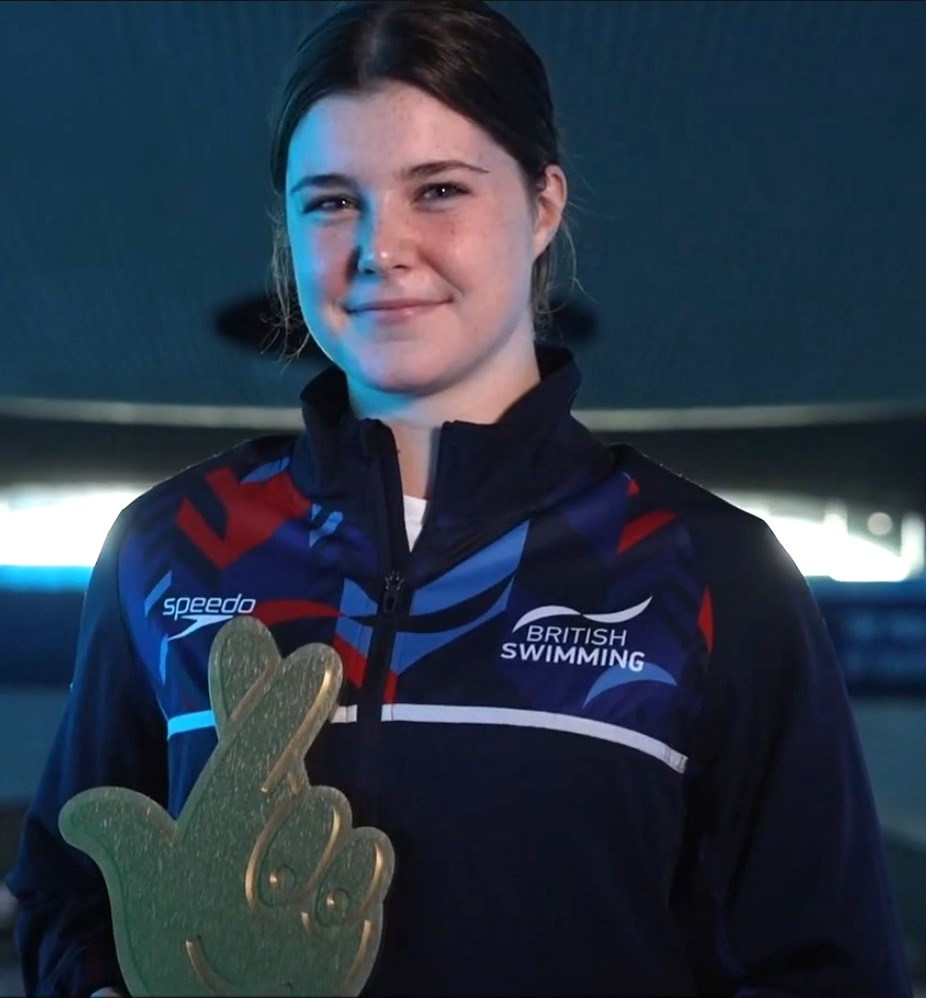
Daughter Andrea Spendolini-Sirieix in 2022

Sirieix lives with his Jamaican wife, identified publicly only by the nickname "Fruitcake". His two children from a previous relationship live in Peckham. His daughter is professional British diver Andrea Spendolini-Sirieix. He was in the crowd to witness her win gold in the Women's 10m Platform at the 2022 Commonwealth Games in Birmingham. When Andrea and Lois Toulson won bronze in the Women's 10m Synchro at the 2024 Paris Olympics, Sirieix interviewed them for the BBC and participated in the coverage of the closing ceremony.

In February 2025, Sirieix married his long-term partner in a ceremony at Pattoo Castle in Negril, Jamaica.
