= Gordon, Gino and Fred: Road Trip =

British travel and food show

- Genre: Travel and Food
- Starring: Gordon Ramsay; Gino D'Acampo; Fred Sirieix
- Country of origin: United Kingdom
- Original language: English
- No. of series: 4
- No. of episodes: 11 (+ 5 specials)

Production
- Executive producers: Luke Campbell; Lisa Edwards; Gordon Ramsay; Steph Weatherill
- Running time: 60 minutes (inc. adverts); 75 minutes (specials) (inc. adverts)
- Production companies: Humble Pie Productions; Studio Gordon Ramsay

Original release
- Network: ITV1, ITV4
- Release: 11 October 2018 – 4 September 2023

Gordon, Gino and Fred: Road Trip is a British travel and food show that originally aired on the ITV channel in United Kingdom. In it, chefs Gordon Ramsay, Gino D'Acampo and maître d'hôtel Fred Sirieix visited various countries and cities, where they explored local culture and cuisine. It is a spin-off of the Christmas special Gordon, Gino & Fred's Great Christmas Roast, which aired on 21 December 2017. The first series premiered on 11 October 2018, the second series called Gordon Gino & Fred: American Road Trip premiered on 2 April 2020 and the third series called Gordon Gino & Fred Go Greek premiered 27 September 2021, to a shortened run of only two episodes. The fourth series called Gordon, Gino and Fred: Viva España! also consisted of only two episodes, debuting on 3 and 4 September 2023.

In some countries outside the United Kingdom the first series of the show is known as: Gordon, Gino & Fred: The Ultimate Road Trip.

On 10 December 2020, ITV commissioned a further three series and three Christmas specials of Gordon Gino and Fred: Road Trip; series 3 (2021) (6 x 60′), series 4 (2022) (8 x 60′), and series 5 (2023) (8 x 60′).

In March 2023, D'Acampo left the show, saying he would not film in a planned fifth series due to contract disputes and other commitments.

== Series overview ==
Series	Episodes	Originally released	
Series	Episodes	First released	Last released
1	3	11 October 2018	25 October 2018
Christmas Special (2019)		23 December 2019	
2	4	4 April 2020	23 April 2020
Christmas Special (2020)		16 December 2020	
3	2	28 September 2021	4 October 2021
Unseen Bits (2022)		15–16 December 2022	
4	2	3 September 2023	4 September 2023

== Episodes ==
=== Series 1 (2018) ===
No. overall	No. in series	Title	Produced by	Directed by	Original release date	Viewers (millions)
1	1	"The Italian Job"	Ben Jessop	Sam Campbell	11 October 2018	4.82
Gordon Ramsay, Gino D'Acampo and Fred Sirieix set off on a European adventure, organising a special ceremony in each of their home countries. They begin in Gino's homeland of Italy, where the chef's best friend is renewing his vows in four days' time. The trio jump in their camper van and start to collect the various ingredients they will need to feed the 50 guests. But despite the urgency of preparing a menu, Gino insists they stop for lunch in his home town of Naples and takes them to the oldest pizzeria in town.
2	2	"The French Connection"	Ben Jessop	Sam Campbell	18 October 2018	5.32
Gordon Ramsay, Gino D'Acampo and Fred Sirieix's European adventure brings them to Fred's cherished homeland of France, where an old friend has asked him to host an oyster festival in Arcachon on the Atlantic coast. As the trio set off across France in search of ingredients, Fred is determined to show his companions the best his country has to offer, with highlights including the famous nudist beaches of the French Riviera - where Gordon attracts unwanted attention - an unruly pony and Fred demonstrating his questionable musical skills.
3	3	"The Highland Fling"	Ben Jessop	Sam Campbell	25 October 2018	5.12
The final destination on the trio's culinary adventure is Gordon Ramsay's birthplace of Scotland, where the chef is planning a feast for the chief of Clan Ramsay and his esteemed friends. If the meal is successful Gordon will be officially welcomed into the clan, so he is desperate for everything to be perfect. The trio set out to tour the country in search of ingredients, including Scottish beef and scallops, but also find time to take part in the Highland Games and dress up like real Scotsmen - with Gino taking a particular shine to his sporran.

=== Christmas Special (2019) (Morocco) ===
No. overall	Title	Produced by	Directed by	Original release date	Viewers (millions)
5	"Christmas Road Trip: Three Unwise Men"	Emma Taylor	Ben Archard	23 December 2019	4.59
Gordon Ramsay, Gino D'Acampo and Fred Sirieix reconvene after their European travels to rediscover the spirit of Christmas, heading to the unlikely festive destination of Morocco to see what the North African country has to offer in the way of culture, cuisine and adventure. The trio journey through the Agafay desert by camel, on through the mountains and end up deep in Marrakesh's marketplace and souks, with their trip culminating in a festive feast inspired by their travels, the people they have met and the experiences they have had.

=== Series 2: American Road Trip (2020) ===
No. overall	No. in series	Title	Produced by	Directed by	Original release date	Viewers (millions)
6	1	"The Three Amigos"	Emma Taylor	Ben Archard	4 April 2020	7.65
Having previously toured their own countries, Gordon Ramsay, Gino D'Acampo and Fred Sirieix now hit the highways of the United States - although in the first episode, they are in Mexico, on a mission to taste the world's best breakfast. Along the way, the trio take part in a chili-eating competition, have a beach buggy race and watch some traditional Mexican wrestling - but it isn't long before they are persuaded to not take part.
7	2	"City Slickers"	Emma Taylor	Ben Archard	16 April 2020	6.93
Gordon Ramsay aims to show his companions that US food lives up to its reputation of being bigger and better as they travel from Nevada to Los Angeles. They begin in style with a helicopter ride about the Grand Canyon - although Gino is too nervous to appreciate the spectacle below him. Next up is a trout fishing trip contest in the Colorado River, followed by a burger in Las Vegas with a hefty price tag of $777 and a visit to a ranch where they have to round up herds of cattle on horseback. Finally, they hit Los Angeles, where they have a barbecue battle.
8	3	"Summer of Love"	Emma Taylor	Ben Archard	16 April 2020	7.14
Gordon Ramsay, Gino D'Acampo and Fred Sirieix head to San Francisco, the free-spirited capital of the United States. They start out by sampling the latest trends of using cannabis in cooking, which was legalised in California in 2018 - but as they enjoy a hippy afternoon tea, Gino overindulges and chaos ensues, especially when the next activity on the agenda is a session of goat yoga. Moving on, the trio dig for clams on the Pacific coast, take a hot-air ride to a vineyard and visit a factory in Chinatown where fortune cookies are made. It seems a competition is in order and so the travel companions see who can make the most cookies in 60 seconds.
9	4	"Brokeback Mountain"	Emma Taylor	Ben Archard	23 April 2020	6.91
For the final leg of their US jaunt, the trio arrive in Texas, a meat-lover's paradise where Gordon Ramsay is keen to introduce his companions to some of the best barbecue food known to man. In Lexington, Gordon turns lumberjack in an attempt to fell a dead oak - which is used to infuse ovens with wood smoke. There's a break for a bit of skinny dipping, before the trio fish go fishing, and stay in a strange cabin deep in the woods, surviving on beans and bourbon. They then hit the state capital of Austin, dressing as cowboys in the local bar and at the rodeo, before one last barbecue supper of slow-smoked beef brisket, pork ribs and spicy sausage.

=== Christmas Special (2020) (Finland) ===
No. overall	Title	Produced by	Directed by	Original release date	Viewers (millions)
10	"Desperately Seeking Santa"	Charlotte Woolley	Ben Archard	16 December 2020	6.62
After last year's trip to the unlikely festive destination of Morocco, Gordon Ramsay is determined to celebrate Christmas properly this year, arranging a trip to the ultimate winter wonderland of Lapland. Gino D'Acampo has a letter he wants to hand deliver to Santa from his daughter Mia, Fred is keen to witness the once-in-a-lifetime wonder of the Northern Lights and Gordon is eager that they all encounter the culinary delights of the country. But along the way, they face plenty of distractions, including ice swimming, saunas, snowmobiles and snowballing.

=== Series 3: Go Greek! (2021) ===
No. overall	No. in series	Title	Produced by	Directed by	Original release date	Viewers (millions)
11	1	"Mamma Mia!"	Charlotte Woolley	Ben Archard	28 September 2021	6.31
Gordon, Gino and Fred travel to Greece to immerse themselves in the culinary traditions and spectacular landscapes in the birthplace of a prosperous ancient civilization.
12	2	"Clash of the Titans"	Charlotte Woolley	Ben Archard	4 October 2021	5.94
The boys are in the Greek capital Athens in a vintage VW campervan. This is where high-concept cuisine originated and is still being re-invented.

=== Gordon, Gino and Fred: Unseen Bits (2022) ===
No. overall	No. in series	Title	Produced by	Directed by	Original release date	Viewers (millions)
13	1	""	TBA	Unknown	15 December 2022	N/A
14	2	""	TBA	Unknown	16 December 2022	N/A

=== Series 4: Gordon, Gino and Fred: Viva España! (2023) ===
No. overall	No. in series	Title	Produced by	Directed by	Original release date	Viewers (millions)
15	1	"La Vida Loca"	Stuart Fennimore	Tracey Smyth	3 September 2023	3.74
16	2	"Fiesta Forever"	Stuart Fennimore	Tracey Smyth	4 September 2023	3.05

== International edits & variations ==
=== USA ===
The Fox network has aired a number of compressed, special versions of the show, rebadged under the Gordon Ramsay's Road Trip umbrella. On 5 January 2021, Fox aired a condensed, two-hour compilation of series 2, American Road Trip, entitled Gordon Ramsay's American Road Trip. On 13 December 2021, they broadcast a similarly-compressed, two-hour version of series 1, entitled Gordon Ramsay's Road Trip: European Vacation, and on 14 December, a one-hour version of the 2020 Christmas special aired, entitled Gordon Ramsay's Road Trip: Christmas Vacation. On 4 January 2022, they broadcast Gordon Ramsay's Road Trip: Greek Vacation, adapted from the third series of the British run.

== Home media ==
Series 1 of Gordon, Gino and Fred: Road Trip (including the Christmas special: Christmas Road Trip: Three Unwise Men) was released on DVD in the United Kingdom on 4 November 2019. Series 2 DVD was released in the United Kingdom on 22 June 2020.
