= Alan Coxon =

British TV chef and television presenter

Alan Coxon is a TV chef and British television presenter. Coxon is a chef, culinary consultant, food archaeologist, TV presenter, author of five cookbooks, International judge, food and travel writer and product creator.

== Career ==
Coxon appeared on more than 1,250 food and travel TV shows including:

- Coxon's Kitchen College (Carlton Food Network)
- Gloria Hunnifords Open House (Channel 5)
- Ever Wondered About Food (BBC Two)
- UK Food live (Foodnetwork)
- The Mint (ITV)
- Coxon's Royal Feast (BBC Worldwide)
- Coxon's Sporting Feast ( BBC Worldwide)
- From Birmingham to Bombay (Food network)
- The Alan Titchmarsh show (ITV 1)

Coxon was invited by the United Kingdom's Prime Minister to support British gastronomy around the world, alongside cooking for VIPs at official engagements. He is an iTQi judge and consultant (International Taste and Quality Institute) of Brussels.

He was the host and a speaker at Chefs World Summit Monte Carlo 2016 and a TEDx speaker Monte Carlo 2016. He is a Member of the International Travel Writers Alliance and the World Gourmet association. He served as Judge of the iTQi (international Taste and Quality institute awards) (Brussels) 2010 - 2018, Judge of the international hotel awards, Judge of the "Tsingtao Legacy of Taste" "Best Chinese restaurant of the year" awards. He hosted the "Tsingtao Legacy of Taste" awards 2014, served as a Judge of the "Guild of British Food Writers" book awards 2012 and 2015, Judge of the International ecotrophilia awards Camden BRI 2014 and 2015.

Coxon consults and supports food and drink producers from around the world to enter and grow within the international retail market place, assists with achieving greater brand and product awareness.

== Recognition ==
- President of the iTi (International Taste Institute of Brussels), chefs jury https://www.taste-institute.com/
- President of CSF ( Chefs sans frontieres) a charity created and set up by Alan Coxon to help support small artisan food producers around the world that lose livelihoods due to natural disasters, helping to retain cultural gastronomy, traditional skills, food tourism and culinary heritage https://www.csfint.com
- European Ambassador of the Disciples of Escoffier International https://disciples-escoffier.com/en/
- Awarded Maitrise Escoffier award (2010)
- Disciple of Escoffier (Oct 2017)
- Honorary award for the Swiss chefs Association
- iTQi superior taste awards (Brussels) 2 gold stars
- iTQi Superior Taste Award (Brussels) for his unique Ale-gar(2011)
- Member of the British Royal Academy of Culinary Arts
- Member of British Guild of Food Writers,
