= Gino's Italian Escape =

- Genre: Food, Travel
- Presented by: Gino D'Acampo
- Country of origin: United Kingdom
- Original language: English
- No. of series: 7
- No. of episodes: 49

Production
- Running time: 30 minutes (inc. adverts)
- Production company: Multistory Media

Original release
- Network: ITV
- Release: 13 September 2013 – 16 January 2020

Related
- ITV Food

Gino's Italian Escape is a British documentary that aired on ITV between 2013 and 2020 and was presented by Gino D'Acampo. The series follows Gino as he explores some of Italy's best loved locations through some of the country's dishes notable to each region. After tasting local dishes with ingredients notable to that region, Gino prepares some dishes of his own.

== Transmissions ==
Series	Title	Start date	End date	Episodes
1	Gino's Italian Escape	13 September 2013	25 October 2013	6
2	Gino's Italian Escape: A Taste of the Sun	5 September 2014	10 October 2014	6
3	Gino's Italian Escape: Islands in the Sun	6 November 2015	1 January 2016	6
4	Gino's Italian Escape: Hidden Italy	10 October 2016	21 November 2016	7
5	Gino's Italian Coastal Escape	1 November 2017	20 December 2017	8
6	Gino's Italian Adriatic Escape	1 November 2018	20 December 2018	8
7	Gino's Italian Express	21 November 2019	16 January 2020	8

== 2015 Tour ==
In 2015, Gino toured the UK in Gino's Italian Escape: The Live Tour.

- Bath (29 October)
- York (30 October)
- Southend (1 November)
- Cambridge (2 November)
- Wolverhampton (3 November)
- Aberdeen (5 November)
- Newcastle (6 November)
- Ipswich (7 November)
- Margate (8 November)

== 2017 Tour ==
In 2017, Gino toured the UK in Gino's Italian Escape: The Live Tour.

- Newcastle (21 April)
- Grimsby (22 April)
- Cambridge (23 April)
- Leicester (24 April)
- Liverpool (25 April)
- Ipswich (27 April)
- Watford (28 April)
- Basingstoke (29 April)
- Cardiff (1 May)
- Sheffield (2 May)
- York (4 May)
- Dundee (5 May)
- Edinburgh (6 May)
- Nottingham (7 May)
- Aylesbury (8 May)
- Bath (9 May)
- Portsmouth (10 May)
- Guildford (11 May)

== 2018 Tour ==
In 2018, Gino toured the UK in Gino's Italian Escape: The Live Tour.

- Manchester (9 June)
- Leeds (10 June)
- Sheffield (11 June)
- Bath (12 June)

== Books ==
- Gino's Italian Escape (released 14 September 2013)
- Gino's Italian Escape: A Taste of the Sun (released 11 September 2014)
- Gino's Italian Escape: Islands in the Sun (released 29 October 2015)
- Gino's Hidden Italy (released 6 October 2016)
- Gino's Italian Coastal Escape (released 19 October 2017)
- Gino's Italian Adriatic Escape (released 18 October 2018)
- Gino's Italian Express (released 15 November 2019)
