= Kate Garraway =

English broadcaster (born 1967)

Kate Garraway MBE
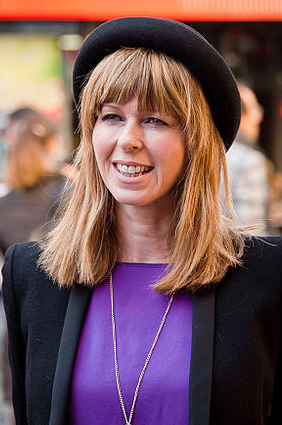
- Garraway in 2013
- Born: Kathryn Mary Garraway; 4 May 1967 (age 59); Abingdon, Berkshire, England
- Education: Bath College of Higher Education
- Occupations: Broadcaster; journalist
- Years active: 1994–present
- Television: GMTV (2000–2010); Daybreak (2010–2014); Lorraine (2010–2014, 2018, 2025); The National Lottery Draws (2014–2016); Good Morning Britain (2014–) Kate Garraway's Life Stories (2022–2023)
- Spouses: Ian Rumsey (m. 1998; div. 2002); Derek Draper (m. 2005; died 2024)
- Children: 2

Kathryn Mary Draper Garraway MBE (born 4 May 1967) is an English broadcaster and journalist. In the 1990s, Garraway was a journalist for ITV News Central and later a co-presenter of ITV News Meridian. From 2000 to 2010, she co-presented GMTV. Currently, Garraway is the presenter of Mid Mornings with Kate Garraway on Smooth Radio and newsreader (on Thursdays) and co-anchor (on Fridays and occasionally Thursdays) of the ITV Breakfast programme Good Morning Britain.

== Early life ==
Garraway was born in Abingdon, Berkshire. (Note: Abingdon-on-Thames was in the historic county of Berkshire at the time of her birth) Her father was a civil servant and her mother was a teacher. She attended Dunmore Primary School and Fitzharrys School in Abingdon. She then graduated from Bath College of Higher Education (now Bath Spa University) with a degree in English and history.

== Career ==
=== Television ===
In 1989, Garraway joined the South edition of ITV News Central on ITV Central as a production journalist, reporter and news presenter. In 1996, she became co-presenter of the South East edition of ITV News Meridian on ITV Meridian after she was "talent spotted" by a boss who viewed her presenting a three-minute bulletin on ITV Central.

In 1998, Garraway joined Sunrise on Sky News with Martin Stanford.

Garraway joined GMTV in September 2000, co-presenting GMTV Today with Andrew Castle each Friday (and Thursdays later on). Garraway eventually went on to share presenting duties with Fiona Phillips and Emma Crosby. In 2009, when GMTV relaunched, she co-hosted the programme with Ben Shephard, presenting on Mondays, Tuesdays and alternate Wednesdays. During Garraway's time at GMTV, she had also co-presented with Eamonn Holmes, John Stapleton and Dan Lobb. She presented her final show on 31 August 2010.

Garraway presented one series of Too Many Cooks in 2004. In 2007, she was a questioner on The People's Quiz. In 2009, Garraway presented The Biggest Loser for ITV. She was later replaced by Davina McCall. Garraway was a regular panellist on Wall of Fame, hosted by David Walliams.

Garraway became entertainment editor of Daybreak on ITV Breakfast (the successor to GMTV) in September 2010. On 6 December 2011, she took over from Christine Bleakley as the main presenter on an interim basis. On 4 May 2012, it was announced Lorraine Kelly would become the permanent replacement for Bleakley in September 2012. On 3 August 2012, it was reported that Garraway had signed a new contract to present each Friday in Kelly's absence. On 15 February 2014, it was announced Kelly would additionally front the Friday edition of Lorraine.

On 3 March 2014, it was reported that Daybreak would be cancelled and replaced with Good Morning Britain. However, with these changes came the news that Lorraine Kelly would be presenting Lorraine five days a week, meaning that Garraway no longer continued to present Kelly's show on Fridays. She hosted her final Daybreak and Lorraine shows on 25 April 2014 ahead of joining Good Morning Britain the following month. Since joining Good Morning Britain, Garraway's appearances on Lorraine have become less frequent. Garraway once again became interim main presenter on ITV Breakfast when Ben Shephard cut his appearances each week to just two; which meant Garraway hosted four times a week until Piers Morgan joined the show later that year.

From March 2014 until November 2016, Garraway occasionally presented The National Lottery Draws on BBC One. In September 2017, she made a cameo appearance in Hollyoaks.

In November 2019, Garraway came fourth in the nineteenth series of I'm a Celebrity...Get Me Out of Here!

In 2025, Garraway participated in the sixth series of The Masked Singer as "Spag Bol". Although she was eliminated in the first episode, her identity wasn't revealed until the second episode.

In May 2025, Garraway was announced as a contestant on the first series of The Celebrity Traitors. Garraway was selected as a 'Faithful', nearly making it to the final, but ultimately being banished in the eighth episode.

==== Strictly Come Dancing ====
Garraway appeared in the fifth series of Strictly Come Dancing, partnered with professional dancer Anton du Beke. Garraway finished 8th of the 14 couples despite receiving the lowest score from the judges in every week but one, as she was repeatedly saved by the public vote, prior to her elimination in week seven.

In February 2008, Garraway launched legal action against the Sunday Mirror after it published a photograph of her embracing du Beke, insinuating that they were having an affair, which the pair both denied.

Week	Dance/Song	Judges' scores				Total	Result
Week	Dance/Song	Horwood	Phillips	Goodman	Tonioli	Total	Result
2	Quickstep / "Love Machine"	2	4	5	4	15	Safe
3	Tango / "They"	4	5	5	5	19	Safe
4	Samba / "Dancing Queen"	3	3	6	4	16	Safe
5	Foxtrot / "I Could Write a Book"	5	7	7	7	26	Safe
6	Salsa / "Peanut Vendor"	3	4	6	5	18	Safe
7	Paso Doble / "Somebody Told Me"	4	5	7	5	21	Eliminated

=== Radio ===
Garraway's broadcasting career began with BBC Radio Oxford, and she had become an Independent Television News trainee journalist by 1994.

On 18 and 19 August 2012, Garraway co-presented two episodes of BBC Radio 5 Live's Weekend Breakfast (with Colin Paterson). Over the weekend of 8 September, Garraway again presented Weekend Breakfast with Paterson. On 6 October 2013, she stood in for Andrew Castle for a show on LBC Radio.

Since March 2014, Garraway has presented Mid Mornings with Kate Garraway 10am–1pm on Smooth Radio.

=== Books ===
She released her first book on 9 March 2017, entitled The Joy of Big Knickers (or learning to love the rest of your life).

On 29 April 2021, Garraway's latest book entitled The Power of Hope was released.

=== Charity work and awards ===
Garraway is a charity ambassador for the Make-A-Wish Foundation.

Garraway was appointed Member of the Order of the British Empire (MBE) in the 2022 New Year Honours for services to broadcasting, journalism and charity.

== Personal life ==
Garraway was married to Ian Rumsey, her former boss at ITV Meridian, from 1998 to 2002.

On 10 September 2005, Garraway married Derek Draper in Primrose Hill. Draper was a political aide to former Labour cabinet minister Peter Mandelson, and was at the centre of the scandal known as "Lobbygate". The couple had two children together: a daughter (born 10 March 2006), and a son (born 28 July 2009). They lived in Islington, having purchased a property there in 2004, before moving to Muswell Hill, north London, in 2016. Draper had an unusually serious case of long COVID; during the COVID-19 pandemic. He was diagnosed with COVID-19 in March 2020 and remained hospitalised in a critical condition as of March 2021. Garraway stated that he "may never recover" and could have "no quality of life" due to the numerous medical complications as a result of COVID-19. Draper returned home on a trial basis in April 2021, and Garraway announced his death in January 2024. Following Draper's death and the accumulation of significant care-related debts, Garraway sold the Islington property in 2025 while maintaining the family home in Muswell Hill.

She is a supporter of Gillingham FC.

On the ITV show DNA Journey Garraway found out that she is a relation of Michael Bond, the creator of Paddington Bear.

== Filmography ==
=== Television ===
Year	Title	Role	Episodes
1989–1996	ITV News Central	News presenter/reporter	
1996–1998	ITV News Meridian	News presenter	
1998–2000	Sunrise	News presenter	
2000–2010	GMTV	Co-presenter	Alternating episodes
2001, 2003–2014, 2017–	Loose Women	Guest panellist	18 episodes
2004	Too Many Cooks	Presenter	1 series
2005	This Morning	Guest presenter	1 episode
2007	Strictly Come Dancing	Contestant	Series 5
2007	The People's Quiz	Questioner	One series (12 episodes)
2009	The Biggest Loser	Presenter	One series (40 episodes)
2010–2014	Daybreak	Presenter	Entertainment editor (2010–2011)
2010–2014	Daybreak	Presenter	Acting Monday–Friday presenter (2011–2012)
2010–2014	Daybreak	Presenter	Friday presenter (2012–2014)
2010–2014, 2018, 2025	Lorraine	Presenter	Deputy presenter (2010–2011, 2014, 2018, 2025)
2010–2014, 2018, 2025	Lorraine	Presenter	Friday presenter (2012–2014)
2011	Wall of Fame	Regular panellist	One series (10 episodes)
2011	Carols from Bucklebury	Presenter	One-off episode
2014–2016	The National Lottery Draws	Presenter	Occasional episodes
2014–	Good Morning Britain	Newsreader	Thursday
2014–	Good Morning Britain	Presenter	Alongside Ben Shephard (2014–2024) and various presenters (2022–)
2017	GMB Today	Co-presenter	
2019	I'm a Celebrity...Get Me Out of Here!	Contestant	Series 19
2021	Kate Garraway: Finding Derek	Presenter/herself	Documentary
2021	Walking With...	Presenter/herself	Documentary
2022	Kate Garraway: Caring For Derek	Presenter/herself	Documentary
2022	Your Body Uncovered with Kate Garraway	Presenter	Six-part series
2022	Garraway's Good Stuff	Presenter	Lifestyle magazine show
2022	DNA Journey	Herself	One episode
2022–	Kate Garraway's Life Stories	Presenter	Replacing Piers Morgan
2024	Kate Garraway: Derek’s Story	Presenter/herself	Documentary
2025	The Masked Singer	Spag Bol	One episode, eliminated
2025	The Celebrity Traitors	Contestant	Series 1

=== Guest appearances ===
- Have I Got News for You (2003)
- The Wright Stuff (2003)
- 8 Out of 10 Cats (5 August 2005)
- Celebrity Stars in Their Eyes (2006)
- The F Word (2008)
- Alan Carr's Celebrity Ding Dong (2008)
- Shooting Stars (2008)
- As Seen on TV (2009)
- Who Wants to Be a Millionaire? (2007)
- Who Wants to Be a Millionaire? (2011)
- All Star Family Fortunes (2012)
- Pointless Celebrities (2012, 2014, 2015)
- Paddy's 2012 Show & Telly (2012)
- This Morning (2012; 5 episodes, 2023)
- Celebrity Juice (2013)
- Tricked (2013)
- The Chase: Celebrity Special (2013, 2019)
- The Guess List (2014)
- Celebrity Fifteen to One (2014)
- Countdown (2014)
- Pointless Celebrities (2015)
- James Martin: Home Comforts (2016)
- The Keith Lemon Sketch Show (2016)
- The TV That Made Me (2016)
- Safeword (2016)
- Through the Keyhole (2017)
- Hollyoaks (2017)
- Guess the Star (2017)
- Saturday Morning with James Martin (2018)
- The Crystal Maze (2018)
- Tipping Point: Lucky Stars (2019)
- Love Your Garden : Grow Your Own (2022)
- The Wheel (2024)
- The Great Stand Up to Cancer Bake Off (2025)

=== Film ===
Year	Title	Role	Notes
2017	Sharknado 5: Global Swarming	Herself	Cameo role
2017	The Lego Ninjago Movie	Herself (voice only)	Cameo role

== Authored works ==
- The Joy of Big Knickers: Or Learning to Love the Rest of Your Life, Blink Publishing, 2017. ISBN 9781911274483
- The Power of Hope, Bantam Press, 2021. ISBN 9781787635005
- The Strength of Love, Bonnier Books, 2023. ISBN 9781788707404

== Awards ==
Year	Group	Award	Work	Result
2021	National Television Awards	Authored Documentary	Kate Garraway: Finding Derek	Won
2022	National Television Awards	Authored Documentary	Kate Garraway: Caring for Derek	Won
2024	National Television Awards	Authored Documentary	Kate Garraway: Derek's Story	Won
