= Britain's Best Dish =

- Also known as: Best Dish: The Chefs (2011)
- Genre: Cooking Game show
- Directed by: Ruth Swarbrick; Adriana Caligiuri
- Presented by: Mark Nicholas (2007–10); Mary Nightingale (2011)
- Judges: Ed Baines; John Burton Race; Jilly Goolden
- Narrated by: Caroline Morris (2007–10); Rob Jarvis (2011)
- Country of origin: United Kingdom
- Original language: English
- No. of series: 6 (Regular); 2 (Celebrity)
- No. of episodes: 229 (Regular); 20 (Celebrity)

Production
- Executive producer: Ed Sayer
- Producers: Ruth Swarbrick; Adriana Caligiuri
- Production location: The London Studios
- Running time: 60 minutes (inc. adverts)
- Production company: ITV Studios

Original release
- Network: ITV
- Release: 17 September 2007 – 23 December 2011

Related
- ITV Food

Britain's Best Dish is a British daytime cookery show part of the ITV Food category on ITV and hosted by Mary Nightingale. Amateur cooks from around the UK compete to cook "Britain's Best Dish" and a prize of £10,000. The judges were Ed Baines, John Burton Race and Jilly Goolden. From October 2011, the competition was rebranded as simply Best Dish with new graphics and a new look studio.

The programme aired weekdays at 5pm from 2007 until 2011. A book containing recipes from the series was published in 2009.

== Format ==
In the regional heats, Monday to Thursday, three pairs of amateur cooks compete every day to produce the best starter, main and pudding with three winners from each course going through to a regional final on Friday. The judges choose the winners each day and also select the finalists to enter the regional final. In later rounds, heats select the best of the regional winners with a guest panel of critics taking on the task of choosing the winning dishes. The contestants are refined down to compete for Britain's best starter, main course and pudding. Of these, viewers then vote to decide the overall winner of the title "Britain's Best Dish" in the series final.

== Judging ==
The judges watch the contestants at work via a videolink and offer their comments on the preparations. The judges now taste the dishes in the presence of the cooks and offer them their comments whereas in earlier series, they tasted the dishes and conferred without the contestants in the studio.

== Host ==
The original host was ex-cricketer and sports presenter Mark Nicholas for series 1 to 4. Mary Nightingale took over as presenter for series 5 & 6 with the show getting a makeover with shortened opening credits and a refreshed theme tune but staying true to the main format.

== Best Dish: The Chefs ==
In October 2011, the series returned as Best Dish: The Chefs with a new logo and slicker look with professional chefs competing instead of amateurs. It still concentrates on recipes from around the regions of the UK with short clips showing the restaurants where the competitors work as professional chefs.

== Sponsors ==
The show has been sponsored by the New Covent Garden Soup Company, Uncle Ben's sauces and Red Tractor mark meats. Best Dish is now sponsored by Tesco Finest Range.

== Former features ==
The original series was broadcast in the autumn but from series 5, the programme was scheduled to run in the spring.

=== Auditions ===
From series 1 to 4, the show contained elements of "reality TV" with clips from regional auditions held around the UK making up a major element of the programme. The judges would taste dishes offered by members of the public attending the regional auditions. They would accept or reject the contestants at these food "auditions". The auditions were filmed in locations from around the UK with regional identities colouring the flavour of these early heats. This "reality show" feature was reduced in series 4 and by series 5 the early rounds of regional "auditions" were dropped from the series altogether and conducted off-air. There was also little mention of regional identities and the clips from the auditions were no longer shown on the programme. By series 6, the main action was concentrated in the kitchen in the studio with the relaunch as Best Dish.

== Transmissions ==
=== Regular ===
Series	Start date	End date	Episodes
1	17 September 2007	26 October 2007	30
2	1 September 2008	24 October 2008	40
3	7 September 2009	30 October 2009	40
4	2 August 2010	24 September 2010	40
5	4 April 2011	27 May 2011	39
6	31 October 2011	23 December 2011	40

=== Celebrity ===
Series	Start date	End date	Episodes
1	23 February 2009	13 March 2009	15
2	30 May 2011	3 June 2011	5

== International broadcasts ==
In Australia, Britain's Best Dish began airing as 'Best Dish' on the Seven Network's free-to-air digital channel 7Two at 8.30pm Friday nights in 2009 but as of 12 September 2010 is airing at 5pm weekdays under its full title.
