= Henrietta Green =

British food writer and critic

Henrietta Green (born 27 October 1948) is a British broadcaster, food writer, and local food advocate, probably best known for her championing of British speciality food producers. Born in London, she first published directories for the industry to source fresh British produce, which was sufficiently popular for her to shift her focus from trade to the consumer. First inspired by American greenmarkets, she has organised many farmers' markets; her first, in London's Borough Market, was in 1998 and helped revive the moribund market. However, after a dispute, the market banned her from further attendance. She has been generally praised for her commitment to promoting locally grown and produced food and her passion for research. Green has regularly appeared on several radio shows, particularly on BBC Radio Four's The Food Programme, and on television, including Woman's Hour and Taste The Nation, where she judged regional cooking. An award-winning journalist, Green has also written several books. Often outspoken in her opinions, she has been highly critical of the supermarket industry.

== Early life ==
Green was born and grew up in St John's Wood, and educated at Queen's College in Harley Street. Her father was a wealthy businessman. In her youth, she went on foreign holidays, which she later said formed her early interest in food, as she would go to local food markets with the cook. In 1969, she graduated from RADA with a diploma in stage management going on to work in films and advertising commercials. She spent 18 months in India doing meditation. In 1974, Green invested in Antonia Graham's Graham and Green kitchen reject chi-chi store in Notting Hill, "an Aladdin's cave of stylish clutter for the home". One off her earliest exposures to cooking for sale was in the early 1980s when she started making chocolates in the garage of an ex-coal miner and selling it locally; she later said the location was "unexpected". She visited the United States twice, in 1979 and 1981, which, Tamasin Day-Lewis has commented, "put her on track". In 1979, Green has said, all the popular food was foreign, but when she returned two years later there had been a move towards homegrown recipes.

== Career ==
Among the "six cooks/hoteliers, thirty-one journalists/writers, thirteen publishers/editors, nine historians, seven booksellers, one filmmaker, two broadcasters ... and twenty-three academics", Green took part in the Oxford Symposium on Science, Superstition and Tradition in the Kitchen in 1985. Green recognised the dearth of local produce in British cooking when compared with the culture in Europe. In the early 80s, Green visited New York, where she visited a greenmarket. Her interests shifted from food itself to its production. On her return from America—"full of gusto"—she put the idea for similar markets in London to the Greater London Council, which, however, refused her request for funding. Green has expressed her frustration with the response she received in the early days; approaching the Rare Breeds Survival Trust on where such produce could be bought, and being rejected, encouraged her to find out for herself.

In 1984, she was asked by the Park Lane Hilton to act as a consultant for their Harvest Food restaurant, which allowed her the opportunity to put her ideas into practice. She later explained that, although a difficult situation at first, the kitchen staff got used to her and "they even quite the idea of scattering whole viola flowers and nasturtiums over the salads". She was able to highlight rare breeds over intensively farmed animals of the present day. This experience led to her writing British Food Finds in 1987, which was followed by Foodlovers' Guide to Britain two years later. The latter was based on work she had done with the RAC over food guide. According to Bateman, Green

Piled into a car and set off to visit thousands of producers, compiling portraits of the people and their foods, and making a rigorous selection. An enlarged edition appeared in 1995—and is still being used today as a bible by everyone in the food business.

Green estimated that she drove approximately 15,000 miles (24,000 km) researching Food Lovers' Guide, and she later held live Q&A sessions with several producers at the Good Food Show in Birmingham. In 1992, she co-founded the Euroterroirs group with Alan Davidson. With funding from the EU, the group categorised the food of the 12 nations of the bloc, with the intention of extending the number of protected foodstuffs. Green's own first food market was established at St Christopher's Place, Marylebone, in 1995.

Green also undertook radio work, appearing, for example, on BBC Radio 4's 'Questions of Taste', a food-orientated quiz, Woman's Hour, A Good Read and The Food Programme. She produced and presented The Farming Week and presented Meeting for the Meal on the same channel.

=== Borough Market ===
In 1988, there was only a single regular farmers market in the country, in Bath, Somerset. Green's establishment of the three-day Food Lovers' Fair in November 1998 in Borough Market helped the market revitalise over the following years. (Note: By the mid-1990s the market had declined due to competition with Spitalfields and New Covent Garden Markets. and trustees decided to revive it as a retail rather than a wholesale market.) Green later recalled her nervousness before the fair opened: "I remember as we were about to open, standing looking at these 50 producers lined up in this slightly scummy hall, with rain dropping down on them, and thinking: "What have I done? Nobody’s going to come" ... How wrong could I be? We tapped into something of the zeitgeist". The official opening of the fair was a goat getting milked by Clarissa Dickson Wright and Jennifer Paterson.

Recruiting several long-term traders was central to the future of the project, as they remained even after the three days were over, and this success convinced the market's trustees to regenerate the market completely. According to The Sunday Times this "put Borough Market on the map" as a retailer of speciality, artisanal foods. However, she was later banned from Borough Market following a dispute with the market's trustees. Green argued that "Borough just kind of elbowed me out of the project. They seemed to think they could take my idea and run with it ... I was told I couldn't have a presence. It's ridiculous. I wrote their fucking cookbook." Following her parting ways with Borough Market, Green set up her own farmer's market on Rupert Street, Soho. Ed Smith's propaganda for the Borough Market trustees—called, without any apparent hint of irony, The Borough Market Cookbook—only names Green once, and that only by way of a quoted trader.

== Later career ==
From the mid-1990s, Green took Food Lovers' Fairs around the country, on one occasion living under canvas due to the venue. In June 2000, Green was involved in the rebranding of mail order group ("with internet ambitions") Le Franc, who also took part in Green's food fairs. while at the same time appearing as a regular judge on ITV's Taste the Nation in 2009. In 2017, she founded the British Charcuterie Awards, which highlighted the produce of 80 speciality food outlets, and donated recipes to charity. Management academics C. Michael Hall and Liz Sharples have suggested that Green was one of the first in the UK to recognise the value of a collective brand as an umbrella. Hence, her farmer's fairs were intended to allow small outlets the opportunity to sell to markets usually beyond their purview. Greene was by now a committed advocate of local food and production. She worked for Food From Britain again in 1996 when the agency asked her to open the North West Fare, where she also announced the formation of her new company, Foodlovers Direct. In 2007, she designed the menus for a European Union ministers' meeting in Newcastle upon Tyne, later stating that her instructions were to "showcase the country's food" and that "all the dishes had to sing out 'British'".

=== Writing ===
As well as working as a food and consumer affairs journalist, Green has published several "influential" books. Her early Fine Flavoured Dood was described by food critic Prue Leith as "slightly more extreme, but easier to cook from", compared to current cookbooks (Note: For instance, when compared to "sometime actor, director and super ego" Guy Deghy's The New Gourmet, which Leith found both amusing and irritating.) where Green demonstrates how to use a minimal amount of fat, "rather in the cuisine minceur style of Guérard". British Food Finds was a result of her work with Food From Britain and won the André Simon Award in 1987. Leith noted it had "a wide acclaim from almost everyone". The Food Lovers Guide of 1993 was described in The Daily Telegraph as "an impressive work", containing "much more description than in her previous directories", and won Green the Guild of Food Writers award the following year. Dickson Wright has called British Food finds and Food Lovers' Guide "seminal" works. The latter was republished in an expanded edition three years later, this time directed towards a public audience rather than trade. Food Lovers' Christmas, published in 1997, focussed on Christmas cooking and looked at sourcing produce—both traditional and exotic—as well as preparation methods. Green looked specifically at outlets that created the best produce she could find but which also provided delivery or mail order services. Other topics included purchasing Christmas trees, unusual presents and New Year's Eve party ideas. In 2001, Bateman described Green's Farmers' Market Cookbook as both a directory of farmers' markets in the UK at the time, several recipes, profiles of well-known producers and details of specialist foods available.

== Reputation ==
The consumer is gradually becoming aware of GM, additives, the decay of rural communities, food miles and over-packaging, and the small, speciality craft producer is becoming more important.

— Green on her approach to food production, 1999

Newspaper The Daily Telegraph has called Green "the Queen of Famers' Markets", and a "foodie force of nature" while The Sunday Times has said that Green turned Britain into a nation of food lovers", The Independent said she was partially responsible for the arrival of American farmers' markets in Britain the 1990s, and others that she had been "influential in raising awareness of British food". BBC Good Food magazine cited her for orchestrating "single-handedly a revival of specialist food producers". She has been described as one of a tranche of cookery writers who made traditional British cuisine fashionable, "redeem[ing] native dishes and ingredients with style and affection", (Note: Along with Jane and Sophie Grigson, Sybil Kapoor and Nigel Slater.) and one who has "changed the way [people] cook" in the UK. (Note: Along with, for example, Elizabeth David, Marguerite Patten, Robert Carrier, Madhur Jaffrey and Delia Smith, argues food journalist Michael Bateman.) In 1999 food journalist and chef Tamasin Day-Lewis has said that Green "is to shopping what Inspector Morse is to detecting: painstaking, obsessive, ruthless", while actor Alan Rickman called her recipes from Quick Cuisines as "fantastic fast food". She has also influenced others' research. For example, the National Farmers' Union began publishing directories of its own farm shops, while in 1986, the government set up Food From Britain, an agency for promoting British food abroad, with Green's input. The Independent commented that "some of its thinking was pretty simplistic, and she felt there should be more to it than slapping a Union Jack on an apple or piece of cheese and waiting for it to work its magic. Green herself has commented that the problem with this approach is that "there's no rationale behind what they say is good".

== Personal life ==
Green has been highly critical of the food industry. Discussing coffee at a Daily Telegraph coffee tasting session, she complained that it had "put her off instant coffee for life", and discussing Christmas turkeys, she complained that "typically, there are no meaningful turkey production standards in this country", and that the Quality Assurance Scheme "caters for the lowest of the low". Among the targets of her criticism are Rick Stein—whom she describes as "more telegenic" than her—and those she has accused of plagiarising her work for profit. Also in her sights are supermarkets, and Dickson Wright has described her as David to the supermarkets Goliath. Speaking to the Observer Food Monthly in 2005, Green emphasised that it was effectively a consumer choice, saying, "if you're terrified of Tesco and the way it is eroding our core values, then don't bloody shop there". Supermarkets, she explains, in her view compromise their standards and bear corporate responsibility for old skills and foods dying out:

They have shot themselves in the foot because they advertise their food being terribly good and terribly cheap, but the sad fact is you cannot have really good food if it is really cheap. Something has to give. We are stuffing things into a jar and every so often the lid pops off with another food scare.

She has publicly criticised those producers who she has visited but then failed to make into a finished book with "sharp comments"; for example, on Bakewell tarts, she has said, "go to Bakewell, have a tart, yuck!" She was critical of organic food in its early years, arguing that—"unless you know the producer personally"—while it was the only way to buy "100%-per-cent-reliable-source for welfare-friendly meet ... unfortunately it does not necessarily follow that it will also taste the best". In 1989, she also questioned whether organic food was healthier or better tasting due to the lack of scientific research while admitting the market as yet was "very small indeed". Conversely, she has praised the Duchy Originals brand as demonstrating what farmers and producers can achieve together. She describes herself as "a very eclectic, jackdawish kind of shopper, forever buying bits and pieces and keeping them in a drawer or freezer to use at any time". As a hobby, Green collects nudes; her first purchase was a piece by Rose Hilton.

== Works ==
- Fine Flavoured Food: Fresh Approach to Lighter Cookery, 1978
- The Marinade Cookbook, 1979
- British Food Finds, 1987
- RAC Food Routes: The Motorists' Guide to Seeing, Tasting and Buying Britain’s Best Local Food, 1988
- 10 Minute Cuisine: Good Fresh Food Very Fast, 1990
- Henrietta Green’s New Country Kitchen: The Best Produce, the Best Recipes, 1992
- Henrietta Green’s Food Lovers' Guide to Britain, 1993
- Fresh from the Garden: The RHS Cookbook, 1994
- The Festive Food of England, 1995
- Henrietta Green’s Food Lovers' Christmas, 1997
- Recipes from an English Country Garden (Sarah’s Garden), 1998
- Henrietta Green’s Farmers' Market Cookbook, 2001
- The Borough Market Book: From Roots to Renaissance, 2006
- A Green Guide to Traditional Country Foods, 2011
