= Great Food Live =

Great Food Live, formerly Good Food Live, was a British magazine programme hosted by Jeni Barnett and broadcast on UKTVFood part of the UKTV Network between 2001 and 2007. Jeni Barnett was joined every day by a chef co-host. The first co-hosts were Simon Rimmer, Paul Hollywood, Ed Baines and Paul Merrett, and later included Antony Worrall Thompson, Brian Turner, Sophie Grigson and Alan Coxon. Guest chefs demonstrated recipes, there were phone-ins, celebrity guests, and features on wine & spirits, new products and speciality foods. GFL was produced by independent production company, Prospect Pictures, its Editor was Elaine Bancroft, and Deputy Editor, Nikki Cooper.

The show was taken off the air on 6 April 2007 and a new show called Market Kitchen followed from 16 April 2007, featuring Tana Ramsay, Tom Parker Bowles, Rachel Allen, Matthew Fort and Matt Tebbutt.
