= Gontran Cherrier =

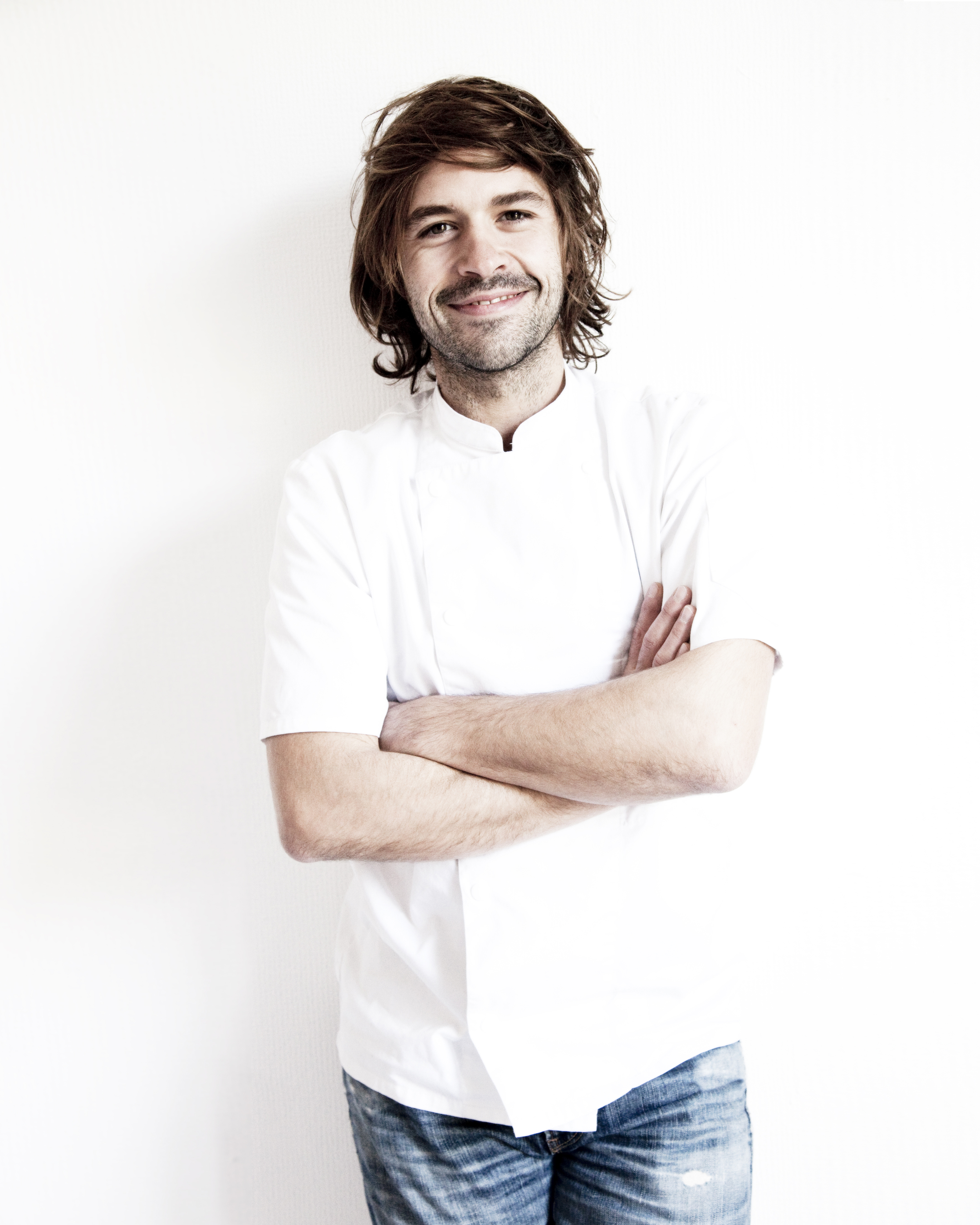

Gontran Cherrier (born 11 November 1978) is a French baker and pastry chef, a cookbook author, a TV presenter and an entrepreneur.

== Biography ==
=== Childhood ===
Gontran Cherrier was born 11 November 1978 in Luc-sur-Mer (Calvados), France, where he was raised. Cherrier is a fourth-generation baker. At 8 years old his parents moved to Paris and opened their first bakery where he earned his first stripes. At 16 he went to the prestigious Ferrandi culinary school and then to les Grands Moulin de Paris where the young chef has passed one by one the diplomas to become master baker.

=== Career ===
In 1999 he integrated the prestigious 3 Michelins stars restaurant "l’Arpège" and worked beside Alain Passard.

Cherrier is successively a pastry chef, a chocolate maker and a baker.

=== Medias ===
Gontran wrote in 2005 his first cookbook named "a croquer". Eight other books will follow in eight years: "Ultra chocolat", "Gontran joue de la casserole", "Les bons plats de Gontran", "Gontran fait son pain", "pains" "Pains, Toastés", "Cuisinez givré" & "Mini Cakes, tartes pies & Co". Followed by several editorial collaboration.

Cherrier presents his own TV shows: "Canaille+" "les Tartines de Gontran", followed by "Gontran cuisine". In 2011 he joined the team of de William LEYMERGIE at Télématin on France2.

In 2013 he was a member of the jury of "la meilleure boulangerie de France" (the best bakery in France), broadcast daily during one hour on M6.

== Gontran Cherrier shops ==
In 2010, Cherrier opened his first bakery in Montmartre in Paris followed by a second one in the 17th arrondissement of Paris, and a third in Saint-Germain-En-Laye en 2013.

In 2012, his first bakery abroad opened in Singapore under the name of Tiong Bahru Bakery by Gontran Cherrier quickly followed by Japan (Tokyo, Fukuoka, Nagoya...) and South Korea (Seoul, Busan...).

In 2016 the brand is expanding to Australia with the first opening in June in Melbourne on 140 Smith Street, Collingwood. quickly followed by Taiwan in July in Taipei City on 302, Section 4, Zhongxiao E Rd, Da’an District.
