= Paul Merrett =

British chef

- Born: Zanzibar
- Children: Ellie and Richard

Paul Merrett is a British TV personality and chef, based in Godalming who is known for being a guest chef on Saturday Kitchen, a resident chef on Sunday Feast, and starred in The Best along with Silvana Franco and Ben O'Donoghue. Paul Merrett owns and runs the Victoria Pub and Dining Rooms in Sheen. He has been awarded a Michelin star twice, and is the author of Using the Plot: Tales of an Allotment Chef (2008).

== Biography ==
Paul Merrett spent the first three years of his career as an apprentice chef at the Ritz in London's Piccadilly. Over the following ten years Paul worked for many top chefs including Peter Kromberg and Gary Rhodes.

Paul's first head chef position was at the Terrace Restaurant at the Meridian Hotel, London. He then moved to L’interlude restaurant in Charlotte Street. Twelve months after his arrival the restaurant was awarded a Michelin star. Despite this success the restaurant was sold by its investors and Paul moved onto The Greenhouse Restaurant in Mayfair, London where once again his food won a Michelin star.

In 2005 Paul was involved in the set up and launch of The Fulham gastro pub The Farm. Having taken a break in early 2008 to write his first book, Paul acquired, refurbished and relaunched The Victoria Public House, Dining Room and Hotel near Richmond Park in West London. It forms part of the Jolly Fine Pub Group, along with The Fox and Grapes on nearby Wimbledon Common, of which Paul is Chef Director.

Paul has two children - Ellie and Richard.
