= Ed Baines =

British chef

Edward Baines
- Occupation: Chef
- Culinary career
- Current restaurant(s): Randall and Aubin
- Previous restaurant(s): The River Café The Dorchester (apprenticeship) Bibendum Daphne's
- Television show(s): Britain's Best Dish (2007-2011)

Edward "Ed" Baines is an English chef best known for being a judge on Britain's Best Dish and for being an alternate chef on Sunday Feast with Paul Merrett. He trained in The River Café in London and his flagship restaurant is Randall & Aubin.

== Television ==
Baines' previous shows have included his first TV series Lunch with Ed Baines, which aired on Carlton Food Network and had him cooking for and then lunching with his famous friends at Randall & Aubin.

In 1999, he presented a six-part television series on ITV called Ed Baines Entertains, filmed at Randall & Aubin. He recorded two further series, which were broadcast during 2000 and 2001. He has also appeared as one of the chefs for the BBC daytime lifestyle show Housecall.

Baines filmed Cupid's Dinners for broadcast on UKTV Food and was one of the resident chefs on Great Food Live. He has regularly appeared on programmes for Granada Livetime, Central Television and Carlton Food Network and has featured on Superchefs. In December 2002 he was seen every weekday on Channel 5 from 2–20 December presenting Countdown to Christmas. He had his own series, Chefs at Sea for UKTV Food and appeared on the Terry & Gaby. In 2005 he has also appeared on the BBC's Ready Steady Cook and Taste on the Sky network. 2006 saw Baines co-present the ITV Food programme Sunday Feast, returning to the BBC with Paul Rankin for an appearance on Pointless Celebrities.

== Restaurants ==
After a two-year apprenticeship with Anton Mosimann at The Dorchester, Baines returned home to cook at Bibendum and the River Café. At 25 years of age, Baines was contracted by Mogens Tholstrup to open Daphne's in South Kensington, where he remained as Head Chef for three years. He also is the co-owner of the thriving Soho restaurant Randall & Aubin.

== Books ==
Entertain (2001) - Published by Kyle Cathie
Best of British (2009) - Published by Kyle Cathie.
