= Donald Parry =

Donald Parry may refer to:

- Donald W. Parry, professor of Hebrew Bible
- Donald Parry (rugby league)
- Donald Parry (cricketer)
