= Merchant Taylors' School, Northwood =

Boys' school in Northwood, Hertfordshire, England

Merchant Taylors' School
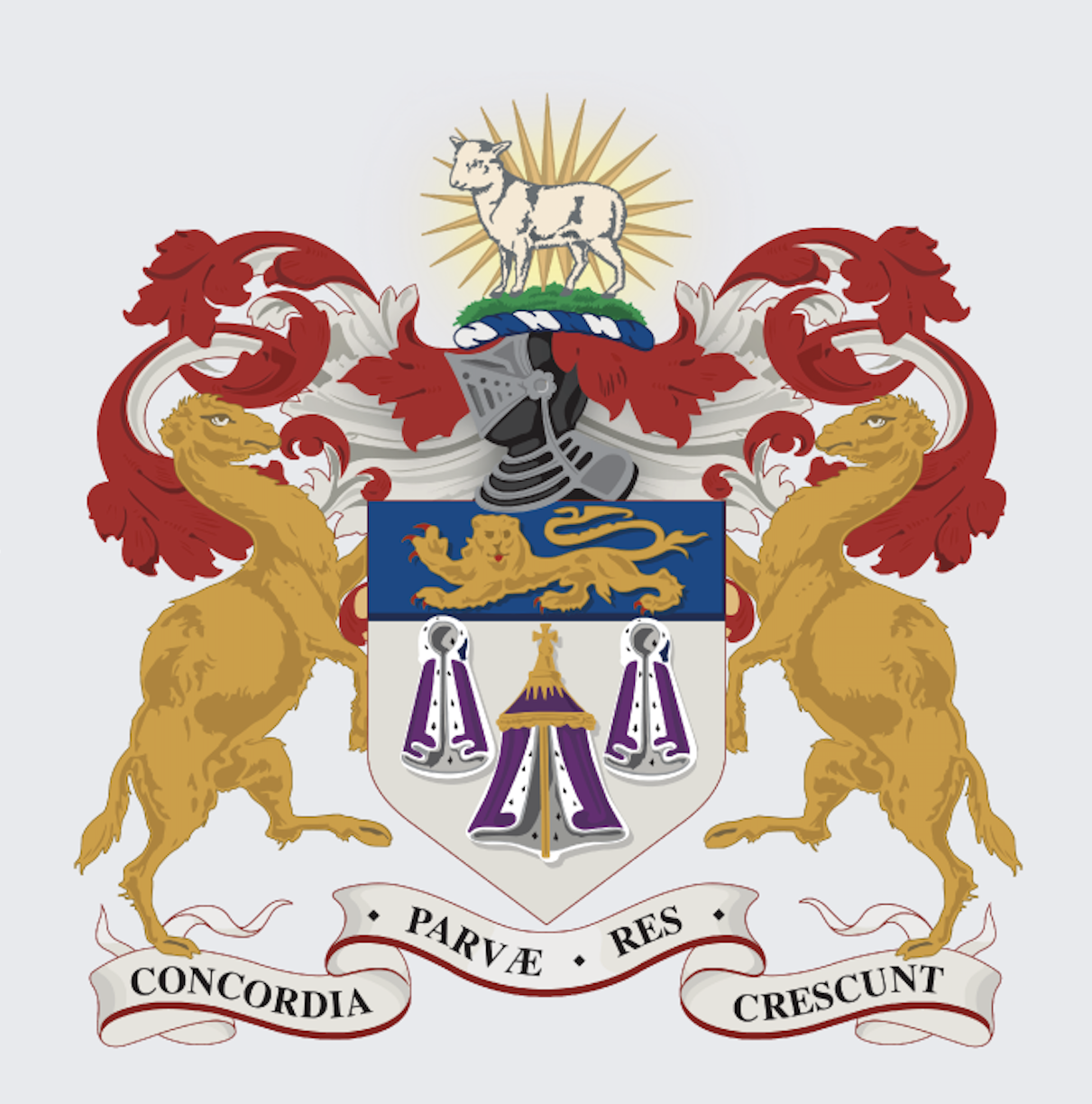
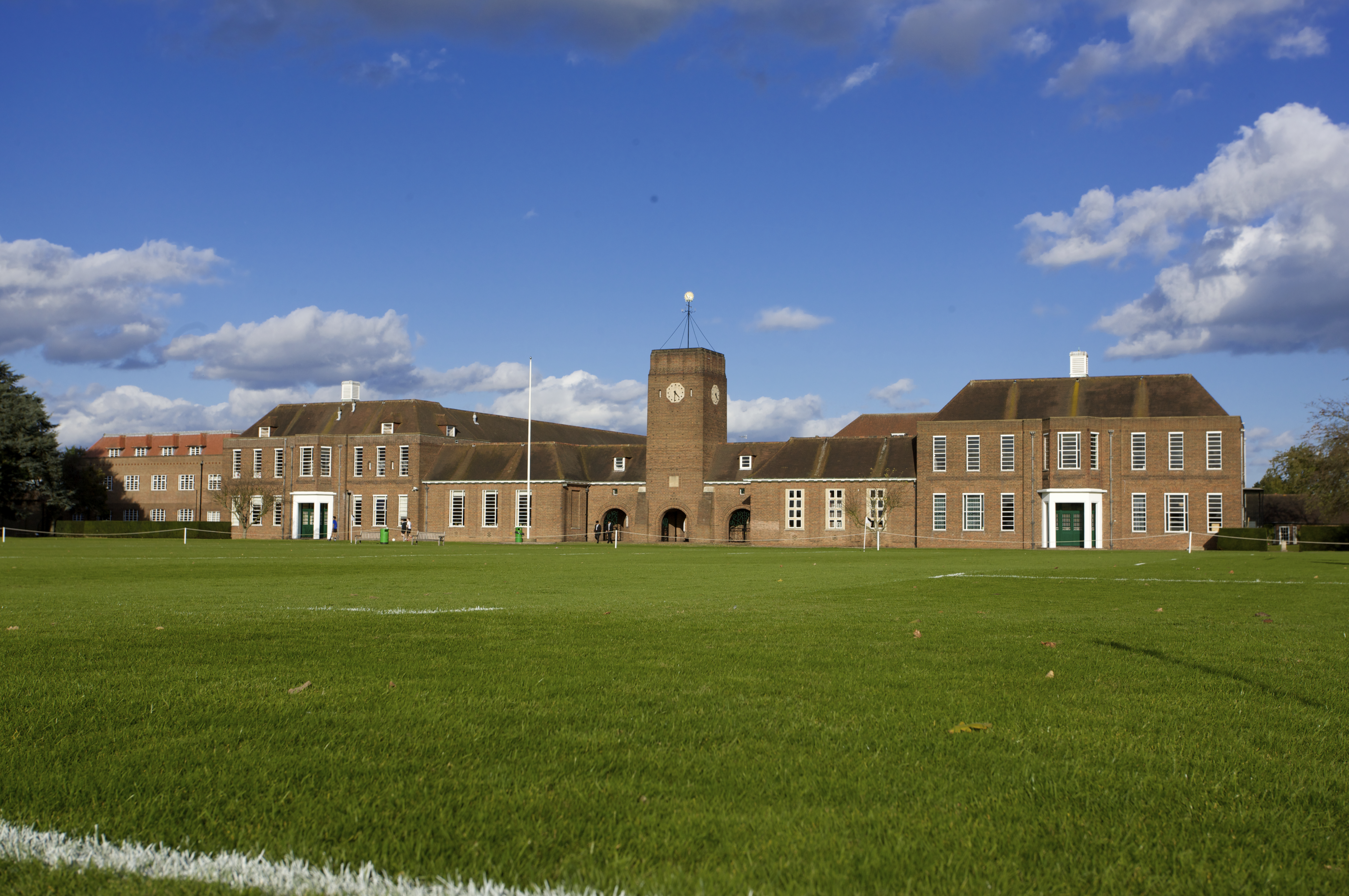
- School Coat of Arms Merchant Taylors' School at Sandy Lodge

Location
- Three Rivers, Hertfordshire, HA6 2HT; England; 51°38′06″N 0°25′27″W

Information
- Type: 11–18 boys Private day school Public school
- Motto: Latin: Concordia parvae res crescunt Small things grow in harmony
- Religious affiliation: Church of England
- Established: 1561; 465 years ago
- Founder: Thomas White
- Local authority: Three Rivers District Council
- Department for Education URN: 117616 Tables
- Chairman of Governors: Duncan Eggar
- Head Master: Sam Baldock
- Chaplain: James Fields
- Staff: ~80 (full-time)
- Gender: Boys
- Age: 11 to 18
- Enrolment: 1100
- Houses: 8
- Colour
- Publication: The Taylorian
- Alumni: Old Merchant Taylors ("OMTs")
- Affiliated school: Merchant Taylors' Prep Website: mtpn.org.uk
- School song: Latin: Homo Plantat, Homo Irrigat sed Deus dat Incrementum
- Affiliation: Merchant Taylors Company
- Website: mtsn.org.uk

Merchant Taylors' School is an 11–18 boys' public day school, founded in 1561 in London. The school has occupied various campuses. Since 1933 it has been at Sandy Lodge, a 285 acres (115 ha) site close to Northwood in the Three Rivers district of Hertfordshire. The school has 1100 students between the ages of 11 and 18. The school is an all-through school from age 3 to 18 after merging with Northwood Prep School in 2015.

Founded in 1561 by Sir Thomas White, Sir Richard Hilles, Emanuel Lucar and Stephen Hales, it was one of the nine English public schools investigated by the Clarendon Commission set up in 1861, and successfully argued that it should be omitted from the Public Schools Act 1868, as did St Paul's School, London, the other day school investigated by the Clarendon Commission.

== History ==
=== Establishment, 1561 ===
The school was founded in 1561 by Thomas White of the Merchant Taylors' Company in a manor house in the parish of St Lawrence Pountney in the City of London, where it remained until 1875.

A curious account survives of a rent payment ritual in London for the Merchant Taylors School in which Sir Rowland Hill, the Lord Mayor of London in 1549 who had coordinated the Geneva Bible translation, presided shortly before he died

The xxx day of September my lord mayre and the althermen and the new shreyffes took ther barges at the iij cranes in the Vintre and so to Westmynster, and so into the Cheker, and ther took ther hoythe; and ser Rowland Hyll whent up, and master Hoggys toke ser Rowland Hyll a choppyng kneyf, and one dyd hold a whyt rod, and he with the kneyf cute the rod in sunder a-for all the pepull; and after to London to ther plases to dener, my lord mayre and all the althermen and mony worshiphulle men.

Merchant Taylors' was not the first school to be founded by members of the Merchant Taylors' Company. Sir John Percival (Master of the Company in 1485, Lord Mayor of London in 1498) established a grammar school at Macclesfield in 1502, while in 1508 his widow founded one at St. Mary's Wike in Cornwall (which moved to Launceston shortly thereafter). Also in 1508, Sir Steven Jenyns (Master in 1490, Lord Mayor in 1508) founded Wolverhampton Grammar School, which still maintains strong links with the company. The first Head Master, Richard Mulcaster, took up his post in 1561; one of the houses at Merchant Taylors' is now named after him. His educational philosophy is embodied in two books, The Positions (1581) and The Elementarie (1582), the latter an instalment of a larger work and one of the first dictionaries in English. One of his first pupils was Edmund Spenser. His goal was that English as a language might claim its place side by side with Latin:

I love Rome, but London better, I favour Italy, but England more, I honour Latin, but worship English.

Mulcaster's views were ahead of his time: he advocated the importance to children of relaxation and games, and a knowledge of the countryside and world of nature. He "wished that schools were planted in the suburbs of towns near to the fields". He was also "tooth and nail for womankind" in matters of education. He believed that education should fit women for their appropriate station.

The successive outbreaks of plague in 1592, 1603, 1626, 1630, 1637 and 1666, had a damaging effect on the School and its pupils. The School was obliged to break up during these periods, losing pupils and sometimes unable to take on new ones. In 1626 the headmaster Nicholas Gray complained of the loss of pupils and was given £20 to keep the school going; in 1630 he was given £40. Many parents kept their sons away from school, and boarders were summoned home.

The School was closed for at least a year in 1636 and 1637, with no new boys admitted until the contagion abated. The outbreak of 1666 was curtailed by the Great Fire of London, which started on 2 September close to Suffolk Lane and completely destroyed the school buildings. It was rebuilt by 1675, after classes had met in temporary quarters for years.

=== 1606–1633 ===
In 1606 Robert Dow, a member of the company, instigated the process of "probation" or inspection, whereby the Court would visit the school three times each year and observe the school at work. Dow was concerned that the school was not meeting the challenge of being one of the great schools of the time and needed regular inspection to maintain and raise its standards. The Court appointed a committee to investigate and concluded:

Being situate neere the middest of this honourable and renowned citty is famous throughout all England ...First, for number of schollers, it is the greateste schoole included under one roofe. Secondly, the schollers are taught jointly by one master and three ushers. Thirdly it is a schoole for liberty most free, being open especially for poore men's children, as well of all nations, as for the merchauntailors themselves.

The probation was imposed without consultation with the schoolmasters. During the probation, the headmaster was required to open his copy of Cicero at random and read out a passage to the sixth form. The boys had to copy the passage from dictation and then translate it, first into English, then into Greek and then into Latin verse. After this, they had to write a passage of Latin and some verses on some topic chosen for the day. This was for the morning; in the afternoon the process was repeated in Greek, based on the Greek Testament, Aesop's Fables, "or some other very easie Greeke author". The standard in Greek was not as high as in Latin, but Hebrew was also taught.

This form of inspection was the model for teaching every day, as neither mathematics nor science were included in the curriculum. The pattern of teaching seen in the Probations at MTS was described in a popular work published in 1660, A New Discovery of the Art of Teaching Schoole by Charles Hoole. Hoole described the nature of education at the time:

- 6.00 a.m. was considered the time for children to start their studies but 7.00 a.m. was more common;
- Pupils of upper forms were appointed to give lessons to younger ones;
- Pupils were required to examine each other in pairs; and
- Children frequently went to "Writing-schooles" at the end of the school day; the purpose of this was to "learn a good hand". Good handwriting was supposed to be a condition of entry to a school like MTS but Hayne for one tended to ignore it and was eventually dismissed for, among other things, low standards of hand writing. In Germany at this time, there were writing schools too and many children attended only these in order to learn sufficient skills for commerce and trade; English businessmen founded schools which encouraged an academic curriculum based on the classics.

The Head Master William Hayne (1599–1624) presided over the new methods of examination, but his success did not save him from dismissal for alleged financial misdemeanours. He was said to have sold text books to pupils for profit, and received gifts of money at the end of term and on Shrove Tuesday, when the "Victory Penny" might be presented by pupils.

=== 1634–1685 ===
William Staple (Head Master 1634–1644) fell victim to contemporary politics. In October 1643 Parliament ordered "That the Committee for plundered Ministers shall have power to enquire after malignant School-masters." In March 1644 Staple was ordered to appear before this committee, but as a royalist, he had no intention of so doing. He was dismissed and the company had to seek a new headmaster.

The next Head Master William Dugard (1644–1661), previously headmaster of Stamford School, also ran into trouble. In 1649 he acquired a printing press and printed a pamphlet by Claudius Salmasius, a continental sympathiser with Charles I, entitled Defensio Regia pro Carolo Primo. Dugard was arrested and imprisoned, but as the pamphlet had not been distributed, his cousin Sir James Harrington was able to exert sufficient influence to have him released.

In 1647 Dugard had been appointed a member of the Stationers' Company; he did not declare his interests to the Court, and they were most annoyed at this extracurricular activity. In 1652, during the commonwealth, a time of religious experimentation, Dugard published Catechesis Ecclesiarum Poloniae et Lithuaniae (Ecclesiastical Catechism of Poland and Lithuania), a work that rejected Trinitarianism. Though the work had been licensed by Milton, it was seized and publicly burned, yet Dugard survived as headmaster and was simply required to give up his printing enterprise.

At this time the school fees were set at 2s 2d or 5s per quarter or nothing, but Dugard charged a variety of amounts; the number of pupils was down from the 250 expected by the company. When he left in 1661, he set up a new school in Coleman Street and took a number of MTS pupils with him.

The next headmaster, John Goad (1661–1681), guided the school through rebuilding after the plague in 1666 and the destruction of the Great Fire of London. His eventual dismissal may have been influenced by the accusations of Titus Oates, who had been a pupil at MTS for a few months in 1665–66, although Goad survived for years afterward. Oates had brief stays at other schools, being dismissed from each in turn. In 1678 Oates "discovered" the "Popish Plot", which was supposed to include a threat to kill Charles II, but it was later found to be a hoax by him. William Smith, a master at MTS and later headmaster at the Brewers' School in Islington, wrote of his first encounter with Oates:

In the year 1664 he was brought to Merchant Taylors' School, as a free Scholar, by Nicholas Delves, Esq., now living; he happening to be in Books that were taught in my Form, I was sent down to receive him into the School, which I did in an unlucky hour. And truly, the first trick he played me was That he cheated me of our Entrance Money which his father sent me, which the Doctor generously confessed in his Greatness at Whitehall and very Honestly paid me then.

In 1676, Oates confronted Smith and accused him of participating in yet another fabricated plot, forcing Smith to commit perjury to avoid punishment. Initially, the MTS Probation Book described Oates as "The saviour of the nation, first discoverer of ye damnable Popish Plot in 1678." However, by 1685, a postscript had been added, labeling him "Perjurd upon Record and a Scoundrell Fellow." In this atmosphere of suspicion, even a hint of Roman Catholic sympathies was enough to ruin a man's reputation. After his dismissal in 1681, Goad converted to Roman Catholicism.

=== 1686–1759 ===
When the headmastership fell vacant again in 1686, King James II tried to force his nominee James Lee on the company. The election was postponed and the Master, Sir William Dodson, persuaded Lee to withdraw his nomination. Lee, formerly second usher at MTS and then headmaster at St Saviour's Free School, Southwark, stood against Ambrose Bonwicke but lost. Bonwicke, OMT, was a former pupil of Goad and had an acute mind, but he was dismissed for his political sentiments.

James abdicated in 1688, William III and Mary II acceded, and men were obliged once again to proclaim their loyalties. The majority avoided controversy by swearing allegiance to "the king". Bonwicke delayed for a year before the Court was forced by Act of Parliament to hear his oath of allegiance. Bonwicke said he supported James and was duly dismissed.

Under Matthew Shortyng, Head Master 1691–1707, the top boys of the Sixth began to be called "The Table" and "The Bench", with nine at the Table, the captain and eight monitors; and nine at the Bench, called prompters because they prompted the monitors on election day.

In 1710 Ambrose Bonwicke, son of the former Head Master, was captain of the school and refused to read prayers for King William on St Barnabas Day. Despite his intellectual prowess, his family's continuing support for James cost Bonwicke his election to St. John's College, Oxford and he went to St. John's College, Cambridge instead. At this time, there was a shortage of places at the school, as its reputation for scholarship and consequent chance of a university education attracted parents from all over the country. In 1750 a regulation was passed that boys should not be eligible for election to St. John's Oxford unless they had been at MTS for at least three years.

One pupil who would not have qualified for election under this rule was Robert Clive. He was at MTS from 1738 to 1739 and completed his education at Shrewsbury in his native Shropshire. The Head Master was then John Criche, OMT, a man who had occupied every position in the school and was not predisposed to change it. Criche was also a Jacobite. The school suffered during his tenure because parents were unwilling to send their sons to a school where anti-dynastic sentiments might prevail. Criche died in office at the age of 80, by when the school enrollment numbers had fallen from 244 to 116.

=== 1760–1813 ===
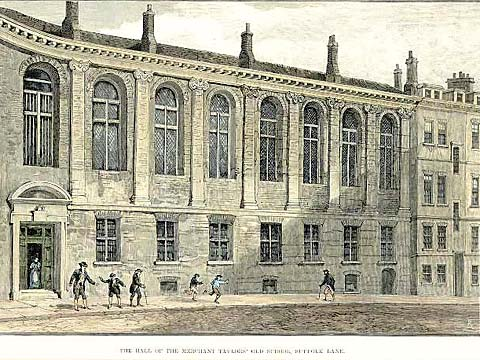
The School at Suffolk Lane in 1815

The next Head Master, James Townley, was in office from 1760 to 1768. Townley wrote a successful play, High Life Below Stairs, which was staged at Drury Lane by David Garrick and proved very popular.

The next three headmasters over the period 1778–1819, Green, Bishop and Cherry, were all OMTs. One of Bishop's pupils, Charles Mathews, went on to become a successful actor and comedian. His memoirs, from the late 18th century, include these observations:

I was now translated from Dominie the flagellator's garden of knowledge in St Martin-in-the-Fields to Merchant Tailors' School, to gain what Pope so aptly terms 'a dangerous thing', a little learning. This was about the year 1786. Bishop, the head master, wore a huge powdered wig, larger than any other bishop's wig. It invited invasion, and we shot paper darts with such singular dexterity into the protruding bush behind that it looked like 'a fretful porcupine'. He had chalk stone knuckles too, which he used to rap on my head like a bag of marbles, and, eccentric as it may appear, pinching was his favorite amusement, which he brought to great perfection.

There were six forms. I entered the school at the lowest, and got no higher than the fifth, but was of course alternately under the care and tuition of the four masters. Gardner, the lowest in the grade, was the only mild person amongst them; the others had a little too much, and perhaps he had much too little, of the severe in him for his station.

Two more cruel tyrants than Bishop and Rose never existed. .. Lord, the fourth master, was rather an invalid, and, I believe, had been prescribed gentle exercise; he therefore put up for, and was the successful candidate for, the flogging department. Rose was so adept at the cane, that I once saw a boy strip, after a thrashing from him, that he might expose his barbarous cruelty, when the back was actually striped with dark streaks like a zebra.

=== 1814–1844 ===
In 1814 Cherry made a detailed proposal for the setting up of an arithmetic and writing school and for the teaching of mathematics and accounts. Again the proposal was first deferred and then dropped. It was to be a further 15 years before mathematics was finally admitted into the school curriculum. In 1811 H.B. Wilson was granted permission to write a history of the school but he was overlooked as Head Master in 1819 on the appointment of James Bellamy, Head Master 1819–45. In 1828 Bellamy advised the Company of the need to modernise to "meet the daily increasing demand for a more general education", by which he meant in particular the founding of University College and King's College at the University of London. In 1830 education was as topical as it is today with writers like Christopher North advocating its spread, though fearful of the consequences, "from the classes to the masses". The Court voted £200 towards the founding of King's College and in 1829 Bellamy once again pleaded that the school be placed on the same level as other places of education. Beginning in 1830, classics was taught in the morning and mathematics in the afternoon, specialist teachers were appointed and by 1845 French was being considered for two afternoons per week. The last proposal proved too expensive but the further success of the school began to make it clear that the current premises were too small and new ones should be found.

Still, in the 1870s, Sir D'Arcy Power comments on the curriculum he faced:

It seems to me, as I look back on the education at school in my time, that it was conducted with the design of giving a broad training without any utilitarian object. Every boy gained a sound knowledge of the classics, could write a little Latin and Greek prose and make a few verses; if he reached the higher forms, he learnt at least the Hebrew alphabet, but every boy was passed through the same mould without discrimination, no attempt was made to find out what his special aptitude might be. The best boys got on through sheer ability. .. The vast majority of boys went as stockbrokers' clerks, into merchants' offices or into business.

Nor was there much teaching of English. Bishop Samuel Thornton wrote:

Incredible as it may seem, we were left to pick up our acquaintance with the classics of our own language out of school, as best we could. I read my English poets in the street as I walked from school.

He adds however:

In what was professedly taught there was instilled (and this is my deepest debt to Merchant Taylors') a passion for thoroughness and accuracy, and a contempt for all smatteriness and mere pretence of knowledge.

It is likely that many parents cared little what was taught as long as their boys did well enough to attain a scholarship to university.

The city environment around it included a brewery which belched smoke and soot and a printing works whose apprentices fought with M.T.S. boys almost daily. According to A. J. Church in 1857:

there were no desks in the schoolroom. The monitors had a table; the prompters had a bench. Everyone else had to write, when there was occasion for writing, on his knees. And there were no lights. Every boy had to supply his own candle, which was required to be of wax...

For more than two centuries the only place where teaching was carried on was the Great Schoolroom; its dimensions were about 85 feet (26 m) by 30 feet (9.1 m). It was lighted very imperfectly by windows on either side, large enough, indeed, but obscured by the heavy leading of the diamond panes and by the long-standing accumulations of dirt ... The four classrooms were all more or less recent additions to the school accommodation. Bishop Samuel Thornton remembered the London fogs of his schooldays in the 1840s when "little was done on those dark days, the dreamy and unwonted state of affairs generating an excited condition in the Forms, unfavourable to discipline and work". There was also a constant din from outside the school which interfered greatly with the conduct of lessons. Until the 1860s no provision was made for feeding the boys at lunch time. In 1838 there were 58 boys in the Fourth, being taught in this room and without gas lighting – small wonder that the masters resorted to the stick to keep control.

=== 1845–1865 ===
James Augustus Hessey, Head Master from 1845 to 1870, improved many aspects of the school, increasing the number of masters, introducing school lunches and appointing a 'superior' teacher of mathematics. The rough practices among the boys of 'pulling' on clothes and 'bumping' against the pillars of the cloisters were banned, something which at first caused open rebellion among the younger boys but in which Hessey had his way by his firm insistence on more civilised behaviour. Hessey was also agitating for a change of location. Two Commissions of this time, the Oxford Commission and the Public Schools Commission (under Lord Clarendon), threatened the well-being of the school. The Oxford Commission restructured the arrangements for scholarships between the school and St. John's College so there was no longer such an easy path for boys to reach university. There had grown a general feeling that all was not well with Eton and other "public" schools and the commission was appointed to investigate and put this right. The Schools Commission visited M.T.S. in 1862 and published its report in 1864. It was noted that parents were increasingly reluctant to send their sons to school in London due to the overcrowding, the lack of games facilities and increasing accessibility to country schools. It was proposed that Charterhouse and Westminster, boarding schools, should move out of London and that Merchant Taylors' and St. Paul's, day schools, should increase their premises. It was also recommended that, while the classical character of the curriculum should be continued, science, German, music and more drawing should be introduced.

=== 1866–1907 ===
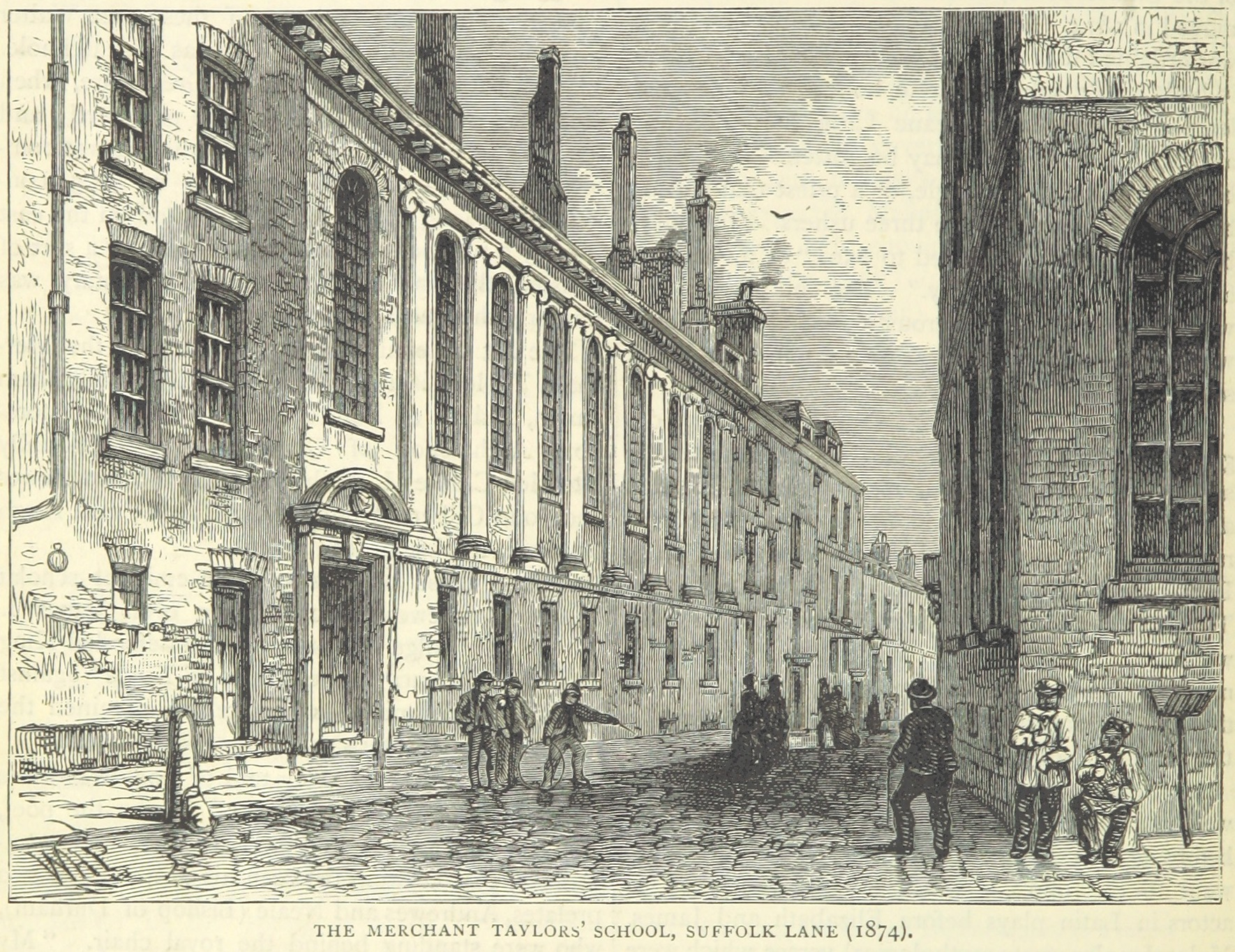
The school at Suffolk Lane in 1874

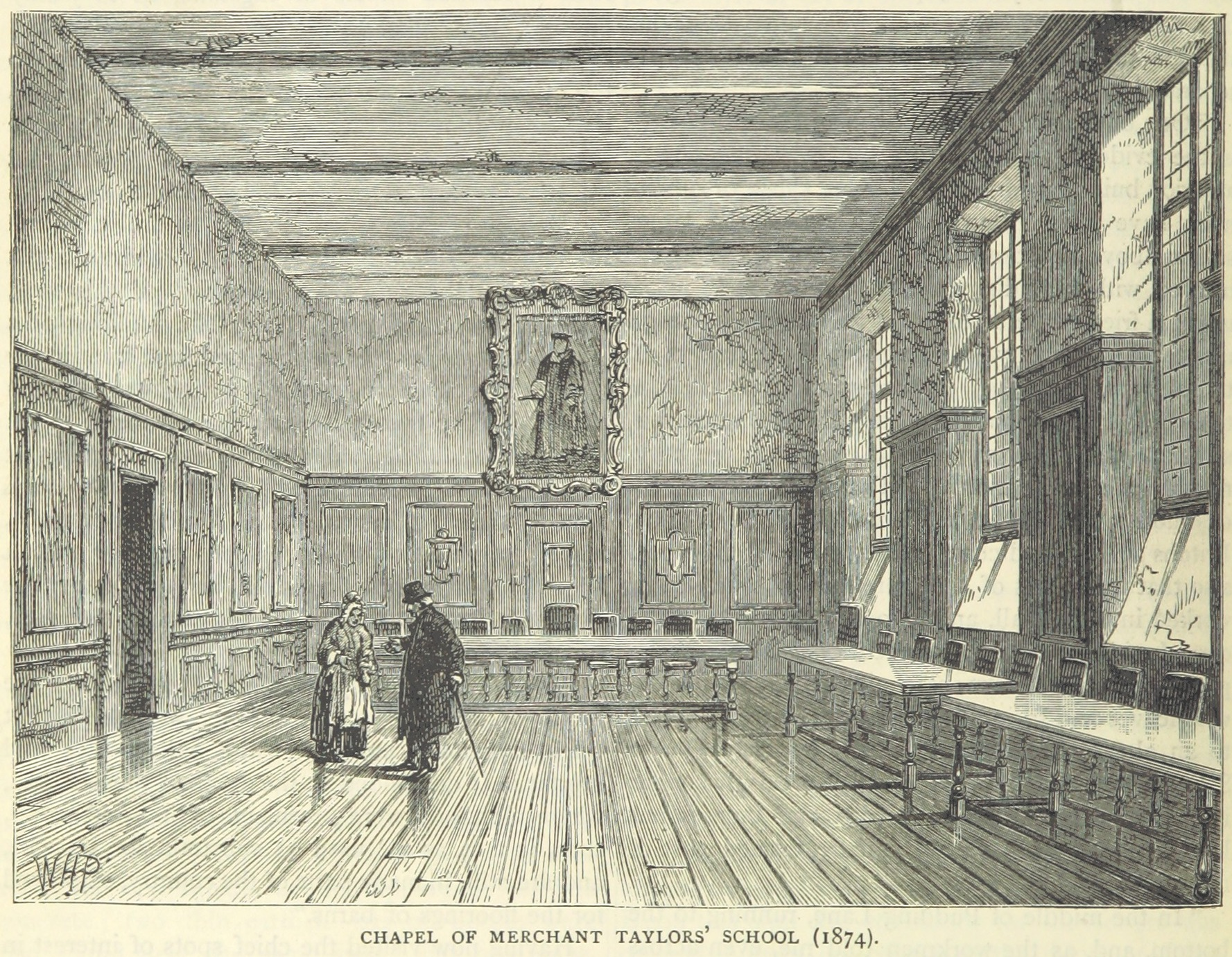
The chapel in 1874

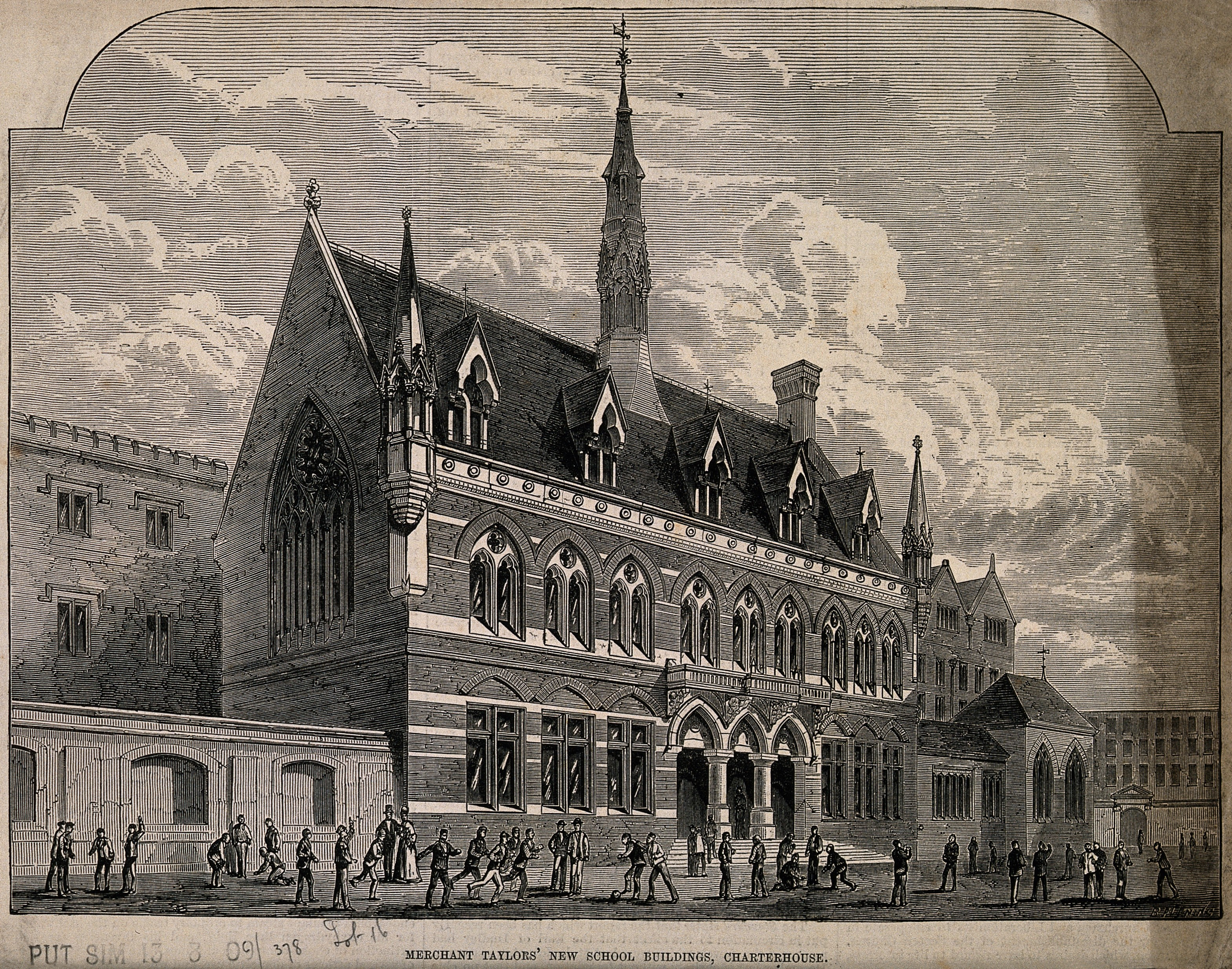
The new School, at Charterhouse, 1875

In 1866, following reasoned argument from Hessey and the report of the commission, the Company bought 5.5 acres (22,000 m^{2}) of estate in Goswell Street for £90,000 from the Governors of the Charterhouse. Charterhouse School vacated the London Charterhouse in 1872, and it was taken over by Merchant Taylors. New school buildings were begun in 1873 and completed in 1875. Plans for the school on the new site included immediate expansion to 350 boys and later to 500, the development of a more modern curriculum to meet demand for "Modern Languages, Science and Commerce", and the raising of fees from 10 to 12 guineas for the lower school and 12 guineas to 15 guineas for the upper. William Baker, OMT, Head Master from 1870 to 1900, wanted to develop the whole of the new site for games, "to foster a corporate and public spirit among the boys of the School, by drawing them together in common amusements and giving them common interests". On the development of playing fields around the school, Baker wrote in 1872:

Besides this, I regard such an arrangement as desirable for the healthy development of a boy's character and as furnishing a wholesome corrective to the narrowing effects of excessive competition.

These ideas were in line with the policy of other public schools, which had placed great emphasis on games and outdoor activities (as they still, for the most part, do) since the time of Thomas Arnold at Rugby School. Baker was conservative in his views, considering the classics as the best means of training the mind, but he was almost equally keen on mathematics and paid much attention to its teaching in the school. In his time, chemistry and physics were introduced, and a new science building was finished in 1891. Baker proposed the introduction of biology, which was first taught as an extra in 1900.

French was still in a precarious position within the school curriculum – from a total of 3900 marks (from 78 scripts worth 50 marks each) in an examination in 1874 only 123 marks were actually scored and 53 boys submitted blank papers. The master in charge of the 'Modern Side' pointed out that boys joined his area not because they showed promise in French but because they had no obvious gift for the classics. On the appointment of John Nairn in 1900 to succeed Baker the new headmaster asked Professor Ernest Weekly to inspect the modern language teaching. He drew attention to the dominant role of Latin in determining a boy's promotion, to the beginning of Greek at too young an age and to the lack of systematic instruction in English. Meanwhile, Baker recommended the adoption of the newly established Oxford and Cambridge Schools Examination Board for examination of higher work which for the first time provided a means for comparison between schools. Until this point schools could differ considerably in the ways they assessed pupils and conducted their affairs; today we take for granted the existence of national standards and criteria and the use of public examination results to compare one school, however invidiously, against another.

In the early 1900s the number of boys at the school began to fall, due in part to the rise of good and not too expensive schools in the country around London such as Bedford School, Berkhamsted, University College School, King's College School, St. Dunstan's, St Olave's and Latymer Upper School, amongst others. Science and technical subjects were being developed in institutions funded by public money and there was some pressure on the incomes of the class that sent its sons to schools like Merchant Taylors'. It became increasingly apparent that boys were travelling long distances to school each day, from as far as Hertford, Guildford and Leigh-on-Sea, the school needed a prep. school for boys aged 8–11 and a sports ground nearer than Bellingham. Nairn began to think that the school might be better placed on the outskirts of London. In 1914 the Oxford and Cambridge School Examination Board inspected the school and, amongst their conclusions, found the hours of the school too short and the homework too long, all of which limited their time for fresh air and recreation. The Board also said that the curriculum was too narrow, that the needs of a few potential classical scholars were dominating the needs of the many. Even at this stage the only education in English teaching was gained from the translation of Latin and Greek. In the 1860s the school had been 'one of the nine' but its position was now threatened by the competition of new schools. In 1925 the matter of the school's location was raised again but any suggestion that it should be moved was vetoed by the School Committee.

=== 1908–1927 ===
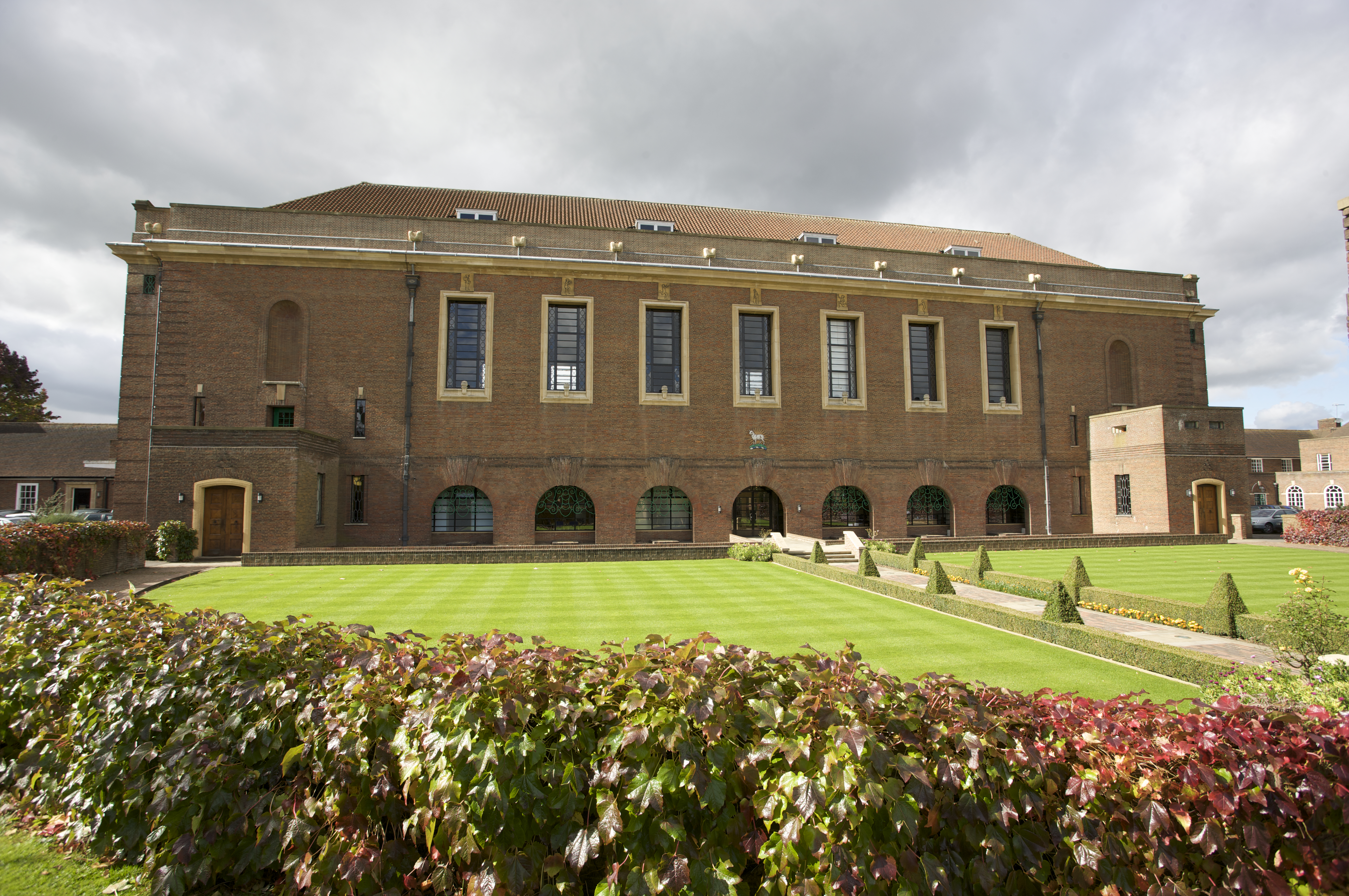
Merchant Taylors' School, Great Hall

In 1908 Lord Haldane reorganised the School cadet corps, making them into a single body, the Officer Training Corps, which provided an essential source of officers for the First World War. In 1912 the London Rifle Brigade was permitted to billet three companies in the school and when war came the regiment was billeted there. The Old Merchant Taylors held a meeting at the Hall and 200 enlisted forthwith. In 1918 enlistment in the O.T.C. became compulsory and in 1921 a house system was introduced with four houses named Hilles, White, Spenser and Clive.

=== 1927–1961 ===
The next Head Master, Spencer Leeson, served for just nine years but in that time he proposed and supervised what was probably the greatest single event in the history of the school, the movement from the city of London to the green suburbs of Ruislip, Northwood, and Rickmansworth, an area bounded by branches of the Metropolitan Railway. Leeson made his mind up quickly and advised a move and the Company fell quickly behind him. He invited an inspection by the Board of Education in 1928 and concluded from their report that the school must move: "At Charterhouse Square we can never rejoin the number of the great schools of England". He attached a letter from Cyril Norwood which included these words:

In these next twenty years we shall see a belt of good secondary schools built all round London at a sufficient distance out to provide playing fields and space, and with all that is modern in equipment. These schools will be efficient and the middle class parent will send his sons either to boarding schools, if he can afford it, or to these schools. He will not send them to the noise and congestion of London, to premises which are congested and largely out of date, with playing fields miles away from the teaching centre...

The site at Sandy Lodge was bought in late 1929 and plans were drawn up for the new school by architect WG Newton, in the Neo-Georgian style The cost of the initial proposals was greeted with some dismay, meaning that they had to be revised "at great sacrifice of beauty and efficiency" to bring costs down, and eventually the Court accepted them. The site at Charterhouse Square was sold to St. Bartholomew's Hospital who had been previous owners, having bought the site in 1349 from the Master of the Spital Croft hospital. The move to Sandy Lodge was completed in March 1933, with a farewell service to the city held at St. Paul's Cathedral on 20 March. The first new term at Sandy Lodge began on 4 May, and the School was formally opened on 12 June.

Birley's headmastership was defined by the events of the Second World War, when many of the masters and students were called up to fight. Before war broke out, Birley proposed to build a chapel which would fit the entire school (about 600 pupils at this time). Plans for a whole-school chapel had been included in the original plans for the school, but never came to fruition – partially due to budgetary constraints. These plans were revisited and reworked by Master R. T. D. Sayle, and after much convincing the Court agreed to proceed with the proposal. However, just as the plans had taken shape, the Second World War put them on indefinite hold. Instead, the temporary chapel (occupying the space intended to be a classroom) was renovated, and became the chapel which is still in place today.

When the War ended, Birley informed the Court that he wished to retire, and allow a younger, more energetic man to take over. Before he left, The Third form (years 7 & 8) was introduced to allow those from state primaries to enter the school, following the Fleming Committee report in 1944. Lord Clauson, who had great influence within the Court, was particularly eager to implement the scheme: "Our predecessors made an educational ladder on which boys could climb to the university, whatever their circumstances. The ladder is still here, but a rung is missing and we must put it back." It was named the 'Third Form' because the age of entry had been raised from 10 to 13 in the early 20th century, as such the bottom three forms had vanished. This meant that by 1944 the lowest year at the school was the Fourth Form.

Upon entering office, Elder set about re-organising the house system which had been implemented in 1921, which he viewed as dysfunctional. The boarders of the Manor of the Rose were spread throughout all four houses, and it was believed that houses of 120 were too large (as of 2017, each house has about 110 students) – as well as lacking Housemasters. It seemed to Elder that membership of houses meant very little to the students. As such, he re-divided the school into eight houses, giving boarders their own house (Manor of the Rose), and introducing three new houses (Andrewes, Mulcaster and Walter). Elder created the position of Housemaster, who he envisaged would be the pastoral support of each pupil throughout their career.

In addition, reform was creeping into the school at this time, with the privilege of not wearing a cap (which had previously only applied to Monitors), was extended to Prompters and House Prefects, and subsequently to the entire Sixth Form. Around this time, Elder re-introduced the position of Second Master, which had been absent for many years. Games was also made compulsory during his tenure.

The school celebrated its quatercentenary in 1961, and a new art block was given by the Merchant Taylors' Company to honour the event.

=== 1961–present ===
Hugh Elder was succeeded by Brian Rees (1965–73) and subsequently by Francis Davey (1974–81), under whose tenures the Recital Hall and a new Biology department were built. Under the headmastership of David Skipper (1982–91), wide-ranging developments took place, notably the building of a new Sports Hall and indoor swimming pool (1986), with the old Gymnasium being converted into a studio theatre for Drama.

During the tenure of Jon Gabitass (1991–2004), the sports complex was expanded, and on the east side of the school, the Recital Hall/Biology department was joined by a Modern Languages building, expanded Art block, and a new lecture theatre. Under Gabitass, Saturday schooling was abolished, and boarding was ended soon after 2000 due to a decline in demand. The Manor of the Rose became a day house just like the other seven houses, and the building converted into staff accommodation. Also under Gabitass, the area under the Great Hall was redeveloped, introducing a reception area and Sixth Form Common Room. Gabitass also oversaw the removal of the Old Merchant Taylors’ clubhouse from Croxley Green to the school site.

The school celebrated its 450th anniversary in 2011, and retains close links with other Merchant Taylors' schools through the Merchant Taylors' Educational Trust and with the Merchant Taylors' Company itself. The members of the Worshipful Company of Merchant Taylors visit the school at least twice a year – notably on St Barnabas' Day and Doctors' Day – and form the school's governing body. Under Simon Everson (2013–present), a new Design and Technology block has been built (2016) and the Fives courts were demolished and replaced by a modern Geography centre. In 2024 a new cricket centre was opened.

In March 2024, the school announced that all 13+ admission would halt after 2025.

In March 2025, Simon Everson, the current Head Master, announced he would be stepping down at the end of the 2025–26 school year. He will be succeeded by Sam Baldock, previously Vice Master of Bedford School, a school founded by Sir William Harpur, a member of the Merchant Taylors' Company.

== Overview ==
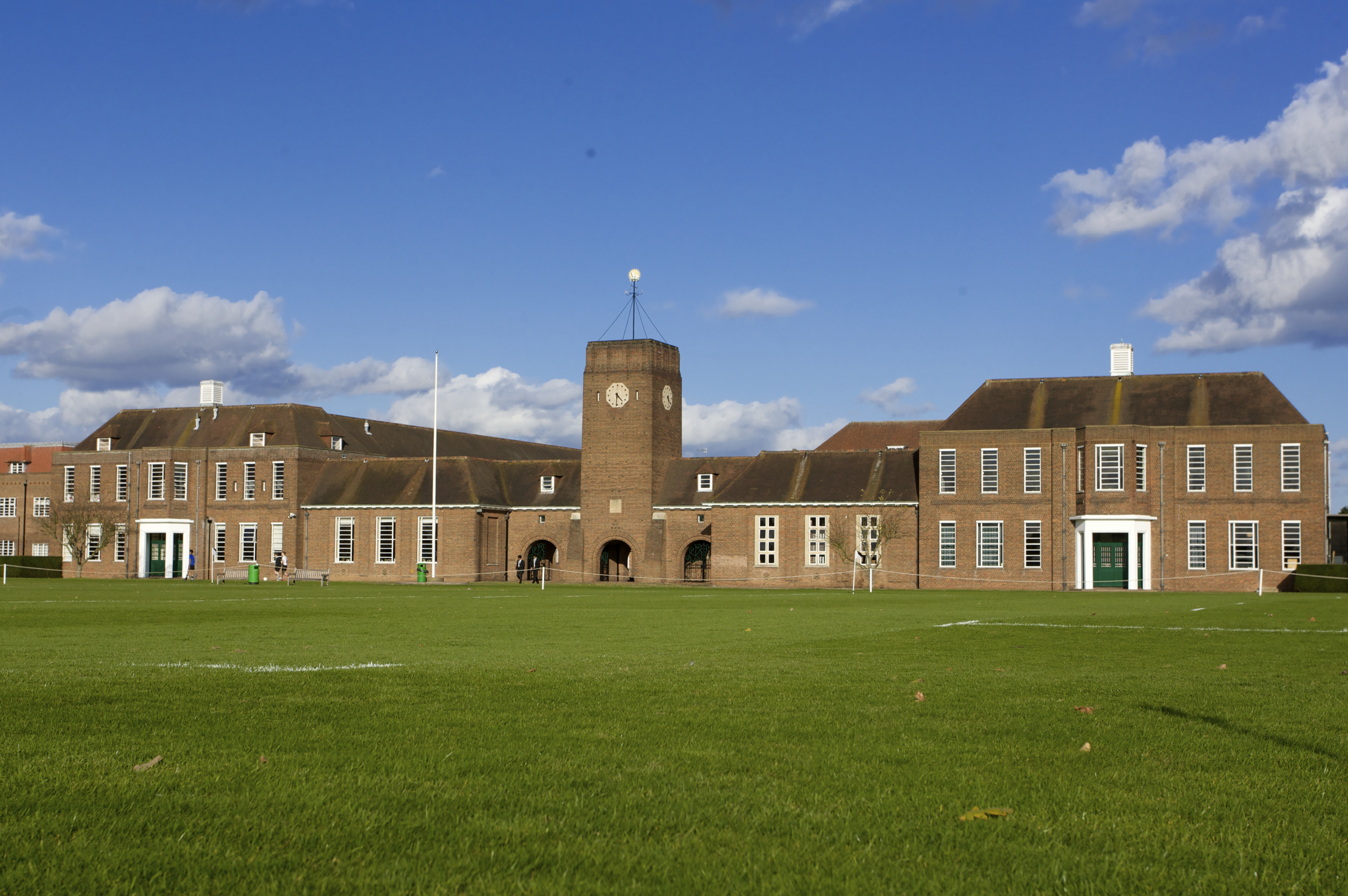
Merchant Taylors' School at Sandy Lodge

The Merchant Taylors' remains a school for boys only, and accepts pupils based upon an entrance examination, which the boys sit when they are either 11 or 16 years old. The school has a close relationship with its "sister school" St Helen's School, Northwood and the boys also work on occasion with girls from other schools, notably the Royal Masonic School for Girls.

The school's old boys, called Old Merchant Taylors (OMTs), include naturalists, poets, actors, academics, politicians, authors, sportsmen, and military figures, including three winners of the Victoria Cross award. OMTs include Lancelot Andrewes, who oversaw the translation of the King James' Bible; John Walter, founding editor of The Times; John Sulston, Nobel laureate in Physiology and Medicine; Marshal of the Royal Air Force The Lord Stirrup, former Chief of the Defence Staff; historian E. H. Carr; actor Boris Karloff; Lord Coggan, Archbishop of Canterbury, Robert Clive and many more. In the arts, OMTs have won Academy, Emmy and Grammy Awards. There is also a strong OMT presence in both Houses of Parliament.

=== Publications ===
The school has three main publications:

- Scissorum is a weekly online newsletter, the name being the Latin for tailor.
- Concordia is the school's magazine for alumni, the name being the first word of the motto.
- The Taylorian (published since 1868; now published annually) is a record of the highlights of the preceding academic year and includes the names of all who join the school or leave, the Head Master's speech on St Barnabas' Day (the School's Feast Day), sports reports, cultural reviews, artwork and essays (a selection of its highlights, Taylorian Analecta, is also published for alumni). The Taylorian Literary Supplement contains more extended literary prose and poetry.

Additionally, there are magazines produced by the students themselves. "The Dependent" is a termly satirical publication, largely focussed on school life.

=== Prefect body ===
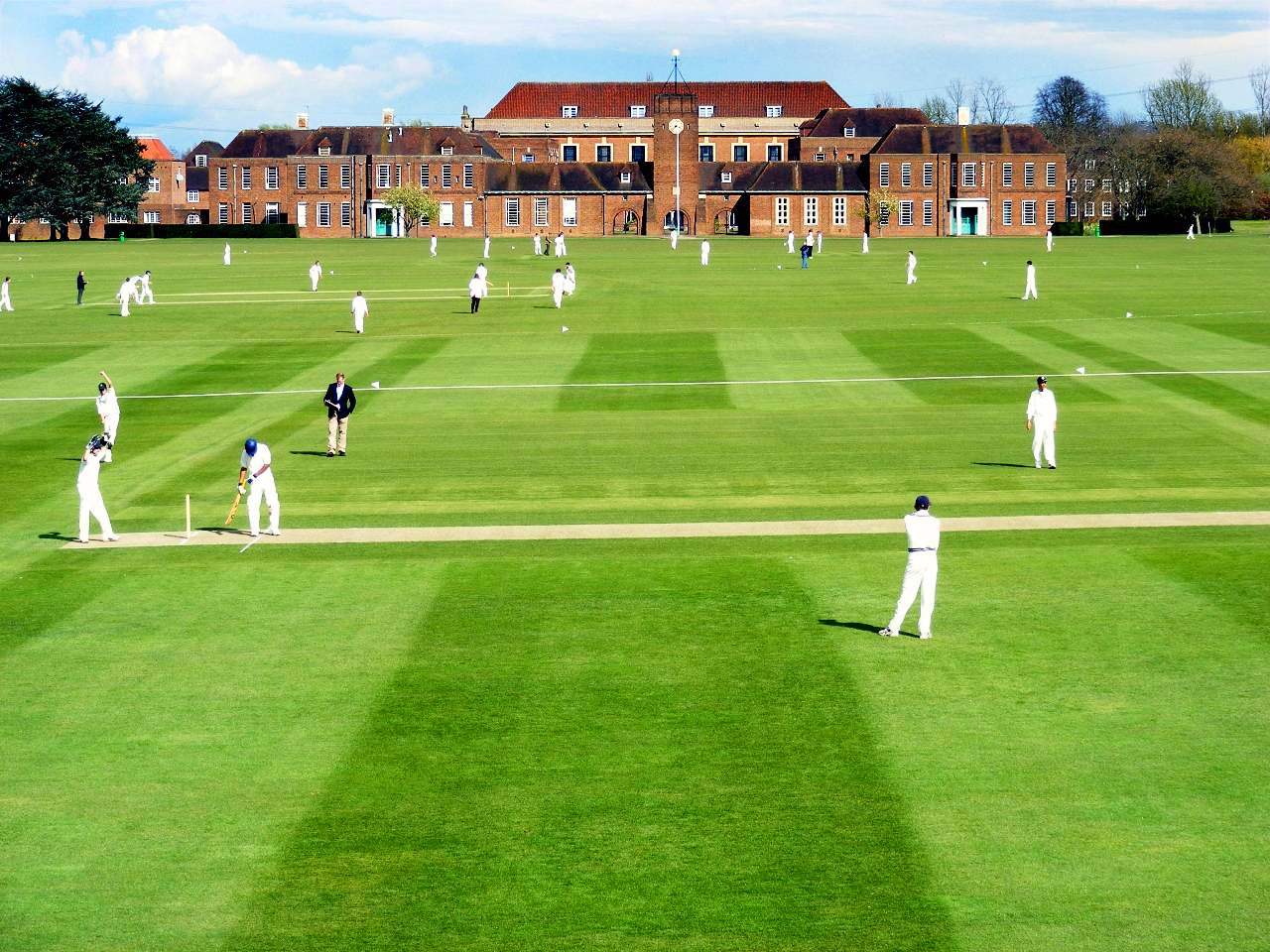
Cricket at Merchant Taylors'

The school prefect body, known as the JCR, is composed of members from the Upper Sixth Form and is divided into two groups: monitors (referred to as "the table") and prompters ("the bench"). Monitors serve as head prefects and typically number around 11, though this can fluctuate depending on the school's needs, such as during major events. They are led by the head monitor, who is supported by two second monitors and a senior monitor. The remaining members of the JCR, the prompters, number approximately 40 and are responsible for maintaining order within the school.

Although the powers and responsibilities of the JCR have diminished over recent decades, its members still enjoy certain privileges. For example, all JCR members are permitted to wear pinstriped shirts and jackets with silver buttons, while monitors are distinguished by gold-buttoned suits, with the style selected by committee.

Additionally, each house appoints a number of house prefects, chosen by the Head of House. These prefects play a key role in organizing house events and competitions within the school.

=== Merchant Taylors' Prep School ===
Merchant Taylors' Prep is Merchant Taylors' preparatory school for boys aged 3–13. It was originally called Northwood Prep School, but merged into Merchant Taylors' in 2015. Pupils from Merchant Taylors' Prep do not currently have to sit the entrance exams to enter MTS. Merchant Taylors' Prep also has many sister programmes with Merchant Taylors', through which they also share grounds, and occasional staff swaps.

=== Houses ===
There are eight houses at Merchant Taylors' School Recently, the name of Clive was changed to Raphael as a result of the George Floyd protests, due to Clive's involvement with the “foundation of the Empire”. Each house is led by a Head of House, formerly called a Housemaster.

House Name	Distinctive Letters	Founded	House Colour	Named for	Background
Spenser	S	1921	Yellow	Edmund Spenser	Poet in the reign of Queen Elizabeth I
Raphael renamed from Clive	R (formerly C)	1921 Renamed 2021	Red	Jack Raphael Robert Clive	Sportsman Governor of the Bengal Presidency
Hilles	H	1921	Dark Blue	Richard Hilles	Humanist & Protestant exile, co-founder of the school
Walter	WA	1946	Light Blue	John Walter	Founder of The Universal Register, now The Times newspaper
Mulcaster	MU	1946	Orange	Richard Mulcaster	First Head Master
White	WH	1921	White	Thomas White	Lord Mayor of London, Founder of the school and St John's College, Oxford
Andrewes	A	1946	Purple	Lancelot Andrewes	One of the translators of the Authorised Version of the Bible
The Manor of the Rose	MA	1946 (1933 as a boarding house)	Green		Name of original building at Suffolk Lane, and former boarding house at Sandy Lodge (1933–2000)

=== Forms and jargon ===
Merchant Taylors' uses a unique method in the naming of the form groups:

Year	Form	Abbreviation
7	3rd Form	3
8	Upper 3rd Form	U3
9	4th Form	4
10	Divisions	Divs
11	5th Form	5
12	Lower 6th Form	L6
13	Upper 6th Form	U6

The school's jargon links back to its foundation:

- The Lun – Tuck Shop
- The Quarter – Morning break (20 mins)
- The Hour – Afternoon break in which clubs are held (50 mins)
- Trials – Internal Examinations
- The Table – Monitors
- The Bench – Prompters
- Beak – Teacher (no longer in use)

=== Sport ===
The school has produced a number of sportsmen in cricket, rugby and other sports. For a listing of rugby internationals, see Old Merchant Taylors' FC.

==== Cricket ground ====
Merchant Taylors' School Ground
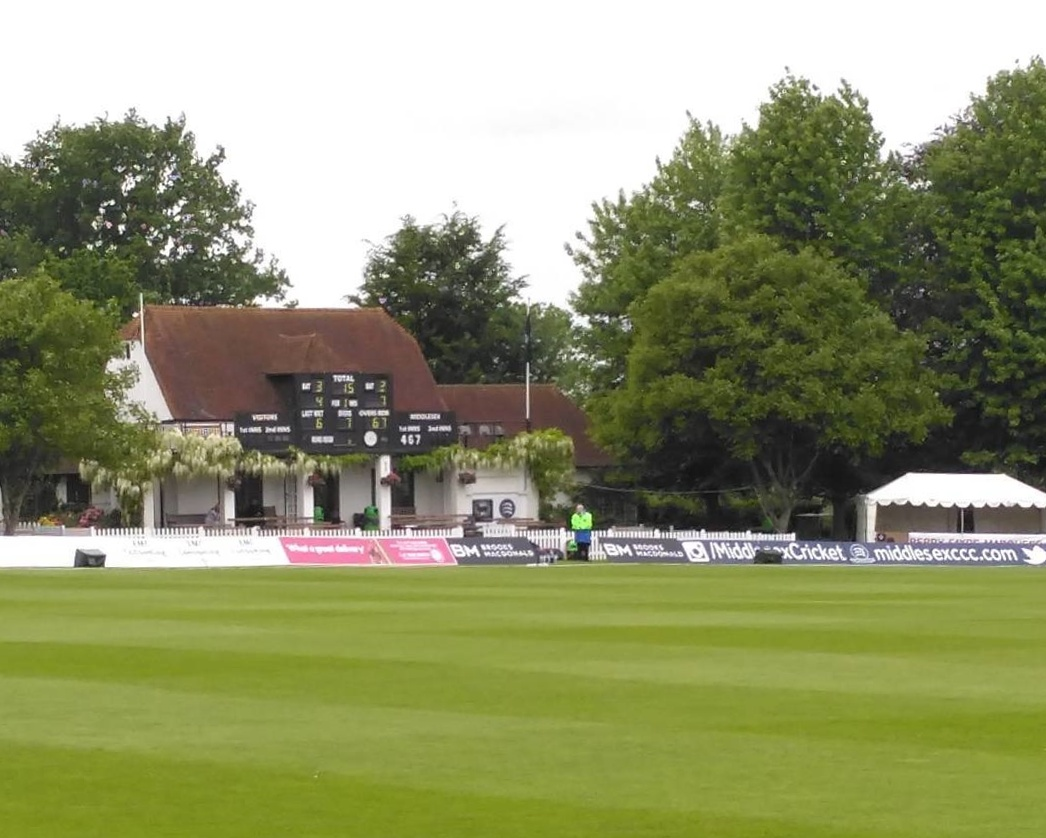
- Interactive map of Merchant Taylors' School Ground

Ground information
- Location: Northwood, England
- Country: England
- Establishment: 1892
- End names
- Benham End; Lake End

Team information
Middlesex County Cricket Club	(2012 – present)
- As of 8 July 2019; Source: Cricinfo

The first match recorded as having been played on the school's cricket ground was between the Norwood Club and the Marylebone Cricket Club in 1892. County Second XI cricket was first played there in 2002 when the Middlesex Second XI played the Kent Second XI.

The ground hosted its inaugural first-class match in 2012 when Middlesex played Durham MCCU, with the match ending in a draw. Middlesex's Sam Robson scored the first century at the ground. The ground was recently picked as a training ground for the Australian cricket team, and in 2018 the Indian cricket team, used the ground before playing in London.

== Head Masters ==
- 1561–1586 Richard Mulcaster
- 1586–1592 Henry Wilkinson
- 1592–1599 Edmund Smith
- 1599–1624 William Hayne
- 1625–1632 Nicholas Grey
- 1632–1634 John Edwards
- 1634–1644 William Staple
- 1644–1661 William Dugard
- 1661–1681 John Goad
- 1681–1686 John Hartcliffe
- 1686–1691 Ambrose Bonwicke
- 1691–1707 Matthew Shortyng
- 1707–1720 Thomas Parsell
- 1720–1731 Matthew Smith
- 1731–1760 John Criche
- 1760–1778 James Townley
- 1778–1783 Thomas Green
- 1783–1795 Samuel Bishop
- 1795–1819 Thomas Cherry
- 1819–1845 James William Bellamy
- 1845–1870 James Augustus Hessey
- 1870–1900 William Baker
- 1900–1927 John Arbuthnot Nairn
- 1927–1935 Spencer Stottesbury Gwatkin Leeson
- 1935–1946 Norman Pellew Birley
- 1946–1965 Hugh Elder
- 1965–1973 Brian Rees
- 1974–1981 Francis Davey
- 1981–1982 Harris Thorning
- 1982–1991 David Skipper
- 1991–2004 Jon Gabitass
- 2004–2013 Stephen Wright
- 2013–2026 Simon Everson
- 2026– Sam Baldock

== Notable alumni ==
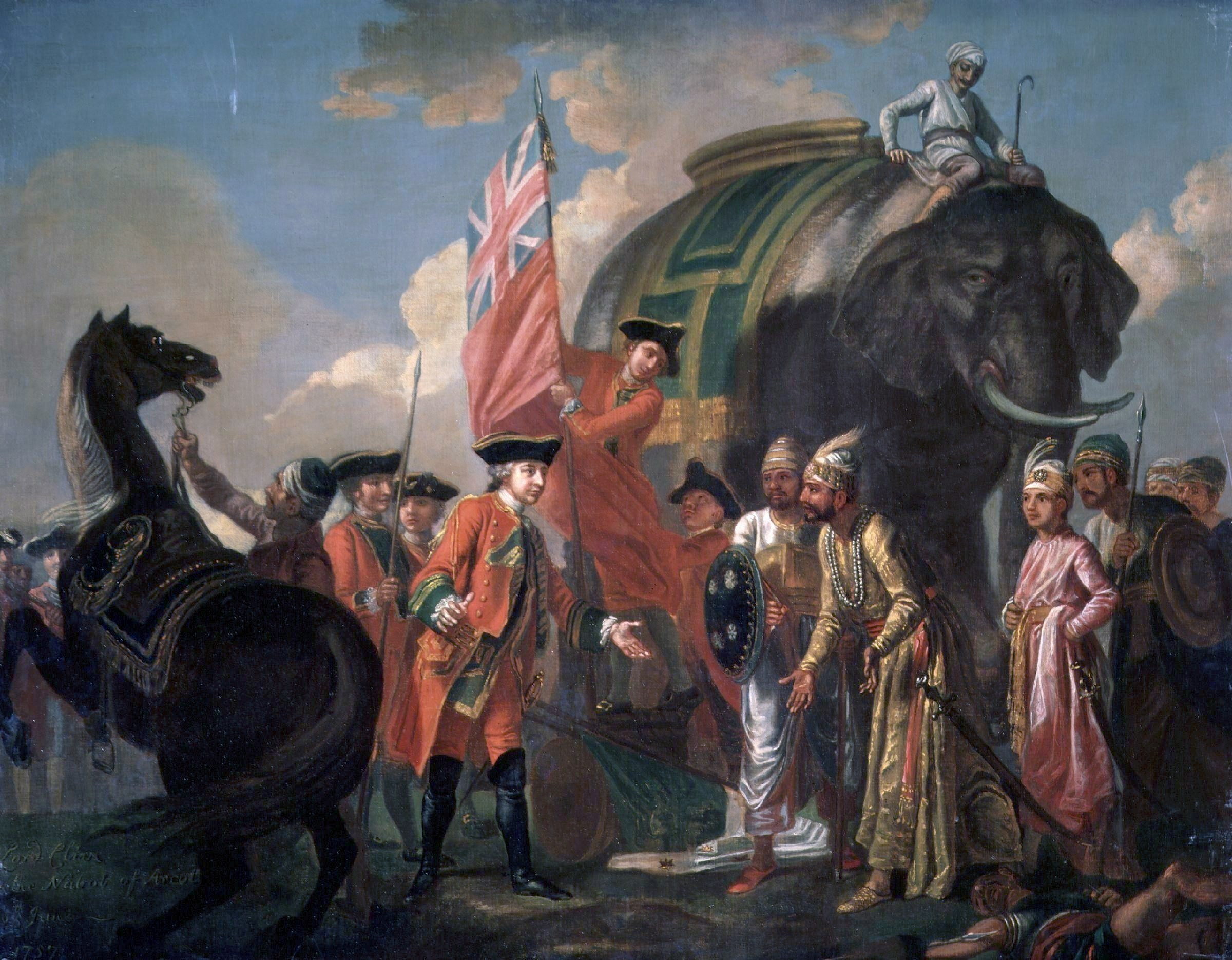
Robert Clive of Plassey, meeting with Mir Jafar after battle of Plassey, by Francis Hayman

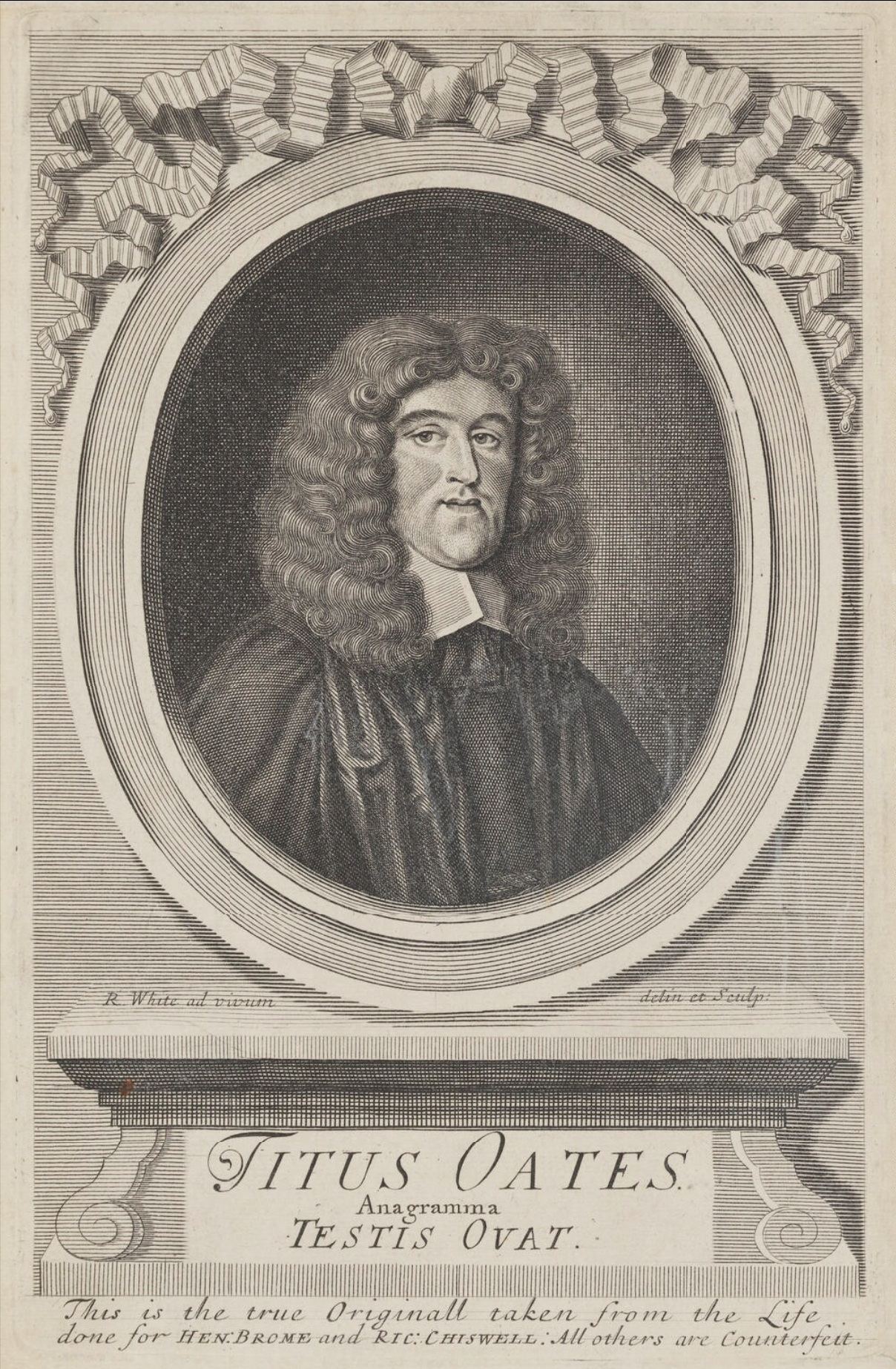
Titus Oates who was an English priest

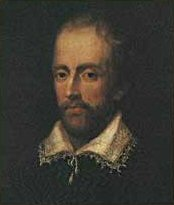
Edmund Spenser, author of The Faerie Queene (1590)

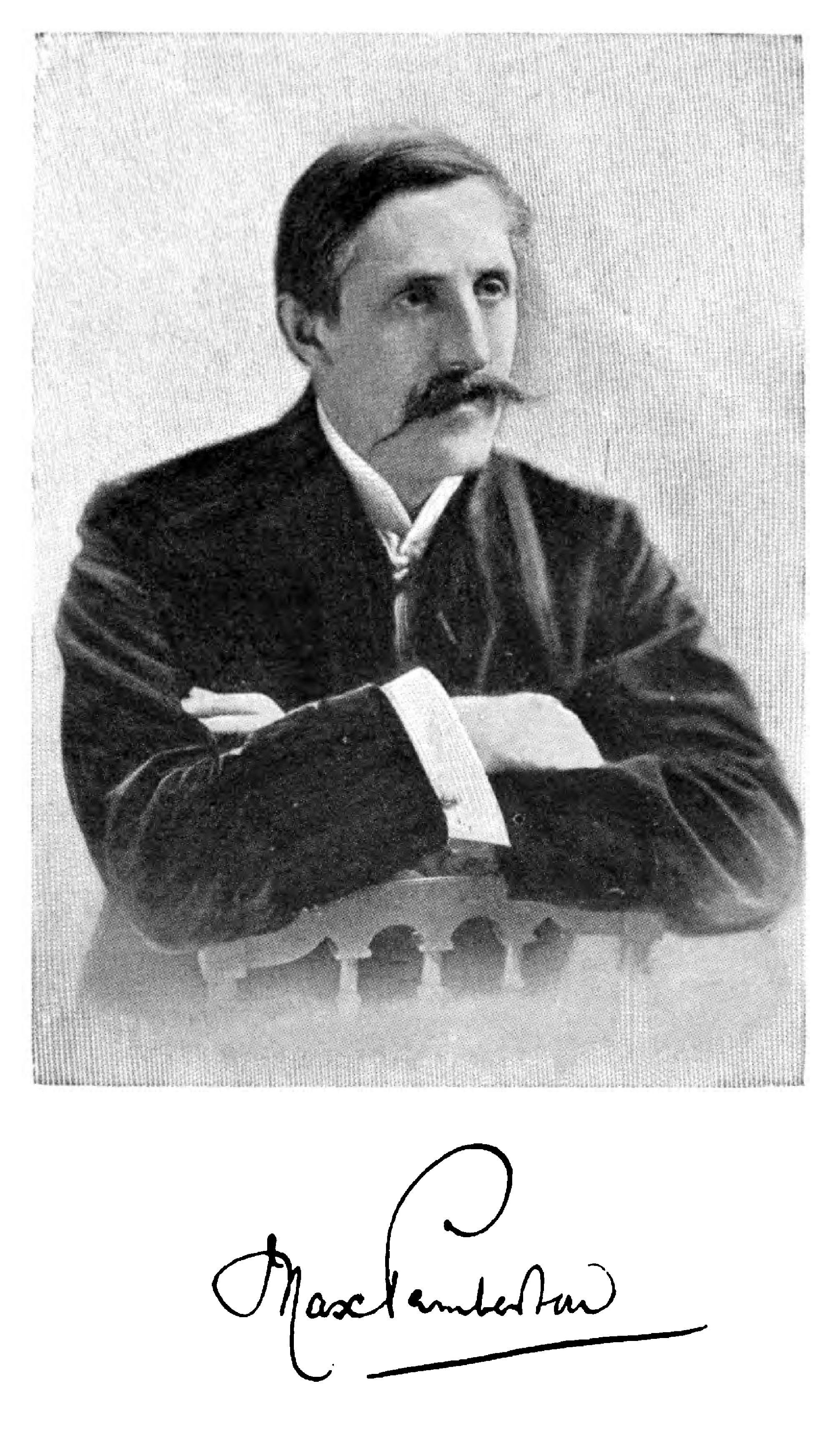
Sir Max Pemberton, author of The Iron Pirate (1893)

- Oladapo Afolayan – professional footballer
- Riz Ahmed – actor, comedian and musician
- Franklin Allen – economist
- Lancelot Andrewes, Bishop of Winchester and translator of the King James Bible
- Robin Askwith – actor, writer (1950 - )
- Neil Lawson Baker – artist, sculptor and photographer
- Bryan Balkwill – conductor
- John Beames – ICS, Author of "Memoirs of a Bengal Civilian"
- Martin Biddle – archaeologist
- Edward John Bolus – writer, civil servant, and priest
- Peter Broadbent – bishop of Willesden
- Montagu Burrows – British Army general
- Charles Crosthwaite – Chief Commissioner of the British Crown Colony of Burma
- Nigel Calder – populariser of science
- EH Carr, Marxist historian and philosopher of history
- Lynn Chadwick – sculptor, his work 'The Beast' adorns the school grounds
- Bob Chilcott – composer
- John Burland Chubb - Surveyor and architect
- Edgar Claxton MBE (1910–2000), British Railways Board engineer
- Robert, Lord Clive (expelled) (Clive of India)
- Donald Coggan – archbishop of Canterbury, 1974–1980
- Robert Buckley Comyn – Chief Justice of the Madras High Court 1835–42
- Lionel Cornish (1879–1939) - 1908 Olympic athlete
- Ronald Cove-Smith – surgeon and rugby player
- John Curchin – World War II flying ace
- Arthur Davenport (priest) – Anglican Archdeacon of Hobart 1880–1888
- William Dawes – Archbishop of York 1714–1724
- Warwick Deeping – novelist
- Dixon Denham – African explorer, Governor of Sierra Leone
- Thomas Dove Bishop of Peterborough 1601–1630
- Alan Duncan, politician
- Iorwerth Edwards, Egyptologist
- Edward Evans, 1st Baron Mountevans – admiral and explorer
- Vincent Evans – judge
- Herbert Fryer, composer, pianist, and pedagogue
- John George Nathaniel Gibbes – military officer and politician
- John Gilbert, Baron Gilbert – life peer
- Ronald Gurner – headmaster and writer
- William Malcolm Hailey, politician
- Henry R.H. Hall – Egyptologist and historian
- Jack Hargreaves – Television presenter and executive
- Gordon Harris (born 1964) – Cricketer
- Brian Harrison – historian
- Michael Harwood – British military figure
- Mehdi Hasan – journalist
- Robert Herrick (1591–1674) lyric poet
- Conn Iggulden – author, mainly historical fiction
- James Jeans, Astronomer Royal, physicist
- Robert Jones – politician
- William Joynson-Hicks, 1st Viscount Brentford – Home Secretary
- William Juxon – archbishop of Canterbury who attended Charles I at his execution in 1649
- Boris Karloff – actor
- H. R. F. Keating – Literary critic and author
- Matt Kirshen – Comedian
- Thomas Kyd – Renaissance dramatist
- Bertram Lloyd – activist and naturalist
- John Lort-Williams – judge and politician
- Michael Majerus (1954–2009) biologist
- Alfred Marshall – economist
- Paul Marshall – hedge fund manager
- Morris Martin – classical scholar
- Reginald Maudling – politician
- Michael McIntyre – comedian
- Adrian Mee – cricketer
- Joseph Merceron – corrupt magistrate and politician
- Bruce Montgomery – composer and crime writer
- Michael Moxon – chaplain to the Queen (1986–1998)
- Mick Mulligan – jazz musician
- Gilbert Murray – classicist
- Thomas Nott – Royalist army officer
- David Nutt – British publisher
- Mark Nye suffragan bishop of Pretoria
- Titus Oates – (1665–1666, expelled)
- Bernard Pagel – astronomer
- Samuel Palmer – landscape painter
- Jeremy Pang – chef, author, entrepreneur
- Donald Parry – cricketer
- Sir Max Pemberton – novelist, biographer, publisher and editor
- Martyn Percy – dean of Christ Church, Oxford
- John Perrin, one of the translators of the King James Bible
- Michael Peschardt – BBC foreign correspondent
- Walter Alison Phillips – historian
- Ashan Pillai – violist
- John Raphael, rugby union player and cricketer
- John Randall, politician
- Joseph Ray musician and producer
- Andrew Robathan – Conservative MP, Minister of State for Northern Ireland, ex Coldstream Guards Officer, SAS
- Herbert Roper Barrett – tennis player – Wimbledon doubles champion 1909, 1912, 1923 and GB Davis Cup team 1900
- Martin Rowson – political cartoonist
- Arthur Lindsay Sadler – professor of Oriental Studies
- Andrew Cunningham Scott, geologist
- Pat Sharp – radio & TV broadcaster
- Richard Sharp – Banker and Chairman of the BBC
- Nikesh Shukla – writer, novelist, broadcaster & podcaster
- Peter Selby – bishop of Worcester
- James Shirley – poet and playwright
- John Silvester – Recorder of London 1803–1822
- Harry Smith FBA – Egyptologist and academic
- Robert Smith – politician
- Jason Solomons – Film critic for BBC Radio
- Edmund Spenser – Renaissance poet, author of The Faerie Queene
- Jock Stirrup, Chief of the Defence Staff
- John Sulston – Nobel Laureate (2002)
- Paul Sussman – author, archaeologist and journalist
- Andrew Thomas, footballer, currently playing for Seattle Sounders FC
- Major W. Ian Thomas (Ian), DSO, TD – Royal Fusilier and preacher
- Samuel Thornton – Australian bishop
- John Timpson – radio presenter
- James Townley – dramatist and anonymous playwright (1714–1778)
- Frederick Treves – surgeon, medical pioneer
- John William Tripe – President of the Royal Meteorological Society (1871–72)
- James Twining – author
- Jonathan Turnbull – cricketer
- George Vasey – cricketer and educator
- William Wadd – 19th century surgeon and medical author
- John Walter – founder of The Times
- Augustine Warner Jr. – Virginia landowner
- John Webster, Renaissance dramatist, author of The Duchess of Malfi
- Oliver White – cricketer
- Bulstrode Whitelocke – English Civil War politician
- John J. Wild – pioneer of medical ultrasound diagnosis
- Tom Isaacs (fundraiser) - founder of The Cure Parkinson's Trust

== Notable members ==
- Richard Mulcaster – the school's first Head Master, an educationalist, thought by many to be the model for Shakespeare's Holofernes
- Baroness Butler-Sloss – first female Lord Justice of Appeal and, until 2004, was the highest-ranking female judge in the United Kingdom
- Spencer Leeson, Bishop of Peterborough, Head Master, instigated move of the school from Charterhouse Square to the current Sandy Lodge site
- Alexander Macmillan, 2nd Earl of Stockton – First Upper Warden of the Merchant Taylors' Company
- Geoffrey Holland, KCB, OMT – career civil servant who became Vice-Chancellor of the University of Exeter from 1994 to 2002; Chairman of the Governors until 2011
- Douglas MacDowell – classical scholar and the last Professor of Greek at University of Glasgow
- Peter Walker, Bishop of Ely, a figure at Oxford and Cambridge; Master at Merchant Taylors'

== See also ==
- St John's College, Oxford
- Merchant Taylors' Company
