= Ready Steady Cook =

BBC daytime TV cooking game show

- Third logo, used from 2004 to 2010
- Genre: Cooking show
- Presented by: Fern Britton (1994–2000); Ainsley Harriott (2000–2010); Rylan Clark (2020–2021)
- Country of origin: United Kingdom
- Original language: English
- No. of series: 32
- No. of episodes: 1,888

Production
- Production locations: Fountain Studios, New Malden (1994–1999); Capital Studios (1999–2008); BBC Television Centre (2008–2010); BBC Pacific Quay (2020–2021)
- Running time: 30 minutes (1994–2000); 45 minutes (2000–2010, 2020–2021)
- Production companies: Bazal Productions (1994–2001); Endemol UK Productions (2002–2006); Cheetah Television (2006–2010); Remarkable Entertainment (2020–2021)

Original release
- Network: BBC Two; BBC One (1997–2003)
- Release: 24 October 1994 – 2 February 2010
- Network: BBC One
- Release: 2 March 2020 – 15 April 2021

Related
- MasterChef

Ready Steady Cook is a BBC daytime TV cooking game show. It debuted on 24 October 1994 and the last original edition was broadcast on 2 February 2010. The programme was hosted by Fern Britton from 1994 until 2000 when celebrity chef Ainsley Harriott became the new host. In August 2000, when Harriott took over, the duration of the programme was extended from 30 to 45 minutes.

On 2 September 2019, it was confirmed that Rylan Clark would host a revived daytime series on BBC One in 2020. On 7 September 2021, it was announced by the BBC that the series ended after two series.

== Format ==
=== Ingredients ===
Two members of the public provided two celebrity chefs with a bag of ingredients they had bought, usually to a set budget of £5. Essential ingredients such as bread, milk, eggs etc. are provided by the show. The two teams were designated "red tomato" and "green pepper" (referred to as "red kitchen" and "green kitchen" after the August 2007 revamp, though the tomato and pepper motifs still featured on the guests' aprons and in the show's logo).

Occasionally, the permitted budget was increased: a so-called Bistro Bag allowed for ingredients of up to £7.50, while the Gourmet Bag could have a value of up to £10. On some occasions, they used a £3.50 Budget Bag. Also on a few shows, a Lucky Dip Bag was used, which contained ten items. The chef closed their eyes and picked out half of the items at the beginning. At the halfway mark, the chef randomly picked a sixth item, which might have helped or hindered the chef. The chefs had no prior knowledge of the ingredients they had to prepare. Another format was used on occasion in which both kitchens were given the same ingredients and the toss of a red and green die determined who had first pick.

=== The Main Course ===
The chefs had to make several dishes out of the said ingredients in 20 minutes, with the help of the contestants and the programme host. As the contestants taste the prepared food, the host asks the chef some questions about their dish. Prior to the September 2006 season it was customary for the chefs to name their creations, which usually included a pun.

The preparations were voted on by the studio audience, who each held up a card showing either a red tomato or green pepper. In the newer episodes, the audience members pushed a button on their seat keypad to indicate who they would like to win. The winner received a cash prize of £100, which celebrity guests donated to charity (an example the regular guests sometimes followed) but this was changed to a plate towards the end of the series. The runner-up used to receive a hamper which included a variety of items, such as a set of knives, pasta and sauces, olive oil and balsamic vinegar but later received a Ready Steady Cook mug due to budget restraints.

=== Quickie bag ===
The quickie bag section of the show then followed. This was introduced in 2000, the same year Ainsley Harriott became presenter (having previously been one of the celebrity chefs on the programme during Fern Britton's tenure as host), extending the programme from 30 to 45 minutes. The contents of the quickie bag used to be decided on by the series producer and a home economist. Their decision was based on produce that was currently in season or unusual ingredients that had not featured on the show recently. In late August 2007, the quickie bag changed format with the bag being brought in by an audience member, who challenged the chefs to prepare the dish.

The two chefs each had a chance to describe what they would cook using the bag of ingredients and the audience members voted to choose which dish they would like to see prepared. The winner then had 10 minutes to complete the described dishes, with the help of the other chef and Ainsley. The hectic preparation of the chosen chef's suggested dishes often includes a slight element of chaos and ad-libbing along the way. A viewer's question relating to a cooking problem is usually put to the chefs, further adding to the pressure upon them to complete their dishes in the time allowed.

=== Variations on the format ===
- Classic Bag – The original format where the contestant brought in a bag of ingredients costing up to £5.
- Budget Bag – Similar to the 'Classic Bag' but the ingredients could only cost up to £3.50.
- Bistro Bag – Ingredients worth £7.50.
- Gourmet Bag – Worth £10.
- Doubling Up Bag – Both contestants bring in the same ingredients. The host used a coin or die with a Green Pepper and Red Tomato on to decide which chef would decide what to do with the ingredients first. The other chef must do something different.
- Forfeit Bag – The chefs had to choose a card at random with a forfeit which prohibited their use of a certain store cupboard ingredient such as No Fresh Herbs, No Spices, No Citrus or No Wine.
- Gamble Bag – The chefs were presented with three mystery ingredients and are given the opportunity to swap one of their ingredients with one of these mystery ingredients. They do not have to swap but if they do, they cannot change their minds once the new ingredient is revealed.
- Lucky Dip – The Chefs were presented with a bag of ten items from which they had to pick five at random. After 10 minutes had passed, they then chose a sixth ingredient, which depending on what the chef has started cooking, can help or hinder them.

== Celebrity Ready Steady Cook ==
Originally as a spin-off that ran alongside the original, Celebrity Ready Steady Cook had celebrities, often competing against a family member or friend, provide the bag of ingredients to the same budget of £5. Later series would see the public completely replaced with celebrity guests.

Celebrity appearances include: David Tennant, Wendy Richard, Kate Winslet, Honor Blackman, James May, Richard Hammond, Paul O'Grady as alter-ego Lily Savage, Cliff Richard, Twiggy, Rakie Ayola, Fiona Bruce, Gail Porter, Midge Ure, Edd China, Amanda Redman, Ade Edmondson and Alan Davies.

== Featured chefs ==
Original version:

- Ross Burden
- Gino D'Acampo
- Garrey Dawson
- James Martin
- Nick Nairn
- Paul Rankin
- James Tanner
- Tony Tobin
- Brian Turner
- Phil Vickery
- Lesley Waters
- Kevin Woodford
- Antony Worrall Thompson

== Revived series ==
In September 2019, the BBC announced that Ready Steady Cook would return.

Returning in March 2020, Celebrity MasterChef finalist Rylan Clark serves as host. He is joined by chefs Ellis Barrie, Romy Gill, Anna Haugh, Akis Petretzikis, and Mike Reid.

Ready Steady Cook introduced various sustainability efforts, including favouring glass over plastic, initiating a recycling programme, donating leftover food to a local food bank, and using locally sourced seasonal ingredients and Fair Trade items when available.

The second series following the revival started airing in March 2021. Clark returned as host, with the chef team largely remaining the same. Jeremy Pang replaced Mike Reid as Reid was unable to return to the UK from Australia during the pandemic. For the first time, the chefs decided the winner as the show was filmed without an audience.

== Series overview ==
=== Original series ===
| Series | Start date | End date | Episodes |
|---|---|---|---|
| 1 | 24 October 1994 | 1 May 1995 | 73 |
| 1 | 1 June 1995 | | 73 |
| 2 | 2 May 1995 | 31 May 1995 | 98 |
| 2 | 2 June 1995 | 14 March 1996 | 98 |
| 2 | 18 March 1996 | 20 March 1996 | 98 |
| 2 | 16 April 1996 | | 98 |
| 3 | 15 March 1996 | | 85 |
| 3 | 21 March 1996 | 15 April 1996 | 85 |
| 3 | 17 April 1996 | 13 September 1996 | 85 |
| 3 | 15 October 1996 | | 85 |
| 3 | 28 February 1997 | 6 March 1997 | 85 |
| 3 | 10 March 1997 | | 85 |
| 3 | 14 March 1997 | | 85 |
| 3 | 18 March 1997 | 20 March 1997 | 85 |
| 3 | 24 March 1997 | 27 March 1997 | 85 |
| 3 | 9 April 1997 | | 85 |
| 3 | 11 April 1997 | 17 April 1997 | 85 |
| 3 | 6 May 1997 | 7 May 1997 | 85 |
| 3 | 13 May 1997 | 20 May 1997 | 85 |
| 3 | 27 May 1997 | 2 June 1997 | 85 |
| 3 | 4 June 1997 | 16 June 1997 | 85 |
| 3 | 20 August 1997 | 22 August 1997 | 85 |
| 4 | 16 September 1996 | 14 October 1996 | 96 |
| 4 | 16 October 1996 | 27 February 1997 | 96 |
| 4 | 7 March 1997 | | 96 |
| 4 | 11 March 1997 | 13 March 1997 | 96 |
| 4 | 17 March 1997 | | 96 |
| 4 | 21 March 1997 | | 96 |
| 4 | 1 April 1997 | 8 April 1997 | 96 |
| 4 | 10 April 1997 | | 96 |
| 4 | 18 April 1997 | | 96 |
| 4 | 12 May 1997 | | 96 |
| 4 | 21 May 1997 | 22 May 1997 | 96 |
| 4 | 3 June 1997 | | 96 |
| 4 | 19 June 1997 | | 96 |
| 5 | 1 September 1997 | 9 September 1998 | 139 |
| 5 | 14 September 1999 | 15 September 1998 | 139 |
| 6 | 10 September 1998 | | 105 |
| 6 | 16 September 1998 | 13 July 1999 | 105 |
| 7 | 6 September 1999 | 30 May 2000 | 108 |
| 8 | 14 August 2000 | 5 January 2001 | 65 |
| 9 | 22 January 2001 | 30 July 2001 | 65 |
| 10 | 3 September 2001 | 21 December 2001 | 55 |
| 11 | 21 January 2002 | 28 May 2002 | 47 |
| 12 | 12 August 2002 | 6 May 2003 | 108 |
| 13 | 18 August 2003 | 26 May 2004 | 124 |
| 14 | 31 August 2004 | 10 May 2005 | 123 |
| 15 | 5 September 2005 | 10 May 2006 | 120 |
| 16 | 18 September 2006 | 20 April 2007 | 123 |
| 17 | 27 August 2007 | 26 October 2007 | 47 |
| 18 | 11 February 2008 | 16 May 2008 | 57 |
| 19 | 19 May 2008 | 7 October 2008 | 32 |
| 20 | 19 January 2009 | 15 June 2009 | 40 |
| 21 | 24 November 2009 | 2 February 2010 | 35 |

=== Revived series ===
| Series | Start date | End date | Episodes | Presenter |
|---|---|---|---|---|
| 1 | 2 March 2020 | 27 March 2020 | 20 | Rylan Clark |
| 2 | 1 March 2021 | 15 April 2021 | 30 | Rylan Clark |

=== Celebrity Ready Steady Cook ===
| Series | Start date | End date | Episodes |
|---|---|---|---|
| 1 | 11 July 1997 | 29 August 1997 | 8 |
| 2 | 24 December 1997 | 25 February 1998 | 11 |
| 2 | 8 July 1998 | | 11 |
| 2 | 12 February 1999 | | 11 |
| 3 | 4 March 1998 | | 9 |
| 3 | 10 July 1998 | 4 September 1998 | 9 |
| 4 | 7 October 1998 | 5 February 1999 | 12 |
| 5 | 11 June 1999 | 15 December 1999 | 9 |
| 6 | 27 December 1999 | 24 May 2000 | 10 |
| 7 | 19 June 2000 | 2 July 2000 | 2 |
| 8 | 18 October 2000 | 29 June 2001 | 21 |
| 9 | 8 September 2001 | 19 June 2002 | 19 |
| 10 | 6 November 2002 | 3 January 2003 | 2 |

=== Specials ===
| Date | Entitle | Presenter |
|---|---|---|
| 12 February 2002 | Happy Birthday! | Ainsley Harriott |
| 13 February 2002 | Happy Birthday! | Ainsley Harriott |
| 23 December 2004 | Christmas Special | Ainsley Harriott |
| 12 July 2006 | Sport Relief Special | Ainsley Harriott |
| 17 March 2021 | Red Nose Day Special | Rylan Clark |

==== Daytime Celebrity Christmas specials ====
| Series | Start date | End date | Episodes | Presenter |
|---|---|---|---|---|
| 1 | 27 December 2002 | 3 January 2003 | 7 | Ainsley Harriott |
| 2 | 26 December 2003 | 31 December 2003 | 5 | Ainsley Harriott |

== International versions ==
| Country | Title | Broadcaster | Presenter(s) | Premiere | Finale |
|---|---|---|---|---|---|
| Australia | Ready Steady Cook | Network Ten | Nick Stratford (2005); Peter Everett (2006–2011); Colin Lane (2011–2013); Miguel Maestre (2024) | 4 April 2005; 8 March 2024 | 12 December 2013; 20 July 2024 |
| Croatia | Kruške i jabuke | HRT | Karmela Vukov-Colić; Oliver Mlakar (1999); Duško Ćurlić (1999–2002, 2015–2016); Barbara Kolar (2000, 2005); Mirjana Rogina (2002–2003) | 1999; 2015 | 2005; 2016 |
| Finland | Kokkisota | MTV3 (1999–2021); Star Channel (2025–present) | Sikke Sumari (1999–2004, 2017–2021); Anni Ihamäki (2025–present) | 25 February 1999; 19 January 2017; 30 September 2025 | 13 May 2004; 5 August 2021 present |
| Germany | Kochduell | VOX | Britta von Lojewski | 1 September 1997 | 27 August 2005 |
| Greece | Στην κουζίνα ολοταχώς Stin kouzina olotahos | Mega Channel | Ilias Mamalakis | 2001 | 2004 |
| Greece | Ready, Steady, Cook | Alpha TV | Akis Petretzikis | 8 May 2017 | 10 July 2017 |
| Italy | La prova del cuoco | Rai 1 | Antonella Clerici (2000–2008; 2010–2018); Elisa Isoardi (2008–2010; 2018–2020) | 2 October 2000 | 26 June 2020 |
| New Zealand | Woolworth's Ready Steady Cook | TV3 (1998); TVNZ (1999, 2005) | Kerre Woodham (1998–1999); Clayton Carrick-Leslie (2005) | 1998; 2005 | 1999; 2005 |
| North Macedonia | Брза кујна Brza kujna | Sitel TV | Sanja Saveska | 2015 | present |
| Poland | SmaczneGO! Gotowi do Gotowania. Start! | TVP 2 | Olga Bończyk (2007–2008); Marzena Rogalska (2019) | 10 March 2007; 9 September 2019 | 24 May 2008; 26 November 2019 |
| South Africa | Ready, Steady, Cook | SABC | Moshi Ndiki | 17 March 2024 | present |
| Turkey | Bence Benim Annem | Show TV | Berna Laçin | 4 March 2013 | 18 April 2013 |
| United States | Ready... Set... Cook! | Food Network | Robin Young (1995–1996); Sissy Biggers (1996–2000); Ainsley Harriott (2000–2001) | 2 October 1995 | 1 January 2001 |

== Books ==
- Ready Steady Cook: The 10 Minute Cookbook. BBC Books. 28 September 2006. ISBN 978-0-563-49389-1.
- Ready Steady Cook 365. BBC Books. 3 September 2009. ISBN 978-1-84607-801-9.
