= Jonathan Turnbull =

English cricketer (born 1962)

Personal information
- Full name: Jonathan Richard Turnbull
- Born: 13 November 1962 (age 63); Northwood, Middlesex, England
- Batting: Right-handed
- Bowling: Right-arm medium

Domestic team information
- Years: Team
- 1983–1984: Oxford University

Career statistics
Competition	First-class
Matches	12
Runs scored	17
Batting average	1.88
100s/50s	–/–
Top score	6
Balls bowled	1,326
Wickets	15
Bowling average	51.86
5 wickets in innings	–
10 wickets in match	–
Best bowling	4/51
Catches/stumpings	8/–
- Source: Cricinfo, 10 April 2020

Jonathan Richard Turnbull (born 13 November 1962) is an English former first-class cricketer.

Turnbull was born at Northwood in November 1962. He was educated at Merchant Taylors' School, before going up to Jesus College, Oxford. While studying at Oxford, he played first-class cricket for Oxford University in 1983 and 1984, making twelve appearances against county opposition. Playing as a right-arm medium pace bowler, Turnbull took 15 wickets at an average of 51.86 in his twelve matches, with best figures of 4 for 51.
