= Romy Gill =

British-Indian chef

Romy Gill MBE
- Born: West Bengal, India
- Culinary career
- Cooking style: Indian cuisine
- Current restaurant
- Romy's Kitchen (closed 2019)
- Website: www.romygill.com

Romy Gill MBE is a British-Indian chef, food writer, author and broadcaster. She was the owner and head chef at Romy's Kitchen in Thornbury, South Gloucestershire. In 2016 she was appointed an MBE in the Queen's 90th birthday honours list. Gill has amassed a number of television and radio appearances, including presenting, co-presenting and judging roles. She regularly contributes to national and international publications, including The New York Times, The Sunday Times and The Daily Telegraph.

Gill has written three cookbooks - Zaika: Vegan recipes from India, which was published in September 2019, On The Himalayan Trail: Recipes and Stories from Kashmir to Ladakh, which was published in Spring 2022, and Romy Gill's India: Recipes from Home, which was published in September 2024.

== Early life and inspirations ==
Gill grew up in Burnpur, West Bengal, India, where she learned to cook from her mother.

When Gill moved to the UK in 1993, she began hosting dinner parties for friends, later running cookery classes, which led to her launching her own range of sauces, pickles, chutneys and spice mixes.

She gave cookery demonstrations both in England and further afield, and in September 2013 she opened her first restaurant, Romy's Kitchen.

== Style of cooking ==
Gill's style of Indian cooking is very different from that found at the majority of Indian restaurants in the UK. She avoids the use of unnatural food colourings, and is a fan of combining Indian and British cuisine.

She combines spices and flavours that she grew up with in India with ingredients that she was only introduced to when she moved to the UK, creating dishes such as gurnard cooked in coconut milk, tomatoes, tomato puree, ginger, garlic and her own spice blend; and monkfish marinated in turmeric and lemon juice, then cooked with onions, ginger, garlic, mustard seeds, 5 spice mix paste and her own spices.

== Restaurant ==
Gill opened her first restaurant, Romy's Kitchen, in Thornbury, South Gloucestershire in September 2013.

In order to open her restaurant, Gill applied to a number of banks for a loan, but was turned down by every one apart from NatWest, providing her with the business loan that she needed to get her restaurant underway, leading her to be featured on the BBC News in a segment about the struggles that entrepreneurs face when trying to raise the necessary funds to start a new, local business.

The restaurant closed in August 2019.

== Awards and achievements ==
In 2014 Gill was shortlisted for the 15th Asian Women of Achievement Awards (AWA), which celebrate women who make an "outstanding contribution to our culture and economy". In the same year, her restaurant, Romy's Kitchen, was shortlisted as "Best Newcomer" in the British Curry Awards.

Gill was appointed Member of the Order of the British Empire (MBE) in the 2016 Birthday Honours for services to the hospitality industry.

== Cookery demonstrations and other events ==
Gill demonstrates her cooking at festivals both in the UK and abroad. In the UK, she has given demonstrations at the Foodies Festival, Grand Designs exhibitions and at food and cultural festivals in Abu Dhabi, New York City and other locations.

In addition, she gives talks and cookery demonstrations in schools where she discusses how food is cultivated, the importance of eating with the seasons and the impact of food on the environment.

Gill, along with two other female Indian chefs and Atul Kochhar, gave a demonstration at Kochhar's restaurant, Benares, in November 2012 to raise money for charity, and is an avid fundraiser for charity Frank Water.

Gill has also appeared on BBC Radio Bristol with Laura Rawlings, and has appeared in a video where she taught rugby star Olly Barkley how to cook Indian food.

In May 2014, Romy was heavily involved with the Bristol Food Connections festival: a citywide celebration of local food and drink. Along with other top chefs such as Martin Blunos, Tom Kerridge and Ken Hom, Romy took to the BBC Stars' Kitchen to give live demos of some of her popular recipes. During the Bristol Food Connections festival, Romy was also a guest on Saturday Live, alongside Jay Rayner and others.

In 2016, Romy was a guest chef at Carousel London, and returned for another stint a year later.

In 2017, Romy gave demonstrations at a range of festivals, including the BBC Good Food Show, the Abergavenny Food Festival, the Big Feastival, Dartmouth Food Festival and the Padstow Christmas Festival.

Gill was invited to speak at The MAD Symposium 2018 and, in February 2020, was invited to cook at the prestigious James Beard Foundation in New York.

In 2025 she has appeared at The Hay Festival, The Appledore Book Festival and The Cheltenham Literature Festival.

== Food writing ==
Romy contributes regularly to food publications such as Crumbs, Olive, Delicious, Saveur and Food52, and has featured in The Guardian, where she had a residency in April 2016.

She has a number of recipes on the BBC Food website, as well as having published recipes and articles in The Times, The Telegraph, The New York Times Today, You Magazine, Ocado, The Independent, The Observer, Borough Market, Saveur and The Financial Times.

In 2017, Romy travelled to India with Suitcase Magazine, where she explored and wrote articles on Ladakh and the Andaman and Nicobar Islands. In 2022, to coincide with the publication of her second cookbook, SUITCASE published a piece by Romy about The Himalayan Trail.

Romy Gill is the author of three cookbooks.

Her first cookbook, Zaika: Vegan recipes from India, was published in 2019. Her second cookbook, On The Himalayan Trail: Recipes and Stories from Kashmir to Ladakh, was published in spring 2022. September 2024 saw the publication of her third cookbook, Romy Gill's India: Recipes from Home.

== Television appearances ==
In March 2020, she began to appear on Ready Steady Cook., where she was one of the chefs until 2022. She has also previously appeared on Sunday Brunch, The One Show, Countryfile (including a regular slot interviewing and cooking with children who love food, Celebrity MasterChef 2016, Hairy Bikers Comfort Food, Saturday Morning with James Martin, Morning Live, Front Row (radio programme) and many more. She is also a regular on The Food Programme on BBC Radio 4, where she has appeared as a judge, a presenter and a co-presenter, and in 2021 and 2022, has appeared on Steph's Packed Lunch hosted by Steph McGovern on Channel 4.

She has featured as the subject of a film short on "Family Dinners" on Food Network UK,. She has also appeared as a celebrity contestant on Celebrity Mastermind, Pointless Celebrities and The Weakest Link.

Romy's television appearances also include those as a special guest on BBC's Strictly - It Takes Two in November 2024, as well as appearing as an expert in the finale of BBC's The Apprentice in 2025.

On June 13, 2025, Romy Gill appeared on The One Show in her first presentation strand for the programme, exploring the story of a beloved curry house in Stockport. The segment, filmed with director Phil, offered viewers an engaging look at the people, flavours, and history behind this local culinary gem.

== Radio appearances ==
Romy has appeared frequently on the radio - as a presenter, a co-presenter and a judge. She has discussed whether a food project from India could solve the UK's holiday hunger problem, taught Woman's Hour listeners to make vegetarian samosas, and has shared her recipe for spicy chickpeas on BBC Radio 4. Other radio interview topics include Madhur Jaffrey, issues with the restaurant trade, food during the COVID-19 outbreak and lockdowns, pumpkins and winter squash, food and mental health and mangoes.

She has appeared on several other BBC Radio 4 programmes, including Pick of the Week, as well as on Beyond Belief, talking about 'Faithful Food'. She has discussed poet Amrita Pritam on Great Lives, and joined Harriett Gilbert on A Good Read.

== Personal life ==
Gill lives in Thornbury, South Gloucestershire with her husband and two daughters.

She is an active runner.
