= Ready... Set... Cook! =

1995–2001 American TV series

- Presented by: Robin Young (1995–1996); Sissy Biggers (1996–2000); Ainsley Harriott (2000–2001)

Original release
- Network: Food Network
- Release: October 2, 1995 – January 1, 2001

Ready... Set... Cook! is a cooking game show that debuted on the Food Network in the United States on October 2, 1995. The show's format was based upon the British series Ready Steady Cook, and originally hosted by television personality Robin Young.

== Hosts ==
Young hosted through September 27, 1996. The following Monday, she was replaced by another TV personality, Sissy Biggers. In 2000, Biggers was replaced by British Ready Steady Cook presenter Ainsley Harriott.

== Gameplay ==
Two well-known chefs (usually representing their restaurants) along with two members of the studio audience (one per chef) competed as teams to prepare the best meal. One was called "Red Tomatoes", the other "Green Peppers". The contestants were then each given $10.00 to spend on whatever they wanted for the chefs to prepare for a meal.

The teams were given 20 minutes (later reduced to 18 minutes) to make a meal using the ingredients they had and the usual items found in a kitchen pantry. The host would meanwhile move back and forth between the teams to ask questions about the meals being produced.

When time ran out, each team explained the dish they had prepared, after which the audience would vote by holding cards (one per audience member, a tomato on one side and a green pepper on the other) to show which team's meal they liked best. The team with the higher number of votes won the game, with both contestants winning kitchen appliances and/or cookware.
