= William Baker (headmaster) =

Headmaster of Merchant Taylors' School from 1870 to 1900

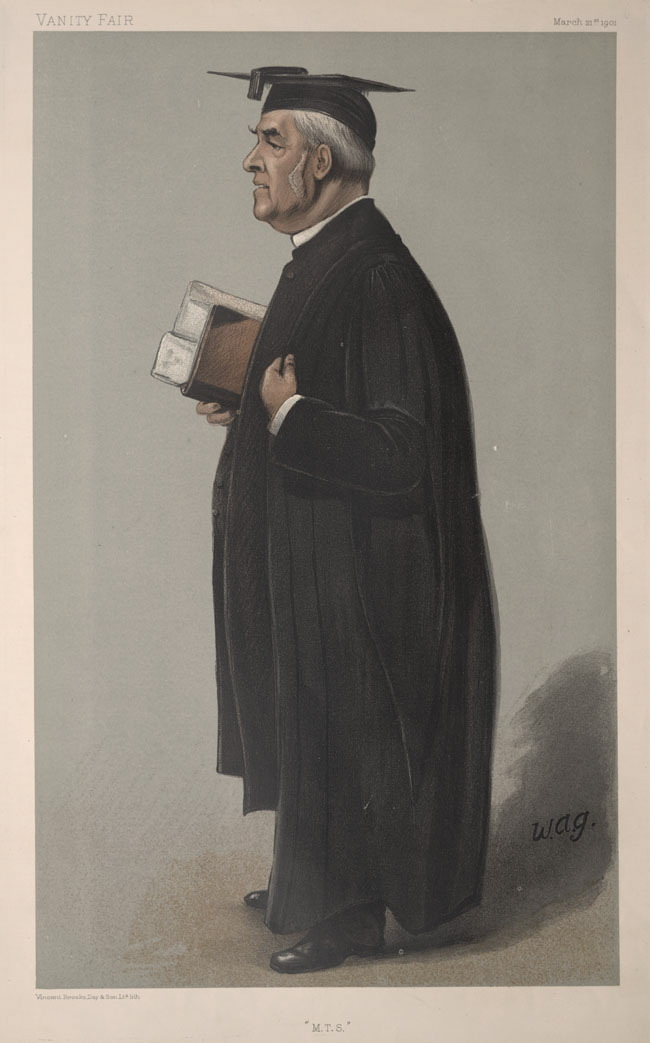
"MTS". Rev. William Baker by "wag" (Arthur George Witherby) in Vanity Fair, 21 March 1901

Rev. William Baker D.D. (18 December 1841, in Reigate – 1910) was headmaster at Merchant Taylors' School (MTS) for three decades.

Baker matriculated on 25 June 1860 at St John's College, Oxford and received there B.A. in 1864, M.A. in 1868, B.D. in 1871, and D.D. in 1874. He was headmaster of Merchant Taylors' School from 1870 to 1900 and became prebendary at St Paul's Cathedral in 1880. During his tenure as headmaster of Merchant Taylors' School, chemistry and physics were introduced into the curriculum, and a new science building was completed in 1891. Biology, per Baker's proposal, was introduced in 1900 into the curriculum as an extra.

Baker's 1895 textbook Latin and Greek verse translations is a collection of 100 translations of English verse into Latin or Greek verse. Many of the textbook's exercises are derived from Baker's "solutions" to the University of Oxford's scholarship examinations in verse composition.

He married in 1870; the marriage produced a son and a daughter.

== Selected publications ==
- Lectures on the historical and dogmatic position of the Church of England. Society for Promoting Christian Knowledge. 1882.
- Baker, William (1895). Latin and Greek verse translations.
- Merchant Taylors' School Register, 1871–1900, compiled and edited with notes and appendices by the Rev. William Baker. Printed for the editor by R. Clay and Sons, Limited. 1907.
