= Kokkisota =

Finnish cooking show

- Genre: Cooking show
- Presented by: Sikke Sumari
- Country of origin: Finland

Production
- Running time: 120 mins

Original release
- Network: MTV3
- Release: February 25, 1999 – present

Kokkisota is a Finnish cooking program. It airs on MTV3. It is based on the British show Ready Steady Cook. The Finnish show premiered in 1999, hosted by Sikke Sumari. The show was revived in 2017, with Sumari returning as the host alongside a new cast of chefs.

== Format ==
Two chefs cook and the best wins. The revival features a 10-minute challenge before the main challenge.

=== 10 minute fast challenge ===
The main chefs have to cook a dish using only the ingredients provided. The winner is decided by the host and receives an advantage in the next challenge.

=== Main challenge ===
The chefs prepare any food they want with a €20 budget. Then they have to cook delicious dishes from the food supply. The winner is decided by the audience.

== Chefs ==
=== Original ===
- Markus Maulavirta
- Helena Puolakka
- Jyrki Sukula
- Harri Syrjänen
- Antti Vaahtera
- Hans Välimäki
- Aki Wahlman

=== Reboot ===
- Kari Aihinen
- Pipsa Hurmerinta (2017 only)
- Teemu Laurell
- Antto Melasniemi (2017 only)
- Serko Rantanen
- Tommi Tuominen
- Harri Syrjänen (2017–present)
- Linnea Vihonen (2018–present)
- Sirly Ylläsjärvi (2021–present)

== Series overview ==
=== Original series ===
Season	Start date	End date	Episodes	Presenter
1	25 February 1999	27 May 1999	12	Sikke Sumari
2				Sikke Sumari
3				Sikke Sumari
4				Sikke Sumari
5				Sikke Sumari
6				Sikke Sumari

=== Revived series ===
Season	Start date	End date	Episodes	Presenter
1	19 January 2017	23 March 2017	10	Sikke Sumari
2				Sikke Sumari
3				Sikke Sumari
4				Sikke Sumari
5	13 May 2021	2021	10	Sikke Sumari and Vappu Pimiä^{1}

^{1}Vappu Pimiä replaced Sikke Sumari for most episodes, as Sumari underwent testing for COVID-19. Sumari later returned to host the rest of the season.

== Episodes (revived version) ==
=== Season 4 (2019–2020) ===
No.	Title (in english)	Winners	Original release date	Viewers
1	"Strange things in the Raw Material Bag"	TBA	TBA	TBD
Chefs: Kari Aihinen / Serko Rantanen; Guests: Perttu Sirviö / Ilkka Uusivuori
2	"Return of the Legends"	TBA	TBA	TBD
Chefs: Serko Rantanen / Harri Syrjänen; Guests: Lola Odusoga / Timo Koivusalo
3	"Wonderful Women"	TBA	TBA	TBD
Chefs: Teemu Laurell / Tommi Tuominen; Guests: Pia Penttala / Pippa Laukka

=== Season 5 (2021) ===
No.	Host	Winners	Original release date	Viewers
1	Sikke Sumari	Kari Aihinen & Kiti Kokkonen	13 May 2021	375,000
Chefs: Linnea Vihonen / Kari Aihinen; Guests: Janne Kataja / Kiti Kokkonen
2	Sikke Sumari	Serko Rantanen & Ville Haapasalo	20 May 2021	355,000
Chefs: Serko Rantanen / Harri Syrjänen; Guests: Ville Haapasalo / Antti Reini
3	Guest host Vappu Pimiä	Jesse Markin & Kasmir	10 June 2021	N/A
Chefs: Serko Rantanen / Tommi Tuominen; Guests: Jesse Markin / Kasmir; Notes: First Chefs vs Guests ever on the show.
4	Sikke Sumari	Harri Syrjänen & Marco Bjurström	17 June 2021	N/A
Chefs: Harri Syrjänen / Kari Aihinen; Guests: Marco Bjurström / Arja Koriseva
5	Guest host Vappu Pimiä	Sirly Ylläsjärvi & Esko Eerikäinen	24 June 2021	N/A
Chefs: Sirly Ylläsjärvi / Serko Rantanen; Guests: Esko Eerikäinen / Martina Aitolehti
6	Sikke Sumari	Teemu Laurell & Janne Virtanen	1 July 2021	N/A
Chefs: Teemu Laurell / Harri Syrjänen; Guests: Janne Virtanen / Helena Ahti-Hallberg
7	Sikke Sumari	Teemu Laurell & Ali Jahangiri	8 July 2021	N/A
Chefs: Linnea Vihonen / Teemu Laurell; Guests: Jenni Poikelus / Ali Jahangiri
8	Sikke Sumari	Tommi Tuominen & Johanna Rusanen	22 July 2021	N/A
Chefs: Tommi Tuominen / Kari Aihinen; Guests: Johanna Rusanen / Janina Fry
9	Guest host Vappu Pimiä	Tommi Tuominen & Maarit Poussa	29 July 2021	N/A
Chefs: Tommi Tuominen / Teemu Laurell; Guests: Maarit Poussa / Pete Lattu
10	Sikke Sumari	Sirly Ylläsjärvi & Susanna Laine	5 August 2021	N/A
Chefs: Linnea Vihonen / Sirly Ylläsjärvi; Guests: Emma Kimiläinen / Susanna Laine
