= Sissy Biggers =

American actress

- Born: Martha Lyons Cargill; July 3, 1957 (age 68); Minneapolis, Minnesota
- Education: Barnard College
- Occupation: Television actress
- Spouse(s): Reeve Kelsey “R.K.” Biggers, Jr.
- Children: 2
- Website: http://www.sissybiggers.com/

Martha "Sissy" Cargill Biggers (born Martha Lyons Cargill on July 3, 1957) is an American television personality and lifestyle expert. She has hosted the Food Network's Ready.. Set... Cook! and Lifetime's Biggers & Summers and Live from Queens talk shows. In 2001 Biggers also served as floor reporter on the short-lived reality television series Iron Chef USA. She has been a regular lifestyles contributor for The Today Show.

== Personal life ==
Biggers graduated from Barnard College. She is married to Reeve Kelsey Biggers Jr., a grandson of John David Biggers, former chief executive officer of the Libbey-Owens-Ford company who conducted the first unemployment census in 1938 at the request of President Franklin D. Roosevelt. She is mother of two children.
