= Donald Parry (cricketer) =

English cricketer

Personal information
- Full name: Donald Morris Parry
- Born: 8 February 1911; Hatch End, Middlesex, England
- Died: 30 March 2002 (aged 91); Stalham, Norfolk, England
- Batting: Right-handed
- Bowling: Right-arm medium

Domestic team information
- Years: Team
- 1931–1932: Cambridge University

Career statistics
Competition	First-class
Matches	17
Runs scored	574
Batting average	22.07
100s/50s	–/2
Top score	87*
Catches/stumpings	6/–
- Source: Cricinfo, 1 January 2022

Donald Morris Parry (8 February 1911 — 30 March 2002) was an English first-class cricketer.

Parry was born at Hatch End in February 1911. He was educated at Merchant Taylors' School, before going up to St Catharine's College, Cambridge. While studying at Cambridge, he played first-class cricket for Cambridge University Cricket Club in 1931 and 1932, making seventeen appearances. He scored a total of 574 runs in his seventeen matches at an average of 22.07, with a highest score of 87 not out, which was made against the Free Foresters in 1931. Parry later served in the Second World War with the Scots Guards, being commissioned as a second lieutenant in December 1942. He relinquished his commission after the war in October 1946. Parry died in March 2002 at Stalham, Norfolk.
