= Jeremy Pang =

British chef (born 1984)

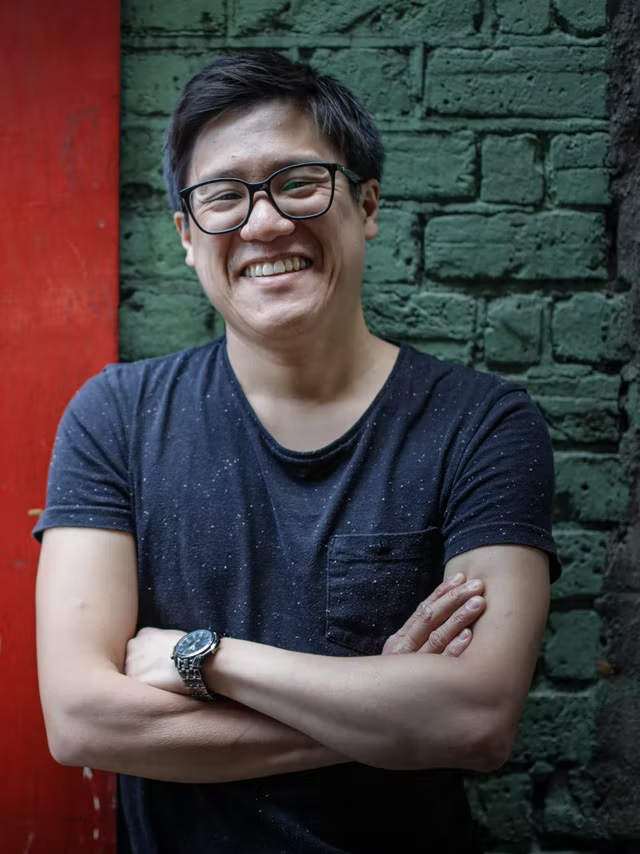
- Jeremy Pang in 2019
- Born: February 29, 1984 (age 42); Darlington, United Kingdom
- Education: University of Bath (M.S., Biochemical Engineering)
- Occupation: Chef
- Website: jeremypang.co.uk

Jeremy Pang (born February 29, 1984) is a British-Chinese chef.

== Early life and education ==
Pang was born in Darlington, United Kingdom. He completed his master's degree in biochemical engineering from the University of Bath, England, in 2006. After completing his university, Pang formally trained in French cooking at Le Cordon Bleu school.

== Career ==
In 2009, Pang established the School of Wok in London. This culinary school was a mobile academy specializing in teaching Eastern cuisine to students at home. In 2014 Pang launched a cookware range with Dexam International, a UK-based Asian cookware range.

He is a regular chef on Channel 4's Sunday Brunch. He has also appeared in Saturday Kitchen alongside the Hairy Bikers, and Food Network's Big Eats.

In 2021, Pang was one of the chefs on BBC's Ready Steady Cook and Nadia Sawalha's Family Feasts. In 2022 he starred in his debut TV show on ITV, Jeremy Pang's Asian Kitchen, accompanied by guest Joe Swash and he is a regular panelist on BBC Radio 4's Kitchen Cabinet.

On 22 March 2025, Jeremy Pang's Hong Kong Kitchen, a six-part cookery series presented by Pang, premiered on ITVX.

== Publications ==
Pang has published several cookbooks. His first book, Chinese Unchopped: An Introduction to Chinese Cooking, was published in 2015. His second book, Hong Kong Diner, was published in 2017. Jeremy Pang's School of Wok is his third cookbook, and it includes a combination of over 80 recipes that can be prepared in minutes. On 27 February 2025, Pang released Jeremy Pang's Hong Kong Kitchen to accompany the television series of the same name. Pang's 224-page Chinese cookbook Jeremy Pang's Chinese Kitchen was published on 15 January 2026.
