= List of Christmas hit singles in the United Kingdom =

The following is an incomplete list of Christmas songs that have appeared in the official singles chart in the United Kingdom. A year indicates the first year of release for that artist's recorded version of the single or track, which may not necessarily be the first year the artist's version charted on The Official UK Charts. To be regarded as a Christmas hit, the song makes direct mention of Christmas, the winter season or the nativity; is a recognised Christmas hymn or carol; or has gone on to feature in Christmas compilation albums.

Title	Artist	Year	Additional information
"21st Century Christmas"	Cliff Richard	2006	Peaked at No. 2 on the 2006 December charts.
"All I Want (For Christmas)"	Liam Payne	2019	Peaked at No. 73 on the Official Singles Chart in December 2019.
"All I Want for Christmas Is a Beatle"	Dora Bryan	1963	Peaked at No. 20 in the 1963 Christmas chart.
"All I Want for Christmas Is You"	Mariah Carey	1994	Written by Walter Afanasieff and Mariah Carey. Originally peaked at No. 2 on the Official Singles Chart in December 1994. Charted again on the Official Singles Chart in December 2007 (peaking at No. 4), in November 2008 (peaking at No. 12), in December 2009 (peaking at No. 18), in December 2010 (peaking at No. 22) and in December 2011 (peaking at No. 11). In December 2013 the song passed the one million sales mark in the UK. The band My Chemical Romance also recorded a version of the song. In 2020, Mariah Carey's version of the song finally peaked at No. 1 on the Official Singles Chart.
"All Alone on Christmas"	Darlene Love	1992	From the film Home Alone 2: Lost in New York. Peaked at No. 31 in the 1992 Christmas Official Singles Chart.
"All Join Hands"	Slade	1984	Peaked at No. 15 on the Official Singles Chart in November 1984. Also peaked at No. 9 on the Irish Singles Chart and No. 19 on the Swedish singles chart in 1984.
"Another Rock and Roll Christmas"	Gary Glitter	1984	Peaked at No. 7 on the Official Singles Chart in December 1984.
"At This Time of Year"	Craig Phillips	2000	Big Brother winner's Christmas charity single for Down's Syndrome Association. Peaked at No. 14 on the Official Singles Chart after being in the Top 40 for three weeks. Phillips also appeared in the videos for Bo Selecta's "Proper Crimbo" (2003), and Ricky Tomlinson's "Christmas My Arse" (2006).
"Ave Maria"	Lesley Garrett & Amanda Thompson	1993	Peaked at No. 16 on the 1993 Christmas Official Singles Chart.
"Baby, It's Cold Outside"	Tom Jones & Cerys Matthews	1999	Peaked at No. 17 on the Official Singles Chart in December 1999. Written in 1944 by Frank Loesser and featured in the 1949 film Neptune's Daughter starring Esther Williams. No specific Christmas content but associated with Christmas.
"Baby's First Christmas"	Connie Francis	1961	Peaked at No. 30 on the Official Singles Chart.
"Best Christmas of Them All"	Shakin' Stevens	1990	Peaked at No. 19 on the Official Singles Chart. From the album Merry Christmas Everyone.
"Bionic Santa"	Chris Hill	1976	Peaked at No. 10 on the Official Singles Chart.
"Blue Christmas"	Elvis Presley	1957	Originally released as a track on Presley's 1957 studio album, Elvis' Christmas Album. After its release as a single, the song peaked at No. 11 on the Official Singles Chart in December 1964. As a digital single, the song re-entered the same chart at position No. 75 in late December 2016 and early January 2017. As of 2025, the single has had 11 separate chart runs on the Official Singles Chart.
"Blue Christmas"	Shakin' Stevens	1982	Peaked at No. 2 for two consecutive weeks on the Official Singles Chart in December 1982 (as a track on The Shakin' Stevens EP).
"Boots"	The Killers	2010	Peaked at No. 53 on the Official Singles Chart.
"Carol of the Bells"	John Williams	1990	Peaked at No. 37 on the Official Singles Chart in late December 2024 and early January 2025.
"Christmas Alphabet"	Dickie Valentine	1955	A Christmas No. 1 single on the Official Singles Chart in 1955. Covered in the US by The McGuire Sisters.
"Christmas and You"	Dave King	1956	Peaked at No. 23 on the Official Singles Chart in December 1956.
"Christmas (Baby Please Come Home)"	Darlene Love	1963	First entered the Official Singles Chart as a digital single in late December 2016 and early January 2017, initially peaking at position No. 74. In late December 2025, this version climbed to an overall peak position of No. 20 (four weeks following its ninth chart re-entry). Originally released as a track on the 1963 Phil Spector-produced studio album, A Christmas Gift for You from Philles Records.
"Christmas (Baby Please Come Home)"	Michael Bublé	2011	Both entered and peaked at position No. 47 on the Official Singles Chart in December 2011.
"Christmas Countdown"	Frank Kelly	1982	Peaked at No. 26 on the Official Singles Chart in December 1983 but first released in Ireland a year earlier.
"Christmas in Blobbyland"	Mr Blobby	1995	Peaked at No. 36 on the Official Singles Chart in December 1995.
"Christmas in Dreadland"	Judge Dread	1975	Peaked at No. 14 on the Official Singles Chart in December 1975.
"Christmas in Hollis"	Run–D.M.C.	1987	Peaked at No. 56 on the Official Singles Chart in December 1987.
"Christmas in Smurfland"	Father Abraham & The Smurfs	1978	Peaked at No. 19 on the Official Singles Chart in December 1978.
"Christmas Is All Around"	Billy Mack	2003	Recorded for the film Love Actually. Peaked at No. 23 on the Official Singles Chart.
"Christmas Island"	Dickie Valentine	1956	Peaked at No. 8 on the Official Singles Chart in December 1956.
"A Christmas Kiss"	Daniel O'Donnell	1999	
"Christmas Lights"	Coldplay	2010	Digital download track, which peaked at No. 13 on the Official Singles Chart for the week of 12 December 2010.
"Christmas Medley"	Weekend	1985	Peaked at No. 47 on the Official Singles Chart in December 1985.
"Christmas My Arse"	Ricky Tomlinson	2006	Video features Craig Phillips, first winner of the UK version of Big Brother.
"Christmas on 45"	Holly and The Ivys	1981	Peaked at No. 40 on the Official Singles Chart in December 1981. A spoof of the Stars on 45/Hooked on Classics trope popular that year.
"Christmas Rappin'"	Kurtis Blow	1979	Peaked at No. 30 on the Official Singles Chart in December 1979.
"Christmas Rapping"	Dizzy Heights	1982	Peaked at No. 49 on the Official Singles Chart in December 1982.
"Christmas Song"	Gilbert O'Sullivan	1974	Peaked at No. 12 on the Official Singles Chart in 1974.
"The Christmas Song"	Nat King Cole	1946	First entered the Official Singles Chart in December 1991, initially peaking at position No. 69. In late December 2025, the song attained an overall peak position of No. 21 (four weeks following its eleventh chart re-entry).
"The Christmas Song"	Alexander O'Neal	1988	Peaked at No. 30 on the Official Singles Chart in December 1988.
"Christmas Spectre"	Jingle Belles	1983	Peaked at No. 37 on the Official Singles Chart in December 1983.
"Christmas Through Your Eyes"	Gloria Estefan	1992	Released as a double A side with "Miami Hit Mix". Peaked at No. 8 on the Official Singles Chart.
"Christmas Time (Don't Let the Bells End)"	The Darkness	2003	Peaked at No. 2 on the Official Singles Chart.
"Christmas Time"	Bryan Adams	1985	Peaked at No. 55 on the Official Singles Chart in December 1985.
"Christmas Tree Farm"	Taylor Swift	2019	Peaked at No. 71 on the Official Singles Chart in December 2019.
"Christmas Will Be Just Another Lonely Day"	Brenda Lee	1964	Peaked at No. 25 on the Official Singles Chart in December 1962.
"Christmas Wrapping"	The Waitresses	1981	Peaked on No. 45 on the Official Singles Chart in December 1982. First appeared on the 1981 various artists holiday compilation album A Christmas Record (Ze Records). Covered in 1998 by the Spice Girls and released as a B-side on their single "Goodbye".
"Coldcut's Christmas Break"	Coldcut	1989	
"Cozy Little Christmas"	Katy Perry	2018	Peaked on No. 22 on the Official Singles Chart in December 2019.
"Cruise Into Christmas Medley"	Jane McDonald	1998	Medley of "White Christmas", "Winter Wonderland" and "Santa Claus Is Coming To Town".
"Cuddle Up Cozy Down Christmas"	Dolly Parton & Michael Bublé	2020	Peaked at No. 81 on the Official Singles Chart in December 2020.
"December, 1963 (Oh, What a Night)"	The Four Seasons	1975	Peaked at No. 1 on the Official Singles Chart in early 1976. Its implied Christmas setting was made explicit in the 2005 Jersey Boys cast recording.
"December Brings Me Back to You"	Andy Abraham featuring Michael Underwood	2006	The GMTV Christmas single for host Michael Underwood, written and sung with X Factor star Andy Abraham. Peaked at No. 18 on the Official Singles Chart.
"December Will Be Magic Again"	Kate Bush	1979	Not released until the Christmas season of 1980. The single peaked at No. 29 on the Official Singles Chart.
"December Song (I Dreamed of Christmas)"	George Michael	2009	Peaked at No. 14 on the Official Singles Chart
"Ding Dong, Ding Dong"	George Harrison	1974	This record – written by Harrison as a celebration of the New Year – peaked at No. 38 on the Official Singles Chart.
"DJ Play a Christmas Song"	Cher	2023	Peaked at No. 18 on the Official Singles Chart in late December 2023 and early January 2024.
"Dominick the Donkey"	Lou Monte	1960	Peaked at No. 3 on the Official Singles Chart in 2011 as part of a campaign by Chris Moyles.
"Do They Know It's Christmas?"	Band Aid	1984	A benefit recording by an all-star group to assist famine relief in Ethiopia; organized by Bob Geldof of the Irish rock band The Boomtown Rats. Written by Geldof and Midge Ure of the British rock band Ultravox. A Christmas No. 1 single on the Official Singles Chart in 1984, and re-recorded on three other separate occasions: Band Aid II in 1989, Band Aid 20 in 2004 and Band Aid 30 in 2014.
"Don't Shoot Me Santa"	The Killers	2007	Peaked at No. 34 on the Official Singles Chart.
"Driving Home for Christmas"	Chris Rea	1986	First released as the B-side of Rea's 1986 single, "Hello Friend." First entered the Official Singles Chart in December 1988 as an EP release containing a 1988 re-recording of the song (originally peaking a position No. 53). The 1988 recording re-entered the Official Singles Chart as a digital single in December 2007 (attaining a new peak position of No. 33). In late December 2021 and early January 2022, the 1988 recording attained an overall peak chart position of No. 10 (following its fifteenth chart re-entry). As of December 2025, the song has had a total of 20 individual chart runs on the Official Singles Chart.
"Echoes of Merry Christmas Everyone"	Shakin' Stevens	2015	A 30th anniversary song, using a different style compared to the original "Merry Christmas Everyone" that reached the Christmas No. 1 spot in 1985. This 2015 reworking uses folk and bluegrass influences, with prominent use of banjo.
"Every Year, Every Christmas"	Luther Vandross	1995	Peaked at No. 43 on the Official Singles Chart.
"Fairytale of New York"	The Pogues featuring Kirsty MacColl	1987	Written by Jem Finer and Shane MacGowan. Peaked at No. 2 the Official Singles Chart in December 1987, and beaten to No. 1 by the Pet Shop Boys' "Always on My Mind". Also peaked at No. 1 on the Irish singles chart (where it continues to be the most popular Christmas song).
"Father Christmas Do Not Touch Me"	The Goodies	1974	Peaked at No. 7 on the Official Singles Chart. Part of a double A-side.
"Fifty Grand for Christmas"	Paul Holt	2004	
"Feliz Navidad"	José Feliciano	1970	First entered the Official Singles Chart at No. 78 in early January 2017, peaking at No. 17 in late December 2024 and early January 2025 (following its eighth chart re-entry).
"Footprints in the Snow"	Johnny Duncan & The Bluegrass Boys	1957	Peaked at No. 27 on the Official Singles Chart.
"Gaudete"	Steeleye Span	1973	First charted on the Official Singles Chart in December 1973, peaking at No. 14.
"The Gift"	Sidemen	2019	Peaked at No. 77 on the Official Singles Chart in December 2019.
"The Gift of Christmas"	Childliners	1995	Peaked at No. 9 on the Official Singles Chart.
"Give U One 4 Christmas"	Hot Pantz	2005	Peaked at No. 64 on the Official Singles Chart.
"Grandma's Party"	Paul Nicholas	1976	Peaked at No. 9 on the Official Singles Chart in early January 1977.
"Hallelujah"	Alexandra Burke	2008	This version and a Jeff Buckley version occupied the top two spots on the 2008 Christmas Day chart.
"Happy Xmas (War Is Over)"	John and Yoko and The Plastic Ono Band with the Harlem Community Choir	1971	Written by John Lennon and Yoko Ono. Originally charted on the Official Singles Chart in December 1972, peaking at No. 4. Reached a new peak of No. 2 on the Official Singles Chart in December 1980 after the death of Lennon. Later covered by Melissa Etheridge in 1994, The Polyphonic Spree, Celine Dion in 1997, The Idols, The Alarm, Neil Diamond, the Street Drum Corps ft. Bert McCracken of The Used, Sarah McLachlan in 2006, and most recently by John Legend in 2019.
"Have a Cheeky Christmas"	Cheeky Girls	2003	Peaked at No. 10 on the Official Singles Chart.
"Have Yourself a Merry Little Christmas"	Frank Sinatra	1957	Entered the Official Singles Chart at position No. 100 as a digital single in late December 2018 and early January 2019. Peaked at position No. 45 on the same chart in late December 2024 and early January 2025 (at the end of its fifth chart run).
"Hey Mister Christmas"	Showaddywaddy	1974	Peaked at No. 13 in the Christmas 1974 Official Singles Chart.
"Hokey Cokey"	The Snowmen	1981	Peaked at No. 18 on the 1981 Christmas Official Singles Chart. Black Lace's version peaked at No. 31 in 1985.
"A Holly Jolly Christmas"	Burl Ives	1964	First entered the Official Singles Chart in December 2022 as a digital single, initially peaking at position No. 42 in late December 2022 and early January 2023. Following its first chart re-entry in December 2023, the song attained an overall peak position of No. 40 on the Official Singles Chart.
"A Holly Jolly Christmas"	Michael Bublé	2011	First entered the Official Singles Charts at position No. 96 in late December 2014 and early January 2015. Following its eighth chart re-entry in November 2023, the song attained an overall peak chart position of No. 21 in December 2023.
"The Holy City"	Moira Anderson	1969	Peaked at No. 43 on the Official Singles Chart.
"I Believe in Christmas"	The Tweenies	2001	Peaked at No. 9 on the Official Singles Chart.
"I Believe in Father Christmas"	Greg Lake	1975	Written by Greg Lake and Peter Sinfield. Peaked at No. 2 on the Official Singles Chart (behind Queen's "Bohemian Rhapsody") in December 1975. Charted again in December 1982 (peaking at No. 72) and again in December 1983 (peaking at No. 65).
"I Got You Babe"	Bo' Selecta!	2004	Second Christmas single released by Bo' Selecta!, featuring Davina McCall and Patsy Kensit.
"I Have Forgiven Jesus"	Morrissey	2004	Peaked at No. 10 on the 2004 UK December chart.
"I Love Christmas"	Fast Food Rockers	2003	Peaked at No. 25 on the Official Singles Chart.
"I Saw Mommy Kissing Santa Claus"	Jimmy Boyd	1952	Peaked at No. 6 on the Official Singles Chart in December 1953. The Jimmy Boyd version was one of three versions to chart in 1953; the others were recorded by the Beverley Sisters and Billy Cotton.
"I Want an Alien for Christmas"	Fountains of Wayne	1997	Peaked at No. 36 on the Official Singles Chart.
"I Was Born on Christmas Day"	Saint Etienne co-starring Tim Burgess	1993	Peaked at No. 37 on the Official Singles Chart in December 1993.
"I Wish It Could Be a Wombling Merry Christmas Everyday"	The Wombles with Roy Wood	2000	A newly recorded combination of "I Wish It Could Be Christmas Everyday" and "Wombling Merry Christmas".
"I Wish It Could Be Christmas Everyday"	Wizzard	1973	Featuring backing vocals by the Suedettes, plus the Stockland Green Bilateral School First Year Choir, with additional noises by Miss. Snob and Class 3C. Peaked at No. 4 on the Official Singles Chart. Re-recorded by the writer, Wizzard frontman Roy Wood, in 1981 after the original mastertapes were lost, then again in 1984 as a 12" single, and then again with his Roy Wood Big Band as a live single in 1995. Later covered by the A*Teens, Kylie Minogue, Girls Aloud, the Big Reunion and Wilson Phillips (whose version peaked at No. 14 on the Billboard Hot Adult Contemporary Tracks chart in December 2010).
"If Every Day Was Like Christmas"	Elvis Presley	1966	Peaked at No. 13 in the 1966 Christmas Chart.
"I'll Be Home"	Meghan Trainor	2020	Peaked at No. 83 on the Official Singles Chart in December 2020.
"I'll Be Home for Christmas"	Shakin' Stevens	1991	Peaked at No. 34 on the Official Singles Chart. From the album Merry Christmas Everyone.
"I'm Walking Backwards for Christmas"	The Goons	1956	Peaked at No. 4 in 1956. In a typically Goon-esque move, the record was released in the middle of summer.
"In Dulci Jubilo"	Mike Oldfield	1975	Peaked at No. 4 on the Official Singles Chart in early 1976. Also known as "Good Christmas Men, Rejoice" and "In Sweetest Jubilee".
"In the Bleak Midwinter"	Jamie Cullum	2020	Cover of the traditional Christmas carol. Peaked at No. 90 on the Official Singles Chart in December 2020.
"Is This Christmas?"	The Wombats	2008	
"It Doesn't Often Snow at Christmas"	Pet Shop Boys	1997	Peaked at No. 40 on the Official Singles Chart in December 2009.
"It Won't Seem Like Christmas Without You"	Elvis Presley	1968	The first posthumous UK top 40 hit to feature the word Christmas when peaking at No. 13 in the 1979 Official Singles Chart.
"It's Beginning to Look a Lot Like Christmas"	Perry Como	1951	First entered the Official Singles Chart in December 2007, peaking at No. 40 in late December 2024 and early January 2025 (following its ninth chart re-entry).
"It's Beginning to Look a Lot Like Christmas"	Michael Bublé	2011	First entered the Official Singles Chart in December 2011, peaking at No. 6 in late December 2022 and early January 2023 (following its eleventh chart re-entry). From Buble's 2011 studio album, Christmas.
"It's Christmas Time"	Status Quo	2008	Peaked at No. 40 on the Official Singles Chart.
"It's Gonna Be a Cold Cold Christmas"	Dana	1975	Peaked at No. 4 on the Official Singles Chart in 1975.
"It's the Most Wonderful Time of the Year"	Andy Williams	1963	Peaked at No. 9 on the Official Singles Chart in late December 2021 and early January 2022 (and then again in late December 2023 and early January 2024).
"It Must Be Santa"	Joan Regan	1961	Peaked at No. 42 on the Official Singles Chart.
"Jingle Bell Rock"	Bobby Helms	1957	First entered the Official Singles Chart at position No. 71 in late December 2016 and early January 2017 as a digital single, eventually peaking at No. 5 in late December 2024 and early January 2025 (following its eighth chart re-entry).
"Jingle Bell Rock"	Max Bygraves	1959	Peaked at No. 7 on the Official Singles Chart in December 1959. However, the many American versions that did not chart in the UK are now more widely known from frequent use on television and in films.
"Jingle Bells"	Basshunter	2006	Peaked at No. 34 on the 2008 Christmas chart.
"Keeping the Dream Alive"	Freiheit	1988	A UK hit single at Christmas 1988, peaking at number 14; originally recorded in the German language a year earlier. Although it has no Christmas-themed lyrics, the song's distinctly Christmassy feel, coupled with the time of year when it was originally released, gradually led it to be regarded as a Christmas hit and has resulted in its being featured on several UK Christmas compilation albums such as Christmas Top 100.
"Last Christmas"	Wham!	1984	Written by George Michael. Peaked at No. 2 on the Official Singles Chart in December 1984. Re-released in 1985. Rumoured to have been written for Easter, but later changed to Christmas to boost sales. It was covered by Alien Voices featuring The Three Degrees in 1988 (which reached No. 54), the cast of the television series "The Only Way is Essex" (which peaked at No. 33 in 2011), and Crazy Frog (which peaked at No. 16 in 2006). A version by Whigfield reached No. 21 in 1995.
"Let It Snow, Let It Snow, Let It Snow"	Dean Martin	1959	First entered the Official Singles Chart at No. 100 in December 2007, eventually peaking at No. 12 in late December 2025 (following its 13th chart re-entry). Originally released as a track on Martin's 1959 studio album, A Winter Romance.
"Let's Party"	Jive Bunny & the Mastermixers	1989	A medley of three Christmas hits: "Merry Xmas Everybody" by Slade, "I Wish It Could Be Christmas Everyday" by Wizzard and finally "Another Rock and Roll Christmas" by Gary Glitter. The song was remixed again in 2004, replacing Gary Glitter with Mariah Carey singing "All I Want for Christmas Is You". This mix is available to only DJs.
"Lick a Smurp for Christmas"	Father Abraphart & The Smurps	1978	A Jonathan King spoof of the Smurfs. Peaked at No. 58 on the Official Singles Chart.
"Light Up"	Flakefleet Primary School	2018	Peaked at No. 64 on the Official Singles Chart in December 2018.
"Like It's Christmas"	Jonas Brothers	2019	Peaked at No. 53 on the Official Singles Chart in December 2019.
"Little Donkey"	Beverley Sisters	1959	Peaked at No. 14, Gracie Fields' version peaked at No. 21 the same year, but the song topped the sheet music charts. Dutch duo Nina & Frederik had more success with the song in 1960, peaking at No. 3.
"Little Town"	Cliff Richard	1982	A contemporary reworking of the Victorian carol O Little Town of Bethlehem, peaked at No. 11 on the 1982 Christmas Official Singles Chart.
"Little Drummer Boy"	Pipes & Drums & Military Band of The Royal Scots Dragoon Guards	1972	Peaked at No. 13 in the 1972 Official Singles Chart. A second version by Terry Wogan & Aled Jones peaked at No. 3 on the 2008 Christmas chart.
"Lonely Pup (In a Christmas Shop)"	Adam Faith with the Children	1960	Peaked at No. 4 on the Official Singles Chart in December 1960.
"Lonely This Christmas"	Mud	1974	A Christmas No. 1 single on the Official Singles Chart in 1974.
"Make a Daft Noise for Christmas"	The Goodies	1975	Peaked at No. 20 on the Official Singles Chart.
"Man with the Bag"	Jessie J	2015	Cover of the Kay Starr original, which did not chart. Peaked at No. 70 on the Official Singles Chart in December 2019.
"Mary's Boy Child"	Harry Belafonte	1956	Written by Jester Hairston. First entered the Official Singles Chart in November 1957, spending seven consecutive weeks at No. 1 from 22 November 1957 to 9 January 1958. The reissue one year later also reached the Top 10, reaching No. 10 in December 1958. Also a Top 40 hit for Nina & Frederik in 1959.
"Mary's Boy Child"	Nina & Frederik	1959	Entered the Official Singles Chart in December 1959 at position No. 26 (also its peak position).
"Mary's Boy Child – Oh My Lord"	Boney M.	1978	A disco medley. The previous entry combined with a new song written by Frank Farian and Fred Jay. The UK Christmas No. 1 of 1978.
"The Meaning of Christmas"	Boris Gardiner	1986	Peaked at No. 69 on the Official Singles Chart.
"Merry Christmas"	Ed Sheeran & Elton John	2021	Debuted at No. 1 on the Official Singles Chart, spending three nonconsecutive weeks on top.
"Merry Christmas Darling"	The Carpenters	1970	Peaked at No. 45 in the 1972 Christmas Official Singles Chart. Was re-released as a double A side in 1990 and this time peaked at No. 25.
"Merry Christmas Everyone"	Shakin' Stevens	1985	Produced by Dave Edmunds. A Christmas No. 1 single on the Official Singles Chart in 1985.
"Merry Gentle Pops"	The Barron Knights	1965	Novelty hit, which peaked at No. 9 in the 1965 Christmas chart.
"A Merry Jingle"	The Greedies	1979	Charity single recorded by members of Thin Lizzy and Sex Pistols. It peaked at No. 28 that year on the Official Singles Chart.
"Merry Xmas Everybody"	Slade	1973	Written by Noddy Holder and Jim Lea. A Christmas No. 1 single on the Official Singles Chart in 1973. Covered by Dexys Midnight Runners in 1982, Steps, Noel Gallagher, and then Tony Christie in 2005. Has also been reissued by Slade on several occasions, most recently in 2006.
"The Millennium Prayer"	Cliff Richard	1999	Topped the Official Singles Chart in December 1999.
"Mistletoe"	Justin Bieber	2011	Both debuted and peaked at No. 21 on the Official Singles Chart in October 2011. Since 2011, the song has had 12 separate chart runs on the Official Singles Chart (including every year since 2016).
"Mistletoe and Wine"	Cliff Richard	1988	A Christmas No. 1 single on the Official Singles Chart in 1988.
"Mr. Hankey, the Christmas Poo"	Mr. Hankey	1999	Peaked at No. 4 on the Official Singles Chart in 1999.
"Must Be Santa"	Tommy Steele	1960	Peaked at No. 40 on the Official Singles Chart.
"Naughty Christmas (Goblin in the Office)"	Fat Les	1998	
"Naughty List"	Liam Payne & Dixie D'Amelio	2020	Peaked at No. 55 on the Official Singles Chart in December 2020.
"Never Mind the Presents"	The Barron Knights	1980	Novelty hit parody of various hits of the year. Peaked at No. 17 on the 1980 Official Singles Chart.
"New Year"	Sugababes	2000	Peaked at No. 12 on the Official Singles Chart.
"Oh Santa!"	Mariah Carey, Ariana Grande & Jennifer Hudson	2020	Peaked at No. 67 on the Official Singles Chart in December 2020.
"Once Upon a Christmas Song"	Geraldine	2008	Entered and peaked at No. 5 on the 2008 Christmas chart.
"Once Upon a Long Ago"	Paul McCartney	1987	As with a previous Christmas McCartney hit, "Pipes of Peace", the song itself makes no mention of Christmas but was released for the Christmas market with a strongly Christmas themed video, peaking at No. 10 in the 1987 Christmas chart.
"One I've Been Missing"	Little Mix	2019	Peaked at No. 59 on the Official Singles Chart in November 2019.
"One More Sleep"	Leona Lewis	2013	Peaked at No. 3 on the Official Singles Chart in December 2013.
"One Nine for Santa"	Fogwell Flax & The Ankle Biters from Frehold Junior School	1981	Peaked at No. 68 on the Official Singles Chart in 1981.
"Peace on Earth/Little Drummer Boy"	David Bowie and Bing Crosby	1982	Peaked at No. 3 on the Official Singles Chart in December 1982. Recorded on 11 September 1977 for Crosby's UK holiday television special, Bing Crosby's Merrie Olde Christmas. The song wasn't released as a commercial single until 1982, and a video clip of their duet from the TV special became an MTV staple for the remainder of the 1980s.
"Pipes of Peace"	Paul McCartney	1983	Released for the 1983 Christmas market, but only topped the Official Singles Chart in January 1984. The song does not actually make any reference to Christmas but its accompanying video depicts the 1914 Christmas Day truce between British and German soldiers on the Western front.
"Please Come Home For Christmas"	Bon Jovi	1994	Peaked at No. 7 on the Official Singles Chart in December 1994. An earlier version of the song, by the Eagles, peaked at No. 30 on the Official Singles Chart in 1978.
"The Perfect Year"	Dina Carroll	1993	From the Andrew Lloyd Webber musical Sunset Boulevard. Also recorded by Glenn Close and Alan Campbell on the 2001 album Andrew Lloyd Webber: Gold.
"The Power of Love"	Frankie Goes to Hollywood	1984	Peaked at No. 1 on the Official Singles Chart in December 1984. Contains no reference to Christmas but was promoted with a nativity-themed video and charted again as a reissue at Christmas in 1993 and 2012. A cover version by Gabrielle Aplin, recorded for John Lewis' Christmas TV advertising campaign, reached No. 1 in December 2012.
"Pretty Paper"	Roy Orbison	1964	Peaked at No. 6 on the Official Singles Chart in December 1964.
"Proper Crimbo"	Bo' Selecta!	2003	The promotional music video features guest appearances from various celebrities including Edith Bowman, Chris Moyles, Bob Geldof, Mel B, Christine Hamilton, Craig Phillips and Jimmy Carr.
"Remembering Christmas"	Exeter Bramdean Boys' Choir	1993	Peaked at No. 46 on the Official Singles Chart.
"Renta Santa"	Chris Hill	1975	Peaked at No. 10 on the Official Singles Chart.
"River"	Ellie Goulding	2019	Cover of the Joni Mitchell original, which failed to chart. Peaked at No. 1 on the Official Singles Chart in December 2019.
"Rockin' Around the Christmas Tree"	Brenda Lee	1958	Originally peaked at No. 6 on the Official Singles Chart in late December 1962, but reached an overall peak chart position of No. 3 in late December 2025 (five weeks following its eighteenth chart re-entry).
"Rockin' Around the Christmas Tree"	Comic Relief Presents Mel & Kim	1987	Charity single that peaked at No. 3 for two consecutive weeks on the Official Singles Chart in December 1987 and early January 1988.
"Rockin' Around the Christmas Tree"	Justin Bieber	2020	Peaked at No. 4 on the Official Singles Chart in early January 2021.
"Rockin' Good Christmas"	Roy 'Chubby' Brown	1996	Peaked at No. 51 on the Official Singles Chart.
"Run Rudolph Run"	Chuck Berry	1958	First released as a commercial single in the United Kingdom in December 1963, entering the Official Singles Chart that same month ane peaking at No. 36 in early January 1964. It has re-entered the chart every year since December 2018, getting as high as No. 47 in late December 2024 and early January 2025 (two weeks following its seventh chart re-entry).
"Same Old Lang Syne"	Dan Fogelberg	1980	Despite reaching the Top 10 of the U.S. Billboard Hot 100 singles chart in February 1981, the song didn't chart on the Official Singles Chart in the UK until 2008, peaking at No. 92.
"Santa Baby"	Kylie Minogue	2007	Originally recorded in 2000 as part of the Top of the Pops Christmas Special was released a B-side to her single "Please Stay", which peaked at No.10. Reached No. 76 on the 2007 chart due to digital downloads. Re-Entered the Christmas charts in 2011, 2012 and 2015. Re-peaked at No.72 on the Christmas charts in 2016. It became Minogue's 50th UK Top 40 hit when it reached No.38 on the during the Christmas week chart in 2017.
"Santa, Bring My Baby Back to Me"	Elvis Presley	1957	Peaked at No. 7 on the Official Singles Chart.
"Santa, Can't You Hear Me"	Kelly Clarkson & Ariana Grande	2021	Peaked at No. 23 for two consecutive weeks on the Official Singles Chart in December 2023 (at the beginning of its third chart run).
"Santa Claus Is Back in Town"	Elvis Presley	1957	Peaked at No. 41 on the Official Singles Chart in 1980.
"Santa Claus is Comin' to Town"	Bruce Springsteen	1985	Peaked at No. 9 on the Official Singles Chart in December 1985. Charted again on the Official Singles Chart for one week in December 2007 (peaking at No. 60). Versions of the song recorded by other artists that charted on the Official Singles Chart include The Jackson 5 (peaked at No. 43 in December 1972), The Carpenters (peaked at No. 37 in December 1975), and Björn Again (peaked at No. 55 in December 1992).
"Santa Claus Is on the Dole"	Spitting Image	1986	With "1st Atheist Tabernacle Choir" on the B-side.
"Santa Tell Me"	Ariana Grande	2014	Initially peaked at No. 68 on the Official Singles Chart (in late December 2014 and early January 2015). In 2017, it became the fifth most streamed Christmas song in the world on Spotify in the same year. In late December 2023, it reached an overall peak position of No. 8 (returning to that same peak position exactly one year later).
"Santa's Coming for Us"	Sia	2017	Peaked at No. 39 on the Christmas chart in 2017, before re-peaking at No. 24 in December 2018.
"Santa's List"	Cliff Richard	2003	Peaked at No. 5.
"Santo Natale"	David Whitfield	1954	Literally translates to Merry Christmas and was a double A with "O Come All Ye Faithful". Was kept off the 1954 Christmas number one spot by Winifred Atwell's Let's Have Another Party.
"Saviour's Day"	Cliff Richard	1990	A Christmas No. 1 single on the Official Singles Chart in 1990.
"Shake the Snow Globe"	Gwen Stefani	2025	Peaked at No. 16 on the Official Singles Chart in late December 2025.
"Silent Night"	Bing Crosby	1952	Peaked at No. 8 in the first ever UK Christmas chart of 1952 under the title "Silent Night – Holy Night". Bros peaked at No. 2 on the Official Singles Chart in December 1988 with their version on a double A-sided single ("Cat Among the Pigeons" was on the flip).
"Silver Bells"	Sir Terry Wogan & Aled Jones	2009	Peaked at No. 29 on the Christmas Day chart in 2009.
"Singalong-A-Santa"	Santa Claus & The Christmas Trees	1982	Peaked at No. 19 on the Official Singles Chart.
"Singalong-A-Santa Again"	Santa Claus & The Christmas Trees	1983	Peaked at No. 39 on the Official Singles Chart.
"Sleigh Ride"	The Ronettes	1963	Peaked at No. 15 on the Official Singles Chart in late December 2024 and early January 2025.
"Snowbound for Christmas"	Dickie Valentine	1957	Peaked at No. 28 in the 1957 Christmas Chart.
"Snow Coach"	Russ Conway	1959	Peaked at No. 7 on the Official Singles Chart.
"Snowbird"	Anne Murray	1969	Canadian Christmas chart topper, which peaked at No. 23 on the 1970 Official Singles Chart.
"Snowman"	Sia	2017	First entered the Official Singles Chart at position No. 78 in December 2020, peaking at position No. 18 in December 2024 (following its fourth chart re-entry).
"So Near to Christmas"	Alvin Stardust	1984	Peaked at No. 29 on the Official Singles Chart.
"A Spaceman Came Travelling"	Chris de Burgh	1975	Originally released on Chris de Burgh's second studio album, Spanish Train and Other Stories (1975). Became a Top 40 pop hit single on the Official Singles Chart in December 1986 following the success of de Burgh's UK No. 1 pop hit, "The Lady in Red".
"Stay Another Day"	East 17	1994	A Christmas No. 1 single on the Official Singles Chart in 1994, famous for beating Mariah Carey's "All I Want for Christmas Is You" to that 1994 Christmas No. 1 spot. It has no Christmas-themed lyrics, although it has a Christmas themed video as well as an alternative video that has no Christmas theme.
"Step into Christmas"	Elton John	1973	The B-side of this 1973 single contained another holiday tune by Elton titled "Ho Ho Ho (Who'd Be a Turkey at Christmas)". Though not a big hit upon its initial release in 1973 when it peaked at No. 24, it has returned to the charts regularly, and finally made it into the top ten at the ninth time of asking in Christmas 2018. In December 2025, it peaked at No. 7 (its highest position to date).
"Stop the Cavalry"	Jona Lewie	1980	Peaked at No. 3 on the Official Singles Chart in December 1980.
"Thank God It's Christmas"	Queen	1984	Peaked at No. 21 on the Official Singles Chart in December 1984.
"This Christmas"	Jess Glynne	2020	Cover of the Donny Hathaway original, which did not chart. Peaked at No. 13 on the Official Singles Chart in December 2020.
"This One's for the Children"	New Kids on the Block	1990	Peaked at No. 9 on the Official Singles Chart in December 1990.
"Time Passages"	Al Stewart	1978	Failed to chart as a single in the UK (despite being a major hit in other anglophone countries), but the titular Time Passages album reached No. 39 on the Official Albums Chart in 1979.
"2000 Miles"	Pretenders	1983	Peaked at No. 15 on the Official Singles Chart in December 1983.
"Under the Tree"	The Water Babies	2005	
"Underneath the Tree"	Kelly Clarkson	2013	Peaked at No. 5 on the Official Singles Chart in December 2025.
"The Very First Christmas of All"	Ruby Murray	1955	Peaked at No. 9.
"The Lighthouse Keeper"	Sam Smith	2020	Peaked at No. 81 on the Official Singles Chart in December 2020.
"Virgin Mary"	Lonnie Donegan	1960	Peaked at No. 27.
"Walking in the Air"	Peter Auty and the Sinfonia of London	1982	From the 1982 film adaptation of The Snowman. Reached its highest chart position of No. 37 in 1987. Later recorded by Aled Jones in 1985 (peaking at No. 5), and Nightwish in 1999.
"Warm This Winter"	Gabriella Cilmi	2008	Cover of the 1962 Connie Francis song originally titled "I'm Gonna Be Warm This Winter". Top 30 hit on the 2008 Christmas chart.
"What Are We Gonna Get 'Er Indoors" (Interpolating "In The Bleak Mid-Winter")	George Cole and Dennis Waterman	1983	A one-off single, a spin-off from the popular British TV series Minder, it was based musically on a piece by Gustav Holst, who for copyright reasons was given a joint co-composing credit on the label alongside the two performers. Peaked at No. 21 on the Official Singles Chart.
"What If"	Kate Winslet	2001	Peaked at No. 6 on the Official Singles Chart in December 2001. Featured and based on the film Christmas Carol: The Movie released the same year.
"We Should Be Together"	Cliff Richard	1991	Peaked at No. 10 on the Official Singles Chart in December 1991.
"When a Child Is Born"	Johnny Mathis	1976	Based on the instrumental "Soleado" by Italian composer Ciro Dammicco. English lyrics by Fred Jay. A Christmas No. 1 single on the Official Singles Chart in 1976.
"White Christmas"	Mantovani	1952	Peaked at No. 6 in the first ever UK Christmas chart in 1952. A Pat Boone version peaked at No. 29 on the Official Singles Chart in December 1957. Max Bygraves' version reached No. 71 in 1989. Bing Crosby's version did not chart until 1977, but it had originally been released before the UK singles chart began, and was eventually the most successful version, peaking at No. 5.
"A Winter's Tale"	David Essex	1982	Peaked at No. 2 on the Official Singles Chart in January 1983.
"A Winter's Tale"	Queen	1995	Debuted and peaked at No. 6 on the Official Singles Chart during Christmas week in December 1995.
"Winter Wonderland"	Johnny Mathis	1958	Peaked at position No. 17 on the Official Singles Chart in late December 1958 and early January 1959. Recorded by over 200 different artists.
"Winter Wonderland"	Laufey	2023	Peaked at position No. 18 on the Official Singles Chart in December 2025 upon its second chart re-entry.
"Winter World of Love"	Engelbert Humperdinck	1969	Peaked at No. 7 in the 1969 Christmas Chart.
"Wombling Merry Christmas"	The Wombles	1974	Peaked at No. 2 on the Official Singles Chart in December 1974.
"Wonderful Christmastime"	Paul McCartney	1979	Peaked at No. 6 on the Official Singles Chart in December 1979. Backed with the B-side "Rudolph the Red-Nosed Reggae" (an instrumental cover of "Rudolph the Red-Nosed Reindeer").
"Your Christmas Wish"	The Smurfs	1996	Peaked at No. 8 on the 1996 Christmas Official Singles Chart.
"X-M@$"	Corey Taylor	2010	Peaked at No. 37 on the Official Singles Chart in December 2010.
"XMAS"	Kylie Minogue	2025	Peaked at No. 1 on the Official Singles Chart in December 2025.

== See also ==
- Best-selling Christmas/holiday singles in the United States
- Christmas music
- List of Christmas carols
- List of Christmas hit singles in the United States
- List of Christmas number one singles (UK)
- UK Singles Chart
