= List of Bo' Selecta! characters =

This is a list of characters from the television series Bo' Selecta!

== Main characters ==
=== Craig David ===
Craig David is one of the main Bo' Selecta characters. His catchphrases are "Proper Reet Bo" and "Proper Bo, I tell thee!". He is portrayed as having a very large chin, with a beard made with a pen. Craig has a very strong Yorkshire accent. He is known for always singing his name. He carries around a plastic Peregrine Falcon on his wrist named "Kes", possibly as a reference to the film of the same name. Kes was apparently bought off a man in Huddersfield who had a dog with one leg. He calls Kes a "bastard", often when calling her to return. Craig also wears a beanie hat, and his iconic headphones from his Born to Do It album cover. In the first series, a segment entitled "Craig David's Life Story" is featured, showing events such as David visiting the doctor to be fitted with a urostomy bag (which he often fails to wear at night and wets the bed), and attempting to break the American market but catches a flight to Mallorca by accident. For the second series, each episode segment follows him on his nationwide UK tour alongside his band (who hate him), in which he meets Michael Jackson, goes dating, goes for a walk, meets the real Craig David (portrayed in the show as a tribute act), and performs in front of a live audience. In the third series, he attempts to break America again with his new single "Soda Pop", which fails to chart in the US top 40. Along the way, he makes a music video and gets himself a makeover from Mel B. He appeared in Bo! in the USA, in a weekly segment in which he tries to seduce Holly Valance and earn himself a bronze swimming award. In Cha'mone Mo'Fo' Selecta he was reduced to working in a call center. Leigh Francis stated in an interview with Metro that the character was based on Billy Casper from Kes, rather than Craig David.

=== Mel B ===
Mel B is portrayed as a drunk, scary, and dirty old woman. She has white skin, red hair, and a massive nose. She speaks with a heavy northern accent, which is apparent when she says the word "fuck" like "fook", and wears a leopard-print top, revealing a disturbingly hairy chest. Her best known catchphrase is "yer bastard ya!", whilst often making remarks regarding lesbian sex and her minge, which she describes as smelling like crab paste. In the first series, she features in a segment in which she promotes her new book, which discusses the split of the Spice Girls and her love for her stuffed tiger Felix. In the second series, she becomes a non-weekly character, only appearing three times during the series, appearing in segments when she goes on holiday, shows us her "Crib" and talks about Girls Aloud. In the third series, she becomes a regular character again, and appears in a segment entitled "The Odd Couple". The segment shows her living with singer and actress Patsy Kensit, whom she is always trying to seduce and with whom she eventually has a drunken one night stand in the final episode. On the music video for Avid Merrion's cover for "I Got You Babe" (which also starred Patsy Kensit), Mel's father was revealed to be Jim Bowen. She also appears in Bo! in the USA, however, as a non-regular character. The real Mel B appeared a few times during the series.

=== Michael Jackson ===
Michael Jackson is portrayed as usually beginning his segment by shouting "Cha'mone mother fucker!", which is a reference to the word "shamone" that Jackson often used in his music, pronouncing most words with an "ay" at the end, and always wearing the trademark rhinestone glove. In series one, his segment was titled "The Jacksons", which featured Michael showing the viewer around his family home, and having an ongoing feud with The Osbournes. In series two, a segment entitled "Michael Jackass" was premièred, which showed Jackson doing dangerous tasks such as wakeboarding drunk, diving in an aquarium tank covered in fish, ice skating naked, diving into a pool with his arms and legs tied up, and skydiving. In the third series, Jackson's segment was entitled "Doin' Porridge", a parody of the TV series Porridge. The segment followed his nine weeks of being in jail (the real Michael Jackson was due to face trial at the time) with his comedy hero Ronnay Barkay. He also appeared in Bo! in the USA, appearing in a renewed version of "Michael Jackass". The character featured in his own special, Chamone Mo Fo Selecta, following his real-life death in 2009.

=== David Blaine ===
David Blaine is portrayed as a sex-obsessed street magician doubling as a pickup artist. Throughout the first two series, Blaine was featured in a self-titled segment, which saw himself perform tricks against unsuspecting female members of the public. However, during the trick, he is seen groping them for "close contact". In series two, each trick would involve one piece of the woman's underwear being removed from their body and worn by Blaine. After the trick, he tells the person that if they want their underwear back, they would have to "get a room" with him. In one of his magic tricks (referencing his "Frozen in Time" stunt), he masturbates in front of the audience while being encased in ice. He didn't appear in series three or in Bo! in the USA.

=== The Osbournes ===
Many of the Osbourne family are parodied on Bo' Selecta. They have also appeared on the show as themselves, usually while being stalked by Avid. Ozzy is shown to have very long arms, which are constantly moving in front of his body. He is shown to be always mumbling, which makes it impossible to understand what he is saying, apart from the swear bleeps during his sentence. He sometimes shouts "Sharon!" while he is speaking. Sharon is shown to speak in a high-pitched calm voice, quite opposite to what she is like in real life. She is either always sweeping the floor with a brush, or searching for food, a reference to her real life bulimia, though is obsessed with her dogs and often is portrayed as eating their bowel movements. Kelly is the most core character of The Osbournes. She is portrayed to be always swearing, using the word "douchebag" constantly, and extremely hostile and violent. Throughout series one, she regularly appeared in "The Week In Bits" segment, often meeting other celebrities or talking about her private life. In series two, she has her own segment, entitled "The Kelly Osbourne Show", in which she goes shopping, gets a haircut, slags off other celebrities, or does an advice call-in. Jack was not featured in the first series, though briefly appeared in series two during The Kelly Osbourne Show and once during Craig David's tour, though he was portrayed as a slow moronic child like adult. In series three, his face and hair is drastically increased and he gains a Yorkshire accent in his own show "Jack Off" in which he interviews several people. His catchphrase was "Brown Bread!".

=== Avid Merrion ===
First appearing on Whatever I Want, Avid Merrion, played by Leigh Francis, is the main protagonist of the series. He is obsessed with celebrities and stalks them, after he grew up to become the number one celebrity super fan in the world. Originating from the small town of Arachnipuss near Transylvania, Avid was born to a father who was a Dracula-impersonating stripper. Avid lives in a flat in London, with his dead mother, whom he keeps in the cupboard, and Craig Phillips, winner of the first series of Big Brother UK, whom he keeps chained up in the toilet. With his slurred and broken English, a ginger mullet, eccentricity, bisexuality, peculiar sexual fetishes, poor social skills and obsession with showbiz figures, he became known as one of the scariest celebrity stalkers. He wears a neck brace which he says is due to an encounter with Liza Tarbuck. He spends most of his time harassing celebrities at functions such as book signings or movie premières, highlights of which are shown throughout the first two series. Due to his nature, he became noticed by the media during the third series of Big Brother, after he repeatedly attempted to break into the house to get closer to the house mates. By the third series of this show, his newly elevated status in pop culture allowed him to talk one-on-one with celebrities, rather than stalking them. His segments in the series were transformed into his own chat show. In Bo! in the USA, Avid has given up his job as a chat show host, and now owns a hotel in Los Angeles, where many celebrities come to stay.

=== The Bear ===
The Bear, played by Leigh Francis with a puppet body, is also one of the main protagonists of the series. During series one, the bear's segment, entitled "Showbiz Chat", featured a regular celebrity guest chatting to The Bear, in a location which is only described as "up a tree, on Hampstead Heath". In series two, the segment was upgraded, and entitled "Bedtime with the Bear". The segment featured a similar format, with the exception of the ending, in which the guest would read the Bear a bedtime story, which would feature themselves and other celebrities becoming involved in vulgar activities. The stories would always give the Bear an erection, which he would describe as his tail popping out. He has an extreme hatred of Stephen, a ginger squirrel, whom he often calls "a knob jockey". In series three, "A Bear's Showbiz Tail" saw The Bear go on location to interview celebrities. When Avid fails to turn up for the last episode of series three, The Bear is given hosting duties, which resulted in his own Christmas special, "A Bear's Christmas Tail", and the entire fourth series being based around his adventures. In Bo' in the USA, he once again had his own segment in which he interviews celebrities. The sketches featured The Bear alongside Verne Troyer, who was shown to be The Bear's agent since his move to America. The Bear later appeared in the 2018 ITV2 series Keith Lemon - Coming in America and in the video for Keith Lemon's all star charity version of "Do They Know It's Christmas" in 2020, with pop stars like Rick Astley, Emma Bunton, Pixie Lott and Matt Goss.

=== Ozzey ===
Ozzey is a recurring character played by Ozzy Rezat. Ozzey was Avid Merrion's landlord. He used to make T-shirts for Avid downstairs, but after Avid got a talk show Ozzey was made part of the wardrobe department. Ozzey was a refugee who escaped to England for an unknown reason. In the first episode of series three he accidentally said it out loud and was told off by Avid. He was also made gay in series three, leading to a sketch where Avid would say television has changed into a 'blank', which would immediately cut to an impersonation of Blankety Blank. All the contestants would be gay celebrities, such as Elton John, Boy George and George Michael. After Bo' Selecta! ended and The Bear got his own show, A Bear's Tail, Ozzey had moved in with Sue Dales and Dave Ian McCall. When Bo' Selecta! returned as a new form, Bo! in the USA, Ozzey was not shown.

== Supporting characters ==
=== The Craig ===
The Craig is played by Craig Phillips as himself, following his appearance on Big Brother he has been kidnapped by Avid and lives chained up in his closet. Craig is sometimes brought out of the cupboard to sit chained up and socialise with Avid and Ozzey.

=== The Beckhams ===
David Beckham is childlike and Victoria acts as his mother. In one scene, a journalist asks David if he might be going to Milan, David replied saying: "No, I go to my nan's on Sunday, you silly!" he speaks with a slight lisp and is always asking when it's time for his dinner. Victoria is often grouchy and makes a pig sound while speaking. They only usually appear in either "The Week In Bits" or in the intros and outros.

=== Kat Slater ===
Kat Slater is portrayed as having the arms of a pig, which she regularly refers to as her "big flappy bingo wings". She believes everyone in EastEnders is secretly talking about her bingo wings. She speaks with a loud gruff cockney accent, and often talks about being married to Shane Richie. Invariably, a real life male cast member will tell Kat how much he loves her bingo wings, more than Shane ever could.

=== Christina Aguilera ===
In Bo' Selecta, Christina Aguilera is portrayed as a slut, in a reference to her song Dirrty. She speaks in a strong Liverpool accent and wears revealing clothes. She uses the phrase "I'm dead dirrttyyy" at the end of her segment. She first appeared in the second series, where she showed her "Crib" and launched her own video game. She is also a prostitute and sex-obsessed. It's suggested she has a long sausage-like big toe on her right foot.

=== Elton John ===
Elton John is extremely camp and aggressive. He is always talking about "gayness" and threatens to "Bum you!", meaning having anal sex. Elton often misinterprets questions and also is seen killing his postmen with an axe and claims to hate people. He is usually seen in "The Week In Bits" segment. In Ho Ho Ho Selecta, he delivers his own Queen's speech. He also appeared in Bo! in the USA.

=== Gareth Gates ===
Gareth Gates first appears in series one, in a segment in which he suffers a Tourette-like syndrome. He speaks with a strong Scottish accent and spiked hair. He also appeared in a lot of "The Week In Bits" sketches throughout the second series, in which he was always trying to say something, but couldn't due to his stutter. He can, however, get frustrated enough with his stutter to sing his sentence clearly, though it rarely happens.

=== Enrique Iglesias' Mole ===
Throughout the first series, a sketch where singer Enrique Iglesias's mole would show short segments of what the celebrity characters had been doing during the week was broadcast. The mole spoke with a Geordie accent and at the end would give advice to anyone with a mole how they could torture other people who make remarks about their "mole". This sketch was called "The Week In Whole By Enrique's Mole". This was replaced by "Jordan/Jodie Marsh's Tits".

=== Jordan/Jodie Marsh's Tits ===
In the second, there was a sketch similar to "The Week In Whole...", but this time using Jordan's nipples. The nipple would always talk critically about a celebrity and would say at the end, "That was the week in bits...You slags!". The other nipple would also add an odd sexual sound at the end of the sketch. Halfway through the second series, Jordan's Tits was replaced by Jodie Marsh's Tits, with a different visual intro and voice from the Jordan one, but essentially the same sketch.

=== Sacha Merrion ===
Sacha Merrion, played by Barunka O'Shaughnessy, is the wife and sister of Avid Merrion; she first appeared as a guest star on A Bear's Tail as a co-host of Avid's talk show. For Bo! in the USA, Sacha and Avid run a hotel which is currently home to various celebrities such as Craig David and even the Bear. In the third episode of Bo! in the USA, it is revealed that Avid did not seem to be as romantic as before and she seems to take a liking to the Mexican half-wolf half-man head cleaner Ralph. In episode four, she went behind Avid's back with Ralph, but was caught. She later apologised to Avid, however, he then admitted he had been stalking a female celebrity, so both decided to forgive each other and have a baby.

=== Marilyn Manson ===
Speaking in a rough though quite British, upper class voice, he appears to be a friendly, very well mannered man. He appears in series 2 and 3, though is mostly in filler segments in 2. He's said to have adopted a West Indian Manatee, which is doing a tour of Sea World. He's rude, but not as vulgar as other characters. His catchphrase is "Wicked, what?" in which he elongates the W of 'Wicked'.

=== Trisha Goddard ===
Speaking in a heavy Jamaican accent, Trisha is present in series 2 and 3, though only in ads for her products in 3. In 2, she hosts "The Trisha Show", which is a travelling version of her actual (though now ended) talk show. She's often seen with a dog and is obsessed with rice and peas, believing when eaten or when shouted, it makes you feel better. When she is being aggressive, she calls people "bumblesquat", though says "kiss me teeth" when happy with herself and "irie" as a compliment. Though she says these and "bogle bogle" quite a few times, "rice and peas" is her catchphrase.

=== Davina McCall ===
A hyperactive and very over-excited host of Big Brother UK, seen in series 2 and 3. Always pregnant and often crazed with the thought of having someone, anyone, make her pregnant (it's suggested she may have even forced her husband into sex by handcuffing him to the bed). She insists that everyone, interview or not, do not say Fuck or Bugger (this being her catchphrase) though she more than often calls people a fucking bugger. Ironically, she refers to sex as 'Nookie' and often makes bets (of about 25 to 35 pence) with people on who'll win Big Brother or if someone will have Nookie. She ends many of her sentences with "for myself/himself/herself" (e.g. "I'm Davina McCall for myself.")

=== Jonathan Ross ===
Found in series 2 and 3, he's often interviewing people or giving reviews. He's always calm and often makes no logical sense in conversation, most normal words replaced with 'wibble', 'wobble', 'wibbly' or other W based sounds (based on his rhotacism). He often asks if there's any vaginal or breast sightings in movies and rates them (U, PG, 18 etc.) accordingly. When reviewing a film, he gives his own rating (similar to stars or thumbs up) in the form of eggs, often giving a half afterwards and smashing an egg on the table, throwing half into the egg cup. He does not do this in series 3.

=== Ricky Gervais ===
Appearing in series 2, Ricky is portrayed as having a rough Cockney accent and always wearing a pair of boxing gloves. He keeps a gold star chart up in his 'office', which he puts stickers up on whenever he is recognised by members of the public. It is revealed it is often him getting in the way of people, as he pretends to act as if somebody completely uninterested in him has recognised him, in which he proceeds to dance like the character he plays in The Office David Brent. His catchphrases are "I'm Ricky Gervais, obviously." and " You recognize me, don't ya? "

=== Richard Madeley and Judy Finnigan ===
While Judy is silent constantly, often trembling and performing nervous traits (like chewing her nails) with her breast slipping out of her shirt on occasion, Richard is seen as controlling, telling the silent Judy not to speak and blaming her for talking should anything go wrong. He is also seen raising a hand to strike her, suggesting he has frightened her into a silent and submissive state. They are never seen apart.

=== Trinny Woodall and Susannah Constantine ===
The pair are portrayed as a lesbian couple, and it is strongly suggested that Trinny is transgender. They both have an obsession with other women's breasts, calling them "Baps". This often leads to "Pudding Time", in which the pair begin to kiss and is suggested they have intercourse. They are never seen apart either.

=== Lorraine Kelly ===
Speaking in a deep Scottish accent, almost man-like in tone, she is often seen on her chair in the GMTV studio. Regardless of her guests sexuality, she often spreads her (ridiculously tiny) legs to reveal her "growler" (vagina). This became her catchphrase ("Can you see ma growler?").

=== Nadia Almada ===
The transgender winner of Big Brother UK 2004, Nadia Almada is portrayed as a high pitched Mexican woman who still keeps her male genitals, often slipping down into a deep male voice on occasion. Davina McCall never knows what to call Nadia, so often refers to her as "Herself, Himself, ITself". She appears to have some form of split personality, her deep voice appearing on certain occasions, such as panic or even anger when she slaps another housemate in the face. Her testicles are often seen (and heard) bouncing around to add to comical humour.

=== Martine McCutcheon ===
A singer famous for the song 'Perfect Moment'. Often singing it before throwing up violently. After saying something she's done, she asks what's other people's perfect moment, before throwing up again. Once they've explained, she's seen throwing up before saying "Perfect!".

=== George Michael ===
Seen as extremely camp and a sexual deviant, he's often heard saying "Don't you worry about it!" (his catchphrase). He's best described as a gay stereotype, complete with camp voice and behaviour. He often refers to the time he pleasured two men in a public toilet, saying he 'skied really violently with them' (based on the real-life situation when he was caught doing the same act).

=== Simon Cowell ===
Portrayed as having hairy arms, jiggly manboobs and an unusually big chin, he says to have invented things such as the Grammys and even real people like Michael Jackson, Uri Geller and Leona Lewis. His catchphrase is repeating the word 'potentially'.

=== Ant and Dec ===
Ant and Dec are the presenters of the TV show 'Ant Man & Dec Pet's Take Out', a parody of their real life programme Ant & Dec's Saturday Night Takeaway. Ant is portrayed as having a high forehead and pants like a dog (he explains to Dec in one sketch this is because of all the blood rushing down from his forehead), whilst Dec constantly quotes his father and can be seen twitching. The sketches all revolve around Ant being sodomised by a celebrity guest using strange items (such as a satellite dish and a snooker cue), whilst Dec goes backstage to 'have a stotty cake'. In the last ever sketch, Ant is sodomised by Dec himself, but as Dec says "I won't be using an implement, I'll be using me manhood".

=== Oprah Winfrey ===
Oprah Winfrey appears in the fifth series, 'Bo in the USA' as the host of her eponymous talk show, interviewing celebrities such as Madonna, Michael Jackson or people with hideous deformities (such as a girl with pig trotters). She is portrayed in heavy blackface, speaks with stereotypical African-American Vernacular English and wears a large gold chain around her neck, often talking about her love for fried chicken. Her segments also involve appearances by Cliff Huxtable from The Cosby Show (also in heavy blackface) showing off his colourful sweaters.
