= The Water Babies (disambiguation) =

The Water-Babies is a novel by Charles Kingsley published in 1863. The Water Babies, Water Babies, or Water Baby may refer to:

== Film ==
- The Water Babies (film), a 1978 live action/animated film based on the novel
- Water Babies (1935 film), a 1935 animated short film in the Silly Symphonies series
- The Water Babies, a 2003 musical by Jason Carr and Gary Yershon, based on the novel, directed by Jeremy Sams
- Water Baby (film), a 2016 short film

== Music ==
- Water Babies (album), a 1976 album by Miles Davis, taking its name from the title tune written by Wayne Shorter. The name of the tune is probably inspired by the novel.
- The Water Babies, a UK band who released the 2005 single "Under the Tree"
- "Water Baby" (song), a song by English musician Tom Misch

== Other uses ==
- Water birth, a childbirth that occurs in water
- Water baby syndrome, an older, alternative name for hydrocephalus
- Mizuko kuyō, the stillborn, aborted, and miscarried in Japan
- Water baby (folklore), a type of spirit from Great Basin folklore
- Water Baby (novel), a 2024 novel by Chioma Okereke

== See also ==
- "Water Baby Blues", an instrumental by Merl Lindsay
