= List of Christmas hit singles =

List of Christmas hit singles may refer to:

- List of Christmas hit singles in the United Kingdom
- List of popular Christmas singles in the United States
