= Rose Maddox =

American singer-songwriter

- Also known as: Rose Maddox Brogdon
- Born: Roselea Arbana Maddox; August 15, 1925; Boaz, Alabama, US
- Died: April 15, 1998 (aged 72); Ashland, Oregon, US
- Genres: Country
- Occupations: Singer, songwriter
- Instruments: Vocals, fiddle
- Years active: 1937–1997
- Labels: Columbia, Capitol, Takoma, Arhoolie
- Formerly of: Maddox Brothers and Rose; Buck Owens, The Strangers, Hillbilly Boogiemen

Roselea Arbana "Rose" Maddox (Note: Many sources give her birth name as Brogdon. This is an error. She was recorded, with her birth family, as Rose Maddox in the 1940 US Census, and other sources report her second husband's name as Brogdon.) (August 15, 1925 – April 15, 1998) was an American country singer-songwriter and fiddle player, who was the lead singer with the Maddox Brothers and Rose before a successful solo career. Her musical styles blended hillbilly music, rockabilly and gospel. She was noted for her "reputation as a lusty firebrand", and her "colorful Western costumes"; she was one of the earliest clients of Hollywood tailor, Nathan Turk.

== Biography ==
She was born in Boaz, Alabama, and traveled west at age seven with her family, who had been sharecroppers. She later said in an interview:

Cotton prices failed in Alabama. So we left for California, the Land of Milk and Honey... We only had $35 when we left there, and a dream of going to California. That was my mother's dream. Hitchhikin'. All of us. Five kids.... The brakemen helped us get on the right trains and they got us food from the caboose. Sometimes the brakemen locked us in the boxcars and told us to be quiet.... We got to Los Angeles, California, in 1933. The Salvation Army heard there was a family coming. They didn't have enough room there, so Dad and Cal slept in jail. At least it was a place to stay. We went from L.A. up to Oakland on the freights. We lived in Pipe City. There were these huge culvert pipes and all the migrants were living inside culverts. The mayor of Pipe City gave us his pipe to stay in. My mother got tired of asking for food every day. That's when we hit the front page of the Oakland Tribune as a family come west on the freights looking for work.

After her father eventually found work, the family ended up in Modesto, California. Rose first performed with her brothers in amateur shows at age 11, and while in her teens, began performing with them on local radio station KTRB. The station offered her brothers a regular slot with the condition that Rose sing with them, despite the opposition of their mother, who managed the group. After the brothers had served in World War II, Rose first recorded with them for 4 Star Records in 1947. The group began to gain success in the late 1940s, and she and her brothers moved to Hollywood.

They toured widely, and appeared regularly on the Louisiana Hayride radio show. Rose became noted for her colorful performances, once shocking a Grand Ole Opry audience by appearing with a bare midriff. She also recorded as a duo, Rosie and Retta, with her sister-in-law. Her first marriage was to E.B. Hale during the second World War when she was 16. She married club owner Jim Brogdon in the late 1950s; they separated after six years.

After the Maddox Brothers group broke up in 1957, Rose initially performed with her brother Cal and subsequently started a solo career. She had 14 hits on the Billboard country singles chart between 1959 and 1964, including several duets with Buck Owens, and also recorded with Bill Monroe. Her biggest hit "Sing a Little Song of Heartache" reached number 3 on the country chart at the end of 1962. She began to specialize in bluegrass recordings, recording the commercially successful and influential album Rose Maddox Sings Bluegrass for Capitol Records. After her contract with the company ended in 1965, she began to concentrate on tours, performing with her brothers Cal and Henry and son Donnie (who died in 1982) in the UK, Europe and elsewhere. She also performed regularly with bluegrass musician Vern Williams.

She suffered several heart attacks from the late 1960s onward, but continued to perform and record for several labels. In 1996, she was nominated for a Grammy Award for her Arhoolie bluegrass album, $35 and a Dream. Her final album was The Moon Is Rising, also in 1996.

Maddox also acted in movies, including The Hi-Lo Country (1998), and the documentaries The Women of Country (1993) and Woody Guthrie: Hard Travelin' (1984).

In later years, she lived in Ashland, Oregon, near where her brother Don Maddox had bought a ranch in 1958. She died in Ashland of kidney failure in 1998 at age 72.

== Legacy ==
Emmylou Harris believes Maddox has never received the recognition she deserves, in part because of what Harris calls a reluctance in American society to celebrate the value of white country and roots music. Dolly Parton also credits Maddox as an early influence. Laura Cantrell's song "California Rose" was written in memory of Maddox.

Her life story and that of the band were told in the biography Ramblin' Rose: The Life and Career of Rose Maddox by Jonny Whiteside. The book won an award for excellence in 1998 from the Association for Recorded Sound Collections (ARSC).

== Discography ==
=== Albums ===
Maddox Brothers and Rose

- A Collection of Standard Sacred Songs (King, 1959)
- Maddox Bros. and Rose (King, 1960)
- I'll Write Your Name in the Sand (King, 1961)
- Maddox Brothers and Rose (Wrangler, 1962)
- Go Honky Tonkin! (Hilltop, 1965)
- America's Most Colorful Hillbilly Band, v.1 (Arhoolie, 1976 [LP]; 1993 [CD])
- America's Most Colorful Hillbilly Band, v.2 (Arhoolie, 1976 [LP]; 1995 [CD])
- Old Pals of Yesterday (Picc-A-Dilly, 1980)
- On the Air, v.1 (Arhoolie, 1983 [LP]; 1996 [CD])
- Maddox Bros. and Rose: Columbia Historic Edition (Columbia, 1984)
- On the Air, v.2 (Arhoolie, 1985 [LP]; 1996 [CD])
- Live – On the Radio (Arhoolie, 1996) recorded 1953
- The Hillbilly Boogie Years (Rockateer, 1996) all Columbia recordings
- The Most Colorful Hillbilly Band in America (Bear Family, 1998) 4-CD set
- A Proper Introduction to Maddox Brothers & Rose: That'll Learn Ya Durn Ya (Proper, 2004)

Solo/Compilations

- Precious Memories (Columbia, 1958)
- The One Rose (Capitol, 1960)
- Glorybound Train (Capitol, 1961)
- A Big Bouquet of Roses (Capitol, 1961)
- Rose Maddox Sings Bluegrass (Capitol, 1962 [LP]; 1996 [CD])
- Alone with You (Capitol, 1963)
- Rosie (Starday, 1970)
- Reckless Love & Bold Adventure (Takoma, 1977)
- Rose of the West Coast Country (Arhoolie, 1980)
- This is Rose Maddox (Arhoolie, 1982)
- A Beautiful Bouquet (Arhoolie, 1983)
- Queen of the West (Varrick, 1984) (with The Strangers)
- California Rose (See for Miles, 1989)
- $35 and a Dream (Arhoolie, 1994)
- The One Rose: The Capitol Years (Bear Family, 1994) 4-CD set
- The Moon is Rising (Country Town Music, 1996)
- The Legendary Queen of the West (Boothill, 2000)

=== Chart singles ===
Year	Single	US Country
1959	"Gambler's Love"	22
1961	"Kissing My Pillow"	14
1961	"I Want to Live Again"	15
1961	"Mental Cruelty" (with Buck Owens)	8
1961	"Loose Talk" (with Buck Owens)	4
1961	"Conscience, I'm Guilty"	14
1962	"Sing a Little Song of Heartache"	3
1963	"Lonely Teardrops"	18
1963	"Down to the River"	18
1963	"We're the Talk of the Town" (with Buck Owens)	15
1963	"Sweethearts in Heaven" (with Buck Owens)	19
1963	"Somebody Told Somebody"	18
1964	"Alone with You"	44
1964	"Blue Bird Let Me Tag Along"	30
