= The Bear (Bo' Selecta!) =

Fictional character

The Bear is a fictional character who originated in the British adult sketch comedy, Bo' Selecta!. Played by Leigh Francis, he is a rude teddy bear who is a social outcast and engages in cursing and womanising. He likes berries and always wears black glasses. He had a sidekick, a squirrel named Steven, whom he had a love-hate relationship with.

The character was popular enough to receive his own show, A Bear's Tail, derived from the Christmas pilot. Since the end of A Bear's Tail, the Bear has been featured in Bo' in the USA.

In 2005, Nintendo made the Bear the face of Nintendo DS UK.

== Personality ==
The Bear often flirts with women, who guest-star on the show. In an episode of Bo' Selecta!, it was revealed that he used to have a problem, which caused him to shout out bad words at anyone. He has, however, broken the habit of thinking of women to take his mind off of it. After fantasizing about women, his "tail" will pop out. He gets it to "go away" by saying, "Christine Hamilton", three times, as seen in an episode, in which Hamilton herself guest starred. However, when Hamilton guest-starred in an episode, the Bear had to say it in his mind.

== Friends and family ==
The Bear often speaks about his parents, who left him behind and went to Alaska. They did appear in an episode of A Bear's Tail and wanted him back. They soon saw how well he was getting on in his new home and let him stay. The only other relative is his uncle, who is a dancing bear. The Bear stated that he was chained up by his nose and once tried to escape and ripped half his nose off and had to have it stitched up.

The Bear's only seen friend was a red squirrel named Steven. Steven would communicate via squeaks and would usually say something rude, to which he would be told off by the Bear.

== Bedtime with the Bear ==
For the first series of Bo' Selecta!, the Bear had a talk show in his treehouse on Hampstead Heath called Bedtime with the Bear, which featured women, whom he would ask rude questions to. The format changed slightly for series 2, which featured him still hosting a talk show, but with one difference: A bedtime story. Bedtime stories feature the Bear, spotting something rude, that the guests are doing to the guest's surprise. This usually gives him an erection.

As of series 3 of Bo' Selecta!, the Bear had his own part on Avid Merrion's talk show. He would speak to guests as usual in the same dirty manner, except it featured him on an actual talk show set. He has interviewed the likes of Kerry Katona, Jennifer Ellison, Liberty X, Edith Bowman, Christine Hamilton, Vernon Kay, Jonathan Ross, Catalina Guirado, Tess Daley, and Melanie Blatt in Bedtime with the Bear.

== A Bear's Tail ==
In his own spin-off series, A Bear's Tail, the Bear was adopted by the Hennersons after they ran him over in their car at Christmas. The mother of the family was played by Patsy Kensit, who adored the Bear. The father though, who was played by Sean Pertwee, hated the Bear after he thought that the Bear was stealing his wife. There was also a stroppy teenage daughter, Lillian Hennerson, who would argue with the Bear.

The series only lasted for one year, as Leigh Francis decided to bring back Bo' Selecta!, but in America.

== Bo! in the USA ==
Leigh Francis brought Bo' Selecta! back as "Bo'" in the United States, in which it featured the whole series in America, instead of Britain. The Bear (and many other celebrities) are staying at the Merrion Hotel. The Bear is currently friends with Verne Troyer, who played Mini-Me in Austin Powers. Verne wants to revamp the Bear's show, because he thought that A Bear's Tail was rubbish, along with many other characters.

== Keith Lemon: Coming in America ==
The Bear made his television comeback in the 2018 ITV2 series Keith Lemon: Coming in America. He appears in the third episode where he meets the Urban Fox, who like the Bear, had moved to America. In the same episode, it is revealed by the Bear that Steven got attacked by four grey squirrels and had his back legs chewed off. As he was in pain, the Bear put him out of his misery by hitting him with a spade.

== Whatever I Want ==
The Bear was previously portrayed before Bo Selecta!, on a short lived programme entitled "Whatever I Want", shown on London Weekend Television. He was not a bear, however, but a man named Barry Gibson. The character is almost exactly the same, except he is in human form.
