= The Michael Ball Show =

- Genre: Entertainment
- Presented by: Michael Ball
- Composer: Music 4
- Country of origin: United Kingdom
- No. of series: 1
- No. of episodes: 30

Production
- Producer: Spun Gold TV
- Production location: BBC Television Centre
- Running time: 60 minutes (including advertisements)

Original release
- Network: ITV
- Release: 16 August – 24 September 2010

The Michael Ball Show is a British topical entertainment show broadcast on ITV in 2010. It featured entertainment, discussion and showbiz glamour with the occasional musical performance from Michael himself, often on the Friday edition of the show. It occupied the slot filled by The Alan Titchmarsh Show during its summer break in 2010.

== Format ==
Part one of the show featured Michael and four of the day's guests discussing a topic of the day. The guests were usually the two main guests along with the Cash for Questions quiz-master and either the musical guest or the chef of the day. The second part of the show featured an interview with a guest, who is unknown, not a celebrity, with a story which they tell before Michael and the day's chef cook a guest's favourite a dish which they serve to her or him.

Part three of the show was a brief chat with the musical guest who then performed. Part three also featured a chat with a special guest. The fourth and final part of the show started off with the viewer competition Cash for Questions. To finish off the show, Michael was joined by his final special guest of the day.

There was often a musical theatre theme to The Michael Ball Show, with guests such as Sir Cameron Mackintosh, Lord Andrew Lloyd Webber and Kerry Ellis, and performances from the casts of shows including Wicked, Billy Elliot and Love Never Dies appearing on the show.

=== Cash for Questions ===
Each day, there was new question and the prize fund was determined by Cash for Questions, the viewer competition in which Michael himself takes part in answering questions given by the day's quizmaster. Each question was worth £100, and the amount in the fund after one minute was the prize for the viewer competition. The quizmaster was the same person on each week depending on the day, with the quizmasters remaining the same throughout the series. They were:

Day	Quizmaster
Monday	Christine Hamilton
Tuesday	Mica Paris
Wednesday	Eve Pollard; Trevor McDonald
Thursday	Penny Smith
Friday	Kim Woodburn; Jacqui Joseph

== Filming and broadcast ==
The show was pre-recorded at BBC Television Centre's studio TC3 in London. It was recorded on Wednesdays and Thursdays and broadcast Monday to Friday on ITV.

The show was originally commissioned for Summer 2010, to be shown whilst The Alan Titchmarsh Show was on its summer break. ITV did not commission a second series.

== Episodes ==
No.	Guests	Original release date
1	Katie Price • Les Dennis • Kim Woodburn • Rachel Allen	16 August 2010
2	Katie Derham • Russ Abbot • The Saturdays • Jo Pratt • Mica Paris	17 August 2010
3	Joanna Lumley • Brendan Cole • Adam Garcia • Rachel Allen • Jacqui Joseph	18 August 2010
4	Christopher Biggins • Jennie McAlpine • Craig David • Jo Pratt • Penny Smith	19 August 2010
5	Konnie Huq • Omid Djalili • Christine Hamilton • Rachel Allen • Craig Phillips	20 August 2010
6	Colin and Justin • Jimi Mistry • Ellie Goulding • Jo Pratt • Christine Hamilton	23 August 2010
7	Suzanne Shaw • Bill Paterson • Joshua Radin • Mica Paris • Matt Tebbutt	24 August 2010
8	Cameron Mackintosh • Michael Aspel • Gareth Gates • Eve Pollard • Paul Rankin	25 August 2010
9	Vidal Sassoon • Jodie Prenger • Gabriella Cilmi • Penny Smith • Matt Tebbutt	26 August 2010
10	Whoopi Goldberg • Stephen Mulhern • Jacqui Joseph • Eve Pollard • Paul Rankin	27 August 2010
11	Jason Manford • Tony Hadley • Katie Melua • Matt Tebbutt • Christine Hamilton	30 August 2010
12	Rick Astley • Michelle Collins • Mica Paris • Paul Rankin • Hayley Westenra	31 August 2010
13	Alistair McGowan • Maxwell Caulfield • Juliet Mills • Cast of Billy Elliot • Eve Pollard • Paul Rankin	1 September 2010
14	Brian Conley • Kerry Ellis • Brian May • Jo Pratt • Penny Smith	2 September 2010
15	Amanda Redman • Olly Murs • Jacqui Joseph • Paul Rankin	3 September 2010
16	Terry Wogan • Arlene Phillips • Pixie Lott • Jo Pratt • Christine Hamilton • Katie Piper	6 September 2010
17	Jedward • Lynda Baron • Amy Macdonald • Paul Rankin • Mica Paris	7 September 2010
18	Alexei Sayle • Alesha Dixon • Eve Pollard • Jo Pratt	8 September 2010
19	Lulu • Bruno Tonioli • Tony Christie • Penny Smith • Clarissa Dickson Wright	9 September 2010
20	Andrew Lloyd Webber • Jackie Collins • Ramin Karimloo • Jacqui Joseph • Matt Tebbutt • Helen Newlove	10 September 2010
21	Simon Callow • Dom Joly • Sharon Corr • Clarissa Dickson Wright • Christine Hamilton • Frazer Hines	13 September 2010
22	Michael Gambon • Fiona Phillips • The Script • Mica Paris • Matt Tebbutt	14 September 2010
23	Richard Madeley • Judy Finnigan • Gareth Malone • McFly • Eve Pollard • Clarissa Dickson Wright	15 September 2010
24	Imelda Staunton • JLS • André Rieu • Penny Smith • Matt Tebbutt	16 September 2010
25	John Barrowman • Cast of Warhorse • Alan Davies • Kim Woodburn • Clarissa Dickson Wright	17 September 2010
26	Fern Britton • David Haig • Lee Mead • Rachel Tucker • Christine Hamilton • Paul Rankin	20 September 2010
27	Trinny Woodall • Susannah Constantine • Alex Reid • Scouting for Girls • Clarissa Dickson Wright • Mica Paris	21 September 2010
28	Carol Vorderman • Val Doonican • Cast of Jersey Boys • Eve Pollard • Paul Rankin	22 September 2010
29	Coleen Nolan • Nick Moran • Con O'Neill • Maroon 5 • Penny Smith • Clarissa Dickson Wright • PC David Rathband	23 September 2010
30	Nigel Planer • Monsters of Doctor Who • Helen Worth • Geraldine James • Paul Rankin • Kim Woodburn	24 September 2010
