= Under the Tree =

Under the Tree may refer to:

- "Under the Tree" (The Water Babies song), 2005
- "Under the Tree" (SiM song), 2023
- "Under the Tree" (Ed Sheeran song), 2024
- Under the Tree (2008 film), a film by Garin Nugroho
- Under the Tree (2017 film), an Icelandic film
