= Glory, Glory (Lay My Burden Down) =

American spiritual song

"Glory, Glory" (also known as "When I Lay My Burden Down", "Since I Laid My Burden Down", "Glory, Glory, Hallelujah" and other titles) is an American spiritual song, which has been recorded by many artists in a variety of genres, including folk, country, blues, rock, and gospel. It is typically very melodically similar to another popular gospel song, "Will the Circle Be Unbroken".

== Lyrics ==
Lyrically, the song has many variations, but the best-known version of the song (as performed by Odetta or Roy Acuff) opens with:

Glory glory, hallelujah
Since I laid my burden down
Glory glory, hallelujah
Since I laid my burden down

== Selected recordings ==
"Glory, Glory"
- 1971 German picture sleeve

Single by The Byrds

from the album Byrdmaniax
- B-side: "Citizen Kane" (US/UK); "I Wanna Grow Up to Be a Politician" (Europe)
- Released: August 20, 1971
- Recorded: January 17, 1971
- Studio: Columbia, Hollywood, California
- Genre: Rock
- Length: 4:03
- Label: Columbia
- Songwriter: Arthur Reynolds
- Producers: Terry Melcher, Chris Hinshaw

The Byrds singles chronology
"I Trust (Everything Is Gonna Work Out Alright)" (1971)	"Glory, Glory" (1971)	"America's Great National Pastime" (1971)

- The Elders McIntorsh and Edwards' Sanctified Singers – "Since I Laid My Burden Down" (recorded Chicago, December 4, 1928)
- Blind Roosevelt Graves – "When I Lay My Burdens Down" (Complete Recorded Works in Chronological Order, recorded in 1936)
- Maddox Brothers and Rose – "When I Lay My Burden Down" (recorded between 1946 and 1951 and included on the compilation The Maddox Brothers and Rose – Vol. 1)
- The Soul Stirrers – "Glory, Glory Hallelujah" (1948)
- Odetta – "Glory, Glory" (Odetta Sings Ballads and Blues, 1956)
- The Big 3 – "Glory, Glory" (Live at the Recording Studio, 1964)
- Mississippi John Hurt – "Since I've Laid This Burden Down" (The Best of Mississippi John Hurt, 1966)
- Furry Lewis – "Lay My Burden Down" (Blues Magician, recorded 1969)
- Mississippi Fred McDowell – "When I Lay My Burden Down" (1964)
- Roy Acuff – "When I Lay My Burden Down" (Night Train to Memphis, 1970)
- The Byrds – "Glory, Glory" (Byrdmaniax, 1971)
- Ike & Tina Turner – "Glory, Glory" (The Gospel According to Ike & Tina, 1974)
- Otha Turner – "Glory, Glory Hallelujah" (From Senegal to Senatobia, 1999)
- Dr. John with Mavis Staples and The Dirty Dozen Brass Band – "Lay My Burden Down" (N'Awlinz Dis, Dat, or D'Udda, 2005)
- Larry Sparks – "Lay My Burden Down" (Transamerica, 2005)
- Glenn Kaiser – "Since I Laid My Burdens Down" (Grrrecords, 2006)
- City and Colour & The Coppertone – "When I Lay My Burden Down" ("Wood & Wires Productions", c. 2010)
- Johnny Thunders – "Glory, Glory" (Sticks and Stones: The Lost Album, 2009 (recorded 1990))
- Will McFarlane – "Lay My Burden Down" (Will McFarlane, c. 2015)

== In pop culture ==
The Ike & Tina Turner version of the song appears in the end credits of the 2026 film Project Hail Mary.
