= Bo' Selecta! =

Television series

- Title screen
- Genre: Sketch comedy
- Created by: Leigh Francis
- Developed by: Leigh Francis; Ben Palmer
- Starring: Leigh Francis (Series 1–5); Craig Phillips (Series 1–2); Caroline Flack (Series 1–3); Ozzy Rezat (Series 1–3); Patsy Kensit (Series 3–4); Karen Hayley (Series 3–4); Barunka O'Shaughnessy (Series 4–5); Dexter Fletcher (Series 4); Sean Pertwee (Series 4); Luis Fernandez-Gil (Series 5); Robert Stone (Series 5)
- Country of origin: United Kingdom
- Original language: English
- No. of series: 5
- No. of episodes: 45 (list of episodes)

Production
- Executive producer: Spencer Millman
- Running time: 30 minutes (including commercials)
- Production company: Talkback

Original release
- Network: Channel 4
- Release: 6 September 2002 – 18 December 2009

Bo' Selecta! is a British television sketch show written and performed by Leigh Francis. It was broadcast on Channel 4 from 2002 until 2009 and lampooned popular culture, becoming known for its often surreal, abstract toilet humour. Series 4 was known as A Bear's Tail while Series 5 shifted filming to the United States and was called Bo! In the USA. The show consists of comedy sketches of characters played by Francis wearing exaggerated latex masks of various celebrities, with minor support roles over the years played by Craig Phillips, Caroline Flack, Ozzy Rezat, Patsy Kensit, Karen Hayley, Barunka O'Shaughnessy, Dexter Fletcher, Sean Pertwee, Luis Fernandez-Gil and Robert Stone.

In June 2020, after an agreement between Channel 4 and Francis, the show was taken down from All 4 following backlash over its frequent use of blackface.

== Background ==
Bo' Selecta! was broadcast on Channel 4 and ran for three series between 2002 and 2004, spawning several spin-offs. Francis played central character Avid Merrion, a dangerously insane stalker, who is obsessed with celebrities and tracks them down. The show consists of sketches featuring caricatures of British and American celebrities, portrayed by Francis wearing latex facemasks with exaggerated facial features. The most popular sketches involve entertainers such as Elton John, who is portrayed as being angry, aggressive and antisocial (in one episode he says he shops on the internet due to his hatred for society), David Blaine, Kelly Osbourne, who comes off as calm and laid back at first and then begins ranting uncontrollably at the camera, Michael Jackson, a foul mouthed mental patient who has tics in the form of "hee-hees"; Mel B, who has a strong Northern accent; and central character Craig David, an egotistical Yorkshireman who owns a plastic peregrine falcon named Kes, a reference to the 1969 drama film of the same name. Avid Merrion would appear in his own sketches placed throughout each episode. Another recurring character on the show played by Francis is "the Bear", a perverted teddy bear who interviews genuine celebrity guests, where he will make them read a bedtime story to him. Each story starts off the same way and ends with the celebrity (usually female) saying or doing something sexually suggestive, causing the Bear to have an erection (at which point he would shout "Christine Hamilton! Christine Hamilton!" or the name of another famous woman generally considered unattractive).

The series title is based on the title of the Artful Dodger and Craig David song "Re-Rewind (The Crowd Say Bo Selecta)". David is one of the main characters and speaks in catchphrases such as "proper bo I tell thee" and "can I get a reeewind". Much of the show's humour is derived from the deliberate ineptitude of each impersonation and general incongruity; scenes include Avid slapping Justin Timberlake with slices of cold meat, and trying to seduce Patsy Kensit while in character as Mel B.

Despite a loyal following and some strong reviews, the show has been criticised for allegedly promoting narrow-mindedness and puerile behaviour. Nevertheless, it was ranked 19th in Channel 4's 30 Greatest Comedy Shows as part of its 30th anniversary. The show was re-broadcast by 4Music. Christmas singles were released under the Bo' Selecta! banner, titled "Proper Crimbo" and the double A-side "I Got You Babe / Soda Pop". "Proper Crimbo" was released at Christmas 2003, peaking at No. 3 on the UK Singles Chart. "I Got You Babe / Soda Pop" was released at Christmas 2004, peaking at No. 4 on the UK Singles Chart.

== Characters ==
=== Avid Merrion ===
First appearing on Whatever I Want, Avid Merrion, played by Leigh Francis, is the main protagonist of the series. He is obsessed with celebrities and stalks them, after he grew up to become the number one celebrity super fan in the world. Originating from the small town of Arachnipuss near Transylvania, Avid was born to a father who was a Dracula-impersonating stripper. Avid lives in a flat in London, with his dead mother, whom he keeps in the cupboard, and Craig Phillips, winner of the first series of Big Brother UK, whom he keeps chained up in the toilet. With his slurred and broken English, a ginger mullet, eccentricity, bisexuality, peculiar sexual fetishes, poor social skills and obsession with showbiz figures, he became known as one of the scariest celebrity stalkers. He wears a neck brace which he says is due to an encounter with Liza Tarbuck. He spends most of his time harassing celebrities at functions such as book signings or film premières, highlights of which are shown throughout the first two series. Due to his nature, he became noticed by the media during the third series of Big Brother, after he repeatedly attempted to break into the house to get closer to the house mates. By the third series of this show, his newly elevated status in pop culture allowed him to talk one-on-one with celebrities, rather than stalking them. His segments in the series were transformed into his own chat show. In Bo! in the USA, Avid has given up his job as a chat show host, and now owns a hotel in Los Angeles, where many celebrities come to stay.

=== Craig David ===
Craig David is one of the main Bo' Selecta characters. His catchphrases are "Proper Reet Bo" and "Proper Bo, I tell thee!". He is portrayed as having a very large chin, with a beard made with a pen. Craig has a very strong Yorkshire accent. He is known for always singing his name. He carries around a plastic peregrine falcon on his wrist named "Kes", possibly as a reference to the film of the same name. Kes was apparently bought off a man in Huddersfield who had a dog with one leg. He calls Kes a "bastard", often when calling her to return. Craig also wears a beanie hat, and his iconic headphones from his Born to Do It album cover. In the first series, a segment titled "Craig David's Life Story" is featured, showing events such as David visiting the doctor to be fitted with a urostomy bag (which he often fails to wear at night and wets the bed), and attempting to break the American market but catches a flight to Mallorca by accident. For the second series, each episode segment follows him on his nationwide UK tour alongside his band (who hate him), in which he meets Michael Jackson, goes dating, goes for a walk, meets the real Craig David (depicted as an impersonator), and performs in front of a live audience. In the third series, he attempts to break America again with his new single "Soda Pop", which fails to chart. Along the way, he makes a music video and gets himself a makeover from Mel B. He appeared in Bo! in the USA, in a weekly segment in which he tries to seduce Holly Valance and earn himself a bronze swimming award. As time went on, Craig's fall from fame was chronicled as he started making appearances on shopping channels and in Cha'mone Mo'Fo' Selecta he was reduced to working in a call centre. Leigh Francis stated in an interview with Metro that the character was based on Billy Casper from Kes, rather than the singer Craig David.

=== Mel B ===
Mel B is portrayed as a drunk, scary, and dirty old woman. She has white skin, red hair, and a massive nose. She speaks in a northern accent, which is apparent when she says the word "fuck" like "fook", and wears a leopard-print top, revealing a disturbingly hairy chest. Her best known catchphrase is "yer bastard ya!", whilst often making remarks regarding lesbian sex and her minge, which she describes as smelling like crab paste. In the first series, she features in a segment in which she promotes her new book, which discusses the split of the Spice Girls and her love for her stuffed tiger. In the second series, she becomes a non-weekly character, only appearing three times during the series, appearing in segments when she goes on holiday, shows us her "Crib" and talks about Girls Aloud. In the third series, she becomes a regular character again, and appears in a segment titled "The Odd Couple". The segment shows her living with singer and actress Patsy Kensit, whom she is always trying to seduce and with whom she eventually has a drunken one night stand in the final episode. On the music video for Avid Merrion's cover for I Got You Babe (which also starred Patsy Kensit), Mel's father was revealed to be Jim Bowen. She also appears in Bo! in the USA, however, as a non-regular character. The real Mel B appeared a few times during the series.

=== Michael Jackson ===
Michael Jackson is portrayed as a vulgar mentally ill patient, usually beginning his segment by shouting "Cha'mone mother fucker!", which is a reference to the word "shamone" that Jackson often used in his music, pronouncing most words with an "ay" at the end, and always wearing the trademark rhinestone glove. In series one, his segment was titled "The Jacksons", which featured Michael showing the viewer around his family home, and having an ongoing feud with The Osbournes. In series two, a segment titled "Michael Jackass" was premièred, which showed Jackson doing dangerous tasks such as wakeboarding drunk, diving in an aquarium tank covered in fish, ice skating naked, diving into a pool with his arms and legs tied up, and skydiving. In the third series, Jackson's segment was titled "Doin' Porridge", a parody of the TV series Porridge. The segment followed his nine weeks of being in jail (the real Michael Jackson was due to face trial at the time) with his comedy hero Ronnay Barkay. He also appeared in Bo! in the USA, appearing in a renewed version of "Michael Jackass". The character featured in his own special, Chamone Mo Fo Selecta, following his real-life death in 2009.

=== David Blaine ===
David Blaine is portrayed as a sex-obsessed street magician doubling as a pickup artist. Throughout the first two series, Blaine was featured in a self-titled segment, which saw himself perform tricks against unsuspecting female members of the public. However, during the trick, he is seen groping them for "close contact". In series two, each trick would involve one piece of the woman's underwear being removed from their body and worn by Blaine. After the trick, he tells the person that if they want their underwear back, they would have to "get a room" with him. In one of his magic tricks (referencing his "Frozen in Time" stunt), he masturbates in front of the audience while being encased in ice. He didn't appear in series three or in Bo! in the USA.

=== The Osbournes ===
Many of the Osbourne family are parodied on Bo' Selecta. They have also appeared on the show as themselves, usually while being stalked by Avid. Ozzy is shown to have very long arms, which are constantly moving in front of his body. He is shown to be always mumbling, which makes it impossible to understand what he is saying, apart from the swear bleeps during his sentence. He sometimes shouts "Sharon!" while he is speaking. Sharon is shown to speak in a high-pitched calm voice, quite opposite to what she is like in real life. She is either always sweeping the floor with a brush, or searching for food, a reference to her real life bulimia, though is obsessed with her dogs and often is portrayed as eating their bowel movements. Kelly is the most core character of The Osbournes. She is portrayed as having something of a split personality, moving suddenly from being upbeat and friendly (despite using the word "douchebag" constantly) to loudly swearing and being extremely hostile and violent. This switch in her personality is marked by a shift in accent from a stereotypical "Valley girl" speech pattern to a hard-edged Cockney accent (a parody of Osbourne's real-life Mid-Atlantic accent). Throughout series one, she regularly appeared in "The Week In Bits" segment, often meeting other celebrities or talking about her private life. In series two, she has her own segment, titled "The Kelly Osbourne Show", in which she goes shopping, gets a haircut, slags off other celebrities, or does an advice call-in. Jack was not featured in the first series, though briefly appeared in series two during The Kelly Osbourne Show and once during Craig David's tour, though he was portrayed as a slow moronic child like adult. In series three, his face and hair is drastically increased and he gains a Yorkshire accent in his own show "Jack Off" in which he interviews several people. His catchphrase was "Brown Bread!".

=== The Bear ===
The Bear, played by Leigh Francis with a puppet body, is also one of the main protagonists of the series. During series one, the bear's segment, titled "Showbiz Chat", featured a regular celebrity guest chatting to The Bear, in a location which is only described as "up a tree, on Hampstead Heath". In series two, the segment was upgraded, and titled "Bedtime with the Bear". The segment featured a similar format, with the exception of the ending, in which the guest would read the Bear a bedtime story, which would feature themselves and other celebrities becoming involved in vulgar activities. The stories would always give the Bear an erection, which he would describe as his tail popping out. He has an extreme hatred of Stephen, a ginger squirrel, who he often calls "a nob jockey". In series three, "A Bear's Showbiz Tail" saw The Bear go on location to interview celebrities. When Avid fails to turn up for the last episode of series three, The Bear is given hosting duties, which resulted in his own Christmas special, "A Bear's Christmas Tail", and the entire fourth series being based around his adventures. In Bo' in the USA, he once again had his own segment in which he interviews celebrities. The sketches featured The Bear alongside Verne Troyer, who was shown to be The Bear's agent since his move to America. The Bear later appeared in the 2018 ITV2 series Keith Lemon - Coming in America and in the video for Keith Lemon's all star charity version of "Do They Know It's Christmas" in 2020, with pop stars like Rick Astley, Emma Bunton, Pixie Lott and Matt Goss.

=== Ozzey ===
Ozzey is a recurring character played by Ozzy Rezat. Ozzey was Avid Merrion's landlord. He used to make T-shirts for Avid downstairs, but after Avid got a talk show Ozzey was made part of the wardrobe department. Ozzey was a refugee who escaped to England for an unknown reason. In the first episode of series three he accidentally said it out loud and was told off by Avid. He was also made gay in series three, leading to a sketch where Avid would say television has changed into a 'blank', which would immediately cut to an impersonation of Blankety Blank. All the contestants would be gay celebrities, such as Elton John, Boy George and George Michael. After Bo' Selecta! ended and The Bear got his own show, A Bear's Tail, Ozzey had moved in with Sue Dales and Dave Ian McCall. When Bo' Selecta! returned as a new form, Bo! in the USA, Ozzey was not shown.

== Episodes ==
Nearly all of the episodes of the series have been released on DVD. The six main episodes from series one were released under the banner "Bo' Selecta!: Vol 1". The eight main episodes from series two were released under the banner "Bo' Selecta!: Vol 2". The nine main episodes of series three were released under the banner "Bo' Selecta!: Vol 3". All seven episodes from series four were released under the banner of "A Bear's Tail". All seven episodes from series five were released under the banner of "Bo! in the USA". The two Christmas specials from series two were issued under the banner of "Ho! Ho! Selecta!", "Cha'mone Mo Fo Selecta" was issued under the same title as a separate volume, and "Avid Merrion's Christmas Premiere" was issued on the DVD wingle of his 2004 Christmas single, I Got You Babe / Soda Pop. This leaves only the pilot episode, both parts of "Proper Bo' Selecta!" and "The Bear's Chrimbo Top 20" unreleased.

== Future ==
On 24 September 2009, in an interview with the BBC, Leigh Francis said that Bo' Selecta! might return, claiming he became "excited" whilst making the Michael Jackson tribute episode. Francis admitted on Twitter that plans for the series were on hold, as he was working on a script for a possible movie for another project; however, he has since written on numerous occasions, when asked by other Twitter users about the show, that Bo' Selecta! would not be returning.

In 2019, Mel B and Francis in-character as the Bo' Selecta! version of Mel B did a 90 minute special called 'What a Fookin' Year'.

In March 2024, an attempted revival was scrapped.

== Controversies ==
Speaking to The Sunday Times in 2007, Craig David confessed that "Inside it was absolutely pissing me off and hurtful beyond belief. There were times when I thought, ‘I just want to knock this guy out.’" Although David made an appearance himself in the programme, he regretted it even as he was making it: "I didn’t want people to think, 'Craig’s reacting to it,’ because then they would think, 'How can we get up Craig's nose even more?’ So, I did it, but I wasn't happy about it." However, in 2015, David dismissed his disappointment with his caricature, explaining that his PR team insisted that he "play hurt" and had since "made peace" with Francis. David did say in 2022 that he felt the show "made cheap shots" of various celebrities including David Beckham and that he felt that the rubber mask portrayal of various black celebrities was racist. He also questioned Francis’ apology over the timing in terms of the George Floyd protests in 2020.

Trisha Goddard did not like the way she was portrayed on the show, feeling her portrayal was "racially over the top" and that she would try to avoid Francis at public events, feeling "sick to her stomach". She discussed her children being bullied as a result of the show.

In June 2020, after an agreement between Channel 4 and Francis, the show was taken down from All 4 following backlash over its frequent use of blackface. Francis apologised for playing black celebrities in the show.

== DVD releases ==
DVD release name	DVD extras	Years of series
Bo' Selecta! – The Complete First Series!	Behind the Scenes Featurette, Deleted Scenes, Blooper Reel, Trailers, Photo Gallery, Commentary, and a featurette presented by Kate Thornton, titled "Craig David's Life Story".	2002
Bo' Selecta! – The Complete Second Series!	Behind the Scenes Featurette, Deleted Scenes, Extended Scenes, Blooper Reel, Trailers, Commentary, Photo Gallery, and an uncensored cut of certain scenes, titled "Bo' Sexier!: The XXX Cuts".	2003
Bo' Selecta! – The Complete Third Series!	Commentary, Bo'Hind the Scenes Documentary, Photo Gallery, Deleted Scenes, Blooper Reel, Trailers, and The Best Bits of four characters – Sting, Nadine, Ozzy & Big Brother.	2004
A Bear's Tail – The Complete Series!	Music Video, Conceptual Art, Deleted Scenes, Trailer, Outtakes, Lemony Snippets, Movie Quiz, and a Bear-hind the Scenes documentary. A limited-edition version of the DVD release came in furry bear packaging.	2005
Bo! in the USA - The Complete Series!	The Making of Bo! in the US, Gag Reel, Bo! Interviews, 1984: The Lemon Years, a featurette featuring Keith Lemon, Trailers, Music Video, Commentary and Easter Egg.	2006
