= Merl Lindsay =

Background information
- Born: Merle Lindsay Salathiel; 1916; Oklahoma City, Oklahoma, U.S.
- Died: October 12, 1965 (aged 49) Oklahoma City, Oklahoma, U.S.
- Genres: Western swing
- Occupations: musician, songwriter, bandleader
- Instrument: fiddle
- Years active: 1930s–1960s
- Labels: 4 Star, Bullett, MGM, Mercury

Merle Lindsay Salathiel (1916 – October 12, 1965), better known as Merl Lindsay, was one of the premier American Western swing musicians from the 1930s to the mid-1960s and founder of Merl Lindsay and His Oklahoma Night Riders.

== Life and career ==
Merle Lindsay Salathiel was born in Oklahoma City, Oklahoma to Clarence Earl and Louella Salathiel, early pioneers of the Oklahoma Territory. He began his music career in 1936 playing fiddle in his father (C.E. Salathiel)'s ballroom, Salathiel's Barn. In 1937 he formed his first band, the Barnyard Boys. In 1947, he created a larger band and added a female singer, calling the group Merl Lindsay and His Oklahoma Night Riders. During the 1940s, he owned a ballroom in Compton, California, and broadcast over a four-station radio hookup in Hollywood and Long Beach. He also performed with Jimmy Wakely in Western B-movies.

In 1957, Lindsay joined ABC-TV's Ozark Jubilee, taking over the ten-piece Ozark Jubilee Band. His group adopted the name when the TV program's title was changed to Country Music Jubilee the next year. During later years he toured the US and performed at his ballroom, Lindsayland, in Oklahoma City.

Many famous Western swing musicians performed with Lindsay's bands over the years. Two of his female singers were Wanda Jackson and Norma Jean. His brother, Doyle Salathiel (1920–1976), played with Lindsay's bands as well as others, and was a composer who wrote the words for the band's signature song, "Water Baby Blues". Lindsay's nephew, Max Salathiel (1935–2006), an accomplished Oklahoma City guitar player, also worked with his band in the 1950s, as did his sister Alojah Salathiel.

Other band members included Robert "Buddy" Ray, Rudy Martin, Frederick "Freddie" Loveland, Louvenie Loveland, Ted Haff, Mike Hugo, Clarence Bailey, Homer Bean, Gerald "Buster" Magness, Gene Jones (steel guitar) and Sonny Rogers.

Lindsay was married to Doris Salathiel. He had three children, Merlynn Salathiel, Denzel Salathiel (1952-2016) and Jackie Merle Phillips (1934-2000). Lindsay died in Oklahoma City from cancer on October 12, 1965. He is buried in Sunnylane Cemetery in Del City, Oklahoma.

== Compositions ==
Lindsay wrote many songs that became hits for himself and other Western swing artists. Among them:

- "Lonesome Okie Goin' Home"
- "Shimmy Shakin' Daddy"
- "Slidin' Steel" (with Gene Crownover)
- "Water Baby Blues/Water Baby Boogie"
