= The Maddox Brothers and Rose – Vol. 1 =

The Maddox Brothers & Rose - Vol. 1

Compilation album by Maddox Brothers and Rose
- Released: 1976, 1993
- Recorded: February 19, 1940, December 29, 1945, 1951
- Genre: Western Swing
- Length: 1:09:10
- Label: Arhoolie
- Producer: Chris Strachwitz

Professional ratings
Review scores
Source	Rating
Allmusic	5/5 stars

The Maddox Brothers and Rose – Vol. 1; America's Most Colorful Hillbilly Band, Their Original Recordings 1946-1951 is a re-issue of recordings by Maddox Brothers and Rose during the years 1946 through 1951.

== Track listing ==
1. "George's Playhouse Boogie" – 2:45
2. "Midnight Train" – 3:05
3. "Shimmy Shakin' Daddy" – 2:11
4. "Careless Driver" – 2:49
5. "Move It On Over" (Hank Williams) – 2:46
6. "Whoa Sailor" (Hank Thompson) – 2:36
7. "Milk Cow Blues" (Kokomo Arnold) – 3:10
8. "Mean and Wicked Boogie" – 2:39
9. "Brown Eyes" (A.P. Carter) – 2:58
10. "Honky Tonkin'" (Hank Williams) – 2:27
11. "Time Nor Tide" – 3:02
12. "New Mule Skinner Blues"† (George Vaughn, Jimmie Rodgers) – 2:10
13. "Philadelphia Lawyer" (Woody Guthrie) – 3:15
14. "Sally Let Your Bangs Hang Down" – 2:18
15. "When I Lay My Burden Down" – 2:16
16. "Hangover Blues" – 2:37
17. "Water Baby Boogie" – 2:09
18. "Dark as a Dungeon" – 2:23
19. "Mule Train" – 2:56
20. "Oklahoma Sweetheart Sally Ann" – 2:15
21. "Faded Love" – 2:41
22. "New Step It Up and Go" – 2:28
23. "(Pay Me) Alimony" – 2:12
24. "I Wish I Was a Single Girl Again" – 2:13
25. "Your Love Light Never Shone" – 2:02
26. "Meanest Man in Town" – 2:33
27. "I Want to Live and Love" – 2:05

† Track 12 is actually "I Want to Live and Love", although a different version than track 27.

== Personnel ==
- Rose Maddox - vocals
- Gene Breeden, Jimmy Winkle, Ray Nichols - lead guitar
- Henry Maddox - mandolin, lead guitar (after 1949)
- Cal Maddox - rhythm guitar, harmonica, vocals
- Fred Maddox - bass
- Don Maddox - fiddle
- Cliff Maddox - mandolin (until 1949)
- Bud Maddox - steel guitar
- Fred Maddox - lead vocals on "Mean and Wicked Boogie" and "Gonna Lay My Burden Down"
