= List of Bo' Selecta! episodes =

The following is a comprehensive list of the episodes from Channel 4 impressions series Bo' Selecta!.

== Episode list ==
=== Series 1 (2002) ===
No. in season	Title	Directed by	Written by	UK viewers (millions)	Original release date
0	"Pilot"	N/A	N/A	TBA	Unaired
Avid Merrion gives the viewers a tour of his studio flat, before setting out to track down his first crush, Davina McCall.
1	"Avid Loves... Davina"	Ben Palmer	Leigh Francis & Spencer Millman	TBA	6 September 2002
Avid Merrion gives a tour around his studio flat, where his dead mother, Angelika, is in a wardrobe and Craig Phillips is chained up in a cupboard. Michael Jackson introduces his family. The Bear interviews Liberty X in his treehouse on Hampstead Heath. Mel B advertises her new book. Craig David provides an insight into 7 days of his life. David Blaine performs street magic for some lucky shoppers. Avid harasses Jade Goody in the street, then interviews Davina McCall.
2	"Avid Surprises... Penny"	Ben Palmer	Leigh Francis & Spencer Millman	TBA	13 September 2002
Britney Spears tells us what she does on her day off. Enrique Iglesias berates Gareth Gates for his drunken behaviour. The Bear interviews Tess Daly. Michael Jackson and his assistant Bubbles (Caroline Flack) compete in blind boxing. Elton John learns to use the internet. Craig David takes on the world of medieval jousting. David Blaine helps a woman overcome her fear of chickens. Avid surprises Penny Smith in her dressing room on the set of GMTV.
3	"Avid Stalks... Michael"	Ben Palmer	Leigh Francis & Spencer Millman	TBA	20 September 2002
John Lennon comes back to life and visits his widow Yoko Ono. The Bear interviews Terri Dwyer. Michael Jackson goes ice skating naked with chickens instead of skates. Avid meets Michael Ball in HMV to get his autograph and invites Vanessa Feltz to his flat for his mother's birthday party. Craig David visits the Hawk Conservancy Trust.
4	"Michael Jackson's Family Tree"	Ben Palmer	Leigh Francis & Spencer Millman	TBA	27 September 2002
Michael Jackson introduces Janet Jackson for the first time; he tells The Osbournes to tone down their swearing. The Bear interviews Christine Hamilton. Avid's odd neighbour Ozzey discovers that he is keeping Craig Phillips hostage. Avid tries to meet Geri Halliwell at a book signing but is ejected but security guards. Craig David wants to break America, but mistakenly flies to Majorca instead. Avid meets Keith Duffy in a pub. David Blaine performs a trick in the street. Will Young is interviewed by a computer for Celebrity Test.
5	"Avid Oozes Over... The Hollyoaks Babes"	Ben Palmer	Leigh Francis & Spencer Millman	TBA	4 October 2002
Destiny's Child go to a beauty salon in Bradford on their day off, where Beyoncé angrily criticises her bandmates. Michael Jackson dives with a chain around him, and has oranges hit at him by Bubbles. The Bear interviews Sarah Cawood. Avid meets Ethan Hawke at a book signing at HMV and sneaks into the British Soap Awards, where he meets several cast members, kissing a few of them. Craig David is expecting to film a music video, but it is cancelled.
6	"Craig David's Homecoming"	Ben Palmer	Leigh Francis & Spencer Millman	TBA	11 October 2002
David Blaine tries to stay in a suspended ice block for a week; while Craig David comes home to Leeds and introduces his friends and family.
7	"Proper Bo' Selecta - Part One"	Ben Palmer	Leigh Francis & Spencer Millman	TBA	28 February 2003
Highlights from the first series, as well as new footage and sketches, including Martin Bashir interviewing Michael Jackson.
8	"Proper Bo' Selecta - Part Two"	Ben Palmer	Leigh Francis & Spencer Millman	TBA	7 March 2003
More highlights, new footage and sketches from the first series.

=== Series 2 (2003) ===
No. in season	Title	Directed by	Written by	UK viewers (millions)	Original release date
1	"Avid's Back... Back Again"	Ben Palmer	Leigh Francis	TBA	6 June 2003
Jade Goody gives birth to a new baby; Craig David begins a sold-out tour; Katie Price airs an argument between members of The Spice Girls and Girls Aloud; Michael Jackson offers P. Diddy the chance to duet with him; Avid attends a celebrity football game where he meets Rod Stewart, and Gareth Gates has a weird encounter with Justin Hawkins.
2	"Avid Makes Love to... t.A.T.u."	Ben Palmer	Leigh Francis	TBA	13 June 2003
David Beckham joins the Disney Club; Craig David runs into Michael Jackson and Martin Bashir on his world tour; Katie Price expresses upset over One True Voice's split; The Bear interviews Jennifer Ellison; Ricky Gervais surprises shoppers with an outbreak of dancing; Dale Winton goes live on GMTV; and Avid comes face to face with t.A.T.u. at an HMV signing.
3	"Avid Dreams of... Mis-Teeq"	Ben Palmer	Leigh Francis	TBA	20 June 2003
Avid is arrested for stalking Vanessa Feltz; Craig David goes on a promotional tour for his new single; David Beckham learns how to ride a bike; Michael Jackson tries out some new international cuisine; The Bear interviews Kerry Katona; Ant & Dec find out what their latest task on Saturday Night Takeaway is; and Avid has dreams of meeting Mis-Teeq.
4	"Avid Meets... Westlife"	Ben Palmer	Leigh Francis	TBA	27 June 2003
Avid's dream of meeting his heroes, Westlife, finally comes true; Keane surprises Avid with a visit; and Trisha Goddard helps out a group of motorists in distress.
5	"Avid Goes to the... Movies"	Ben Palmer	Leigh Francis	TBA	4 July 2003
The Bear interviews Edith Bowman; Avid attends the movie premiere of Charlie's Angels: Full Throttle, former Take That member Mark Owen makes an unexpected appearance and Avid has sex with a plastic model of Kim Cattrall and other members of Sex and the City.
6	"Avid vs..... Meatloaf"	Ben Palmer	Leigh Francis	TBA	11 July 2003
The bear interviews Vernon Kay; Avid goes behind-the-scenes at Party in the Park; Meat Loaf challenges Avid to a sing-off; and Kylie Minogue finds herself caught in a bidding war for her old underwear.
7	"Avid on the... Radio"	Ben Palmer	Leigh Francis	TBA	18 July 2003
The Bear interviews Davina McCall and Dermot O'Leary on the set of Big Brother; Michael Jackson scatters Barry White's ashes; Mel B gives a guided tour of her house; and Avid finally comes face-to-face with Chris Moyles.
8	"Craig David's Doppelganger"	Ben Palmer	Leigh Francis	TBA	25 July 2003
Craig David discovers he has a doppelganger; David Sneddon gives his first live performance since Fame Academy; and Richard Madeley reveals details of his first encounter with Judy Finnigan, and how her ample assets have made his life brighter.

=== Christmas Specials (2003) ===
No. in season	Title	Directed by	Written by	UK viewers (millions)	Original release date
1	"Proper Crimbo!"	Ben Palmer	Leigh Francis	TBA	21 November 2003
Avid reveals that he has recorded a single to compete in the Christmas charts, entitled "Proper Crimbo", and takes us behind the scenes of the music video, with stars including Matthew Wright, John Leslie, Bob Geldof, Dermot O'Leary, Jade Goody and Sting.
2	"Ho, Ho, Ho, Selecta!"	Ben Palmer	Leigh Francis	2.61m	23 December 2003
Craig David visits Santa Claus' grotto; Michael Jackson teaches Mel B the art of carol singing; Elton John delivers an alternative Queen's speech; and a number of famous faces join together for a choir recital.

=== Series 3 (2004) ===
No. in season	Title	Directed by	Written by	UK viewers (millions)	Original release date
1	"Avid and the... Spice Girl"	Ben Palmer	Leigh Francis & Kate Daughton	2.82m	18 June 2004
Avid gives a tour of his new chat show set and the people who work there, and he also interviews Emma Bunton; Paul McKenna is interviewed by The Bear; Mel B and Patsy Kensit share a house in a spoof of The Odd Couple, and Craig David starts filming his new video diary.
2	"Avid and the... Australian"	Ben Palmer	Leigh Francis & Kate Daughton	2.42m	25 June 2004
Michael Jackson starts a protest on the prison roof in Doin' Porridge; in The Odd Couple, Mel B annoys Patsy Kensit in the bathroom; The Bear goes to the pub with Bob Mortimer; and Avid interviews Peter Andre.
3	"Avid Learns How to... Be Cool"	Ben Palmer	Leigh Francis & James Le Frond	2.66m	2 July 2004
Avid tries to entertain Jack Osbourne with an afternoon in the Jacuzzi; and Keith Lemon has a proposition for Avid.
4	"Avid Falls in Love with... Nadine"	Ben Palmer	Leigh Francis & James Le Frond	2.52m	9 July 2004
The Bear becomes an agony aunt with Phillip Schofield and Fern Britton on the This Morning set. Nick Cotton and Kat Slater argue in the laundrette in Eastendings; Craig David has trouble with his PR Manager; in The Odd Couple, Mel B and Patsy Kensit talk about the size of their breasts; and Nadine gives a live performance of her new single.
5	"Avid Becomes Obsessive with... Nadine"	Ben Palmer	Leigh Francis & James Le Frond	2.50m	16 July 2004
Avid interviews Sean Pertwee on his talk show set; The Bear goes camping with Lisa Stansfield in The Bear's Showbiz Tail, and Nadine returns to the studio to perform "No Limit".
6	"Avid and the... Coronation Street Threesome"	Ben Palmer	Leigh Francis & James Le Frond	2.55m	23 July 2004
In Doin' Porridge, Michael Jackson has some recreation time in the prison yard; The Bear and Jonathan Ross rehearse for "Bear: The Movie"; Avid meets Suranne Jones and Samia Ghadie on the set of Coronation Street; Craig David edits his new video for "Soda Pop" in the new segment of his video diary, and Mel B looks after Patsy Kensit when she is ill in The Odd Couple.
7	"Avid and the Trouble with... The Osbournes"	Ben Palmer	Leigh Francis & Kate Daughton	2.53m	30 July 2004
Avid interviews Sharon and Ozzy Osbourne about their daughter, Kelly; in Eastendings, Kat Slater has a run in with Sonia's Dad, and the show then experiences technical difficulties caused by The Bear; Craig David throws a party for his single "Soda Pop"; it's Psychotherapy Day for Michael Jackson in Doin' Porridge; and in The Odd Couple, Patsy Kensit and Mel B exercise to a workout video.
8	"That One With Lots of Guests"	Ben Palmer	Leigh Francis & James Le Frond	2.39m	6 August 2004
Avid interviews a number of celebrity guests, including Myleene Klass, Vernon Kay, Dermot O'Leary and Craig Phillips.
9	"The Bear Takes Over"	Ben Palmer	Leigh Francis & Kate Daughton	1.45m	13 August 2004
The Bear takes over as host, and starts a band with James Bourne and Charlie Simpson from Busted; Craig David "Checks It Out" with Derek Acorah, searching for ghosts in a haunted mansion; Kat Slater has an argument in the garage in Eastendings; while Patsy Kensit gets drunk and thinks she has feelings for Mel B in The Odd Couple.

=== Christmas Specials (2004) ===
No. in season	Title	Directed by	Written by	UK viewers (millions)	Original release date
1	"Avid Merrion's Christmas Premiere"	Ben Palmer	Leigh Francis & Kate Daughton	TBA	16 November 2004
Avid takes us behind the scenes at the recording of his second Christmas single I Got You Babe, on which he duets with Davina McCall and Patsy Kensit. Craig David also premieres the video for his new single, "Soda Pop".
2	"A Bear's Christmas Tail"	Ben Palmer	Leigh Francis, James Le Frond & Kate Daughton	TBA	21 December 2004
The Bear decides to move out of his treehouse and find himself a family... but not quite everything goes to plan.

=== Series 4: A Bear's Tail (2005) ===
A Bear's Tail forms part of the Bo' Selecta narrative and is therefore considered the next series in the timeline.

No. in season	Title	Directed by	Written by	UK viewers (millions)	Original release date
1	"The Good, The Bear & The Ugly"	Ben Palmer	Ben Palmer & James Le Frond	1.95m	8 July 2005
The Bear realises that he may have finally found his new home.
2	"Adventures in Bear-by-sitting"	Ben Palmer	Ben Palmer & James Le Frond	2.00m	15 July 2005
Now settled into his new environment and role as a sitcom star, The Bear learns to share his screen time with other actors.
3	"The Son of Bear-elzebub"	Ben Palmer	Ben Palmer & James Le Frond	1.66m	22 July 2005
Things between The Bear and Richard start to go down-hill, so in an attempt to repair their relationship, they attend a father and son counselling session.
4	"Meet The Bearents"	Ben Palmer	Ben Palmer & James Le Frond	Under 1.75m	29 July 2005
The Bear meets his real biological parents.
5	"Blame it on the Bearboy"	Ben Palmer	Ben Palmer & James Le Frond	Under 1.56m	5 August 2005
After overhearing a conversation between The Bear and Stephen the Squirrel, Richard learns that Helena is not really pregnant.
6	"Two Weddings, A Bear & No Funeral"	Ben Palmer	Ben Palmer & James Le Frond	1.74m	12 August 2005
While Helena and Richard celebrate their last night of freedom, Bear is sent to stay with cousin Kelly Osbourne. Helena and Richard get married at the same time as Dave and Sue. As the wedding takes place, even Bear can't hide his joy and makes up with sister Lilian after treating her like a supporting actress.

=== Christmas Special (2005) ===
No. in season	Title	Directed by	Written by	UK viewers (millions)	Original release date
1	"Avid Merrion: American Sicko"	Unknown	Unknown	TBA	24 December 2005
Avid Merrion decides to up-sticks with some of his celebrity friends and start a new life in America.

=== Series 5: Bo! in the USA (2006) ===
No. in season	Title	Directed by	Written by	UK viewers (millions)	Original release date
1	"Avid in the U.S.A."	Ben Palmer	Leigh Francis & Ben Palmer	TBA	13 October 2006
Avid and his wife Sacha talk about their move to L.A., and the celebrities who stay at their new hotel. Meanwhile, in the Michael Jackson Show, Michael pimps a bride.
2	"Avid Hangs Out With... Justin Timberlake"	Ben Palmer	Leigh Francis & Ben Palmer	TBA	20 October 2006
Avid meets Justin Timberlake, while wolf-boy Ralph talks to Carlito about what it would be like to be with a woman like Sacha.
3	"The Bear and the Supermodel"	Ben Palmer	Leigh Francis & Ben Palmer	TBA	27 October 2006
The Bear meets Victoria Silvstedt, and Sacha starts having an affair with Ralph the wolf-boy.
4	"Chris Martin's Donuts"	Ben Palmer	Leigh Francis & Ben Palmer	TBA	3 November 2006
Avid catches Sacha kissing Ralph, whilst she's seeing Steve Guttenberg. Chris Martin has fun shopping for donuts.
5	"Avid and the... Movie Star"	Ben Palmer	Leigh Francis & Ben Palmer	TBA	10 November 2006
Carlito tries to tell Ralph that wolf boys can't have relationships with humans after he becomes upset over losing Sacha. Avid and Sacha meet Dean Cain.
6	"Pete Docherty's Addiction"	Ben Palmer	Leigh Francis & Ben Palmer	TBA	17 November 2006
Krishnan Guru-Murphy reports on Pete Docherty's latest addiction - peas. Plus The Bear finally gets a gig, presenting a chat show.

=== Special (2009) ===
No. in season	Title	Directed by	Written by	UK viewers (millions)	Original release date
1	"Cha'mone Mo'Fo'Selecta! A Tribute to Michael Jackson"	James Le Frond	Leigh Francis & James Le Frond	TBA	24 September 2009
Michael Jackson introduces a documentary about his life, after his death earlier in the year, with contributions from Emma Bunton, David Gest, Paddy McGuinness and Peaches Geldof. This episode was dedicated to the memory of Michael Jackson.
2	"The Bear's Proper Chrimbo!"	James Le Frond	Leigh Francis & James Le Frond	TBA	18 December 2009
The Bear counts down his top twenty all-time favourite Christmas-related music videos, including both of Avid Merrion's Christmas-related singles – "Proper Crimbo" and "I Got You Babe".
