= Fifty Grand for Christmas =

Song by Paul Holt
- A-side: "Fifty Grand for Christmas"
- Recorded: 2004
- Genre: Glam rock, Christmas
- Label: Sanctuary Records
- Songwriter(s): Stewart James, Bradley James

"Fifty Grand for Christmas" or "50K for Christmas" is a holiday single by Paul Holt. It was released by Sanctuary Records on December 6, 2004. The song was written by Bradley and Stewart James, who also penned Nick Berry's #1 single "Every Loser Wins". The lyrics revolve around a bet that Simon Cowell made with auditionee Paul Holt during auditions for The X Factor, that he would pay him £50,000 if he got a #1 single. Holt was quickly signed by a record label - and backed by X Factor judge Sharon Osbourne - to release "Fifty Grand for Christmas", which only charted at #35 in the UK. The song was a pastiche of Roy Wood's style, though Holt's singing voice is similar to that of Gary Puckett.
