= I Got You Babe / Soda Pop =

Single by Bo' Selecta!
- Released: 13 December 2004
- Genre: Comedy, pop
- Length: 4:15 (I Got You Babe); 3:05 (Soda Pop)
- Songwriter(s): Sonny Bono, Cher, Leigh Francis
- Producer(s): Bo' Selecta

Bo' Selecta! singles chronology
"Proper Crimbo" (2003)	"I Got You Babe / Soda Pop" (2004)

"I Got You Babe / Soda Pop" is a double A-side Christmas release by the cast of the comedy programme, Bo' Selecta, in which Leigh Francis performs as Craig David and Avid Merrion. "I Got You Babe" is a cover of the Sonny & Cher, and features Merrion, Davina McCall and Patsy Kensit performing. "Soda Pop" is a mock single 'recorded' by Craig David. The single was released in December 2004, peaking at #5 on the UK Singles Chart.

== Track listing ==
CD single
No.	Title	Length
1.	"I Got You Babe"	4:15
2.	"Soda Pop"	3:05

DVD single
No.	Title	Length
1.	"I Got You Babe" (Full Length Video)	8:14
2.	"Soda Pop" (Video)	3:45
3.	"I Got You Babe" (Making of the Video)	12:58
4.	"I Got You Babe" (Audio)	4:15
5.	"Soda Pop" (Audio)	3:05

12" picture disc
No.	Title	Length
1.	"I Got You Babe"	4:15
2.	"Soda Pop" (12" Version)	4:18

== Charts ==
Chart (2004)	Peak position
UK Singles (OCC)	5
