= Craig Phillips =

English television personality and builder

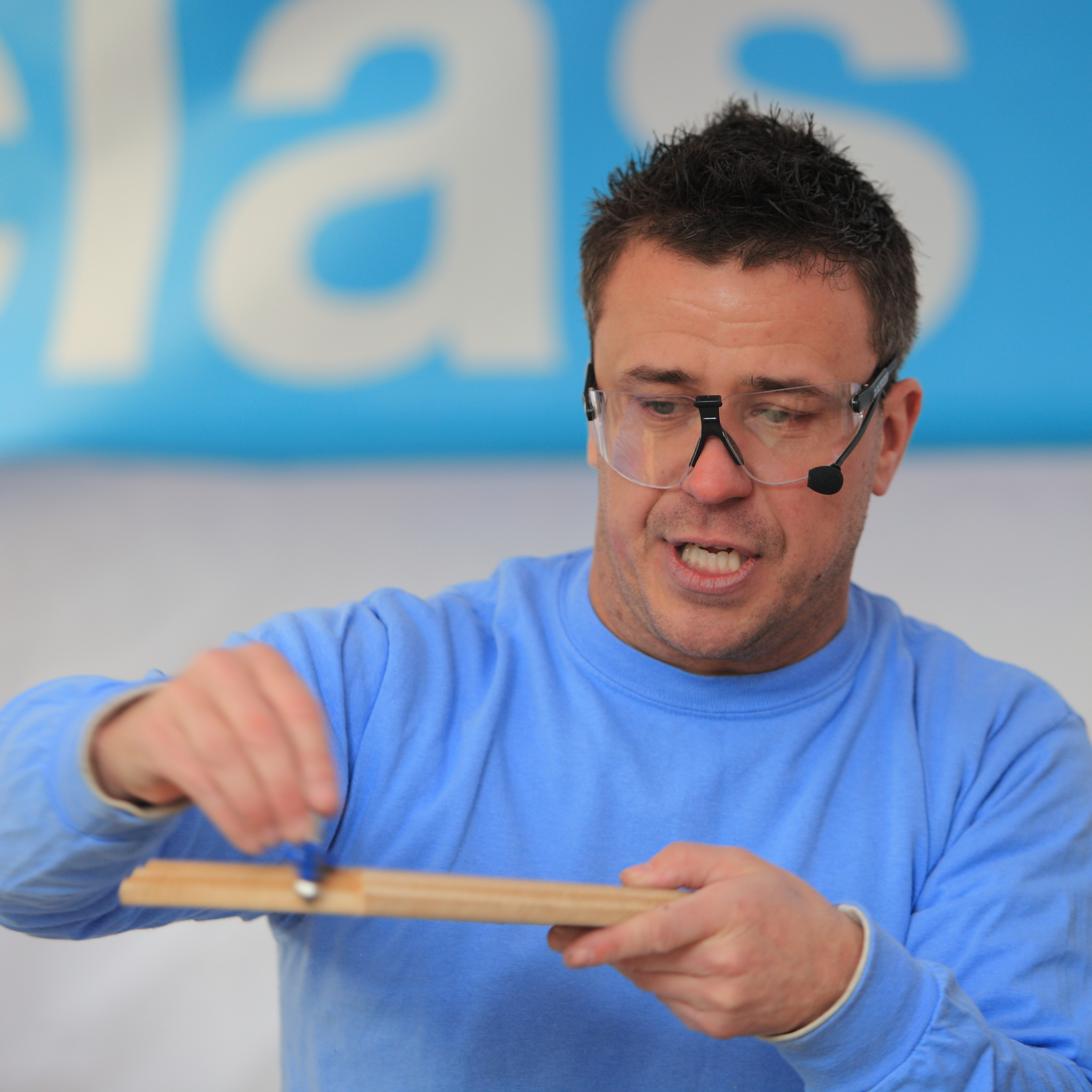
- Phillips in 2011
- Born: 16 October 1971 (age 54); Liverpool, England
- Years active: 2000–present
- Television: Big Brother 1
- Spouse: Laura Sherriff (m. 2018)
- Children: 2

Craig Phillips (born 16 October 1971) is an English television personality and builder. He won the first series of Big Brother in 2000. He is trained as a bricklayer, and has appeared in numerous television series related to building since winning Big Brother.

== Early life ==
The younger of two children and born in Liverpool, his family moved to Newport, Shropshire, in the late 1980s. At 18, Phillips secured a day release bricklayers apprenticeship whilst employed with Wrekin Council's construction department. He also attended further night school classes in advanced brickwork and civil engineering. Having qualified with a City & Guilds, Phillips went on to set up his own building company. In the 1990s, he presented Renovation Street with Linda Robson for Carlton ITV before being brought in as the DIY expert for the BBC on an exclusive contract in 2001.

== Career after Big Brother ==
After leaving Big Brother as the first winner, Phillips gave his £70,000 prize to his friend Joanne Harris, who had Down syndrome, to pay for her heart and lung transplant. He had begun raising money with friends for Harris sometime before entering Big Brother, raising only small amounts of money towards the £250,000 needed for her operation, but within six days of winning, he achieved the target required for her life-saving operation thanks to public support and donations from celebrities. Harris died in April 2008. He has featured in comedy series Bo' Selecta! and appeared in the reality series Back to Reality, raising £40,000 for Macmillan Cancer Trust.

At Christmas 2000, Phillips released the charity single, "At This Time of Year" through Warner Music. The single went to Number 14 in the UK Singles Chart, achieving silver disc status, and raising over £40,000 for the Down's Syndrome Association. It stayed in the top 40 for three weeks. Since then, he appeared in videos for two other Xmas singles – Bo Selecta!'s Proper Crimbo which reached No. 4 in 2003 and Ricky Tomlinson's "Christmas My A*se" which reached 25 in 2006. In 2001, Phillips appeared on Lily Savage's Blankety Blank; in 2003, Phillips appeared on the fifth series of Fort Boyard.

Phillips has presented numerous televisions programmes, including Housecall, Housecall in the Country, Builders Sweat and Tears, Our House, Trading Up, Big Strong Boys, Boyz in the Wood, Big Strong Boys in the Sun, Renovation Street, Trading Up in the Sun, House Trap and Craig’s Trade Tips. He also has a production company called Avent Productions. For Avent, he has presented Conversion; a 10-part series for Discovery Realtime, and the sixth series of Hung, Drawn & Broke, a 6-part series filmed for British Forces Broadcasting Service. The company also produces corporate productions many of these for building companies. In 2007, Phillips joined the team of 60 Minute Makeover for ITV. He appeared in 80 episodes in 2008.

In February 2009, Phillips appeared in Ant & Dec's Saturday Night Takeaway in "Escape from Takeaway Prison" for six weeks. In summer 2009, he released his debut autobiography. In July 2009, Phillips returned to the Big Brother house to help celebrate the show's tenth anniversary. In 2010, Phillips appeared on Big Brother again, and competed in a shed building task. He also appeared in Dermot's Last Supper, a special to celebrate the ending of Big Brother. In April 2011, he hosted a show called Celebrity DIY with Craig Phillips for Home. In June 2011, he also hosted If It's Broke, Fix It for Home.

In June 2020, he made a guest appearance on Big Brothers's Best Shows on E4, where he talked about watching his series back.

Since 2018, Phillips has run his own YouTube channel, Mr and Mrs DIY, providing tutorials on home and garden maintenance jobs.

== Filmography ==
Year	Title	Role	Notes
2000	Big Brother UK series 1	Self; housemate	Winner, 52 episodes
2000	TFI Friday	Self; guest presenter	1 episode
2000	TV Revealed	Self; guest	1 episode
2000	Live Talk	Self; guest	1 episode
2000	Live & Kicking	Self; guest	1 episode
2001	Housecall	Self; guest	1 episode
2001	An Audience with Des O'Connor	Self; audience member	TV special
2001	Blankety Blank	Self; contestant	1 episode
2001	The Generation Game	Self; contestant	1 episode
2001	Children in Need 2001	Self	TV special
2001	Night Fever	Self; guest	1 episode
2002	Kelly	Self; guest	1 episode
2002	Bo' Selecta!	Craig	10 episodes
2003	Big Strong Boys	Big Strong Boy	1 episode
2003	Ho Ho Ho Selecta!	Craig	TV film
2004	Back to Reality	Self; contestant	3rd place, 15 episodes
2004	Builders, Sweat & Tears	Self; cast member	15 episodes
2004	A Bear's Christmas Tail	Cameo	
2005	Big Brother's Most Outrageous Moments	Self; guest	TV special
2006	Hung, Drawn and Quartered	Self; presenter	6 episodes
2007	The Charlotte Church Show	Self; guest	1 episode
2008	50 Greatest Comedy Catchphrases	Self	TV special
2008	Breakfast	Self; guest	1 episode
2008	TV's Funniest Music Moments	Self	TV special
2008	The Comedy Map of Britain	Self	Documentary
2009	Ant & Dec's Saturday Night Takeaway	Self; guest	5 episodes
2009	Big Brother's Big Quiz	Self; former housemate	TV special
2009	Daily Cooks Challenge	Self; guest	1 episode
2009	Celebrity Shock List 2009	Self	TV special
2009–2010	Loose Women	Self; guest	2 episodes
2010	Big Brother's Little Brother	Self; former housemate	1 episode
2010	Big Brother's Big Awards Show	Self; former housemate	TV special
2010	The 5 O'Clock Show	Self; guest	1 episode
2010	The Wright Stuff	Self; guest panelist	1 episode
2010	The Michael Ball Show	Self; guest	1 episode
2010	Ultimate Big Brother	Self; former housemate	3 episodes
2010	Dear Mr Hicks	Cameo	Uncredited
2010	Celebrity Eggheads	Self; contestant	1 episode
2010	Reeling in the Years	Self; guest	1 episode
2011	If It's Broke, Fix It!	Self; guest	1 episode
2011	The Gadget Show	Self; guest	1 episode
2011	Britain's Favourite Christmas Songs	Bo' Selecta! co-star	TV special
2011	Celebrity DIY with Craig Phillips	Self; presenter	15 episodes
2012	Daybreak	Self; guest	1 episode
2012	Big Brother's Bit on the Side	Self; former housemate	4 episodes
2012	Keith Lemon: The Film	Craig Phillips	
2013	60 Minute Makeover	Self; guest	1 episode
2014	Celebrity Juice	Self; guest	1 episode
2014	TV's Nastiest Villains	Self	TV special
2014	Most Shocking TV Moments	Self; Big Brother series 1 winner	TV special
2015	Pointless Celebrities	Self; contestant	1 episode
2016	Shaun's People	Self; guest	1 episode
2017	When Celebrity Goes Horribly Wrong	Self	TV special
2017	When Reality TV Goes Horribly Wrong	Self; presenter	TV special
2018	The Story of Reality TV	Self; Big Brother series 1 winner	TV special
2018	Stand Up to Cancer	Self	TV special
2018	Lorraine	Self; guest	3 episodes
2019	This Morning	Self; guest	1 episode
2020	Joe Lycett's Got Your Back	Self; guest	1 episode
2020	Top 10 Ways to Add 20K to Your Home	Self; presenter	TV special
2023	Robin Elliott Tonight	Self; guest	1 episode

== Personal life ==
In 2018, Phillips married Laura Sherriff at Peckforton Castle, Cheshire, after the couple had dated for two years. Rather than asking for gifts from guests, he and Sherriff asked that the attendants donate to hospice charities instead. The couple have two children: Nelly (born March 2019), and Lennon (born December 2020). The couple featured in Channel 5's (S1 Ep1) "Millionaire Age Gap Love" in 2020.
