= Hot Pantz =

UK female vocal duo

Hot Pantz are a UK female vocal duo, formed by Kelly Hampson and Shelley Mintrim. They released the single, "Give U One 4 Christmas" in 2004, which despite radio airplay failed to reach the Top 40 in the UK Singles Chart, peaking at #64.
