= Water Baby Blues =

Single by Merl Lindsay and His Oklahoma Nightriders
- Recorded: 1946
- Genre: Western swing
- Label: 4 Star
- Songwriter: Merl Lindsay

"Water Baby Blues"/"Water Baby Boogie" is a Western swing instrumental first recorded in 1946 by Merl Lindsay (4 Star 1117) and which became his signature song. Often recorded as "Water Baby Boogie" it became a popular dance tune.

Doyle Salathiel, Lindsay's brother and jazz guitarist who sometime played with the band, wrote a set of novelty lyrics for the tune. Called "Singing Water Baby Blues" (Mercury 70119, 1952) it has such lyrics as:

Some are red and some are green,
But not the one that I have seen.
The one I saw was colored blue.
Supposed to bring good luck to you.

== Other renditions ==
Other artists with recordings of "Water Baby Blues"/"Water Baby Boogie" include:

- Maddox Brothers and Rose, 4 Star 1507 (1950)
- Hank Thompson and the Brazos Valley Boys
- Eddie Cochran on the album Rockin' It Country Style (released 1997, recorded 1953/54)

== Bibliography ==
- Coffey, Kevin. Merl Lindsay and his Oklahoma Nite Riders (Krazy Kat KKCD 33, 2005) insert.
