= Maddox Brothers and Rose =

American country music group

The Maddox Brothers and Rose
- Origin: Boaz, Alabama, U.S.
- Genres: Country, Western swing, Old-time, gospel
- Years active: 1937–1956
- Label: 4 Star Records, Columbia Records, Decca Records, King Records
- Members: Rose Maddox; Fred Maddox; Cal Maddox; Henry Maddox; Don Maddox
- Past members: Cliff Maddox

The Maddox Brothers and Rose were an American country music group active from the 1930s to 1950s, consisting of four brothers, Fred, Cal, Cliff, and Don Maddox, along with their sister Rose; Cliff died in 1949 and was replaced by brother Henry. Originating in Alabama, but gaining success after the Maddox family moved to California during the Great Depression, the group were among the earliest "hillbilly music" stars to emerge from the West Coast. The group disbanded in 1956, with Rose Maddox embarking on a solo career.

== Biography ==
The family was from Boaz, Alabama but rode the rails and hitchhiked to California in 1933 when the band members were children, after the failed efforts of their sharecropper parents during the early part of the Great Depression. They were slightly in advance of the flood of Okies who flooded California in the 1930s. They struggled to make a living as itinerant fruit and vegetable pickers, following the harvest as far north as Washington and to Arizona in the east as well as the San Joaquin Valley. They often worked from dawn to dusk, sleeping and eating on the ground.

Settling in Modesto, California, the family developed musical ability and in 1937, performed on the radio, sponsored by a local furniture store. In 1939, they entered a hillbilly band competition at the centennial Sacramento State Fair in Sacramento. They sang "Sally Let Your Bangs Hang Down".

The brothers and Rose appeared at 97th Street Corral in Los Angeles. From 1946 to 1951, the group recorded for 4 Star Records and then Columbia Records. Some 4 Star masters were leased and released by the U.S. part of Decca Records at the beginning of the 1950s. Rose Maddox said, "We were called hillbilly singers–not country–then. No, none of this country music then. People just called us hillbilly... People tell me that I was one of the first women to sing what I sang–country boogie. I guess I was. There was no rock 'n' roll in those early days, before 1955. Only country boogie. My brothers also played that way. We called it country then."

Fred Maddox played upright bass using the "slap bass" technique as early as 1937. His bass is displayed at the Experience Music Project in Seattle. "They wanted his bass because they believe he might have hit the first note of rock 'n' roll on it." Don Maddox was the last surviving member of the band and lived in Ashland, Oregon. He experienced a career resurgence 50 years after having success with Maddox Bros and Rose. He played at the Britt Festival in Jacksonville, Oregon, opening for Big & Rich, performing at the Muddy Roots festival in Cookeville, Tennessee in 2011 and 2012, playing on the Marty Stuart show, and he received a standing ovation show at the Grand Ole Opry in Nashville. He also performed in Las Vegas at the first annual Rockabilly Rockout at the Gold Coast Casino on October 5, 2014. Don Maddox died on September 12, 2021, at the age of 98. Bud Duncan died on June 13, 2026, at the age of 98.

== Band members ==
- Cliff Maddox (born May 19, 1912, Boaz, Alabama and died August 8, 1949 in Modesto, California)
- Cal Maddox (born November 3, 1915, Boaz and died July 2, 1968 in Jackson County, Oregon)
- Fred Maddox (born July 3, 1919, Boaz and died October 29, 1992, Kern, California now East Bakersfield)
- Don Maddox (born December 7, 1922, Boaz and died September 12, 2021)
- Rose Maddox (born August 15, 1925, Boaz and died April 15, 1998 in Ashland, Oregon)
- Henry Maddox (born March 19, 1928, Boaz and died June 11, 1974 in Ashland)
- Bud Duncan (born March 18, 1928, Pollard, Arkansas and died June 13, 2026)

== Discography ==
- A Collection of Standard Sacred Songs (King Records, 1959)
- Maddox Bros. and Rose (King, 1960)
- I'll Write Your Name In the Sand (King, 1961)
- Maddox Brothers and Rose (Wrangler Records, 1962)
- Go Honky Tonkin! (Hilltop Records, 1965)
- America's Most Colorful Hillbilly Band, v.1 (Arhoolie Records, 1976 [LP]; 1993 [CD])
- America's Most Colorful Hillbilly Band, v.2 (Arhoolie, 1976 [LP]; 1995 [CD])
- Old Pals of Yesterday (Picc-A-Dilly, 1980)
- On the Air, v.1 (Arhoolie, 1983 [LP]; 1996 [CD])
- Maddox Bros. and Rose: Columbia Historic Edition (Columbia Records, 1984)
- On the Air, v.2 (Arhoolie, 1985 [LP]; 1996 [CD])
- Live - On the Radio (Arhoolie, 1996) recorded 1953
- The Hillbilly Boogie Years (Rockateer, 1996) all recordings on Columbia
- The Most Colorful Hillbilly Band in America (Bear Family Records, 1998) 4-CD set
- A Proper Introduction to Maddox Brothers & Rose: That'll Learn Ya Durn Ya (Proper Records, 2004)
