= Proper Crimbo =

2003 Christmas song by Leigh Francis with other artists

Single by Bo' Selecta! featuring various artists
- Released: 15 December 2003
- Genre: Comedy, pop
- Length: 3:44
- Songwriter: Leigh Francis
- Producer: Bo' Selecta

Bo' Selecta! featuring various artists singles chronology
"Proper Crimbo" (2003)	"I Got You Babe / Soda Pop" (2004)

"Proper Crimbo" is a Christmas song written and performed by the creator of the British comedy programme Bo' Selecta!, Leigh Francis, featuring various artists. "Crimbo" is an English slang term for Christmas. Released in December 2003, the single peaked at number four on the UK singles chart and remained in the charts for nine weeks.

== Artists ==
- The 3AM Girls
- 4 Poofs and a Piano
- Simon Amstell
- Ade Adepitan
- Richard Bacon
- Chris Bisson
- Melanie Blatt
- Edith Bowman
- Melanie Brown
- Adam Buxton
- Jimmy Carr
- Joe Cornish
- Terri Dwyer
- Jenni Falconer
- Caroline Flack
- Leigh Francis
- Kirsty Gallacher
- Bob Geldof
- Jade Goody
- David Gray
- Christine Hamilton
- Harvey
- Katy Hill
- Kerry Katona
- John Leslie
- Chris Moyles
- Dermot O'Leary
- Denise van Outen
- Ozzy Rezat
- Gavin Rossdale
- Ben Shephard
- David Sneddon
- Kate Thornton
- Holly Valance
- Matthew Wright

== Music video ==
The music video for the song sees Francis perform as other characters over the track. The video begins with a parody of Michael Jackson's Thriller, with Matthew Wright and Jackson driving through the woods at night, before their car breaks down. Instead of turning into a werewolf like in the original, Jackson transforms into a variety of different animals, eventually turning into John Leslie, who gives chase to Wright asking for a "wee chat" (a year before the video was shot, Wright had erroneously named Leslie as the figure at the centre of fellow presenter Ulrika Jonsson's claim in her autobiography that a famous TV presenter had raped her). After this, various celebrities perform alongside Bo' Selecta characters singing along to the song.

== Track listing ==
CD single
No.	Title	Length
1.	"Proper Crimbo" (Single Version)	3:36
2.	"Mista Moonwalk"	4:12
3.	"Xmas Time Is Here (Again...)"	3:29

DVD single
No.	Title	Length
1.	"Proper Crimbo" (Full-length video and making of)	14:57
2.	"Proper Crimbo" (Single Version) (Audio)	3:36
3.	"Proper Crimbo" (A cappella Version) (Video)	3:55
4.	"Proper Crimbo" (A cappella Version) (Audio)	3:45

12" picture disc
No.	Title	Length
1.	"Proper Crimbo" (Single Version)	3:36
2.	"Mista Moonwalk" (12" Version)	5:43

== Charts ==
Chart (2003)	Peak position
UK Singles (OCC)	4

=== Year-end charts ===
Chart (2003)	Position
UK Singles (OCC)	36
