= Under the Tree (The Water Babies song) =

"Under The Tree"

Single by the Water Babies
- Released: 12 December 2005
- Recorded: 2005
- Genre: Pop
- Length: 3:32
- Label: Angel Music
- Songwriter: Peter Lawlor
- Producer: Peter Lawlor

"Under the Tree" is a single by the Water Babies released in the UK on 12 December 2005. It was written by Peter Lawlor, formerly of Stiltskin, for a Vodafone 3G advertisement, which appeared on television in the weeks preceding Christmas. The song was in the UK Singles Chart Top 75 for three weeks, entering at No. 30 on 24 December 2005, and peaked at position 27 the following week.
