= Christine Hamilton =

English media personality and author

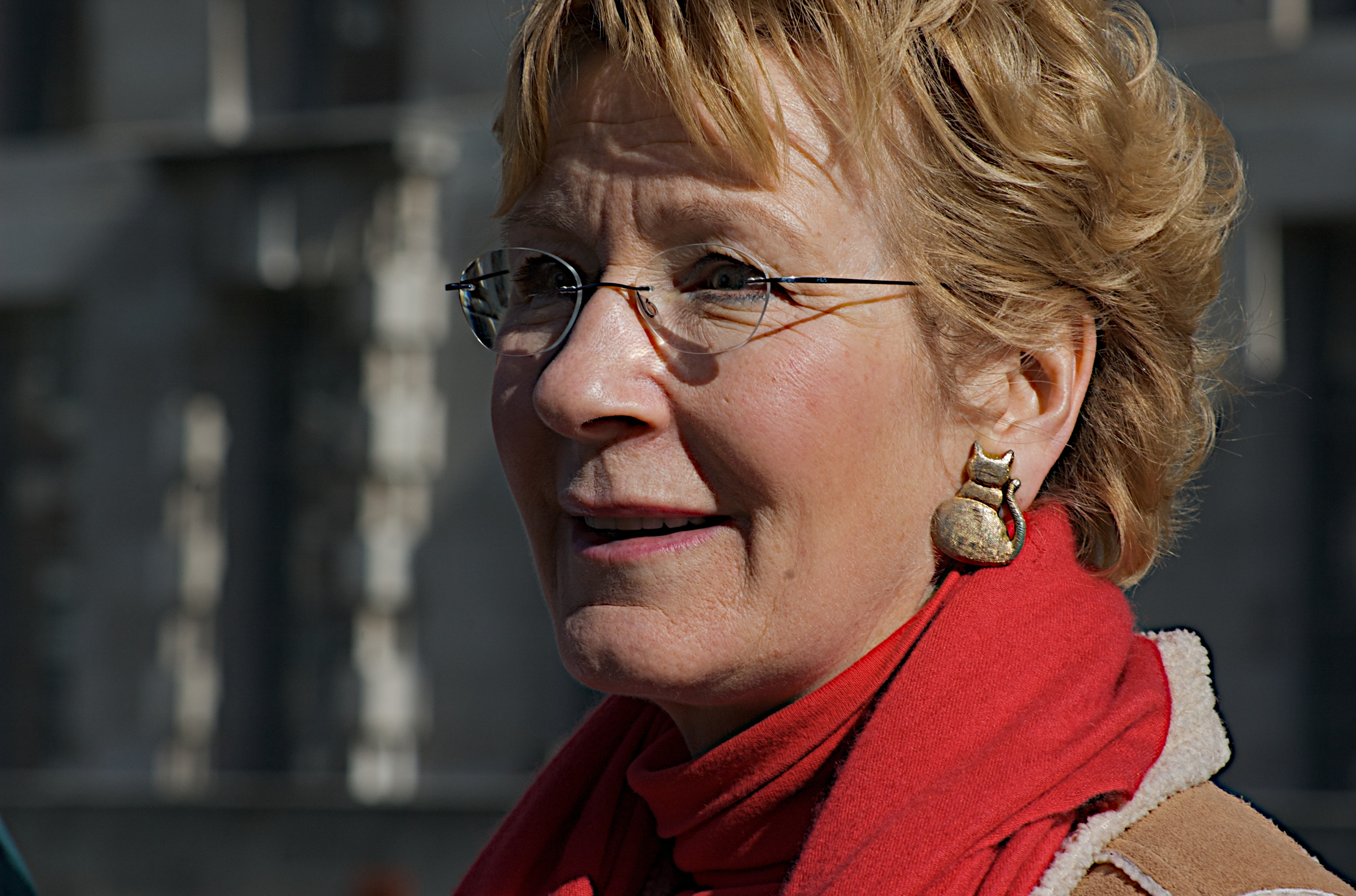
- Hamilton in 2008
- Born: Mary Christine Holman; 10 November 1949 (age 76); Bournemouth, England
- Education: University of York
- Occupations: Secretary; media personality; public speaker; author
- Political party: UK Independence Party
- Spouse: Neil Hamilton (m. 1983)

Mary Christine Hamilton (née Holman; born 10 November 1949) is an English media personality and author. She is married to Neil Hamilton, the former Conservative Member of Parliament (MP) for Tatton.

Hamilton and her husband were prominent supporters of the UK Independence Party (UKIP). Neil was elected to Welsh Parliament as the leader of UKIP Wales in 2016 and served until he was defeated in the 2021 Senedd election. He became acting leader of UKIP in 2020 and was elected leader of the party in 2021, serving until May 2024.

== Early life ==
Hamilton's father was a GP in Ringwood, Hampshire, and she grew up in the New Forest area. She attended Wentworth College, an independent boarding school for girls in Bournemouth and a co-educational Grammar School in Christchurch, Hampshire. She then studied sociology at the University of York and first met Neil Hamilton when they both attended a student political conference. In 2006, they released a song coinciding with the World Cup, "England Are Jolly Dee".

== Career ==
=== MP's secretary ===
Hamilton spent many years working as secretary to various Conservative MPs, first Wilfred Proudfoot MP for Brighouse and Spenborough, then Gerald Nabarro, MP for South Worcestershire. She stood behind Nabarro as he spoke on the steps of Winchester Court after being cleared on appeal of a motoring offence. Hamilton worked as her husband's secretary following their 1983 marriage. Neil Hamilton eventually reached the post of Minister for Corporate Affairs between 1992 and 1994 in Prime Minister John Major's government. Neil Hamilton became embroiled in the Cash-for-questions affair, and the former BBC broadcaster Martin Bell stood against him for the Tatton seat at the 1997 general election. Bell campaigned as an ‘anti-sleaze’ candidate, and Christine Hamilton confronted him during a televised press conference on Knutsford Heath, which brought her to public prominence. Hamilton later described the confrontation with Bell as "...the making of me." The journalist John Sweeney later published Purple Homicide, an account of the campaign for the Tatton seat. Neil Hamilton's later failure in a libel case against the Egyptian businessman, Mohamed Al-Fayed, would lead to her husband's bankruptcy. Their home in Nether Alderley, Cheshire was sold to the market for £1.25 million.

=== Entertainment personality ===
Following Hamilton's electoral defeat, Christine and her husband appeared together on the satirical BBC quiz show Have I Got News for You, on 9 May 1997, an appearance that established her as a chat-show personality and she subsequently appeared on programmes including her own Christine Hamilton Show on BBC Choice where she interviewed celebrities who suffered some form of adversity, including Jonathan Aitken, James Hewitt, Bernard Manning, Ivana Trump, Paul Merson and John Fashanu.

Hamilton has described herself as a "media butterfly" and has appeared on a variety of television shows since her husband's electoral defeat. Hamilton came third in the first series of the reality television programme, I'm a Celebrity...Get Me Out of Here! in 2002, and reached the final of Celebrity Masterchef in 2010. Hamilton appeared on Have I Got News for You in 2002 and taunted presenter Angus Deayton over recent tabloid revelations about his personal life.

In the theatre, Hamilton has appeared in pantomime in Jack and the Beanstalk at the Yvonne Arnaud Theatre, Guildford in 2002, as the Fairy Godmother in Cinderella at the Kettering Lighthouse Theatre in 2011 and has taken the role of the narrator for The Rocky Horror Show musical. Hamilton toured her one-woman show, Share an Evening with Christine Hamilton, in 2003, and has appeared several times in Eve Ensler's play The Vagina Monologues, including its 2005 West End run at Wyndhams Theatre, where she appeared alongside Jenny Eclair and Heather Small. The Hamiltons appeared at the Edinburgh Festival in 2006 with their show, Lunch with the Hamiltons, at the Pleasance Dome in 2006.

Hamilton was the face of 'British Sausage Week' in 2005 and the judge of 'Mr Gay Torbay' in 2009. Hamilton legally changed her name by deed poll to 'Mrs British Battleaxe' in February 2009 as a promotion for an online deed service company. She later regretted the decision.

=== Media commentator, presenter and writer ===
Hamilton has appeared on numerous topical television programmes including GMTV, Loose Women, This Week, The Alan Titchmarsh Show, This Morning and The Wright Stuff. Hamilton has also been a dictionary corner guest on Countdown.

Hamilton also interviewed successful women in business for the digital channel Simply Money, has presented programmes on Sky Digital's Destination Lunch, and stood in for Gloria Hunniford and Fern Britton on Open House and This Morning.

As a writer Hamilton published The Book of British Battleaxes in 1999, and an autobiography, For Better For Worse: Her Own Story, in 2005. Hamilton has also written columns for Western Daily Press and the gay magazine Refresh.

=== Other activities ===
In 2018 Muscular Dystrophy UK dropped Hamilton as one of their charity ambassadors due to her comments reported by the BBC as "comparing burqas to the hoods of the Ku Klux Klan".

=== False allegation ===
Along with her husband, she was arrested in May 2001 by police investigating an alleged rape that was found to be false. The event was recorded on film by Louis Theroux, who happened to be spending time with the Hamiltons for an episode of his documentary series When Louis Met.... The episode was released in December 2001.

Their accuser, Nadine Milroy-Sloan, was charged with attempting to pervert the course of justice, and in 2002 sentenced to 3 years imprisonment for making the false accusations. In 2005 Hamilton and her husband successfully sued Max Clifford for slander and libel in connection to his comments whilst representing Milroy-Sloan.
