= Lemon La Vida Loca =

- Genre: Sitcom; Mockumentary
- Created by: Keith Lemon
- Written by: Keith Lemon
- Directed by: Paul King
- Starring: Keith Lemon; Laura Aikman (2012)
- Opening theme: "Lemon La Vida Loca"
- Country of origin: United Kingdom
- No. of series: 2 + 2 Christmas specials
- No. of episodes: 12

Production
- Executive producers: Dan Baldwin; Leon Wilson
- Running time: 45 minutes
- Production company: Talkback in association with Bang Tidy Productions

Original release
- Network: ITV2
- Release: 2 August 2012 – 11 July 2013

Related
- Celebrity Juice; Keith Lemon's LemonAid; Through the Keyhole

Lemon La Vida Loca is a British mock reality show created, written by, and starring Keith Lemon. The show's title is derived from Ricky Martin's 1999 hit single, "Livin' la Vida Loca".

The series follows the character of television personality Keith Lemon, capturing his home and work life, and everything in between. The series began airing on 2 August 2012 on ITV2, and concluded its first series on 23 August 2012. Whilst on Let's Do Lunch with Gino & Mel, Lemon announced that a Christmas special of Lemon La Vida Loca would air in December. He confirmed this news on his Twitter account as well. A second series began airing on 6 June 2013. Aikman announced that she would not be returning to the show for the second series, but she did make an appearance on the first episode of the second series.

It was announced in January 2014 that Lemon La Vida Loca would not be renewed for a third series.

== Cast ==
=== Main cast ===
- Leigh Francis as Keith Lemon
- Laura Aikman as Rosie Parker (2012–13)

=== Celebrity cameos ===
- Kelly Brook as herself
- Jodie Marsh as herself
- Jenny Powell as herself
- Danny Dyer as himself
- Stacey Solomon as herself
- Holly Willoughby as herself
- Rick Edwards as himself
- Antony Costa as himself
- Fearne Cotton as herself
- Chris Fountain as himself
- Toby Anstis as himself
- Michelle Keegan as herself
- Gary Barlow as himself
- Mark Wright as himself
- Patsy Kensit as herself
- Coleen Nolan as herself
- Eamonn Holmes as himself
- Ruth Langsford as herself
- Emily Atack as herself
- Paddy McGuinness as himself
- Joe Swash as himself
- Brian Belo as himself
- Fazer as himself
- Laura Whitmore as herself
- Jessica-Jane Clement as herself
- Chico Slimani as himself
- Jade Jones as himself
- Hank Osasuna as mad Paul
- Caroline Flack as herself
- Verne Troyer as himself
- Fabio Lanzoni as himself
- Tara Reid as herself

== Episodes ==
| Series | Episodes | Originally released | |
| Series | Episodes | First released | Last released |
|---|---|---|---|
| 1 | 4 | 2 August 2012 | 23 August 2012 |
| Christmas | 2 | 4 December 2012 | 5 December 2012 |
| 2 | 6 | 6 June 2013 | 11 July 2013 |

=== Series 1 (2012) ===
| No. overall | No. in series | Title | Directed by | Written by | Original release date | UK viewers (millions) |
|---|---|---|---|---|---|---|
| 1 | 1 | "Rosie's Arrival" | Paul King | Leigh Francis | 2 August 2012 | 1.28 |
| 2 | 2 | "The Dinner Party" | Paul King | Leigh Francis | 9 August 2012 | 1.08 |
| 3 | 3 | "Jetting Off" | Paul King | Leigh Francis | 16 August 2012 | 0.94 |
| 4 | 4 | "Apology Accepted" | Paul King | Leigh Francis | 23 August 2012 | 1.06 |

=== Christmas specials (2012) ===
| No. overall | No. in series | Title | Directed by | Written by | Original release date | UK viewers (millions) |
|---|---|---|---|---|---|---|
| 5 | 1 | "Merry Keithmas (Part 1)" | Jamie Deeks; Dan Johnston | Leigh Francis | 4 December 2012 | 0.91 |
| 6 | 2 | "Merry Keithmas (Part 2)" | Jamie Deeks; Dan Johnston | Leigh Francis | 5 December 2012 | 0.77 |

=== Series 2 (2013) ===
The second series began on 6 June 2013 at 10pm on ITV2.

| No. overall | No. in series | Title | Directed by | Written by | Original release date | UK viewers (millions) |
|---|---|---|---|---|---|---|
| 7 | 1 | "Singing Career" | Paul King | Leigh Francis | 6 June 2013 | 0.78 |
| 8 | 2 | "Acting Career" | Paul King | Leigh Francis | 13 June 2013 | 0.499 |
| 9 | 3 | "Martial Arts" | Paul King | Leigh Francis | 20 June 2013 | N/A |
| 10 | 4 | "Back to the Future: The Musical" | Paul King | Leigh Francis | 27 June 2013 | N/A |
| 11 | 5 | "Hollywood" | Paul King | Leigh Francis | 4 July 2013 | N/A |
| 12 | 6 | "Keith's Birthday" | Paul King | Leigh Francis | 11 July 2013 | N/A |

== Distribution ==
The complete first and second series of Lemon La Vida Loca was released onto DVD on 18 November 2013 as a three-disc set.
