= Kelly Brook =

English actress and model (born 1979)

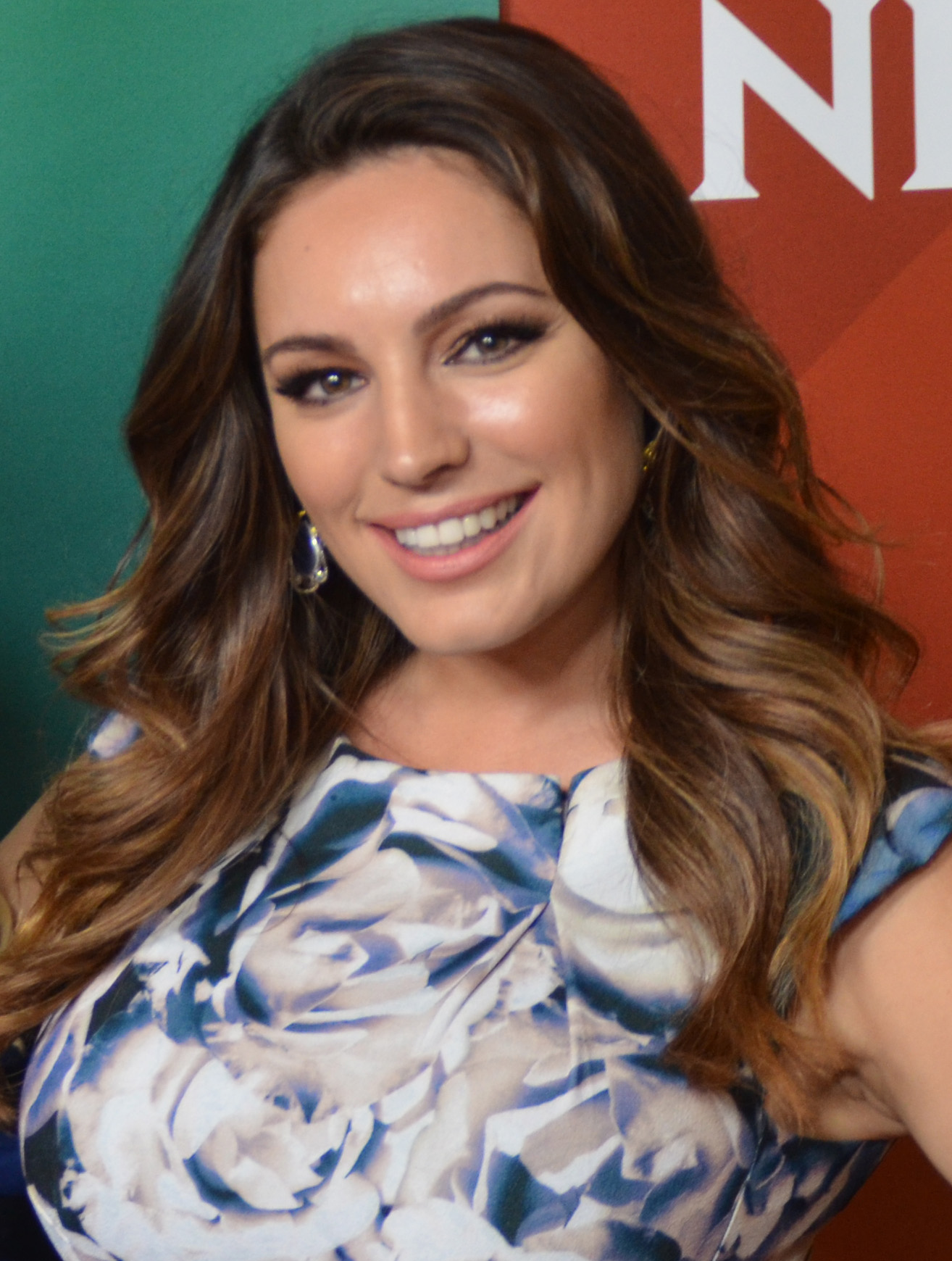
- Brook in 2015
- Born: Kelly Anne Parsons; 23 November 1979 (age 46); Rochester, Kent, England
- Education: Italia Conti Academy of Theatre Arts
- Occupations: Model; actress; media personality
- Years active: 1996–present
- Spouse: Jeremy Parisi (m. 2022)

Kelly Brook (born Kelly Anne Parsons; 23 November 1979) is an English model, actress, and media personality. She began her career modelling for a range of advertising campaigns, which led to her discovery by the editorial team of the Daily Star tabloid, where they featured her as a Page 3 girl. She was crowned FHM's Sexiest Woman in the World in 2005, and as of 2015 had featured in every FHM 100 Sexiest countdown since 1998.

As an actress, Brook has appeared in the films Ripper (2001), The Italian Job (2003), House of 9 (2004), Survival Island (2005), Fishtales (2007), Piranha 3D (2010), and Taking Stock (2015). She has appeared on numerous reality television shows, including Strictly Come Dancing (2007), Britain's Got Talent (2009), Celebrity Juice (2012–2015), The Great Stand Up to Cancer Bake Off (2020), The Masked Dancer (2021), Celebrity Race Across the World (2024), and I'm a Celebrity...Get Me Out of Here! (2025). Since 2019, Brook has co-presented Heart London's Drivetime Radio Show with Jason King.

== Early life ==
Brook was born Kelly Anne Parsons on 23 November 1979 in Rochester, Kent, the daughter of Sandra Kelly, a cook, and Kenneth Parsons, a scaffolder. She has a younger brother, Damian, and an older half-sister, Sasha. Kenneth Parsons died, aged 57, in Rochester from lung cancer, on 26 November 2007, during Brook's time on Strictly Come Dancing. Brook attended the Thomas Aveling School in Warren Wood, Rochester.

During her early life, Brook worked at a bakery next to a religious convent, and she seriously considered becoming a Catholic nun after observing convent life. In an discussion on Loose Women, she recalled that she found the convent lifestyle attractive: "I thought, that is such a nice lifestyle. I could see myself doing that." However, when she realised that nuns had to be committed to sexual abstinence, she decided "maybe it's not for me". Other than celibacy, "the rest of it, the whole kind of nun's life thing, I'm so here for."

In 1996, at the age of seventeen, she appeared in the second series of Fist of Fun, the BBC comedy show from Stewart Lee and Richard Herring as a schoolgirl in a series of sketches entitled 'Teachers' (one of her co-stars was the young Daniel Mays). She studied at the Italia Conti Academy of Theatre Arts for three years, before becoming a professional model at the age of 16.

== Modelling career ==
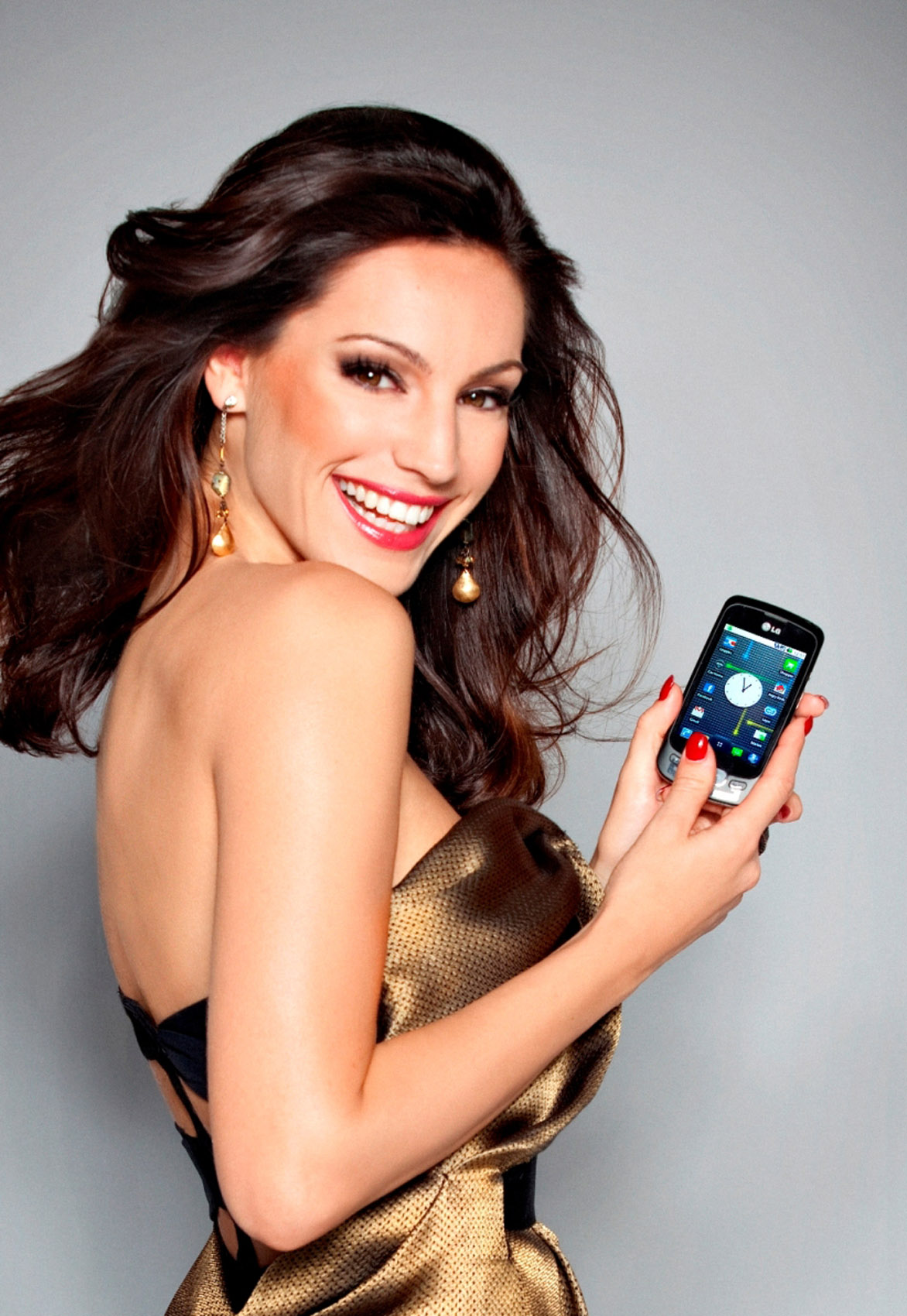
Brook in a campaign for the LG Optimus One mobile phone in 2010

Brook's modelling career began at 16 after she won a beauty competition, into which her mother had entered her. She later worked on a range of advertising campaigns, including Foster's Lager, Renault Mégane, Walker's crisps, Piz Buin and Bravissimo, a company that specialises in bras and lingerie for large-breasted women. Soon after, she caught the eye of the editorial team of the Daily Star tabloid, which began featuring her as a Page Three girl. Brook's picture soon began appearing in other lads' mags such as GQ, Loaded and FHM. A poll of over 5,000 women for Grazia magazine considered her to have the best British female body. She also topped the "FHM 100 Sexiest Women in the World" list in 2005, which was said to have polled 15 million people. Appearing in this list every year since 1998, she ranked No. 34 in 2008, No. 67 in 2009, and No. 7 in 2010. She was the cover star of FHM's World Cup 2010 special issue, and was on the cover of the magazine in April 2011.

In February 2007, it was announced that Brook had signed a contract, reported to be worth around £1m, to represent Unilever's Lynx body spray, known as "Axe" in the US and in continental Europe. She has appeared on billboards, in newspapers and on-line as part of their advertising campaign. She also appeared in commercials for Sky+ and T-Mobile and modelled for Reebok. In 2010, she was chosen as the "new face and body" of lingerie maker Ultimo's advertising campaign. In September 2010, Brook appeared in the American edition of Playboy magazine. In October 2010, Brook appeared live at Clapham Picture House to surprise cinemagoers as part of a promotion for Carlsberg and Sky 3D. In November 2010, Brook presented an award at MTV's EMA's in Madrid. Brook produced a line of swimwear with New Look, for which she has modelled. In September 2014, Brook launched a clothing line for Simply Be. The following year, she became a brand ambassador for Skechers.

== Acting career ==
In 2000, Brook made her full-screen debut with a minor role in the film Sorted. Shortly after that, she appeared in the film Ripper. She played the girlfriend of Clark Kent/Superman's nemesis Lex Luthor in four episodes of the American science fiction drama Smallville during the show's first season (2001–02). She has also completed assignments as a film actress in Canada and made a short appearance as Lyle's girlfriend in the 2003 film The Italian Job. Her first starring role was in the 2004 film School for Seduction, for which she received positive reviews. In 2004, she played character Nikki Morris in the video game Need for Speed Underground 2, alongside Brooke Burke. In 2005, she appeared in the Philippe Vidal thriller House of 9, and starred opposite Billy Zane in the survival thriller Survival Island, also known as Three.

In 2006, she starred in an Agatha Christie's Marple drama on ITV and appeared as herself throughout the second series of Moving Wallpaper, also for ITV, in 2009. She acted in the science fiction thriller Shadow Play, directed by Nick Simon. Brook had a leading role in the horror comedy remake Piranha 3D. The film received a worldwide theatrical release on 20 August 2010. Piranha 3D opened to generally positive reviews and commercial success, grossing $83.2 million on a budget of $24 million.

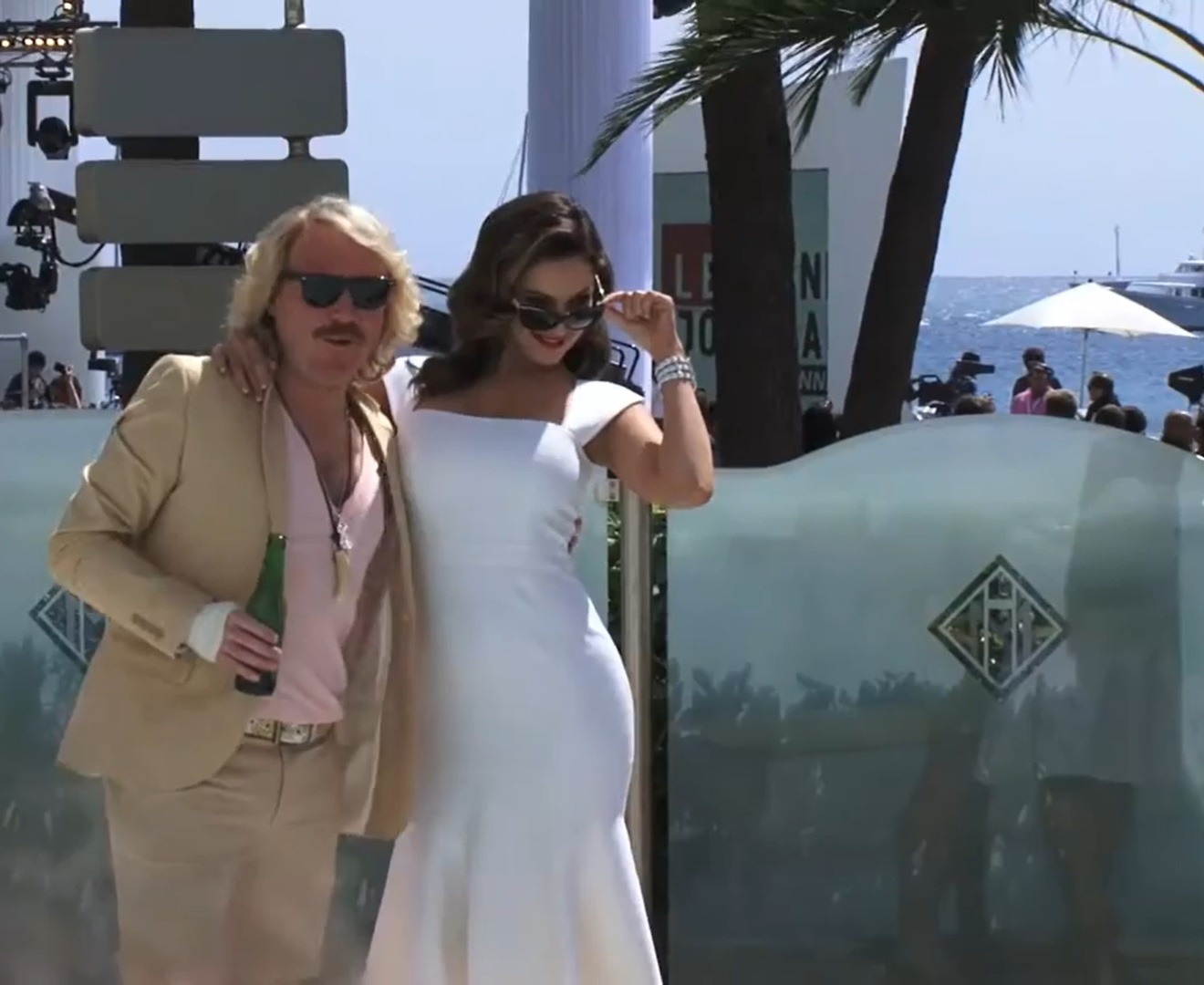
Kelly Brook with Keith Lemon (Leigh Francis) at the 2012 Cannes Film Festival

Kelly played herself alongside Leigh Francis in the British comedy film Keith Lemon: The Film (2012), which won 'Funniest Film' at the 2013 Loaded Lafta Awards. In 2013, Brook appeared in the video to Lawson's song "Juliet". In 2014 she was cast as Prudence in an NBC sitcom pilot called One Big Happy, which was subsequently picked up on 9 May.

=== Theatre ===
In December 2000, she played exotic dancer Anya in the play Eye Contact at the Riverside Studios in Hammersmith. In October 2008, she returned to the West End as Jeannie, in Neil LaBute's Fat Pig at London's Comedy Theatre. In November 2009, she began playing Celia in Calendar Girls at the Noël Coward Theatre. Brook made a cameo appearance in the cabaret show "Forever Crazy" by Crazy Horse London end of 2012.

== Other work ==
=== Music videos ===
In 1997, at age 17, Brook appeared as a nurse in the music video for the KMFDM song "Megalomaniac". That same year, Brook appeared in the video for Pulp's "Help the Aged" with Huck Whitney of the band the Flaming Stars, in a slow dance sequence. In 2013, Brook appeared in the Lawson music video for their song "Juliet", in the role of Juliet.

=== Television presenting ===
In 1997, aged 18, Brook started presenting youth television programmes on MTV UK & Ireland, Granada Television and the Trouble TV channel. Brook had a breakthrough into mainstream presenting in January 1999, when she was chosen to replace Denise van Outen as the female half of The Big Breakfast hosting team, alongside Johnny Vaughan. She left the show in July 1999. In 2005, she hosted the reality television programme Celebrity Love Island for ITV.

=== Reality television ===
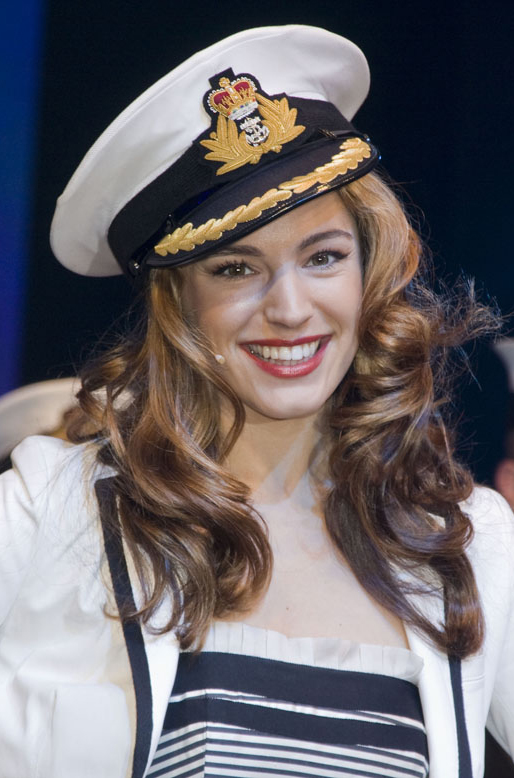
Brook at the 2009 London Boat Show

In 2007, Brook participated in the celebrity dancing competition Strictly Come Dancing on BBC1 with a dance partner Brendan Cole. During the TV series, her father, Kenneth Parsons, died of cancer. Although initially decided to continue dancing in his memory, she withdrew from the competition in week nine. She also competed in the Strictly Come Dancing Christmas Special 2008, dancing the Jive with Brian Fortuna, Brendan Cole having to compete with his later partner Lisa Snowdon. Brook and Fortuna were put into fourth place, but with the studio audience's vote, they came second to Jill Halfpenny and Darren Bennett. In 2008, Brook took Jennifer Ellison's place as one of the three judges on the second series of the reality TV programme Dirty Dancing: The Time of Your Life, broadcast between September and November 2008.

In January 2009, she joined the third series of Britain's Got Talent as a fourth judge but was subsequently axed from the programme after less than a week on the panel, the producers having decided the four-judge format was "too complicated". Brook was billed as a guest judge in the episode in which she appeared, taped in Manchester and aired on 16 May. In 2013, Brook became a temporary team captain on Celebrity Juice aired on ITV2. She appeared in Season 9, replacing Fearne Cotton while she was on maternity leave. In 2016, Brook served as a team captain on the Channel 5 panel show It's Not Me, It's You. In 2021, Brook appeared on The Masked Dancer, masked as a Frog. She was the eighth celebrity to be unmasked in the semi-final.

In 2024, Brook competed alongside her husband Jeremy Parisi on the second series of Celebrity Race Across the World. They ultimately finished fourth. In November 2025, it was announced that Brook would appear as a contestant on the twenty-fifth series of I'm a Celebrity...Get Me Out of Here!. She finished the show in 9th place.

=== Books ===
In September 2014, Brook released her autobiography; it reached the Sunday Times Bestseller list on 21 September. Domestic violence groups criticised her during her promotional tour for laughing about punching ex-boyfriends Jason Statham and Danny Cipriani in the face.

=== Business ===
At end of 2013, Brook opened her bar Steam and Rye in London in partnership with Nick House. In June 2014, Steam and Rye won Bar of the Year at the London Club and Bar Awards.

=== Radio ===
Since January 2019, Brook has co-presented Heart London Drivetime and Saturday Breakfast with Jason King.

== Personal life ==
In 2014, on an appearance on ITV's This Morning, she admitted to punching previous boyfriends Jason Statham and Danny Cipriani in the face, with Men's Domestic Abuse charity Menkind subsequently issuing a statement saying it was "extremely disappointed" by the segment. In July 2022, Brook married her longtime boyfriend Jeremy Parisi, whom she had dated since 2015. She has spoken publicly about Parisi's committed Catholic faith, and the role that religion plays in their marriage and family.

== Filmography ==
=== Film ===
Year	Title	Role	Notes
2000	Sorted	Sarah	
2001	Ripper	Marisa Tavares	
2003	Absolon	Claire	
2003	The Italian Job	Lyle's Girlfriend	
2004	School for Seduction	Sophia Rosselini	
2005	House of 9	Lea	
2005	Deuce Bigalow: European Gigolo	Beautiful Woman in Painting	
2005	Survival Island	Jennifer	Also known as Three
2006	In the Mood	Eva	Short film
2007	Fishtales	Neried	
2010	Piranha 3D	Danni Arslow	
2010	Removal	Kirby	
2012	Keith Lemon: The Film	Herself	
2015	Taking Stock	Kate	Won 4 awards at the Monaco International Film Festival
2018	Santet	Laura	

=== Television ===
Year	Title	Role	Notes
1996	Fist of Fun	Suzanne	2 episodes
1999	The Big Breakfast	Co-Presenter	Alongside Johnny Vaughan
2000	This Is Your Life	Herself	1 episode
2000	TFI Friday	Guest Presenter	1 episode
2001	The (Mis)Adventures of Fiona Plum	Fiona Plum	Unaired pilot
2002	Smallville	Victoria Hardwick	4 episodes
2005	Romy and Michele: In the Beginning	Linda Fashiobella	Television film
2005	Tricky TV	Herself	1 episode
2005	Celebrity Love Island	Presenter	
2006	Agatha Christie's Marple	Elsie Holland	Episode: "The Moving Finger"
2007	Hotel Babylon	Lady Catherine Stanwood	1 episode
2007	Strictly Come Dancing	Contestant	Sixth place
2007	Dirty Dancing: The Time of Your Life	Presenter	
2009	Moving Wallpaper	Kelly Brook	Fictional version of herself
2009	Renaissance	Samantha	Episode: "Moving Wallpaper"
2009	The F Word	Herself	1 episode
2009	The One Show	Herself	1 episode
2009	Britain's Got Talent	Guest Judge	Series 3 auditions
2010	Let's Dance For Comic Relief	Guest Judge	
2011	Skins	Jemima	1 episode
2011	Celebrity Naked Ambition	Presenter	
2011–2017	Celebrity Juice	Herself	20 episodes
2012	Métal Hurlant Chronicles	Skarr / Jen	2 episodes
2012	Nimrod in Cannes	Herself	
2012	Lemon la Vida Loca	Herself	1 episode
2013	Trollied	Herself	1 episode
2013	NTSF:SD:SUV::	Anna	
2015	One Big Happy	Prudence	1 series
2016	It's Not Me, It's You	Herself	Team captain
2016	Through the Keyhole	Herself	Christmas special
2016	The Keith Lemon Sketch Show	Herself	Series 2, Episode 6
2018	Wedding Day Winners	Herself	
2018	Midsomer Murders	Laurel Newman	Episode "Till Death Do Us Part"
2018	The Million Pound Holiday Club	Herself	TV special
2018	Celebrity Antiques Road Trip	Herself	1 episode
2019	Harry Hill's Alien Fun Capsule	Herself	1 episode
2020	The Great Stand Up to Cancer Bake Off	Contestant	
2018, 2024- Present	Loose Women	Panellist	Herself
2021	The Masked Dancer	Frog / Contestant	Fifth place
2024	Celebrity Race Across the World	Contestant	
2025	I'm a Celebrity...Get Me Out of Here!	Contestant	Series 25

=== Television advertisements ===
Year	Advert	Role	Notes
1998	Sure Deodorant	Nicky	
2001	Kit Kat	Herself	
2003, 2008, 2011	Sky+	Herself	
2008	Pepsi	Herself	
2008	Tefal	Herself	Alongside Harry Enfield and Carol Vorderman
2009	T-Mobile	Herself	
2010	Sony Pictures Television	Herself	
2012	Reebok	Herself	
2013	Axe	Astronaut	In Turkey
2017, 2019	Baylis & Harding	Herself	
2018	Skechers	Herself	
2021	SlimFast	Herself	

=== Music videos ===
Year	Music video	Artist	Role
1997	"Megalomaniac"	KMFDM	Nurse
1997	"Help the Aged"	Pulp	Herself
2013	"Juliet"	Lawson	Juliet

== Bibliography ==
- Close Up (2014) (autobiography)
