= Laura Aikman =

British actress (born 1985)

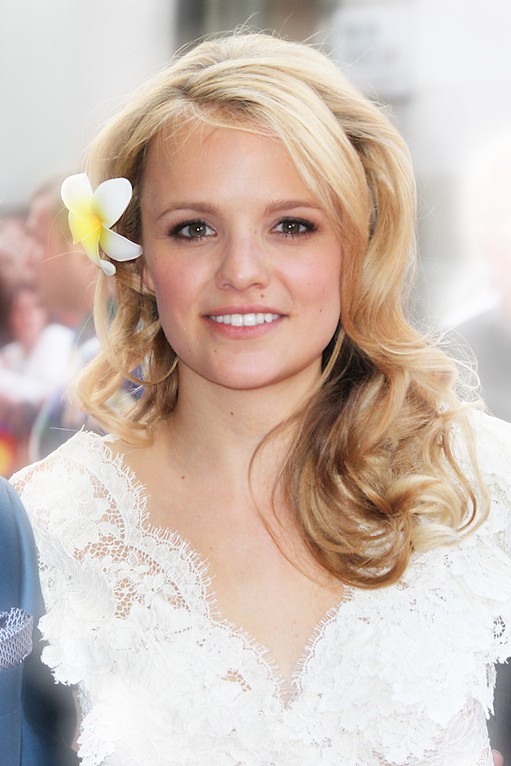
- Aikman in 2013
- Born: Laura Holly Aikman; 24 December 1985 (age 40); Brent, London, England
- Occupation: Actress
- Years active: 1996–present
- Spouse: Matt Kennard (m. 2019)

Laura Holly Aikman (born 24 December 1985) is an English actress. She has appeared in television shows including The Mysti Show (2004–2005), Casualty (2009–2010), Lemon La Vida Loca (2012–2013), 4 O'Clock Club (2012–2014), The Job Lot (2014–2015), Waterloo Road (2015), Gavin & Stacey (2019 and 2024), and This City Is Ours (2025–2026).

== Early life ==
Aikman was born in the London Borough of Brent in 1985, the daughter of actor and writer Stuart Aikman (known as Stuart St Paul) and actress Jean Heard. She grew up in Northwood, Hertfordshire and attended Haberdashers' Aske's School for Girls in Elstree, Hertfordshire.

== Career ==
In 2009, she appeared in the BBC Three series Personal Affairs playing Lucy. On 8 August 2009, it was announced that Aikman would be joining the cast of Casualty, and her role as May Phelps started on 12 September 2009. Aikman appeared in 35 episodes, her final appearance aired on 8 May 2010. Aikman also appeared in the original pilot episode of "The Inbetweeners".

In 2012, Aikman starred alongside Leigh Francis's character Keith Lemon in his TV show Lemon La Vida Loca during the first series. She played the role of his Yorkshire girlfriend, Rosie. Aikman announced that she would not be returning to the show for the second series despite making an appearance in episode 1. In July 2014, it was announced that Aikman would be joining the cast of Waterloo Road for the tenth and final series as deputy headteacher Lorna Hutchinson. In 2014-15, Aikman had a leading role in the second and third series of The Job Lot.

In 2018, Aikman joined 26 other celebrities at Metropolis Studios, to perform an original Christmas song called "Rock With Rudolph", which was written and produced by Grahame and Jack Corbyn. The song was in aid of Great Ormond Street Hospital and was released digitally on independent record label Saga Entertainment on 30 November 2018 under the artist name The Celebs. The music video debuted exclusively with The Sun on 29 November 2018 and had its first TV showing on Good Morning Britain on 30 November 2018. The song peaked at number two on the iTunes pop chart.

== Personal life ==
Aikman has been married to actor Matt Kennard since 2019; they met when she joined the cast for the final season (2015) of Bluestone 42. Aikman volunteered with Shout 85258, providing mental health support throughout 2022. Aikman has Ulcerative colitis. Her father is former stuntman Stuart St. Paul.

== Filmography ==
Key
†	Denotes productions that have not yet been released

=== Film ===
Year	Title	Role	Notes
1996	Surviving Picasso	Maya Widmaier-Picasso	
1997	The Usual Children	Hela	
1998	The Scarlet Tunic	Dotty Marlowe	
1999	Great Expectations	Young Biddy	
1999	Virtual Sexuality	Lucy Parker	
2005	Rude Awakenings	Ally	Short film
2007	Popcorn	Jeannie	
2007	Blood Monkey	Sydney Maas	Direct-to-video
2008	The Trevor Ending Story	Sally	Short film
2010	Freight	Julie Taylor	
2011	Six Degrees	Student Girl	Short film
2012	Keith Lemon: The Film	Rosie	
2013	Bula Quo!	Caroline	a.k.a. Guitars, Guns and Paradise!
2014	Cancer Hair	Claire	Short film
2015	Amar Akbar & Tony	Samantha	
2016	The Hatching	Lucy	
2017	Lady M	Chloe	Short film
2020	Settlers	Sam	Short film
2021	Milk	Lydia	Short film
2021	@	Natalie	Short film
2022	This Is Christmas	Polly	
2023	Scrapper	Kaye	
2024	Time Travel Is Dangerous	Young Valerie	

=== Television ===
Year	Title	Role	Notes
2000	Casualty	Rebecca Bright	Episode: "Choked:Part One"
2004	Doctors	Katy Harding	Episode: "Inner Circles"
2004	Tracy Beaker Parties with Pudsey	Mysti	TV movie, guest role - part 4 only
2004–2005	The Mysti Show	Mysti	Title character
2006	The Best Man	Alison Poley	TV movie
2007	Trial & Retribution	Kelly Hobson	Episode: "Closure"
2007	The Bill	Tanya Murphy	Episode: "Copy Cat Killer"
2008	Teenage Kicks	Milly Heath	Main cast
2008	Dis/Connected	Paula	TV movie
2008–2009	That Mitchell and Webb Look	Various roles	4 episodes
2009	Demons	Alice	Episode: "Smitten"
2009	FM	Sky	Episode: "Blinded by the Light"
2009	Personal Affairs	Lucy Baxter	Miniseries, main cast
2009–2010	Casualty	May Phelps	Main cast (series 24)
2010	The Adventures of Daniel	Suzie	TV movie
2010	Rules of Love	Receptionist	TV movie
2010	Identity	Olivia Knighton	Episode: "Chelsea Girl"
2010	Jack Taylor	Kelly	Episode: "Purgatory"
2011	Not Going Out	Debbie	Episode: "Debbie"
2012–2013	Lemon La Vida Loca	Rosie Parker	Main cast (series 1), guest (1 episode series 2)
2012–2014	4 O'Clock Club	Mrs Melanie Poppy	Main cast (series 1–2), guest (2 episodes series 3)
2013	Pramface	Jenny	Episode: "Stay at Home Losers"
2013	Way to Go	Julia	Main cast
2013	My Town		
2013–2016	Citizen Khan	Debbie	4 episodes
2014	Siblings	Amanda	Episode: "Burrito Neighbours"
2014–2015	The Job Lot	Natalie Mason	Main cast (series 2–3)
2015	Waterloo Road	Lorna Hutchinson	Recurring role (series 10)
2015	Bluestone 42	Ellen	Main cast (series 3)
2016	Comedy Playhouse	Georgy	Episode: "Stop/Start"
2016	Josh	Amy	Episode: "Sex & Politics"
2016	Lovesick	Jo	2 episodes
2017	Liar	D.I. Charlotte Sullivan	Episode: "The Marshes"
2017	So Awkward	Ms Vicky Parfitt	Main cast (series 3)
2018	Shane the Chef	Penny	Recurring voice role, 4 episodes
2018–2019	Space Chickens in Space	Starley	Main cast, voice role
2019	Sadie Sparks	Val Garcia	Recurring voice role
2019	London Kills	Leanne Ponting	2 episodes
2019, 2024	Gavin & Stacey	Sonia	2 episodes: "A Special Christmas" and “Finale”
2020	Incredible Ant	Bibi	Main cast
2020	The Split	Tabby	2 episodes
2021	Death in Paradise	Cherry Jackson	Episode: "Lucky in Love"
2021	The One	Lucy Bell	2 episodes
2021	Shaun the Sheep: The Flight Before Christmas	Ella	Television special
2022	The Rising	Victoria Sands	2 episodes
2023	Archie	Dyan Cannon	Main cast
2024	Joan	Val	5 episodes
2025	Suspect: The Shooting of Jean Charles de Menezes	Lana Vandenberghe	3 episodes
2025–2026	This City Is Ours	Rachel Duffy	Main role
2026	Dragon Striker	TBA	
TBA	Rhona Who Lives by the River †	Rhona #1/Rhona #2	Post-production

=== Theatre ===
- Princess Catherine in Henry V.
- Rebecca Foley in Pravda.
- Connie Batsford in Bus.
- Blousie Brown in Bugsy Malone (musical).
- Cee in BLOODSPORT: After Helen of Troy (play) at Theatre Royal Stratford East

=== Audio ===
Year	Title	Role	Notes
2019	Doctor Who: The New Adventures of Bernice Summerfield Volume 05: Buried Memories	Young Anita	Doctor Who
2020	Susan's War 1	Lootsa	Doctor Who
2020	Doctor Who: Time Apart	Mary Wade	Doctor Who
2020	Torchwood: Ex Machina	Abigail Forehill	Torchwood
2021	The Diary of River Song Series 08	Linos / Shuttle AI	Doctor Who
2021	Master!	Lila Kreeg	Doctor Who
2021	Doctor Who: The Eleventh Doctor Chronicles Volume 02	Sarah Ellison	Doctor Who
2022	Heroes and Villains	Mutoid / Pesh	The Worlds of Blake's 7
2023	The Chimes	Lillian	The Chimes
2025	Rise of the Eukaryans	Narrator	Doctor Who

=== Video games ===
Year	Title	Role	Notes
2012	The Secret World	Various	Voice only
2013	Divinity: Dragon Commander	Scarlett	Voice only
2014	Grid Autosport		Voice only
2014	Dreamfall Chapters	Sister Sahya/Marcurian Rebel	Voice only
2014	Dragon Age: Inquisition	Various	Voice only
2015	Dragon Quest Heroes: The World Tree's Woe and the Blight Below	Various	English version, voice only
2015	Final Fantasy XIV: Heavensward	Yda	English version, voice only
2015	Guitar Hero Live		Voice only
2015	Assassin's Creed Syndicate	London Civilian	Voice only
2015	Assassin's Creed Syndicate: Jack the Ripper	London Civilian	Voice only
2017	Mass Effect: Andromeda	Various	Voice only
2017	Final Fantasy XIV: Stormblood	Lyse	English version, voice only
2017	Dragon Quest XI: Echoes of an Elusive Age	Jade	English version, voice only
2019	Another Eden: The Cat Beyond Time and Space		Voice only
2019	Anthem	Various	Voice only
2019	Final Fantasy XIV: Shadowbringers	Lyse	English version, voice only
2021	Final Fantasy XIV: Endwalker	Lyse	English version, voice only
2023	Final Fantasy XVI	Eloise	Voice only
2024	Dragon's Dogma 2	Doireann	Voice only
