= A Comedy Roast =

British comedy TV show

- Genre: Comedy, entertainment
- Directed by: Ben Caron
- Presented by: Jimmy Carr
- Composer: Nick Foster
- Country of origin: United Kingdom
- Original language: English
- No. of episodes: 5

Production
- Producer: Nicholas Steinberg
- Running time: 60 minutes including adverts
- Production company: Monkey Kingdom

Original release
- Network: Channel 4
- Release: 7 April 2010 – 5 January 2011

A Comedy Roast is a British comedy television show broadcast by Channel 4. After a series of failed attempts by various broadcasters over the years, it is the first adaptation of the American comedy institution of roasting to be produced as a television show in Britain. The first series premiered on 7 April 2010. Hosted by Jimmy Carr it saw Bruce Forsyth, Sharon Osbourne and Chris Tarrant get roasted by various colleagues, comedians and celebrities. The show returned on 15 October 2010 targeting Davina McCall, and again on 5 January 2011 targeting Barbara Windsor.

== Episodes ==
No.	Title	Original release date
1	"Bruce Forsyth: A Comedy Roast"	7 April 2010
Veteran television presenter Bruce Forsyth is roasted by Jonathan Ross, Jack Dee, Jason Manford, Jon Culshaw, Sean Lock, Barry Cryer, and his wife, Wilnelia Merced-Forsyth.
2	"Sharon Osbourne: A Comedy Roast"	8 April 2010
Reality TV judge Sharon Osbourne is roasted by Louis Walsh, Gok Wan, Alan Carr, Patrick Kielty, Keith Lemon, Ronni Ancona, and Dame Edna Everage, Ozzy Osbourne and Jerry Springer (by video).
3	"Chris Tarrant: A Comedy Roast"	9 April 2010
Television presenter Chris Tarrant is roasted by Jack Dee, Sean Lock, Paddy McGuinness, Mark Durden-Smith, Jamie Theakston, Sally James, Mark Watson and Sir Terry Wogan (by video).
4	"Davina McCall: A Comedy Roast"	15 October 2010
Television presenter Davina McCall is roasted by Rich Hall, Patrick Kielty, Ed Byrne, Jack Whitehall, Chris Moyles, Brian Dowling, and Dermot O'Leary (by video).
5	"Barbara Windsor: A Comedy Roast"	5 January 2011
Actress Barbara Windsor is roasted by Alan Carr, Sean Lock, Rich Hall, Patrick Kielty, Bernard Cribbins, Cheryl Fergison, Christopher Biggins, Michael Sheen and Leslie Phillips.
