= Highfield School =

Highfield School may refer to:

- The Highfield School, a secondary school in Letchworth in Hertfordshire, England
- Highfield School, an independent preparatory school in Liphook in Hampshire, England
- Highfield School, Chatham, Kent, England, a co-educational secondary school closed in 1990, pupils transferring to the newly established Thomas Aveling School
- Highfield School for Boys, an independent preparatory school in Hamilton, Ontario, Canada, now merged with other schools to form Hillfield Strathallan College
