= John Noel (producer) =

British record producer

John Noel, originally John Noel Linnen, is a British executive producer and theatrical agent. He began his career in radio and music management before moving into television in the early 1990s. He established John Noel Management in 1977.

Noel is mostly known for being the producer of Bo' Selecta! and mainly works with Ben Palmer. He also manages Russell Brand, who credits Noel with saving his life by forcing him to go into drug rehabilitation.

== Filmography ==
- Whatever I Want (2000)
- Bo' Selecta! (2003)
- Keith Lemon's Very Brilliant World Tour (2008)
