= Misery Bear =

- Misery Bear
- First appearance: October 2009

In-universe information
- Alias: Mr. M. Bear
- Species: Teddy Bear
- Gender: Male
- Occupation: Clerk, Poet, Writer, Internet Personality
- Nationality: English
- Website: http://www.miserybear.com/home.html

Misery Bear is the subject of a series of short films made by Roughcut TV and published on the BBC website. The films centre on the depressing existence of the title character and his lack of success in work, lack of a girlfriend, or any real friends at all and his excessive drinking. In the films it appears that Jack Daniel's is often his drink of choice, but he's also seen on film drinking from cans of beer and wine.

The first 'Misery Bear' episode titled 'Trip to London' was released in October 2009. To date there have been 14 films in all. In March 2011 a Special Misery Bear film was made for Comic Relief guest starring Kate Moss, who initially befriends Misery Bear. They get steadily more and more drunk until Moss reveals her shrine to Misery Bear and it is clear her intention is to kidnap him. In conjunction with the film, a fundraising page was created for people to donate to Misery Bear's cause. In March 2012 another charity video was released for Sport Relief guest starring Mo Farah, Lionel Richie and Chris Kendall (a.k.a. crabstickz). In 2011 it was announced that Misery Bear would be appearing in a book called Misery Bear's Guide to Love and Heartbreak. The book was released in October 2011 containing his thoughts, stories, poems, photos, cartoons, diary entries, recipes and illustrations. In November 2012, he appeared with Pudsey Bear and Geri Halliwell in a sketch for Children in Need.

== Awards ==
- "Best Internet Viral Show" – 2012 Loaded Lafta Awards
