= Jimmy Carr =

British and Irish comedian (born 1972)

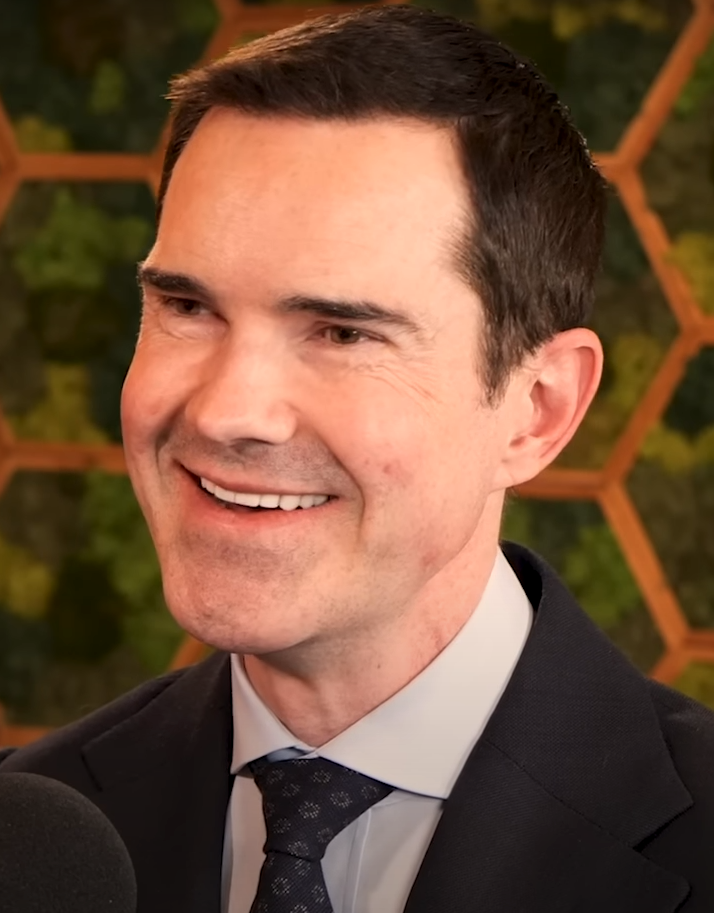
- Carr in 2024
- Born: James Anthony Patrick Carr; 15 September 1972 (age 54); Isleworth, London, England
- Citizenship: Ireland; United Kingdom
- Education: Gonville and Caius College, Cambridge (BA)
- Partner: Karoline Copping (2001–present)
- Children: 1

Comedy career
- Years active: 1997–present
- Medium: Stand-up; television
- Genres: Black comedy; blue comedy; satire
- Subjects: Celebrities; current events; politics; sex
- Website: jimmycarr.com

James Anthony Patrick Carr (born 15 September 1972) is a British and Irish comedian, presenter and writer. He is known for his rapid-fire deadpan delivery of one-liners and edgy, often controversial sense of dark humour. Carr began his comedy career in the late 1990s and rose to prominence for hosting the Channel 4 panel shows The Big Fat Quiz of the Year (2004–present), 8 Out of 10 Cats (2005–2021), and 8 Out of 10 Cats Does Countdown (2012–present). Alongside his television work, he has established a successful career as a touring stand-up comedian, performing internationally.

== Early life and education ==
James Anthony Patrick Carr was born on 15 September 1972 in Isleworth, London. He is the second of three sons born to Irish parents, Nora Mary (née Lawlor; 19 September 1943 – 7 September 2001) and Patrick James "Jim" Carr (born 1945). Carr's father was an accountant and later became treasurer for computer company Unisys. Natives of Limerick, his parents were married in 1970 and separated in 1994, never divorcing.

Carr spent most of his early life in the Buckinghamshire village of Farnham Common, where he attended Farnham Common School and Burnham Grammar School. Carr was diagnosed with dyslexia and could not read or write at his expected level until around ten or eleven years old. He completed sixth form at the Royal Grammar School in High Wycombe.

After earning four A grades at A-level, Carr studied social science and political science at Gonville and Caius College, Cambridge, graduating with first-class honours in 1994. He went on to work in the marketing department at Shell, but took voluntary redundancy in January 2000 as he felt "miserable" there. He performed his first paid stand-up gig later that month. He said a course in neuro-linguistic programming helped him realise his mind was working to hold him back from following his dreams of becoming a comedian.

== Career ==
=== Television ===
==== Hosting ====
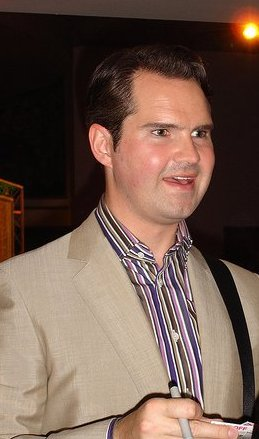
Carr in 2007

Carr began his TV hosting career in the early 2000s, hosting Channel 4 game shows like Distraction and Your Face or Mine?. He presented several episodes of 100 Greatest, including "100 Worst Pop Records", "100 Worst Britons", "100 People Who Look Most Like Jimmy Carr" (a spoof) and "100 Scary Moments".

Beginning in 2005, Carr presented the comedy panel show 8 Out of 10 Cats. The show aired on Channel 4 until 2016, when it moved to More4 and later went to E4. Since 2012, Carr has also presented over 150 episodes of 8 Out of 10 Cats Does Countdown, a combination of his panel show 8 Out of 10 Cats and daytime quiz show Countdown.

In April 2010, Carr hosted the first British version of a comedy roast show, Channel 4's A Comedy Roast. On 6 May 2010, he was a co-host of Channel 4's Alternative Election Night, with David Mitchell, Lauren Laverne and Charlie Brooker. He joined the three presenters again for 10 O'Clock Live, a Channel 4 comedy current-affairs show, which started airing in January 2011.

In 2014 and 2015, Carr guest-presented two episodes of Sunday Night at the Palladium on ITV. In 2018, he presented American comedy panel show The Fix on Netflix. From 2018 to 2020, Carr hosted the Comedy Central series Roast Battle. Since 2021, he has hosted the Channel 4 quiz show I Literally Just Told You.

In March 2025, he hosted the first series of LOL: Last One Laughing UK with Roisin Conaty. In October 2025, Carr hosted the first series of Am I The A**hole? with GK Barry and Jamali Maddix on Comedy Central.

==== Guest appearances ====
Carr contributed sketches to Channel 4 topical comedy TV programme The 11 O'Clock Show and has appeared on panel shows A League of Their Own and QI. During a guest appearance on the BBC motoring show Top Gear, Carr set a new celebrity test track lap record on the 'Star in a Reasonably Priced Car' segment. He was described as "the worst driver we've ever had" and "the luckiest man alive" by Top Gear's test driver the Stig.

Carr has appeared as a contestant on celebrity editions of Deal or No Deal (won £750 for Helen & Douglas House), The Chase (won £1,000 for Variety Club), Benchmark (won £1,000 for Elton John AIDS Foundation), Tipping Point (won £7,000 for Blue Cross), Catchphrase, and Who Wants to Be a Millionaire, winning £1,000.

Carr was a guest presenter for one edition of Have I Got News for You; in 2007 he joined Ian Hislop's team in the edition of the show chaired by Ann Widdecombe, with whom he "flirted" outrageously. Later in the episode, Widdecombe said: "I don't think I shall return to this programme."

==== US appearances ====
Conan O'Brien was an early supporter of Carr's career, with Carr appearing on Late Night with Conan O'Brien twice in 2002, twice in 2006, and again every year between 2007 and 2009 (the last appearance being on The Tonight Show with Conan O'Brien). Carr continued to appear on American late night, appearing on The Tonight Show with Jay Leno in 2003 and 2005; The Tonight Show with Jimmy Fallon in 2016, 2018, 2019, and 2024; and on The Late Late Show with James Corden in 2016.

Carr's first venture into producing TV in the US was the joint UK–US–Canada production,The Strategic Humour Initiative (hosted by Sir David Frost) in 2003. Carr was chosen as the UK comedian. Only one episode was made.

In 2005, Carr hosted 12 episodes of the American version of the shock gameshow Distraction, as he had hosted the original UK version. A second US series (14 episodes) was commissioned in 2006. Comedy Central (US) also made two episodes of Comedy Central Presents: Jimmy Carr in 2005 and 2009.

In 2015, Carr was the first British comedian to have a Netflix stand-up special with his show Funny Business. Netflix produced 10 episodes of The Fix in 2018 hosted by Carr. It was an attempt to export the UK panel show format to America. Although still available on Netflix, no further episodes have been made.

=== Radio ===
In January 2006, Carr made a joke on Radio 4's Loose Ends, the punchline of which implied that Gypsy women stank. The BBC issued an apology, but Carr refused to apologize and continued to use the joke. He appeared in two episodes of the radio series of Flight of the Conchords in 2005.

Carr has appeared on BBC Radio 4's The Museum of Curiosity a total of seven times since 2011. He was the Museum Curator (in his five appearances in 2012) and a guest on the 2018 Annual Stock Take Christmas special, alongside Lee Mack, Jo Brand, and Sally Philips.

=== Podcasts ===
Carr's podcast appearances go back to at least 2010 with a one-off podcast called Jimmy Carr and Frankie Boyle: Meet the Comedians. Carr's podcast appearances ramped up significantly during the height of the COVID-19 pandemic, with appearances during this period including The Betoota Advocate Podcast, You Made It Weird with Pete Holmes, The Comedian's Comedian, The Jordan B. Peterson Podcast, and Dane Baptiste Questions Everything.

=== Stand-up comedy ===
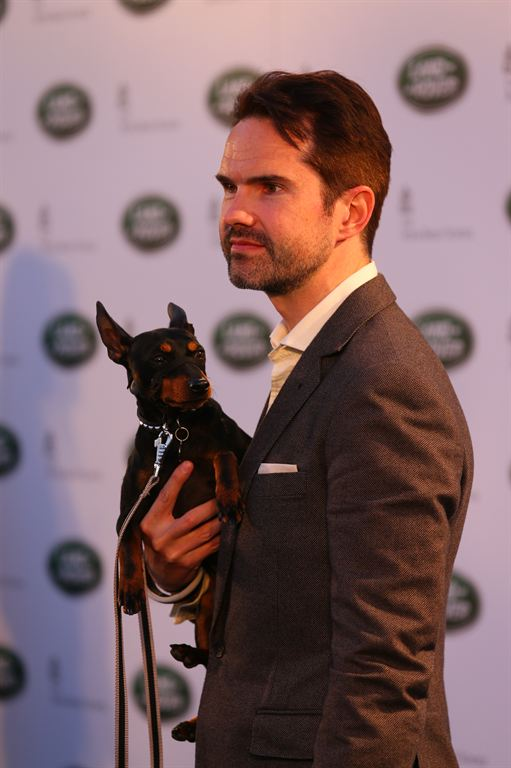
Carr in 2012

Though often recognized for his TV appearances, Carr primarily considers himself a stand-up comedian, saying on a July 2018 episode of Peter McGraw's podcast, "I’ve always thought I’m in stand-up and everything else is a little bit of a side show."

Carr performed his first five minutes of stand-up, unpaid, at an Islington pub called the Tut 'n' Shive in December 1999. From 2000 to 2003, he started appearing regularly around London at clubs like Up The Creek, The Banana Cabaret, and The Bearcat Comedy Club. In 2003, he was listed in The Observer as one of the 50 funniest acts in British comedy.

He toured the country with his show A Public Display of Affection, starting on 9 April 2005 at the Gulbenkian Theatre in Canterbury and ending on 14 January 2006 at the Gielgud Theatre in London's West End. He also appeared at the EICC during the Edinburgh Festival in August 2005 with his Off The Telly show.

In August 2006, he commenced the tour Gag Reflex, for which he won the 2006 British Comedy Award for "Best Live Stand-Up". He released his third DVD, Jimmy Carr: Comedian, in November 2007.

In 2007, in a poll on the Channel 4 website for 100 Greatest Stand-Ups, Jimmy Carr was ranked 12th. A national tour, titled Repeat Offender, commenced in autumn 2007, beginning at the Edinburgh Festival. On 3 February 2007, Carr's performance in front of 50 people in London was broadcast simultaneously on the virtual platform Second Life.

His Rapier Wit tour opened on 20 August 2009 with eight shows at the Edinburgh Festival before touring the UK. He released a DVD entitled Jimmy Carr: Telling Jokes on 2 November 2009. Also on 5 and 6 July 2009, Carr was the warm-up act for band The Killers at performances recorded for their DVD album, Live from the Royal Albert Hall.

Carr's sixth live DVD, Jimmy Carr: Making People Laugh, was released on 8 November 2010. Carr's 2010–11 tour, entitled Laughter Therapy, started with a run at the Edinburgh Festival before touring the UK.

A Guardian profile in 2012 called Carr "one of the nation's most popular stand-up comedians... in his ability to pull in crowds which generate millions in tour and DVD sales..." and "the undisputed king of deadpan one-liners". Carr released the Jimmy Carr: Laughing and Joking DVD on 18 November 2013.

Carr has also frequently collaborated with American comedians. Since 2015, Carr has made several appearances on the US live comedy show Kill Tony. Neal Brennan credits him with the idea for his Blocks podcast, and Jeffery Ross frequently invites him to be part of his Roast events (including The Roast of Rob Lowe).

Carr has been performing at The Comedy Store in Los Angeles for many years and is one of a small number of British comedians that are listed as alumni. In 2018, he was given the honour of having his name painted on one of the club's walls.

Carr is a frequent Netflix collaborator and has praised Netflix for ushering in a "Golden Age" of comedy where "people can reach a bigger market". Across two nights of the 2022 Netflix is a Joke Festival, Carr was a support act for Dave Chappelle at the Hollywood Bowl (30 April and 3 May 2022, the show where Chappelle was attacked on stage). During the festival, Carr performed for his own tour at the Palace Theatre, and also performed at the Hollywood Palladium as a part of the line-up for Bill Burr Presents Friends Who Kill, which was filmed for another Netflix Special. Carr was also invited to a celebratory brunch at the home of Netflix co-CEO, Ted Sarandos.

During his Terribly Funny tour (which began pre-COVID lockdown and ended April 2024) Carr wrote material for his next tour by trying out new material in every gig. He announced his next tour, Jimmy Carr: Laughs Funny, in October 2023.

On 17 April 2024, the Netflix recording of Carr's Terribly Funny 2.0 tour was released as Natural Born Killer. In the week 15–21 April 2024, Netflix listed the show as being 8th in the global Top 10 (in the category TV, English) with 2.3 million viewing hours. Natural Born Killer received mixed reviews, with a 42% rating on Rotten Tomatoes and The Spectator calling it "not especially funny," with material not "refreshingly transgressive so much as gratuitously unpleasant".

Carr posted on X (formerly Twitter) that he had performed two gigs in the UK on 3 May before traveling to Los Angeles for the 2024 Netflix is a Joke festival. He then performed at the Outside Joke event, at the Hollywood Palladium in Los Angeles, on 4 May. On 5 May 2024, Carr attended the Netflix special live stream of The Roast of Tom Brady. In the final months of his Terribly Funny 2.0 tour, Carr made several trips to the US, criss-crossing the country each time. He also toured in March and April 2024; the last trip ended up consisting of new material under the tour name Laughs Funny.

The title of Jimmy Carr: Laughs Funny refers to Carr's signature laugh, or "world-famous honk". As of 2026, the tour is still ongoing and has received mixed reviews; The Times called Carr's signature offensive material "a bit tedious" but "sometimes enlightening", while conservative newspaper The Telegraph labeled the show's commentary on what it calls gender ideology "refreshingly naughty" (with references to "gender fluid" and "trans fats") but containing "more filler".

In September and October 2024, Carr joined Australian comedian Jim Jefferies for a number of joint gigs in Canada, slotted between dates for Jefferies's own tour. Their shows were billed as The Charm Offensive Tour.

==== Edinburgh Festival Fringe ====
The Edinburgh Festival Fringe is an annual arts festival in Scotland which has been a showcase for comedians since at least the 1970s. Carr has often said how important the festival is to anyone who wants to get into comedy, remarking that he is "a performer at night but during the day I'm a punter and have conversations with people about what show they liked and what they didn't."

Carr has said that he first went to Edinburgh around 2000. Although he would eventually return each year as a paid stand-up comic, he initially had to save money by sleeping in his Rover 75 or on the floor of a rental shared by other comedians.

He performed a revue at the Café Royal as a part of the 2001 Edinburgh Fringe. Titled Rubbernecker, it also featured Ricky Gervais, Stephen Merchant and Robin Ince. The two-week stint with Rubbernecker was Carr's first Fringe appearance with his name in the official programme and his first mention on the comedy site Chortle.

In 2002, Carr performed his first Fringe solo show, Bare Faced Ambition, in the dining room of the Gilded Balloon. He was nominated for what was then known as the Perrier Award. The poster and programme billed him as "England's answer to Emo Philips".

By his 2003 appearance, the now 30-year-old Carr had built a larger fan base through touring, several appearances at Montreal's Just For Laughs and numerous TV appearances (including co-hosting Your Face or Mine?). This moved his shows to the larger venue of the Pleasance Courtyard, but the festival's rules on TV appearances meant he was now judged to be a "star" and therefore could not be nominated for the 2003 Perrier Award. He performed for 25 nights from 30 July to 25 August 2003. On 21 and 22 August he participated in Comedy Gala 2003 in aid of Waverley Care, a Scotland-based charity for HIV and Hepatitis C care.

Edinburgh 2004 followed another of Carr's appearances as TV host (Distraction); this tour show was called Public Display of Affection. This meant another move up in venue size with six shows at the Edinburgh International Conference Centre (EICC) which had a 1,200-seat capacity at that time.

The 2005 Fringe was Carr's fifth, where he again presented all-new material. The show was called Off The Telly and he performed eight shows at the EICC. In 2006, Carr tried out material for a new tour called Gag Reflex, performing a "WIP" (work in progress) show at the Hen and Chickens Theatre on 5 August 2006. He continued trying the new material across six nights at the EICC from 17 August.

Carr only made a brief appearance at the 2007 Fringe on 21 August. He performed at Edinburgh Festival Theatre in a regular Fringe fundraiser headed by Alan Carr, in support of Waverley Care. He was still writing material for his planned Repeat Offender tour, carrying a clipboard on stage. While previous Guardian coverage of headlining comedians had been reasonably positive, articles from 2007 questioned the "commercialism" of the festival's focus on "big-name performers familiar from TV", declaring that "household names were drowning out more pioneering art".

While the 2008 Edinburgh programme never listed dates or a venue for Carr's shows, his presence was mentioned in The Independent and Chortle, and he was said to have unveiled his Joke Technician tour. Edinburgh 2009 saw Carr return with his "eighth solo show" (with 2008 being his seventh). He performed his new show, Rapier Wit, for eight nights spanning 20 to 30 August at the EICC. During this week he also attended the Edinburgh International Television Festival, appearing as a judge on a Britain's Got Talent spoof called "TV's Got Talent" alongside Amanda Holden and Louis Walsh.

Edinburgh 2010 saw Carr debut his new show, Laughter Therapy, a few days after the end of his Rapier Wit tour. He was back at the EICC for eight nights. Carr missed the 2011 Edinburgh festival but returned in 2012 to perform his new show, Gagging Order, with six nights at the EICC. 2014 saw Carr return for his 11th solo Edinburgh show titled Funny Business. He was based once again at the EICC for four nights in what appeared at the time to be his last Fringe performance as a comedian.

In August 2017, Carr returned for a different kind of Edinburgh Festival: the Edinburgh International Television Festival. He interviewed Comedy Central President, Kent Alterman, in an on-stage Q&A session in front of industry staff.

After a 10-year absence, Carr returned to the Fringe in August 2024 for his 12th solo show, Laughs Funny. He described the Festival as being "where it all began" and performed five shows across three nights at the Edinburgh Playhouse.

=== Controversy and criticism ===
In 2004, Carr threatened to sue Jim Davidson for using a joke that Carr considered his own. The matter was dropped when it became apparent that the joke in question was an old one used for decades by many different comedians.

In October 2009, Carr received criticism from Sunday tabloid newspapers for a joke he made about British soldiers who had lost limbs in Iraq and Afghanistan. He had met staff and patients at the rehabilitation centre Headley Court in March 2009. At the end of a set at the Manchester Apollo, Carr said, "You can say what you like about these servicemen amputees from Iraq and Afghanistan," following up with, "but we're going to have a fucking good Paralympics team in 2012."

Members of parliament condemned the joke while media outlets reported on outraged reactions from mothers of injured soldiers. Carr released a statement reading "I’ve got nothing but respect for the young men and women who put their lives on the line for this country", continuing, "I’m sorry if anyone was offended but that’s the kind of comedy I do." He later defended his own joke as "totally acceptable" in an interview with The Guardian.

Carr was also criticised in November 2011 for a joke about the Variety Club's Sunshine Coaches, which provide accessible transportation for disabled children. The charity and Down Syndrome Education International condemned the joke. Carr defended himself by saying nothing should be off limits.

In June 2019, Carr was criticised for the content of his touring show Terribly Funny. Among the controversial jokes were jokes about dwarves, fat women and female genital mutilation. Carr was also criticised by charity Little People UK (co-founded by actor Warwick Davis), accusing him of prejudice for an "offensive" abortion joke he made about people with dwarfism.

In a stand-up comedy performance released as a Christmas 2021 Netflix special titled His Dark Material, Carr joked:

When people talk about the Holocaust, they talk about the tragedy and horror of 6 million Jewish lives being lost to the Nazi war machine. But they never mention the thousands of Gypsies that were killed by the Nazis. No one ever wants to talk about that, because no one ever wants to talk about the positives.

During the show, Carr said the joke was meant to raise awareness of Romani victims of the Holocaust. The joke later received widespread attention the following February after a clip was posted and shared online. He was condemned by the Auschwitz Memorial, Hope not Hate and The Traveller Movement, who called anti-Romani prejudice the "last acceptable form of racism" in the UK. He also faced criticism from British politicians, including Prime Minister Boris Johnson and Nadine Dorries, the culture secretary. The Holocaust Memorial Day Trust said they were "absolutely appalled" and "horrified", and they described Carr's joke as "abhorrent". Despite the criticism, Carr stood by the joke.

In May 2025, Carr hosted a secret event celebrating Israel's Independence Day at the British Museum. This event was held during the Israel–Gaza war and was criticised by pro-Palestine activists, who urge a boycott of Israeli events.

In 2025, Carr performed at the Riyadh Comedy Festival. The event was criticised by Human Rights Watch and Amnesty International as an attempt to whitewash human rights abuses committed in Saudi Arabia. Comedians who played at the festival faced backlash from journalists and fellow artists for participating. Carr defended his performance at the festival, stating: "I played it. I loved it. I think we need to give up on the idea that the Middle East becomes Western Europe."

==== Tax avoidance ====
In June 2012, Carr's involvement in an alleged K2 tax avoidance scheme came to light after an investigation by The Times. The scheme is understood to involve UK earners "quitting" their job and signing new employment contracts with offshore shell companies based in the low-tax jurisdiction of Jersey. Prime Minister David Cameron said: "People work hard, they pay their taxes, they save up to go to one of his shows. They buy the tickets. He is taking the money from those tickets and he, as far as I can see, is putting all of that into some very dodgy tax-avoiding schemes." Carr subsequently pulled out of the scheme, apologising for "a terrible error of judgement".

Viewing figures of the episode of his topical show 8 out of 10 Cats, recorded on the day of his apology and broadcast the following day, almost doubled compared with the previous week. Earlier in 2012, during the second series of Channel 4's satirical news programme 10 O'Clock Live, Carr had lampooned people who avoid paying their taxes. A sketch from the show, in which he poked fun at the 1% tax rate of Barclays Bank and described tax lawyers as being "aggressive" and "amoral", was regarded as having "come back to haunt him".

In February 2018, Carr appeared on Room 101, a BBC comedy series, where he talked about the controversy. Though he admitted that what he did was wrong, he said there was some level of hypocrisy in the comments that Cameron had made about him in 2012, stating that members of Cameron's family and Queen Elizabeth II had subsequently been mentioned in the Panama Papers and Paradise Papers tax evasion scandals. Carr said that the law should become clearer by eliminating any loopholes, instead of leaving it up to individuals to decide what is morally right. Carr continues to reference the scandal in his performances and public appearances and takes heckles on the subject with good humour, including responding to a heckle on the subject by saying: "There's two shows: One at 7, one at 9:30. One for me, one for them."

=== Charities ===
Carr is a supporter of the Bob Woodruff Foundation (a non-profit that supports post-9/11-impacted service members, veterans, and their families). On 5 November 2018, he was on the bill of the 12th Annual Stand Up for Heroes event at Madison Square Garden and again, for the 17th event, on 6 November 2023, at the Lincoln Center.

Carr was one of the British comics supporting Amnesty International at the 2012 Secret Policeman's Ball in New York.

== Personal life ==
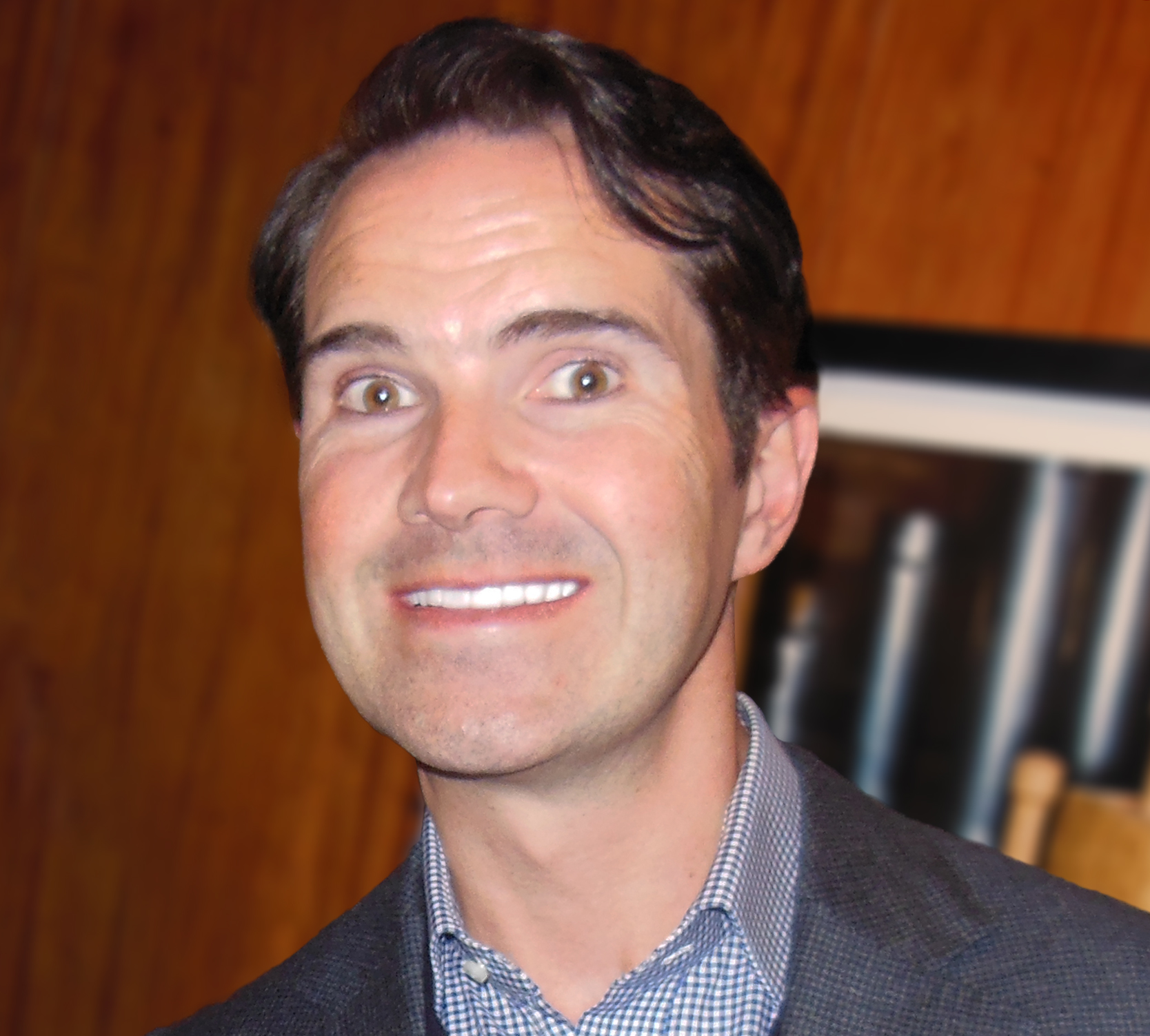
Carr in 2015

In 1998, Carr, aged 26 at the time, recalled having "an early midlife crisis" during which he lost his Catholic faith. He has since made comments critical of organised religion. In 2015, he said about his faith:

As for being a Christian, yes, it seems ridiculous now, but I genuinely believed there was a big man in the sky who could grant wishes. Writers like Christopher Hitchens and Richard Dawkins helped change my view, but I don't go on stage banging on about being an atheist... I'm just a guy who tells jokes.

Carr has stated that he underwent a lot of therapy, specifically neuro-linguistic programming, at the time of his crisis in order to help him cope with his loss of faith, and that he is qualified as a therapist.

In 2001, Carr's mother Nora Mary died of pancreatitis at age 57. Following her death, Carr's relationship with his father became "severely strained". In 2004 his father was arrested and accused of harassing Carr and his brother Colin, but was cleared and won an apology from the Metropolitan Police. In 2021, Carr said he had not spoken to his father since 2000 and had not seen him in person, with the exception of an autograph signing after a gig in 2015, where they saw each other but did not speak.

Carr has dual British and Irish citizenship and travels on an Irish passport. He has spoken of his pride in having Irish ancestry and was presented in 2013 with a certificate of Irish heritage in his parents' home city of Limerick by the city's mayor.

Carr's partner is Karoline Copping, a Canadian who is a commissioning editor for Channel 5, with whom he has been in a relationship since 2001. Their son was born in 2019.

== Awards ==
- Time Out Award: Best Stand-Up (2002)
- Perrier Award Nomination (2002)
- Royal Television Society Award: Best On-Screen Newcomer (2003)
- Lafta Award: Best Stand-Up (2004)
- Rose D'Or Nomination: Best Presenter, Distraction (2004)
- Lafta Award: Funniest Man (2005)
- British Comedy Award: Best Live Stand-Up (2006)
- Lafta Award: Funniest Man (2007)
- Lafta Award: Best Stand-Up (2008)
- Lafta Award: Loaded Legend (2011)

== Stand-up shows ==
Title	Years
Charm Offensive	2003–2004
A Public Display of Affection	2004–2006
Gag Reflex	2006–2007
Repeat Offender	2007–2008
Joke Technician	2008–2009
Rapier Wit	2009–2010
Laughter Therapy	2010–2011
Gagging Order	2012–2013
Funny Business	2014–2015
The Best Of, Ultimate, Gold, Greatest Hits Tour	2016–2018
Terribly Funny	2019–2021
Terribly Funny 2.0	2022–2024
Laughs Funny	2024–2026

=== DVD releases / Netflix specials ===
Title	Released	Notes
Live	8 November 2004	Live at London's Bloomsbury Theatre
Stand Up	7 November 2005	Live at London's Bloomsbury Theatre
Comedian	5 November 2007	Live at London's Bloomsbury Theatre
In Concert	3 November 2008	Live at London's Bloomsbury Theatre
Telling Jokes	2 November 2009	Live at London's Bloomsbury Theatre
Making People Laugh	8 November 2010	Live at Glasgow's Clyde Auditorium
Being Funny	21 November 2011	Live at Birmingham's Symphony Hall
Laughing and Joking	18 November 2013	Live at London's Hammersmith Apollo
Funny Business	18 March 2016	Netflix special Live at London's Hammersmith Apollo
The Best Of, Ultimate, Gold, Greatest Hits	12 March 2019	Netflix special Live at Dublin's Olympia Theatre
His Dark Material	25 December 2021	Netflix special Live at Southend-on-Sea's Cliffs Pavilion
Natural Born Killer	16 April 2024	Netflix special Live at Aylesbury Waterside

== Filmography ==
=== Film ===
Year	Title	Role	Notes
2006	Alien Autopsy	Gary's manager	
2006	Confetti	Antony	
2006	Stormbreaker	John Crawford	
2007	I Want Candy	Video store employee	
2009	Telstar: The Joe Meek Story	Gentleman	
2016	The Comedian's Guide to Survival	Himself	
2025	Fackham Hall	Vicar	Also writer

=== Television ===
Year	Title	Role	Channel
2002–2003, 2017–2019	Your Face or Mine?	Co-presenter	E4 (2002–2003); Comedy Central (2017–2019)
2003–2004	Distraction	Presenter	Channel 4
2003	Have I Got News for You	Guest presenter	BBC One
2003–2010	Have I Got News for You	Panellist	BBC One
2004–present	The Big Fat Quiz of the Year	Presenter	Channel 4
2005	The Friday Night Project	Presenter	Channel 4
2005	The Panel	Panellist	RTÉ Two
2005–2021	8 Out of 10 Cats	Presenter	Channel 4 (2005–2015); More4 (2016–2017); E4 (2017–2021)
2007	Live at the Apollo	Guest presenter (3x02)	BBC One
2008	Commercial Breakdown	Presenter	BBC One
2010	Channel 4's Alternative Election Night	Co-presenter	Channel 4
2010–2011	A Comedy Roast	Presenter	Channel 4
2011–2013	10 O'Clock Live	Co-presenter	Channel 4
2012–present	8 Out of 10 Cats Does Countdown	Presenter	Channel 4
2014, 2015	Sunday Night at the Palladium	Guest presenter	ITV
2015–2017	Drunk History	Narrator	Comedy Central
2016	Comedy Central Roast of Rob Lowe	Himself/roaster	Comedy Central
2018	The Fix	Host	Netflix
2018–2020	Roast Battle	Presenter	Comedy Central
2019	The Inbetweeners Fwends Reunited	Host	Channel 4
2020	Back to the 2010s with Jimmy Carr	Host	Channel 4
2020	Blankety Blank Christmas Special 2020	Participant	BBC One
2021–2022	I Can See Your Voice	Celebrity panellist	BBC One
2021–2024	I Literally Just Told You	Presenter	Channel 4
2022	Jimmy Carr Destroys Art	Presenter	Channel 4
2024	Battle in the Box	Host	Dave
2025	Jimmy Carr's Am I The A**hole?	Host	Comedy Central
2025–present	LOL: Last One Laughing	Host	Amazon Prime Video

==== Guest appearances ====
- QI (2003–2022)
- A League of Their Own (2010–2017)
- Deal or No Deal (2012)
- Was it Something I Said? (2013)
- Through the Keyhole (2014, 2015, 2017)
- Top Gear (2004, 2006, 2013)
- Celebrity Juice (2014–2019)
- Alan Davies: As Yet Untitled (2015, 2017)
- Celebrity Squares (2015)
- Celebrity Benchmark (2015)
- Crackanory (2015)
- Virtually Famous (2016, 2017)
- The Tonight Show Starring Jimmy Fallon (2016, 2025)
- @midnight (2016)
- Chelsea (2016)
- The Chase: Celebrity Special (2012, 2019)
- Tipping Point: Lucky Stars (2016)
- The Grand Tour (2016)
- Play to the Whistle (2017)
- Catchphrase: Celebrity Special (2018)
- Room 101 (2018)
- This Is My House (2021)
- Who Wants to Be a Millionaire? Celebrity Special (2021)

== Books ==
- 2004, Distraction, the Quiz Book: For the Bright, the Bold and the Brave (foreword to the TV tie-in) ISBN 9-781-844425-488
- 2006, with Lucy Greeves, The Naked Jape: Uncovering the Hidden World of Jokes (London: Michael Joseph) ISBN 9-780-718148-713. US title: Only Joking: What's So Funny About Making People Laugh? (New York: Gotham Books) ISBN 9-781-592402-359
- 2020, contributed to Dear NHS: 100 Stories to Say Thank You, edited by Adam Kay ISBN 9-781-398701-182
- 2021, Before & Laughter: A Life-Changing Book ISBN 9-798-469515-678. UK title: 2022, Before & Laughter: The Hilarious Guide to Changing your Life (London: Quercus Publishing) ISBN 9-781-529413-113
- 2026, with Amanda Baker and Abi Grant, On Jokes (or, why everything you know about comedy is wrong). (London: Quercus Publishing, ISBN 9-781-529454-222

== Discography ==
- = (Ed Sheeran, 2021) – backing vocals on "Visiting Hours"

== See also ==
- List of atheists in film, radio, television and theatre
