= Keith Lemon's Very Brilliant World Tour =

- Created by: Leigh Francis
- Developed by: Leigh Francis; Ben Palmer
- Starring: Leigh Francis
- Country of origin: United Kingdom
- Original language: English
- No. of series: 1
- No. of episodes: 6

Production
- Executive producers: Leigh Francis; John Noel
- Production location: Various
- Running time: 30 minutes

Original release
- Network: ITV2
- Release: 11 March – 15 April 2008

Keith Lemon's Very Brilliant World Tour is a travel-style comedy series hosted by Keith Lemon, a character portrayed by comedian Leigh Francis. The series was first announced during an appearance by Lemon on the Big Brother companion show Big Brother's Big Mouth in 2007. The show premiered on 11 March 2008, attracting 565,000 viewers (a 2.2% multi-channel share), and concluded on 15 April 2008.

== Format ==
The series features Lemon travelling around the world on a shark-shaped flight plan, visiting six countries (Australia, Japan, the United States, Egypt, Mexico and Iceland), and meeting various celebrity guests, including: former Spice Girls Mel B and Melanie C, along the way. During the series, Paddy McGuinness played the role of Lemon's cousin Gary.

== Production ==
In May 2008, Francis announced that he would not be filming a second series in the near future, as he would be busy filming his panel show Celebrity Juice commencing in August 2008. The show was released on DVD on 3 November 2008. Francis announced in May 2011 that he would like to write and record a second series, but said he would struggle to find the time to do so.

== Episodes ==
No.	Location	Guest(s)	Original release date
1	United States	Mel B and Mel C	11 March 2008
2	Australia	Stefan Dennis and Holly Valance	18 March 2008
3	Mexico	Holly Willoughby	25 March 2008
4	Egypt	Sharon Osbourne and Samia Smith	1 April 2008
5	Japan	Tamzin Outhwaite	8 April 2008
6	Iceland	Dermot O'Leary	15 April 2008
