= Loaded Lafta Awards =

British annual comedy awards ceremony

- Awarded for: Best of British Comedy
- Location: Sketch, London (2005), Pigalle Club, Piccadilly (2007), Cuckoo Club, London (2009-2012); Sway, London (2013)
- Country: United Kingdom
- Presented by: Max Rushden and Helen Chamberlain (2013); Olivia Lee (2010)
- First award: 2003
- Final award: 2013
- Website: Official website

The Loaded Lafta Awards (from 2003 to 2013) was an annual awards ceremony in the United Kingdom, celebrating notable comedians and entertainment performances from throughout the previous year.

The awards were inaugurated in 2003, Loaded magazine readers would select a favourite from a list of nominees. In 2004, over 20,000 of the magazines followers had voted for these awards. The event lasted for 11 years before being disbanded after the awards of 2013.

== Winners ==
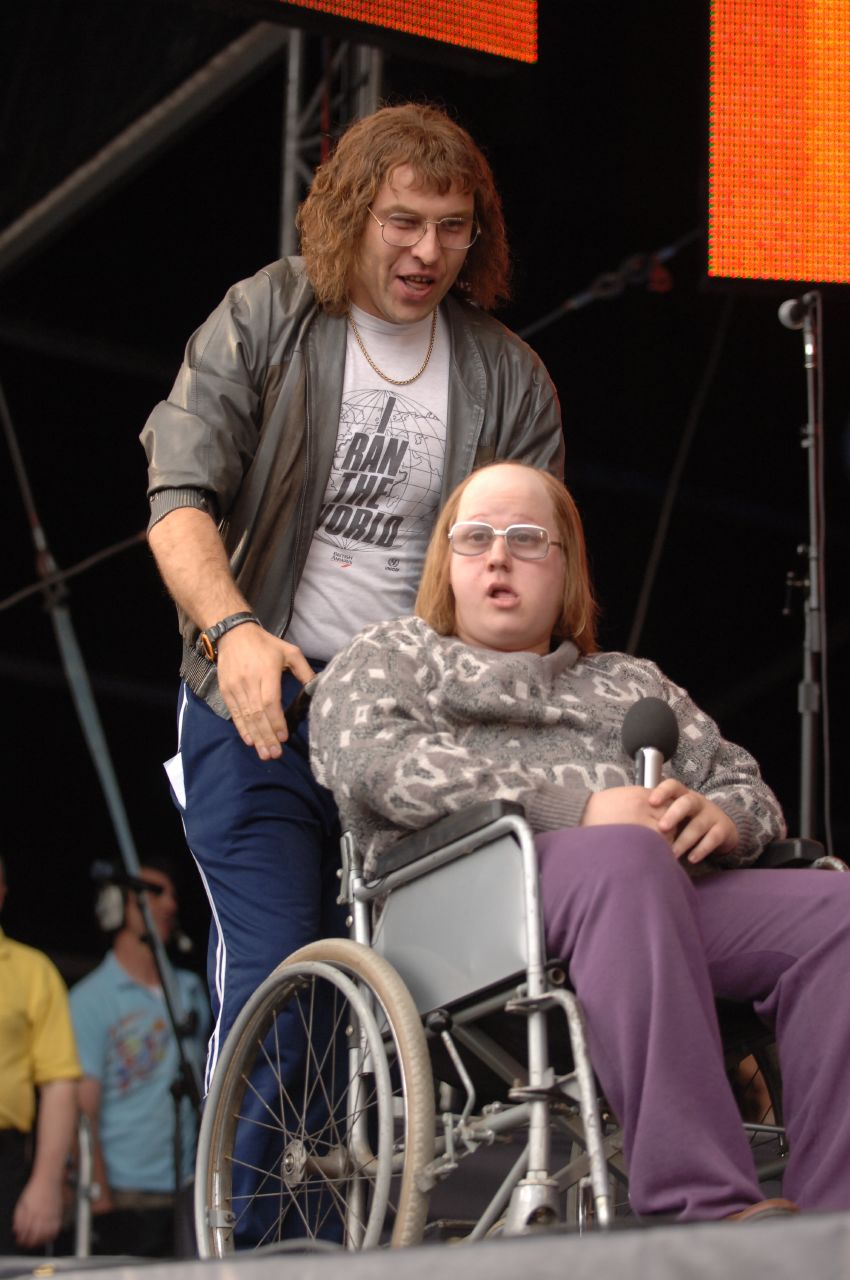
Little Britain - Best Comedy Show 2004

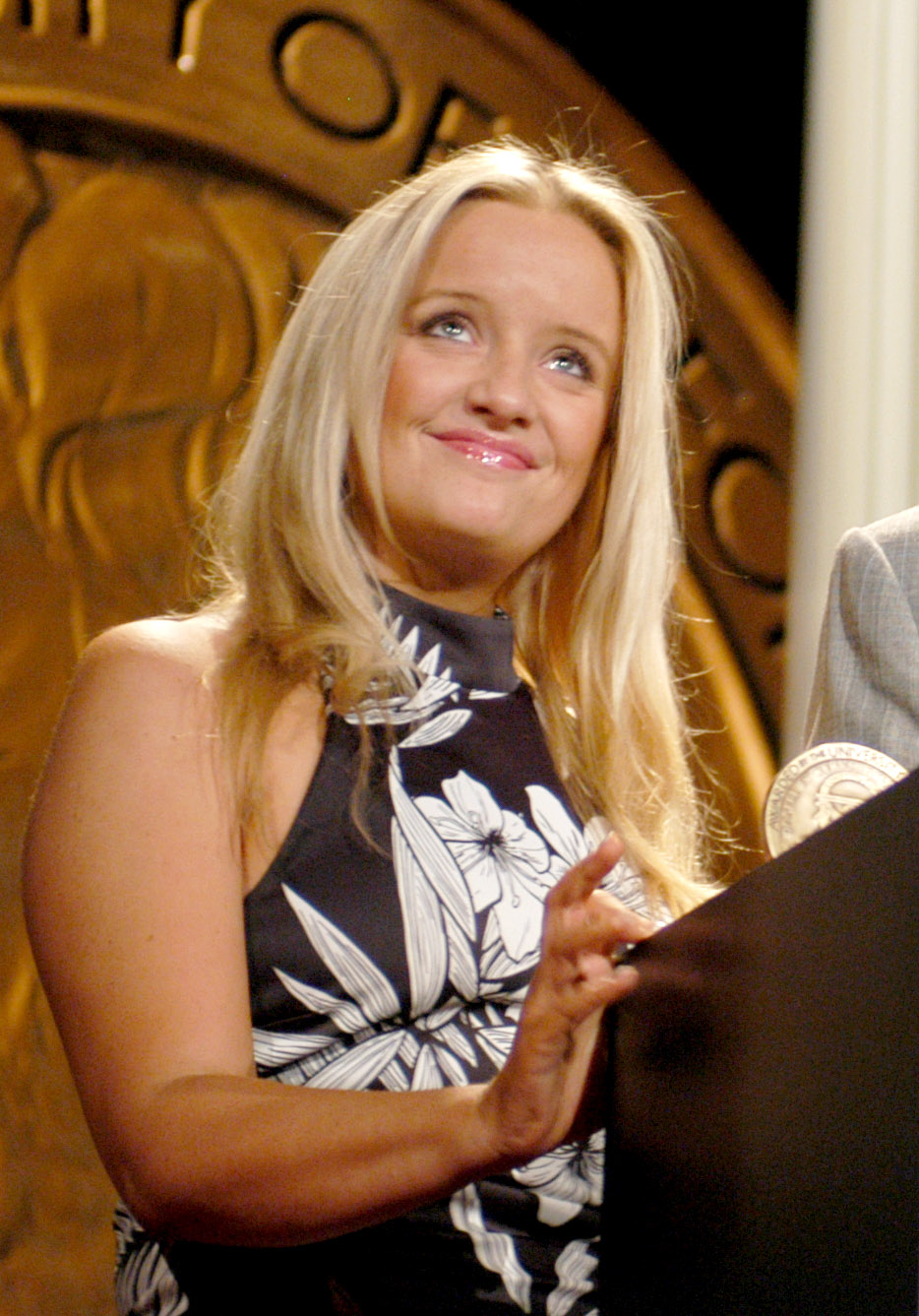
Lucy Davis - Funniest Woman 2004

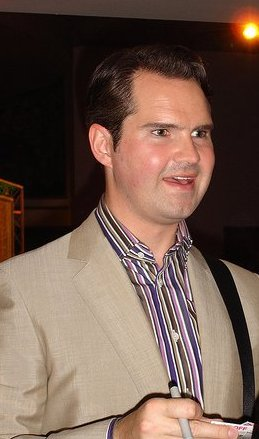
Jimmy Carr - Best Stand-up 2006

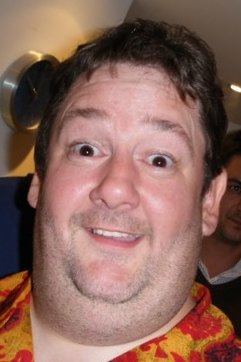
Johnny Vegas - Funniest Man 2006

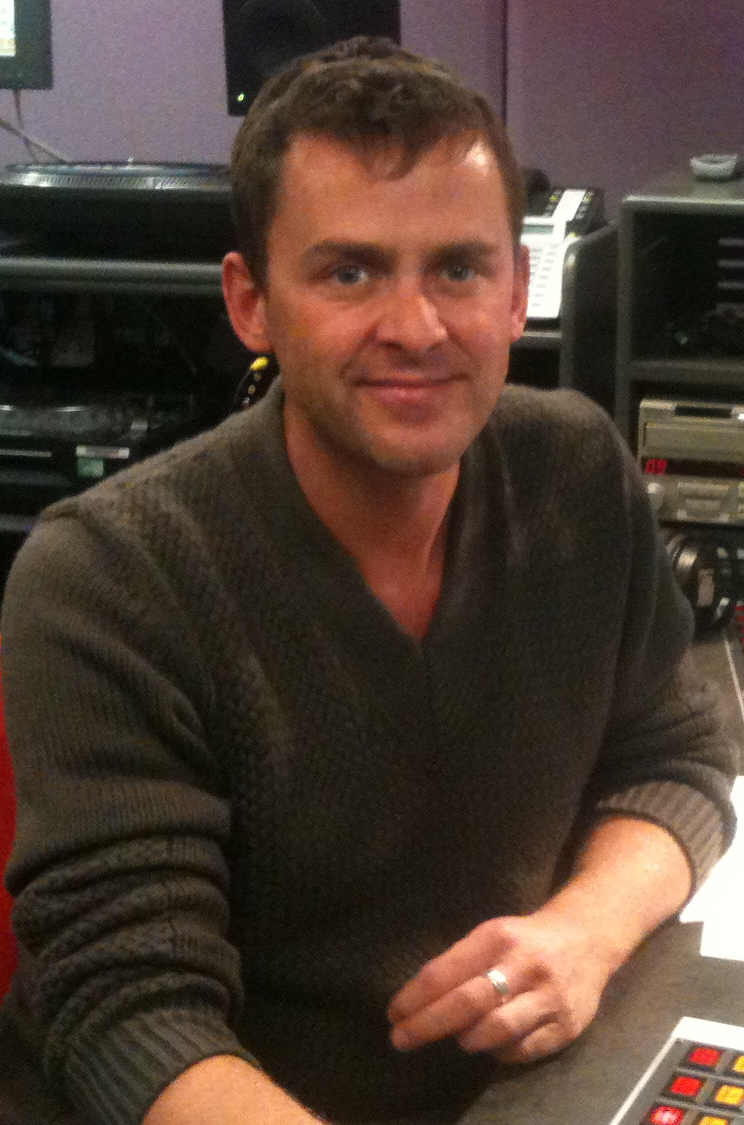
Scott Mills - Funniest Radio Show 2008

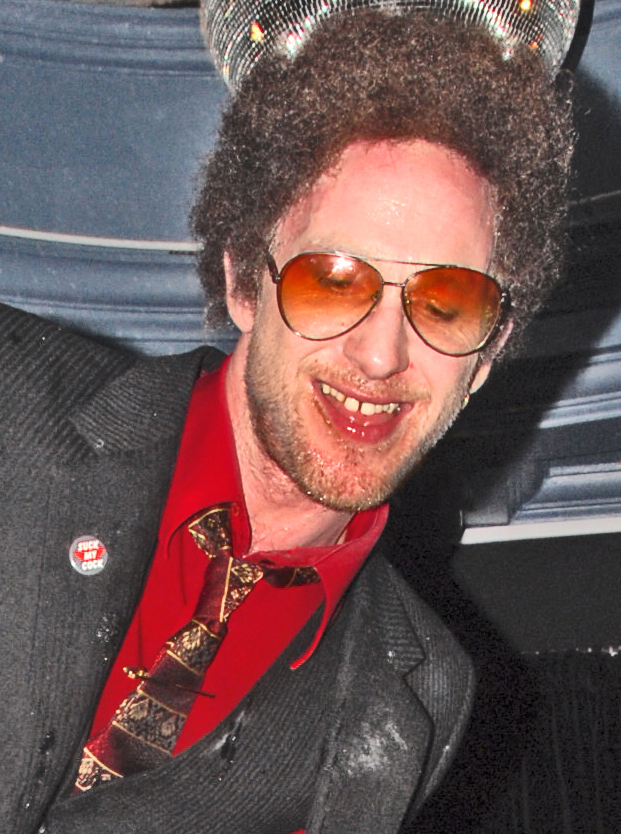
Mike Strutter(Paul Kaye) Funniest TV personality 2008

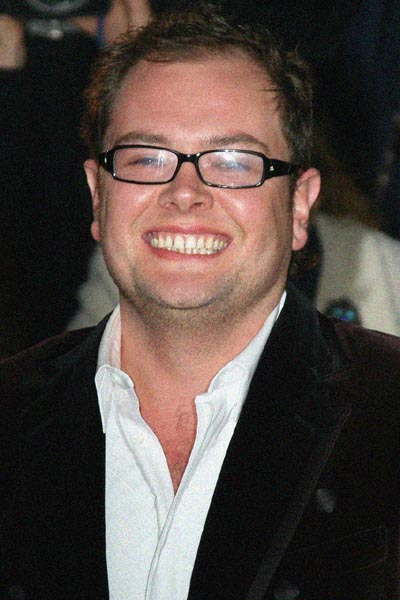
Alan Carr - Funniest Man 2011

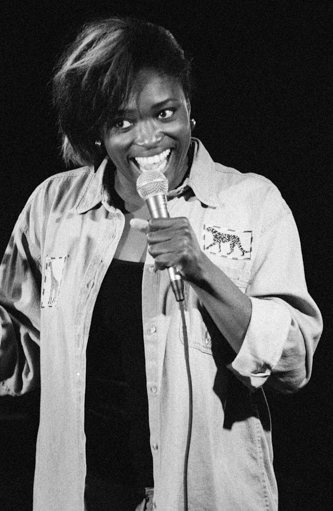
Andi Osho - Funniest Woman 2012

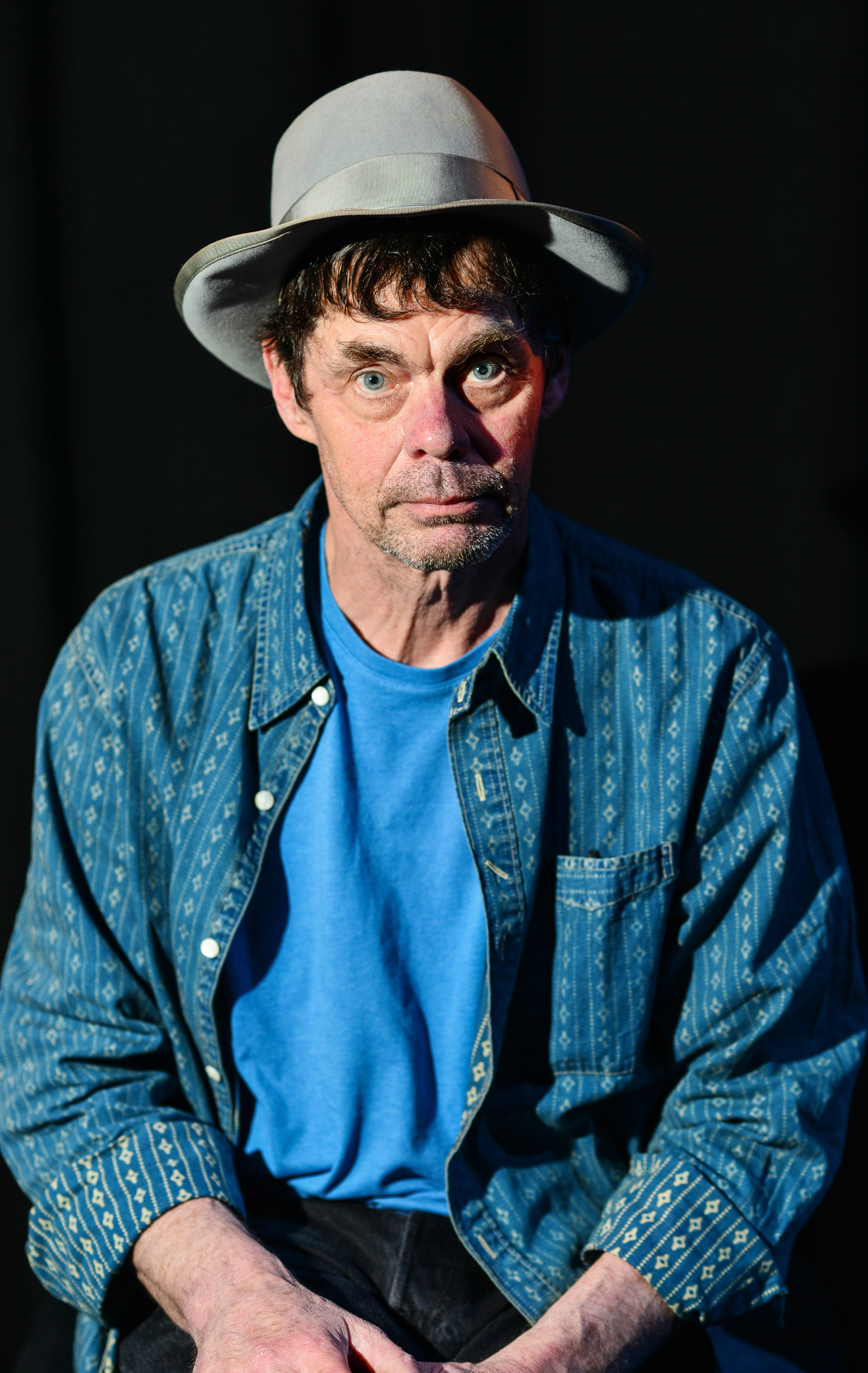
Rich Hall - Stand-up legend 2013

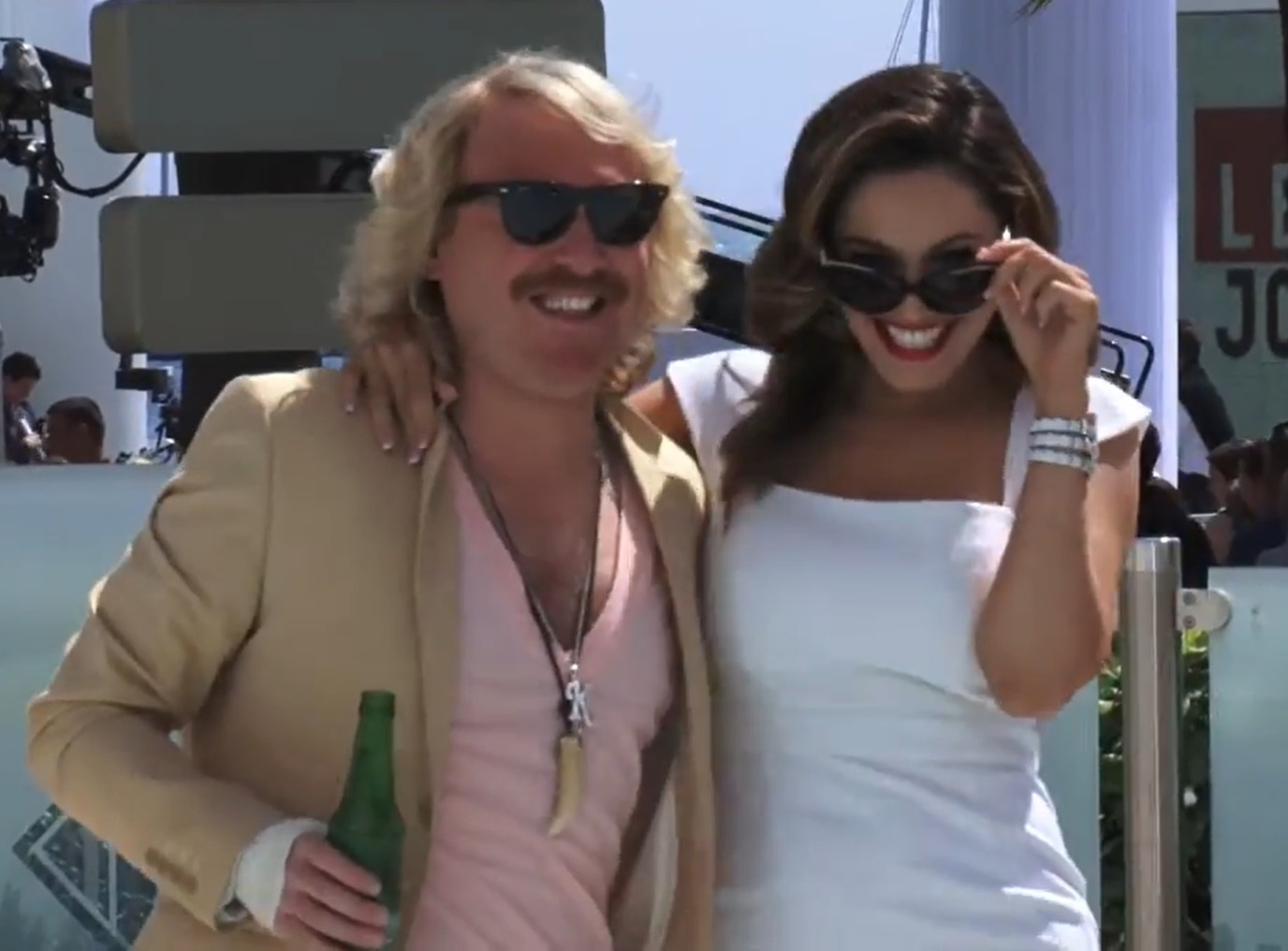
Keith Lemon: The Film - Funniest Film 2013

=== 2003 ===
- Best stand-up: Ross Noble
- Funniest show on TV: Bo' Selecta!
- Funniest man: Avid Merrion (Leigh Francis)
- Funniest radio programme: Chris Moyles
- Best comedy duo: Ant and Dec
- Loaded Legend: Leslie Phillips

=== 2004 ===
- Best double act: David Walliams & Matt Lucas
- Best comedy show: Little Britain
- Best stand up: Jimmy Carr
- Funniest man: Johnny Vegas
- Funniest woman: Lucy Davis
- Funniest film: Shaun of the Dead
- Funniest TV personality: Ant & Dec
- Funniest radio personality: Chris Moyles
- Funniest reality TV person: Victor, Big Brother (series 5)

=== 2005 ===
- Funniest Man of the Year: Jimmy Carr
- Funniest Double Act: David Walliams & Matt Lucas
- Best Comedy on TV: The Smoking Room (BBC Three)
- Funniest DJ: Scott Mills
- Best Stand-up: Lee Mack
- Loaded Legend: Bruce Forsyth

=== 2006 ===
- Funniest TV Show: Friday Night Project
- Funniest Double Act: Justin Lee Collins and Alan Carr
- Best Stand up: Jimmy Carr
- TV Personality: Charlotte Church
- Funniest Film: Severance
- Funniest Man: Russell Brand
- Funniest Woman: Ashley Jensen
- Funniest Reality TV Personality: Paul Danan
- Funniest Radio Show: Chris Moyles Show (Radio 1)
- Funniest DVD: Green Wing (Series One)
- Funniest Website: socceram.net
- Loaded Legend: Ricky Tomlinson

=== 2007 ===
- Funniest man in Britain: Justin Lee Collins
- Funniest double act: Justin Lee Collins and Alan Carr
- Funniest woman: Michelle Gomez
- Funniest TV programme: The Mighty Boosh
- Funniest TV Personality: Paul Kaye
- Best film: Hot Fuzz
- Funniest reality TV person: David Gest
- Funniest radio show: Scott Mills (Radio 1)
- Funniest DVD: Shameless, series 3
- Loaded Legend: Vic Reeves

=== 2008 ===
- Best stand-up: Jimmy Carr
- Funniest TV personality: Mike Strutter (Paul Kaye)
- Funniest TV show: My Name Is Earl
- Funniest film: In Bruges
- Funniest radio show: Scott Mills
- Funniest man: Leigh Francis
- Funniest woman: Ruth Jones
- Loaded Legend: Harry Enfield

=== 2010 ===
- Funniest Man: Justin Lee Collins
- Funniest Woman: Katy Brand
- Funniest Show On TV: The Inbetweeners
- Funniest Comedy Panel Show: 8 Out Of 10 Cats
- Best Stand-Up: Michael McIntyre
- Funniest Double Act: Vic Reeves & Bob Mortimer
- Funniest TV Personality: Jonathan Ross
- Funniest Podcast: Adam and Joe
- Funniest Radio Sidekick: Beccy Huxtable (Radio 1 Drivetime)
- Funniest DVD: Russell Howard Dingledodies
- Funniest Twitterer: James Buckley
- Funniest Newspaper Columnist: Gordon Smart (The Sun)
- Loaded Legend: Frank Skinner

=== 2011 ===
- Stand-up legend: Rich Hall
- Funniest man: Alan Carr
- Best stand-up: Michael McIntyre
- Funniest woman: Isy Suttie
- Funniest double act: Vic and Bob
- Best panel show: Ask Rhod Gilbert
- Funniest TV show: PhoneShop
- Funniest film: The Infidel
- Funniest DVD: The Mighty Boosh on Tour: Journey of the Childmen
- Funniest podcast: Keith Lemon's Brilliant Podcast
- Funniest sidekick: Comedy Dave (Radio 1)
- Funniest TV personality: Rhod Gilbert
- Loaded legend: Jimmy Carr

=== 2012 ===
- Funniest Man: Jon Richardson
- Best Stand-up: Alan Carr
- Funniest Woman: Andi Osho
- Funniest Double-Act: Vic & Bob
- Best Panel Show: Celebrity Juice
- Funniest TV Show: Fresh Meat
- Funniest Film: The Inbetweeners Movie
- Funniest Columnist: Gordon Smart
- Funniest TV Personality: Lee Nelson (Simon Brodkin)
- Funniest Twitterer: Dom Joly
- Funniest DVD: Jimmy Carr: Being Funny
- Funniest Podcast: Pappy's Flatshare Slamdown
- Funniest Road Show: Danny Wallace, Xfm
- Best Internet Viral Show: Misery Bear
- Best Newcomer: Patrick Monahan
- Funniest Joke: Tim Vine - "Conjunctivitus.com - that's a site for sore eyes."
- Loaded Legend: Rob Brydon

=== 2013 ===
- Stand-up legend: Rich Hall
- Best male comedian: Harry Hill
- Best stand-up: Paul Chowdhry
- Best female comedian: Morgana Robinson
- Funniest double act: Rylan Clark & Gary Barlow
- Best panel show: Celebrity Juice
- Funniest TV show: Cardinal Burns
- Funniest film: Keith Lemon: The Film
- Funniest columnist: Clemmie Moodie
- Funniest TV personality: Angelos Epithemiou
- Funniest Tweeter: Danny Dyer
- Funniest DVD: Lee Nelson Live
- Funniest podcast: Dave's comedy podcast
- Funniest radio show: Greg James (radio show) (Radio 1)
- Best newcomer: Nick Helm
- Loaded legend: Al Murray

== See also ==
- British Comedy Guide Awards
- Edinburgh Comedy Awards
- National Comedy Awards
- Comic's Choice
