= Whatever I Want =

2000 British television sketch show

- Genre: Sketch show
- Written by: Leigh Francis; Richard Preddy; Gary Howe; Gavin Claxton
- Directed by: Gavin Claxton
- Starring: Leigh Francis
- Composers: Claudio Giussani; David Blair
- Country of origin: United Kingdom
- Original language: English
- No. of series: 1
- No. of episodes: 6

Production
- Executive producer: John Noel
- Producers: Johnny Lowry; Gavin Claxton
- Cinematography: Rupert Wyatt
- Editor: Alex Hutchinson
- Running time: 30 minutes
- Production company: Bellyache Productions

Original release
- Network: ITV
- Release: 7 January – 11 February 2000

Whatever I Want is a six-part British television sketch show, written by and starring Leigh Francis, that first broadcast on ITV on 7 January 2000. Commissioned by Bellyache Productions, and overseen by Gavin Claxton, the series featured early prototypes of the characters of Keith Lemon and Avid Merrion, as well as a human version of The Bear known as Barry Gibson, who had previously appeared as a roving reporter during the early series of Channel 4's Popworld.

The series broadcast at 11:30pm on Fridays in LWT regions only, and has never been repeated since broadcast, nor released on DVD. Each episode featured a number of celebrity guests, including Davina McCall, who first discovered Francis performing in-role stand-up comedy in a southern comedy club, and encouraged him to pursue a career in television. Reworked versions of Keith Lemon and Avid Merrion would later go on to appear as characters in Francis' Channel 4 sketch show Bo' Selecta!.

== Characters ==
- Barry Gibson; a budding television presenter & antique aficionado.
- Avid Merrion; a Transylvanian-celebrity "stalker".
- Keith Lemon; a failed former businessman-of-the-year.

== Episodes ==
No.	Title	Guest(s)	Original release date
1	"Episode 1"	Davina McCall	7 January 2000
2	"Episode 2"		14 January 2000
3	"Episode 3"	TBA	21 January 2000
4	"Episode 4"	Davina McCall, Claudia Winkleman	28 January 2000
5	"Episode 5"	Claudia Winkleman	4 February 2000
6	"Episode 6"	Mandy Smith, Cleo Rocos, Sarah Cawood, Kate Thornton	11 February 2000
Keith Lemon enlists the help of Mandy Smith to redecorate an elderly woman's lift. Cleo Rocos helps Keith to give city office manager Brian a taste of the countryside. Avid Merrion stakes out a car park in the hope of bumping into Nicolas Cage. Barry Gibson tries his hand at abstract art, before inviting two close friends, Sarah Cawood and Kate Thornton, round for pizza.
