= Keith Lemon's LemonAid =

Television series

- Genre: Entertainment
- Presented by: Leigh Francis as Keith Lemon
- Country of origin: United Kingdom
- Original language: English
- No. of series: 1
- No. of episodes: 6

Production
- Production location: Teddington Studios
- Running time: 45 minutes (including adverts)
- Production company: Talkback in association with Bang Tidy Productions

Original release
- Network: ITV
- Release: 7 April – 19 May 2012

Related
- Surprise!, Surprise! OMG! Jedward's Dream Factory

Keith Lemon's LemonAid is a British television entertainment series hosted by comedian Leigh Francis as his character Keith Lemon. It aired on ITV from 7 April to 19 May 2012. Each week, with the help of a celebrity guest, Lemon makes people's dreams come true. He calls himself "The Dream-Meckah!".

== Background ==
The idea for LemonAid stemmed from a pilot programme recorded by Francis in July 2011, entitled The Bang Tidy Show. The project was released to media with the following tagline: "Promising to be as off the wall as Celebrity Juice, this brand new Saturday night entertainment show stars all of the usual celebrity guests, plus there's a talking orangutan, a door that leads to anywhere, audience games and prizes, a supermarket in the future staffed by old celebrities and the opportunity for the audience to ask Keith anything they want. Each show will end with a big performance by Keith and his celebrity guest.". Despite receiving positive reception from the pilot's audience, ITV decided against commissioning it into a series, stating that "it really had nowhere to go.". As such, Francis was informed that in order to get the project commissioned, he would need to find a suitable theme that would appeal to a mass audience. It features Lemon giving advice and helping people solve their problems, using his usual manner of behaviour and cheek. Each episode also features a celebrity helper, who assists with the studio games and other various activities, and a musical guest, to round off the show. A pilot episode for the series, which was originally called Keith Kisses it Better!, was filmed on 30 October 2011, and following further positive reception, was commissioned into a full series by ITV under the name LemonAid. Filming began in March 2012, and the first episode of the series premiered on 7 April. The series contained six episodes each 45 minutes in length.

== Studio games ==
The game "Lemon Drops" features every week, where each celebrity helper played the Phat Controller, and Lemon would be launched above the studio audience and drop soft, fluffy lemons with a prize inside into the audience. However, in the fourth episode, Lemon played the Phat Controller with helper Peter Andre dropping the lemons over the audience. Lemon's motto for Lemon Drops is "When life gives you lemons, open that lemon and see if there's a prize inside!". The other game in the studio will feature three contestants, usually each with a talent, who play to win a prize.
