= Keith Lemon: The Film =

- Theatrical release poster
- Directed by: Paul Angunawela
- Written by: Leigh Francis; Paul Angunawela
- Produced by: Aidan Elliott; Mark Huffam
- Starring: Leigh Francis; Verne Troyer; Kevin Bishop; Laura Aikman; Kelly Brook
- Cinematography: Julian Court
- Edited by: Peter Boyle
- Production companies: Generator Entertainment; Molinare Studio; Northern Ireland Screen
- Distributed by: Lionsgate
- Release date: 24 August 2012
- Running time: 85 minutes
- Country: United Kingdom
- Language: English
- Box office: £5.4 million

Keith Lemon: The Film is a 2012 British comedy film written and directed by Paul Angunawela, and co-written by and starring Leigh Francis as television personality Keith Lemon. The film co-stars Verne Troyer as his guardian angel (In his final film appearance before his death in April 2018), Archimedes, Kevin Bishop as his best friend, Dougie, Laura Aikman as Keith's girlfriend Rosie and Kelly Brook as herself. The film also features a selection of celebrity cameos, including appearances by David Hasselhoff, Ronan Keating, Gary Barlow, Peter Andre, Fearne Cotton, Emma Bunton and Jedward, amongst others.

The film's plot surrounds Lemon's rags to riches story, after achieving success on the basis of a mobile phone with a lemon sweet stuck on the back. It received a rare 0% on Rotten Tomatoes. On 13 January 2014, Francis confirmed that the writing of a sequel had been completed. He also announced at the 2015 National Television Awards on 21 January 2015 that the sequel had been pushed back and that he would instead focus on other projects.

== Plot ==
Keith Lemon (Leigh Francis) is an aspiring business entrepreneur from Leeds, who is trying to secure investment for his invention, the Securipole (a metal pole put in the driveway to prevent car theft). He travels to London to present the Securipole at an inventor's convention, putting his friend Dougie (Kevin Bishop) in charge of his business while he is away. Keith's girlfriend Rosie (Laura Aikman) advises that he should start the Securipole business slowly and try to sell some poles in Leeds first, but Keith is too eager for the Securipole to be an overnight success and ignores her.

At the convention, Keith's demonstration of the Securipole fails to attract investors and leaves the public underwhelmed. Keith is devastated by his failure, but is approached by another entrepreneur named Kushvinder (Harish Patel), who offers to give him rights to his own unsuccessful invention, a touch-screen mobile phone without buttons, which Keith reluctantly accepts. In Leeds, a shipment of one million Securipoles arrives at Keith's office, to Rosie and Dougie's dismay. Before going to London, Keith had ordered the Securipoles (his dyscalculia leading him to believe that he had only ordered one thousand), from a benefactor named Evil Steve (Leigh Francis), who is notorious for torturing and even killing clients who fail to pay him. Rosie and Dougie are unable to pay for the poles or contact Keith, so Evil Steve kidnaps Rosie. Before she is taken away, she orders Dougie to travel to London and find Keith.

After Keith is attacked by a group of muggers, a talking satellite navigation app on Kushvinder's phone leads him to the office of Archimedes (Verne Troyer), an advice guru who tries to solve the problems of those in need. Archimedes hears out Keith's plight and manages to get him an appearance on a television chat show hosted by David Hasselhoff (playing an exaggerated version of himself). On the show, Keith tries to promote Kushvinder's phone, but the audience is uninterested. Thinking quickly, he sticks a lemon-shaped sweet on the phone, making it look like it has a lemon on the cover, which immediately impresses the audience. The "Lemon Phone" becomes an overnight success, and Keith is instantly propelled into the life he has always wanted. He becomes a household name, earns billions of pounds from the Lemon Phone, and starts dating Kelly Brook (playing an exaggerated version of herself) who, unbeknownst to Keith, is only dating him so she can divorce him and take his money later. Despite Archimedes' advice however, Keith prefers his new celebrity lifestyle and decides not to return to Leeds, the Securipole business or Rosie.

Keith hosts a toga party at a luxury venue, but during the party he is confronted by Dougie, who tells him Evil Steve has kidnapped Rosie and is going to kill her unless he pays for the Securipoles. Refusing to listen and no longer caring about what he left behind in Leeds, Keith dismisses Dougie and throws him out. This angers Archimedes, who also leaves. Going back to Leeds, Dougie decides to rescue Rosie himself, dressing up as Rambo and storming into Evil Steve's warehouse lair, but his plan fails when he accidentally knocks himself out on a metal bar. Back at the party, as Keith and Kelly take to the stage to sing together, the Lemon Phone is suddenly revealed to have a major technical fault that causes the owner's mouth to sag, giving them a speech impediment. The mouths of everyone who were using the phone immediately sag, including those of Kelly and some of Keith's celebrity friends. Outraged, the crowd at the party turn on Keith and chase him on to the roof of the building. Realising the error of his ways, Keith finds Archimedes and begs for forgiveness, but Kelly and the angry mob force him over the balcony. As he falls to the ground, he is saved by Archimedes, who reveals that he is a guardian angel, and explains that he put Keith through this experience to teach him not to ignore his friends and loved ones in the pursuit of success.

Archimedes flies Keith back to Leeds, dropping him over Evil Steve's lair and proceeding to Heaven. Keith falls through the roof, causing rubble to fall on top of Evil Steve, and rescues Rosie from being lowered into a vat of molten metal. He apologises to his friends for ignoring them, and proposes to Rosie. At first, Rosie is angered by Keith's actions and refuses to forgive him (especially when Keith off-handedly confesses that Kelly Brook was the superior girlfriend), but she soon accepts both his apology and proposal, and with their relationship repaired, Keith, Rosie and Dougie leave the warehouse. During the end credits, Keith explains through a voice-over that he settled down and had a family with Rosie, and converted the Securipoles into water pumps for countries in the "Fourth World".

== Cast ==
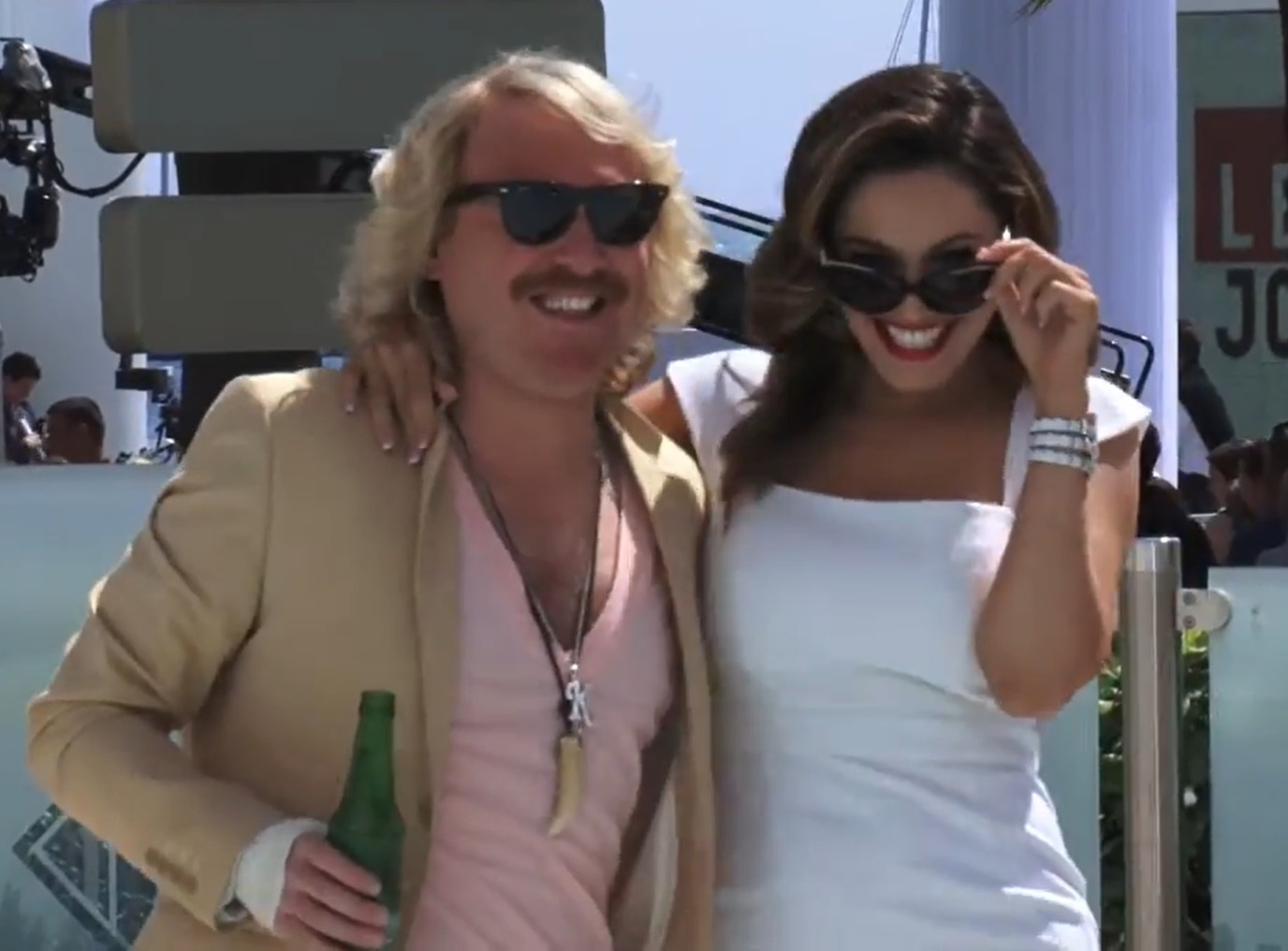
Keith Lemon (Leigh Francis) and Kelly Brook at the 2012 Cannes Film Festival

- Leigh Francis as Keith Lemon, Craig David, Mel B, Evil Steve, The Bear and Avid Merrion
- Verne Troyer as Archimedes
- Kevin Bishop as Dougie
- Laura Aikman as Rosie
- Kelly Brook as herself
- Harish Patel as Kushvinder
- Nina Wadia as Pat
- Paddy McGuinness as Gary
- Graeme Keast as Crazy audience member (Hoff Hour)

=== Celebrity cameos ===
- Peter Andre
- Gary Barlow
- Fearne Cotton
- Emma Bunton
- Melanie Chisholm
- Gino D'Acampo
- Jason Donovan
- David Hasselhoff
- Jedward
- Vernon Kay
- Ronan Keating
- Chris Moyles
- Billy Ocean
- Rizzle Kicks
- Phillip Schofield
- Tinchy Stryder
- Holly Willoughby
- Denise van Outen

== Reception ==
=== Critical response ===
The film was universally panned. Rotten Tomatoes gave it a rare 0% score, based on twelve reviews.

In a one-star review in The Daily Telegraph, Robbie Collin said "it may be the most staggeringly perfunctory piece of filmmaking I have ever seen." Phelim O'Neill, in another one-star review for The Guardian, said "the script ... must have taken longer to read than it did to write." In writing for Total Film, George Bass describes the funniest moment in the film as "a bus sign (“T’LEEDS”). Six letters and an apostrophe. Save yourself the ticket."

In a scathing review, Mark Kermode described the film as "unbelievably puerile" and "shockingly terrible", saying that he had found the experience of digging a five pence coin from the armrest of his chair less revolting than the film. He later placed it at number one on his worst films of 2012 list and, in 2018, at number five of his worst movies of the past ten years.

=== Box office ===
The movie debuted at #5 at the UK Box Office, earning £1,196,310 in revenue. In its opening weekend, the film was the highest ranking debut film at the box office. During its second weekend, the movie dropped to #9, earning £370,735, for a two-week total gross of £2,531,902. It went on to make a total of £4,017,234.

=== Awards ===
The film won three BARFTA awards (a spoof award given to poorly-reviewed films, similar to the Razzies): Worst Film, Worst Dialogue and Worst Female Acting Performance.

== Distribution ==
Keith Lemon: The Film was released on DVD and Blu-ray in the UK on 10 December 2012. The set includes an uncut version of the film which was not shown in cinemas.
