= The Thomas Aveling School =

Thomas Aveling School

Location
- Arethusa Road; Rochester, Kent, ME1 2UW; England; 51.3645°N 0.5024°E

Information
- Type: Academy
- Motto: An academy for success
- Established: 1990
- Department for Education URN: 137376 Tables
- Ofsted: Reports
- Headteacher: Fiona Linter
- Gender: Co-educational
- Age: 11 to 18
- Houses: Victory , Resolute , Cavalier , Achilles
- Colours: Blue, gold and white
- Academy Trust: Beyond Schools Trust
- Website: www.thomasaveling.co.uk

The Thomas Aveling School is a secondary school and sixth form with academy status, located in Rochester, Kent, England.

== History ==
The school is named after Thomas Aveling, inventor of the traction engine and a partner in the world's largest manufacturer of steamrollers in the 19th century, Aveling and Porter, who were located in Rochester. The school badge depicts one of Aveling's steamrollers, below two trees that cross one another to represent the merging of two schools.

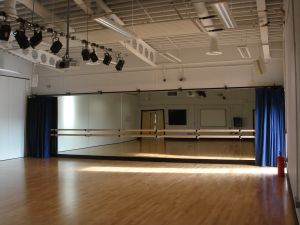
Drama/Dance facility

The Thomas Aveling School was formed in 1990 after three local schools, (Warren Wood Boys, Warren Wood Girls and Highfield) were closed. The former Warren Wood Boys School site was re-developed with new facilities added to the refurbished classroom and administration block and school hall. During the 1990s, the school became grant-maintained, enabling the Board of Governors to expand the facilities, including the addition of a sports hall in 1997. In 2001, the school received a positive Ofsted report.

In 1997, with the lapse of the grant-maintained system within England, the school became a foundation school and was taken under the authority of the newly formed Medway LEA. The school went on to gain Technology College status and Training School status. The school became an academy in September 2011.

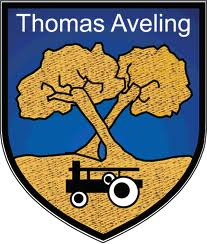

== Site ==
Since its creation in 1990, new facilities have been built at the school. These include development of the Learning Resource Centre and Community Library (2002), a music recording studio (2003), fitness and media suites (2004), a post-16 science lab (2005), a design & technology suite (2006), a drama facility (2008) and, more recently, sports facilities.

== Subjects ==
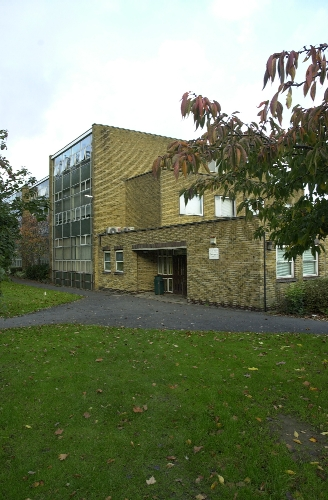
Part of school building (front)

In Years 7 and 8 students study English, Maths, Science, Design Technology, PE, RE, PSHE, History, Geography, Art, Dance, Drama, Music and a Modern Foreign Language.

When entering Year 9 all students study English, Maths, Science, RE and PSHE. Students then have a free choice of four other subjects to study at GCSE. The options include Art & Design, Business studies, Dance, Drama, Geography, History, ICT, Media studies, Modern Foreign Languages and Music.

== League Tables and Examination results ==
A 2012 BBC report says that 45% of students received 5 A*-Cs in GCSE subjects. 85% of sixth form students attained three A-levels. As a result, the school became the 12th best secondary school in the Medway towns based on GCSE results, and 10th based on students getting three A-levels or equivalent.

== Notable former pupils ==
- Kelly Brook – Model and television presenter
