= Leigh Francis =

English actor and comedian (born 1973)

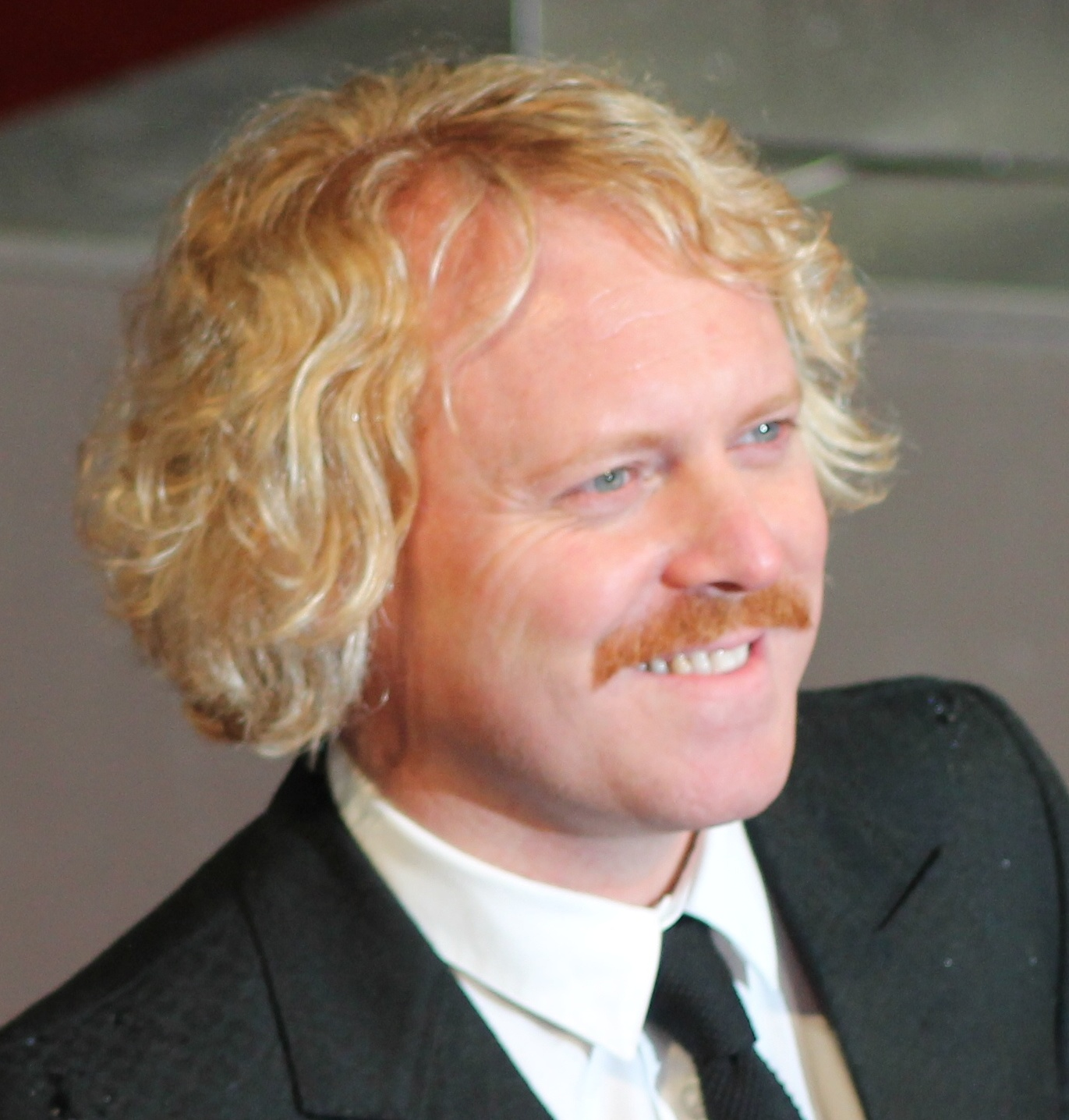
- Francis as Keith Lemon at the 66th British Academy Film Awards in 2013
- Born: Leigh Izaak Francis; 30 April 1973 (age 53); Leeds, West Riding of Yorkshire, England
- Spouse: Jill Carter (m. 2002)
- Children: 2

Comedy career
- Years active: 1995–present
- Medium: Television
- Genres: Character comedy; impressions; parody; sketch

Leigh Izaak Francis (born 30 April 1973) is an English comedian, television presenter, actor, and writer. He is best known for creating and portraying the character Keith Lemon. Francis created and starred in Channel 4's sketch comedy show Bo' Selecta! (2002–2009) and presented the ITV shows Celebrity Juice (2008–2022) and Through the Keyhole (2013–2019). His other comedy shows include Lemon La Vida Loca (2012–2013), The Keith Lemon Sketch Show (2015–2016), and The Keith & Paddy Picture Show (2017–2018), as well as the film Keith Lemon: The Film (2012).

== Early life ==
Leigh Izaak Francis was born in Old Farnley, Leeds, West Riding of Yorkshire, on 30 April 1973, and was brought up on a council estate in Old Farnley, Leeds. His father died aged 47 of cancer.

Francis attended Farnley Park High School (now The Farnley Academy). He later studied at Jacob Kramer College and received a qualification in graphic design. Before making his major television breakthrough, he was discovered and encouraged by television presenter Davina McCall, performing in-role stand-up comedy in a southern comedy club.

McCall landed Francis his first television role on Dom and Kirk's Nite O' Plenty, where he portrayed Bobby Stark, a man who gives tips on how to win over the ladies. The series aired on Paramount Television from January to July 1996. Francis' second television role was as Barry Gibson, a music paparazzo, featured on the early series of Channel 4's Popworld. Francis also starred as various characters, including Gibson, Keith Lemon and Avid Merrion in the series Whatever I Want, which aired late night on ITV in 2000.

== Career ==
In his early career, Francis did a series of shorts for Comedy Central (then known as Paramount Comedy) called Stars in Their Houses. Some of the shorts can be found on YouTube.

His major television breakthrough occurred when Channel 4 offered him a £250,000 deal to produce a series based on his television characters, such as his previous roles as Bobby Stark and Barry Gibson, and in 2002, Bo' Selecta! was born. The series featured Francis portraying a series of celebrities by wearing face masks to impersonate them, as well as portraying the main, non-celebrity character, Avid Merrion. The programme lasted for five series, airing between 2002 and 2006, however, the last two series were only loosely based on the original three. Series 4 was subtitled A Bear's Tail, and was based on another of his characters, The Bear. Series 5 returned to Avid Merrion and was called Bo! in the USA.

Following the axing of Bo' Selecta!, Francis took one of the series characters, Keith Lemon, and created a brand new show, Keith Lemon's Very Brilliant World Tour, which aired on ITV2 in April 2008. The show was a success, and subsequently, Francis created another new show featuring Lemon, Celebrity Juice, which aired for 26 series between 2008 and 2022. Lemon also co-hosted Sing If You Can (2011) with Stacey Solomon and Keith Lemon's LemonAid (2012) on ITV.

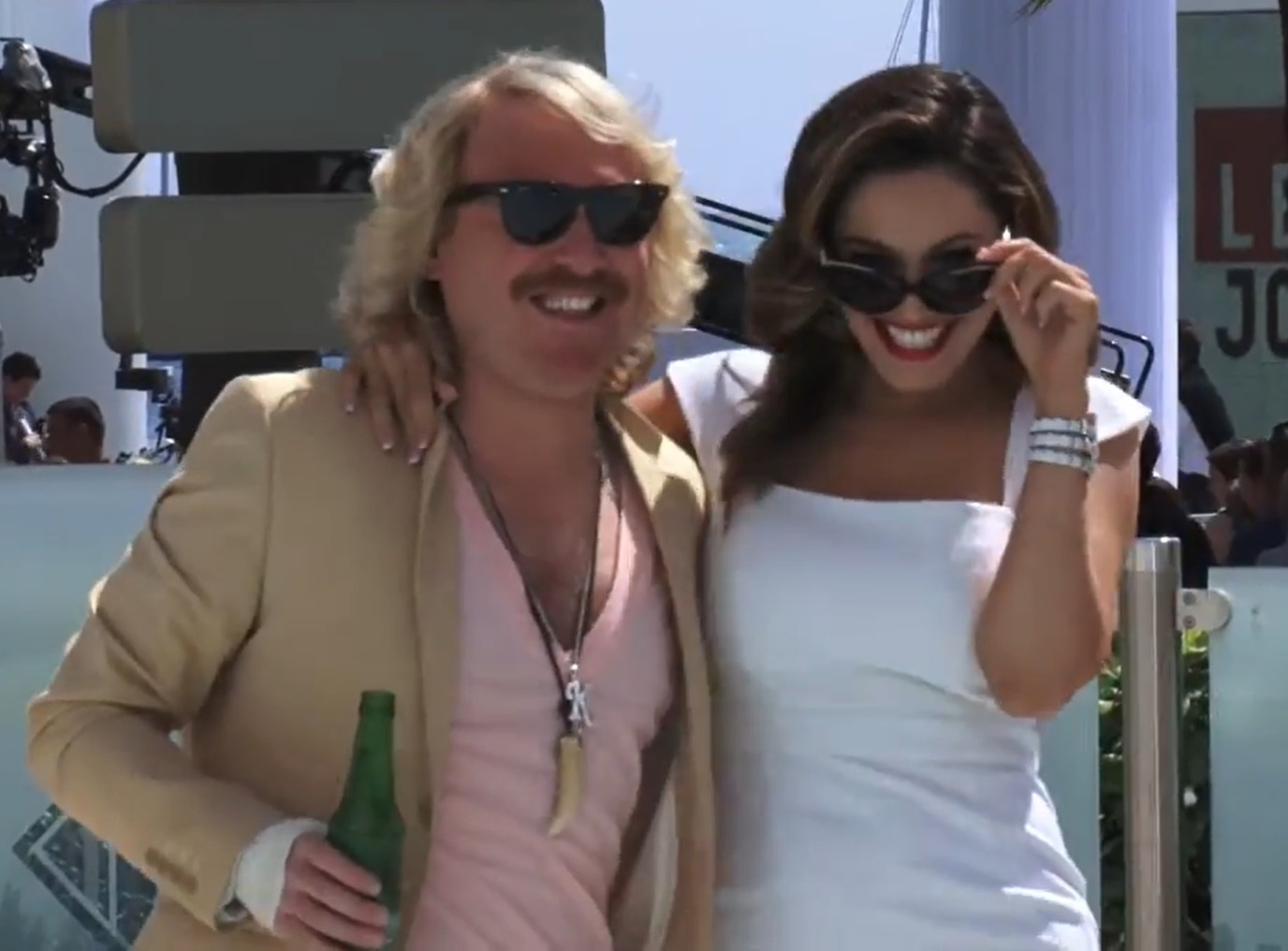
Francis with Kelly Brook at the 2012 Cannes Film Festival

In 2012, he was the protagonist in his feature film debut in the self-titled Keith Lemon: The Film, alongside Kelly Brook. Francis has since presented and/or appeared in numerous other ITV2 programmes in character as Lemon, including Through the Keyhole (2013–2019), The Keith Lemon Sketch Show (2015–2016), The Keith & Paddy Picture Show (2017–2018), alongside Paddy McGuinness and Shopping with Keith Lemon (2019–2023). Francis had a cameo in Rocketman, the 2019 Elton John biopic, playing a shop worker named Pete.

Talking about a scrapped pilot for a Bo Selecta reboot, Francis retired the character of Keith Lemon, saying "Keith Lemon is, well, I'll never kill any characters off... I don't ever kill any characters off. Apart from if it's one that someone is really upset by. Then you don't do it anymore, because you only d**k about to put smiles on people's faces.". Francis continues to producing content for his YouTube, where he posts sketches in the vein of Selecta and other characters. In early 2024, Francis went on tour, starring in My First Time.

He competed on The Great Stand Up to Cancer Bake Off (a charity special of The Great British Bake Off) in 2024 where he won the second episode of the 7th series. On Monday 21 October 2024, he made a one-off cameo appearance in the West End Production of Back to the Future the Musical as Strickland at the Adelphi Theatre for Back to the Future Day.

== Personal life ==
On 30 October 2002, at Allerton Castle, North Yorkshire, Francis married Jill Carter, a beauty therapist. They have two daughters.

On 4 June 2020, Francis apologised on Instagram, as himself, for his portrayal of various Black celebrities on Bo' Selecta!. In the video description he added "Following recent events, I've done a lot of talking and learning and I would like to put this out there. I want to apologise to anyone that was offended by Bo'selecta. I'm on a constant journey of knowledge and just wanted to say I'm deeply sorry. #blacklivesmatter".

== Characterisation ==
In interviews, Francis usually adopts one of his celebrity guises, being interviewed as Avid Merrion during Bo' Selecta!'s run between 2002 and 2006, and as Keith Lemon ever since. In an out-of-character interview with On: Yorkshire Magazine, Francis confirmed Avid Merrion's accent and dialects were inspired by his former tutor at Jacob Kramer College, Laimonis Mieriņš. He also pointed out Merrion is a misspelling of Mieriņš, and has nothing to do with the Merrion Centre in Leeds as some may have assumed. Francis has also been interviewed as himself for The Frank Skinner Show, Loose Women, Big Brother's Little Brother, The Museum of Curiosity, Friday Night with Jonathan Ross, and Sunday Brunch.

== Filmography ==
=== Television ===
Year	Title	Role	Notes
1999	Comedy Café	Barry Gibson	1 episode
2000	Whatever I Want	Himself	
2002–2009	Bo' Selecta!	Various Roles	Also writer - 5 series
2005	A Bear's Tail	Bear	Also writer 1 series
2008	Keith Lemon's Very Brilliant World Tour	Presenter	
2008–2022	Celebrity Juice	Presenter	26 series
2009	Let's Dance For Sports Relief	Contestant	With Paddy McGuinness
2011	Sing If You Can	Co–presenter	With Stacey Solomon
2012	Keith Lemon's LemonAid	Presenter	
2012–2013	Lemon La Vida Loca	Himself	Also writer 2 series
2013–2019	Through the Keyhole	Presenter	6 series
2015–2016	The Keith Lemon Sketch Show	Various Roles	Also writer 2 series
2015	1000 Heartbeats	Contestant	1 episode
2017–2018	The Keith & Paddy Picture Show	Various Roles	Co-star with Paddy McGuinness 2 series
2018	Keith Lemon: Coming in America	Presenter	1 series
2019–2023	Shopping with Keith Lemon	Presenter	4 series
2020	The Fantastical Factory of Curious Craft	Presenter	1 series
2020	Britain's Best Selling Toys	Presenter	One-off special
2020	How's Your Head, Hun?	Himself	Special guest 1 episode
2021	The Holden Girls: Mandy & Myrtle	Myrtle Holden	1 series
2022	The Real Dirty Dancing	Co-Presenter	With Ashley Roberts
2024	The Great Celebrity Bake Off for Stand Up To Cancer	Contestant & Star Baker	Series 7 episode 2
2026	I'm a Celebrity... Get Me Out of Here!	Contestant	Series 26

=== Film ===
Year	Title	Role	Notes
2012	Keith Lemon: The Film	Himself	
2019	Rocketman	Pete	Cameo

== Awards and nominations ==
Award	Date	Category	Work	Result	Ref.
2002	British Comedy Award	Best Comedy Newcomer	Bo' Selecta!	Nominated	
2003	Loaded Lafta Awards	Funniest show on TV	Bo' Selecta!	Won	
2003	Loaded Lafta Awards	Funniest Man	Avid Merrion in Bo' Selecta!	Won	
2004	BAFTA TV Awards	Best Comedy Programme or Series Award	Bo' Selecta!	Nominated	
2008	Loaded Lafta Awards	Funniest Man		Won	
2011	Loaded Lafta Awards	Funniest Podcast	Keith Lemon's Brilliant Podcast	Won	
2012	Loaded Lafta Awards	Funniest Panel Show	Celebrity Juice	Won	
2012	17th National Television Awards	Most Popular Entertainment Presenter	as Keith Lemon in Celebrity Juice	Nominated	
2013	18th National Television Awards	Most Popular Entertainment Presenter	as Keith Lemon in Celebrity Juice	Nominated	
2013	Loaded Lafta Awards	Funniest Panel Show	Celebrity Juice	Won	
2013	Loaded Lafta Awards	Funniest Film	Keith Lemon: The Film	Won	
2015	20th National Television Awards	Most Popular Entertainment Presenter		Nominated	
