= List of Celebrity Juice episodes =

This is a list of episodes of Celebrity Juice, a British comedy panel game show that ran from 2008 to 2022 on ITV2.

Contents

Series: 1 · 2 · 3 · 4 · 5 · 6 · 7 · 8 · 9 · 10 · 11 · 12 · 13 · 14 · 15 · 16 · 17 · 18 · 19 · 20 · 21 · 22 · 23 · 24 · 25 · 26 · Specials

== Series overview ==
Series	Episodes	Originally aired		Average viewers (millions)
Series	Episodes	Series premiere	Series finale	Average viewers (millions)
1	8	24 September 2008	12 November 2008	—N/a
2	10	25 February 2009	29 April 2009	—N/a
3	10	18 March 2010	20 May 2010	0.685
4	14	9 September 2010	30 December 2010	1.444
5	16	10 February 2011	26 May 2011	1.986
6	13	1 September 2011	29 December 2011	2.363
7	13	9 February 2012	3 May 2012	2.765
8	15	30 August 2012	21 December 2012	2.332
9	13	28 February 2013	23 May 2013	2.448
10	15	29 August 2013	26 December 2013	1.613
11	12	20 February 2014	22 May 2014	1.755
12	13	11 September 2014	30 December 2014	1.510
13	10	19 March 2015	21 May 2015	1.394
14	14	10 September 2015	30 December 2015	1.176
15	10	17 March 2016	19 May 2016	1.349
16	14	8 September 2016	29 December 2016	1.356
17	11	23 March 2017	8 June 2017	1.130
18	12	14 September 2017	21 December 2017	1.273
19	11	22 March 2018	7 June 2018	1.064
20	12	13 September 2018	20 December 2018	0.974
21	11	21 March 2019	4 June 2019	0.780
22	8	10 October 2019	19 December 2019	0.856
23	6	9 April 2020	14 May 2020	0.491
24	10	22 October 2020	27 December 2020	0.533
25	10	8 April 2021	16 December 2021	0.472
26	10	24 March 2022	26 May 2022	—N/a
Specials	5	5 March 2011	15 December 2022	—N/a

== Episode list ==
Bold indicates a guest captain.

=== Series 1 ===
This was the first series to feature Holly Willoughby and Fearne Cotton as team captains.

Episode no.	Series no.	Original air date	Holly's team	Fearne's team	Amy Winehouse / Gape Magazine Head
1	1	24 September 2008	Dermot O'Leary, Rav Singh	Laurence Llewelyn-Bowen, Paddy McGuinness	Lesley Joseph (Note: The guest round for these episodes was entitled 'Have a Dig in Winehouse's Wig', with Winehouse's wig containing a selection of categories.)
2	2	1 October 2008	Katie Price, Katy Brand	Rufus Hound, Peter Andre	Faith Brown
3	3	8 October 2008	Gareth Gates, Dave Berry	Russell Kane, Chico Slimani	Nikki Grahame
4	4	15 October 2008	Emma Bunton, Jack Whitehall	Lee Ryan, Tim Vine	The Cheeky Girls (Note: The guest round for these episodes became the regular 'Cover Stories' round, which was featured up to Series 11. The magazine in this series was 'Gape'.)
5	5	22 October 2008	David Gest, Rob Rouse	Kerry Katona, Jason Byrne	Warwick Davis
6	6	29 October 2008 (Note: Halloween special.)	Stephen K. Amos, Eamonn Holmes	Rufus Hound, Calum Best	Brian Belo (Note: Footage on the Too Juicy for TV DVD reveals that Belo appeared as the magazine head for both episodes six and seven, but his appearance from episode six was cut.)
7	7	5 November 2008	Matt Littler, Darren Jeffries, Shaun Williamson	Verne Troyer, John Bishop	Brian Belo
8	8	12 November 2008	Tara Palmer-Tomkinson, Alex Zane	Antony Cotton, Andrew Maxwell	Pat Sharp

=== Series 2 ===
This was the first series to feature Rufus Hound as a regular panellist.

Episode no.	Series no.	Original air date	Holly's team	Fearne and Rufus' team	'Eat Magazine Head	UK viewers (millions) (incl. +1)
9	1	25 February 2009	Kevin Bishop, Sara Cox	Coolio	Bianca Gascoigne	0.507
10	2	4 March 2009	Joe Swash, Rob Deering	**Peaches Geldof** (Note: Fearne Cotton was not present in these episodes as she was participating in the Comic Relief mountain climb of Mount Kilimanjaro. Peaches Geldof stood in as team captain.), Scott Mills	Cleo Rocos	—N/a
11	3	11 March 2009	Jodie Marsh, Andrew Maxwell	**Peaches Geldof**, Louis Walsh	Keith Harris	—N/a
12	4	18 March 2009	**Chanelle Hayes** (Note: Holly Willoughby was not present during the second half of this episode due to illness. Chanelle Hayes took over as team captain.), David Van Day, Dave Berry	Denise van Outen	Chanelle Hayes	—N/a
13	5	25 March 2009 (Note: Summer special.)	Carol McGiffin, Dick and Dom	Thomas Turgoose	Bradley McIntosh	—N/a
14	6	1 April 2009	Alex Zane, Heidi Range	Anton Du Beke	Ian "H" Watkins	—N/a
15	7	8 April 2009	George Lamb, Darryn Lyons	Kirsty Gallacher	Trevor and Simon	—N/a
16	8	15 April 2009	Matt Edmondson, Lauren Laverne	Christopher Biggins	Raef Bjayou	—N/a
17	9	22 April 2009	Brigitte Nielsen, Iain Lee	Tim Lovejoy	Derrick Evans	—N/a
18	10	29 April 2009	Claudia Winkleman, Paddy McGuinness	Tito Jackson	Nicola McLean	—N/a

=== Series 3 ===
Episode no.	Series no.	Original air date	Holly's team	Fearne and Rufus' team	NOWT Magazine Head	UK viewers (millions) (incl. +1)
19	1	18 March 2010	Abbey Clancy, Dave Berry	Craig Gazey	Louie Spence	0.796
20	2	25 March 2010 (Note: Rufus Hound was not present in these episodes as he was rehearsing for his appearances on Let's Dance for Comic Relief.)	Louis Walsh, Louise Redknapp	Louie Spence, Paddy McGuinness	Chico Slimani	0.519
21	3	1 April 2010	Sam & Mark, Jason Gardiner	Jack P. Shepherd	The Cheeky Girls	1.012
22	4	8 April 2010 (Note: Girls Night Out special.)	Tamzin Outhwaite, Paloma Faith	Emma Bunton	Vanessa Feltz	0.689
23	5	15 April 2010	Sally Morgan, Mathew Horne	Joe Swash	Russell Grant	—N/a
24	6	22 April 2010	Dermot O'Leary, Melvin Odoom	John Partridge	Debbie McGee	0.673
25	7	29 April 2010 (Note: BBC Radio 1 vs This Morning special.)	Phillip Schofield, Gino D'Acampo	Chris Moyles, Comedy Dave	Gordon the Gopher	1.044
26	8	6 May 2010	Peter Jones, Patrick Kielty	Janet Street-Porter	Andy Cunningham	0.788
27	9	13 May 2010	Caroline Flack, Chipmunk	Davina McCall	David Van Day	0.749
28	10	20 May 2010 (Note: "The Juiciest Bits" compilation episode.)	Compilation episode – best of Series 3			0.576

=== Series 4 ===
Episode no.	Series no.	Original air date	Holly's team	Fearne and Rufus' team	Closerer Magazine Head	UK viewers (millions) (incl. +1)
29	1	9 September 2010	Al Murray, Holly Valance	Michelle Keegan	Timmy Mallett	1.210
30	2	16 September 2010	Katie Price, Richard Bacon	Brian Dowling	Nancy Lam	1.227
31	3	23 September 2010	Dave Berry, Heidi Range	Verne Troyer	James MacKenzie	1.497
32	4	30 September 2010 (Note: TV Stars special.)	Lorraine Kelly, Andrew Maxwell	**Stephen Mulhern** (Note: Fearne Cotton was not present in this episode as she was taking part in the Breast Cancer Research Trek across Peru. Stephen Mulhern stood in as team captain.), Konnie Huq	Ray Griffiths	1.456
33	5	7 October 2010	Gino D'Acampo, Paloma Faith	Mel B	Anthony Kavanagh	1.583
34	6	14 October 2010 (Note: McFly special.)	Tom Fletcher, Danny Jones	Dougie Poynter, Harry Judd	John McCririck	1.446
35	7	21 October 2010 (Note: N-Dubz special.)	Tulisa, Fazer	Dappy	Caprice Bourret	1.584
36	8	28 October 2010 (Note: The X Factor special.)	Dermot O'Leary, Diana Vickers	Olly Murs	Peter Dickson	1.727
37	9	4 November 2010	Sara Cox, Preston	Ryan Thomas	Adam Rickitt	1.559
38	10	11 November 2010 (Note: "The Juiciest Bits" compilation episode.)	Compilation episode – best of Series 4			1.282
39	11	9 December 2010 (Note: Coronation Street special.)	Andrew Whyment, Shobna Gulati	Kym Marsh	Ken Morley	1.627
40	12	16 December 2010 (Note: JLS special.)	Aston Merrygold, JB Gill	Oritsé Williams, Marvin Humes	Scott Robinson	1.362
41	13	23 December 2010 (Note: Christmas special.)	Kian Egan, Mark Feehily	Russell Kane	Lionel Blair	1.469
42	14	30 December 2010 (Note: "The Bang Tidy Year" compilation episode.)	Compilation episode – best of Series 3 and 4			1.182

=== Series 5 ===
Episode no.	Series no.	Original air date	Holly's team	Fearne and Rufus' team	Morerer Magazine Head	UK viewers (millions) (incl. +1)
43	1	10 February 2011	Joe Swash, Mikey North	Stacey Solomon	Same Difference	1.468
44	2	17 February 2011	Alex Carter, Vanilla Ice	Gino D'Acampo	Michelle Bass	1.608
45	3	24 February 2011	**Gok Wan** (Note: Guest captain in place of Holly Willoughby, who was on maternity leave.), Josie Gibson, Danny Jones	Lethal Bizzle	Dane Bowers	1.797
46	4	3 March 2011	Olly Murs, Christine Bleakley	Adam Garcia	Maggot	1.812
48	5	10 March 2011 (Note: Up the Duff special.)	Emma Bunton, Myleene Klass	Gino D'Acampo	Stuart Baggs	1.917
49	6	17 March 2011	Johnny Vegas, Patsy Kensit	Craig Revel Horwood	Lembit Öpik	1.650
50	7	24 March 2011 (Note: Pop special.)	Kimberley Walsh, Chipmunk	Ronan Keating	Jon Lee	1.553
51	8	31 March 2011	Larry Lamb, George Lamb	Janice Dickinson	Chanelle Hayes	2.028
52	9	7 April 2011	Zoë Ball, Antony Cotton	Kimberly Wyatt	911	1.944
53	10	14 April 2011	**Rufus Hound**, Louis Walsh, Mel B	Vernon Kay, Scott Mills	Twist and Pulse	2.206
54	11	21 April 2011	**Chris Moyles**, Brooke Vincent, Louie Spence	Stacey Solomon	Richard Fairbrass	2.077
55	12	28 April 2011 (Note: Royal Wedding special.)	**Rufus Hound**, Brigitte Nielsen, Noel Clarke	Una Healy, Gemma Merna	Rosemary Shrager	2.329
56	13	5 May 2011	**Davina McCall**, Paddy McGuinness, David Guetta	Max George, Tom Parker	Brendan Sheerin	2.336
57	14	12 May 2011	**Chris Moyles**, Keith Duffy, Shane Lynch	Lulu	Gillian McKeith	2.290
58	15	19 May 2011 (Note: Coronation Street vs. Emmerdale special.)	Michelle Keegan, Craig Gazey	Kelvin Fletcher, Adele Silva	Martin Hancock	2.563
59	16	26 May 2011 (Note: "End of Series Party" compilation episode.)	Compilation episode – best of Series 5			2.197

=== Series 6 ===
Episode no.	Series no.	Original air date	Guests		Newerer Magazine Head	UK viewers (millions) (incl. +1)
Episode no.	Series no.	Original air date	Holly's team	Fearne and Rufus' team	Newerer Magazine Head	UK viewers (millions) (incl. +1)
60	1	1 September 2011 (Note: Rufus Hound was not present for these episodes as he was busy filming his scenes for Big Fat Gypsy Gangster.)	Joe McElderry, Mark Wright	Rochelle Wiseman, Dave Berry	Nanny Pat	1.869
61	2	8 September 2011 (Note: Back 2 School special.)	Alan Fletcher, Alex Reid	Example, Denise Welch	Diva Fever	1.560
62	3	15 September 2011 (Note: Girl on Girl special.)	Kerry Katona, Samia Smith	**Emma Bunton** (Note: Fearne Cotton was not present for this episode due to personal commitments. Emma Bunton stood in as team captain.), Pamela Anderson, Sam Faiers	Caprice	1.976
63	4	22 September 2011	Stacey Solomon, Paddy Doherty	Melanie C	Andrew Stone	2.128
64	5	29 September 2011	Richard Bacon, Denise van Outen	Tinchy Stryder	Ben Adams	2.155
65	6	6 October 2011	Olly Murs, Caroline Flack	Antony Cotton	Wagner	2.184
66	7	13 October 2011 (Note: Soap special.)	Natalie Anderson, Ricky Norwood	Michelle Collins, Nick Pickard	John Altman	2.455
67	8	20 October 2011	Chris Ramsey, Peter Andre	Verne Troyer	Chico Slimani	2.183
68	9	27 October 2011	Professor Green, Anthony McPartlin	Declan Donnelly	Roland Rat	3.121
69	10	3 November 2011 (Note: Pop special.)	Oritsé Williams, Aston Merrygold, Claire Richards	Rizzle Kicks	Keavy Lynch	2.375
70	11	10 November 2011 (Note: I'm a Celebrity... special.)	Russell Kane, Gino D'Acampo	Shaun Ryder	Kim Woodburn	2.631
71	12	22 December 2011 (Note: Christmas special.)	Paddy McGuinness, Amy Childs	Michelle Keegan	Basil Brush	2.607
72	13	29 December 2011 (Note: "2041: A Juice Odyssey" compilation episode.)	Compilation episode – best of Series 6			1.828

=== Series 7 ===
This was the last series to feature Rufus Hound as a regular panellist.

Episode no.	Series no.	Original air date	Guests		Glamourerer Magazine Head	UK viewers (millions) (incl. +1)
Episode no.	Series no.	Original air date	Holly's team	Fearne and Rufus' team	Glamourerer Magazine Head	UK viewers (millions) (incl. +1)
73	1	9 February 2012 (Note: Rufus Hound was only present for these episodes.)	Phillip Schofield, Christine Bleakley	Chris Fountain	Johnny Robinson	3.095
74	2	16 February 2012	Charlie Brooks, Adam Deacon	Matt Cardle	Zippy	2.534
75	3	23 February 2012	**Emma Bunton** (Note: Holly Willoughby was not present for this episode due to attending the launch party of The Voice UK. Emma Bunton stood in as team captain.), Jake Humphrey, Tess Daly	Danny Dyer	Paul Danan	2.857
76	4	1 March 2012 (Note: Hunks special.)	Harry Judd, Dougie Poynter, Andrew Flintoff	David Hasselhoff	2 Shoes	2.775
77	5	8 March 2012	Gino D'Acampo, Robbie Savage	Jason Donovan	Christine Hamilton	2.729
78	6	15 March 2012 (Note: Girls on Top special.)	Jorgie Porter, Mel B	Gemma Collins, Alexandra Burke	East 17	2.451
80	7	22 March 2012 (Note: Corrie vs. EastEnders special.)	Jack P. Shepherd, Catherine Tyldesley	John Partridge, Rita Simons	Ricky Groves	2.400
81	8	29 March 2012	Joey Essex, Christian Jessen	Olly Murs, Rick Edwards	Goldie Cheung	2.808
82	9	5 April 2012 (Note: Irish special.)	Kian Egan, Laura Whitmore	Paddy McGuinness, Amanda Byram	Keith Duffy (Note: Duffy's appearance as the magazine head was cut from the show due to time restraints but was included on the Morerer Juice outtake on the show's website.)	2.753
83	10	12 April 2012	Marcus Collins, Russell Kane	**Jonathan Ross** (Note: Fearne Cotton was not present for this episode due to personal commitments. Jonathan Ross stood in as team captain.), Chelsee Healey, Max Beesley	Lee MacDonald	3.058
84	11	19 April 2012 (Note: Camp vs. Cool special.)	Antony Cotton, Louie Spence	Katy B, Greg James	Diane Youdale	2.845
85	12	26 April 2012	Caroline Flack, Corey Feldman	Chris Ramsey, Eamonn Holmes	Michael Winslow	2.874
86	13	3 May 2012 (Note: Pop special.)	Frankie Sandford, Rizzle Kicks	Tinchy Stryder, Vanessa White	Lisa Maffia	2.766

=== Series 8 ===
This was the first series to feature Chris Ramsey as a regular panellist.

Episode no.	Series no.	Original air date	Guests		Hot Shit Magazine Head	UK viewers (millions) (incl. +1)
Episode no.	Series no.	Original air date	Holly's team	Fearne's team	Hot Shit Magazine Head	UK viewers (millions) (incl. +1)
88	1	30 August 2012	Greg Rutherford, Ronan Keating	Chris Ramsey, Kelly Brook	Zipparah Tafari	2.592
89	2	6 September 2012	James Argent, Emily Atack	Newton Faulkner, Jason Manford	Derrick Evans	2.175
90	3	13 September 2012	Jonnie Peacock, Coleen Nolan	Jason Biggs, Johnny Vegas	—N/a	2.602
91	4	20 September 2012	Example, Lisa Snowdon	Chris Ramsey, Mo Farah	James Crossley	2.329
92	5	27 September 2012	Joey Essex, Amir Khan	Jessica Ennis, Joe Lycett	—N/a	2.846
93	6	4 October 2012	Noel Clarke, Gino D'Acampo	Dynamo, Rick Edwards	Dynamo	2.467
94	7	11 October 2012	Spencer Matthews, Conor Maynard	Katie Price, Chris Ramsey	Erkan Mustafa	2.417
95	8	18 October 2012	Olly Murs, Caroline Flack, Paloma Faith	Tim Westwood, Rick Edwards	Christopher Biggins	2.333
96	9	25 October 2012 (Note: The Wanted special.)	Max George, Tom Parker, Nathan Sykes	Chris Ramsey, Siva Kaneswaran, Jay McGuiness	Eoghan Quigg	2.435
97	10	1 November 2012 (Note: Halloween special.)	Abbey Clancy, Fazer	Yvette Fielding, Joe Swash	—N/a	2.532
98	11	8 November 2012	Tom Fletcher, Dougie Poynter, Chris Moyles	Ashley Banjo, Melanie C	Neil Buchanan	2.271
99	12	6 December 2012 (Note: Little Mix special.)	Jesy Nelson, Perrie Edwards, Jade Thirlwall, Leigh-Anne Pinnock	Jason Manford, Verne Troyer	Tom Oliver	2.330
100	13	13 December 2012 (Note: "A Celebrity Juicemas Carol – Part 1" compilation episode.)	Compilation episode – best of Series 7 (Note: Although there were no panel guests in this episode, Wright appeared as the ghosts of Christmas past, present and future.)			1.982
101	14	20 December 2012 (Note: "A Celebrity Juicemas Carol – Part 2" compilation episode.)	Compilation episode – best of Series 8			1.494
102	15	21 December 2012 (Note: Text Santa special, broadcast on ITV.)	Davina McCall, Louis Smith, Aston Merrygold	Stacey Solomon, Simon Gregson	The Chuckle Brothers	2.030

=== Series 9 ===
Kelly Brook filled in as team captain this series while Fearne Cotton was absent due to being on maternity leave.

Episode no.	Series no.	Original air date	Guests		Tek a Brek Magazine Head	UK viewers (millions) (incl. +1)
Episode no.	Series no.	Original air date	Holly's team	Kelly's team	Tek a Brek Magazine Head	UK viewers (millions) (incl. +1)
103	1	28 February 2013	Marvin Humes, Geri Halliwell	Bruno Tonioli, Paddy McGuinness	Bruce Jones	2.449
104	2	7 March 2013	Ashley Roberts, William Roache	Ashleigh and Pudsey, Chris Ramsey	Abi Titmuss	2.233
105	3	14 March 2013 (Note: Hunks special.)	Theo Hutchcraft, Mark Wright	Henry Winkler, Vernon Kay	Mark Jenkins	2.125
106	4	21 March 2013	Kimberly Wyatt, Danny Dyer	Rylan Clark, Chris Ramsey	Christopher Maloney	2.444
107	5	28 March 2013 (Note: The Big Reunion special. Ritchie Neville, Antony Costa, Simon Webbe and Sean Conlon appeared as guests in the second part of the episode, swapping with Abz Love, Duncan James, Lee Ryan and Scott Robinson respectively. In other parts of the episode, these guests appeared in a "green room".)	Abz Love, Ritchie Neville, Jessica Taylor, Duncan James, Antony Costa	Lee Ryan, Simon Webbe, Liz McClarnon, Scott Robinson, Sean Conlon	Bradley McIntosh	2.231
108	6	4 April 2013	Millie Mackintosh, Nick Grimshaw	Gok Wan, Joe Lycett	John McCririck	2.373
109	7	11 April 2013	Stephen Mulhern, Sarah Harding	Joey Essex, Sam Faiers, Seann Walsh	Eddie "The Eagle" Edwards	2.330
110	8	18 April 2013	Tom Ellis, Helen Flanagan	Peter Andre, Chris Ramsey	Vanessa Feltz	2.227
111	9	25 April 2013	Ashley Banjo, Amelia Lily	Eamonn Holmes, Ruth Langsford, Rob Beckett	Neil Ruddock	2.276
112	10	2 May 2013 (Note: Coronation Street vs. EastEnders special.)	**Antony Cotton** (Note: As part of the Corrie vs. EastEnders Special, Holly Willoughby and Kelly Brook were both absent from this episode; instead Antony Cotton and Nitin Ganatra acted as team captains in their places, respectively.), Jack P. Shepherd, Brooke Vincent, Catherine Tyldesley	**Nitin Ganatra**, Charlie Brooks, Tameka Empson, Tony Discipline	Cheryl Fergison	2.053
113	11	9 May 2013	Greg James, Emma Bunton	Gemma Collins, Rick Edwards	—N/a	1.927
114	12	16 May 2013	Conor Maynard, Richard Madeley	Dermot O'Leary, Johnny Vegas	Cheryl Baker	2.182
115	13	23 May 2013	Myleene Klass, Wretch 32	Jaime Winstone, Dave Berry	Frankie Essex	2.332

=== Series 10 ===
Fearne Cotton returned to the series and this was the last series to feature Chris Ramsey as a regular panellist.

Episode no.	Series no.	Original air date	Guests			Graziarerer Magazine Head	UK viewers (millions) (incl. +1)
Episode no.	Series no.	Original air date	Holly's team	Fearne's team	Kelly's team	Graziarerer Magazine Head	UK viewers (millions) (incl. +1)
116	1	29 August 2013	Lucy Mecklenburgh, Amir Khan	Ashley Walters, Christian Jessen	—N/a	Dane Bowers	1.871
117	2	5 September 2013	Brian McFadden, Jason Derulo	Alex Jones, Rizzle Kicks	—N/a	Fil Henley	1.460
118	3	12 September 2013	Georgia May Foote, Richard Hammond	Kevin McHale, Example	—N/a	Dustin Diamond	1.506
119	4	19 September 2013	Gino D'Acampo, Charlotte Crosby	Carol Vorderman, Chris Ramsey	—N/a	Lauren Harries	1.628
120	5	26 September 2013	Ana Matronic, Mark Wright	**Phillip Schofield** (Note: As part of the This Morning-themed show, Fearne Cotton was absent from this episode, so Phillip Schofield filled in as team captain.), Christine Bleakley, Johnny Vegas	—N/a	—N/a	1.674
121	6	3 October 2013	Nathan Sykes, Jay McGuiness, Craig Revel Horwood	Kym Lomas, Chris Ramsey	—N/a	Frankie Cocozza	1.542
122	7	10 October 2013	Rita Simons, Samantha Womack, Kate Garraway	Professor Green, Jake Canuso	—N/a	Dave Benson Phillips	1.580
123	8	17 October 2013 (Note: The X Factor special.)	Caroline Flack, Nicole Scherzinger	Louis Walsh, Dermot O'Leary	—N/a	Andy Monk	1.968
124	9	24 October 2013	Andy Brown, Stacey Solomon	Victoria Silvstedt, Matt Richardson	—N/a	Shelley Smith	1.916
125	10	31 October 2013 (Note: Halloween special.)	Union J (Note: During the first half of the episode, Union J members George Shelley and Jaymi Hensley appeared on the panel whilst Josh Cuthbert and JJ Hamblett were in the "green room". They swapped places during the second half of the episode.), Emma Willis	Kara Tointon, Paddy McGuinness	—N/a	Derek Acorah	2.244
126	11	7 November 2013	Little Mix (Note: During the first half of the episode, Little Mix members Perrie Edwards and Leigh-Anne Pinnock appeared on the panel while Jade Thirlwall and Jesy Nelson were in the "green room". They swapped places during the second half of the episode.), Eamonn Holmes	**Danny Dyer** (Note: Fearne Cotton was absent from this episode as she was guest presenting The One Show, so Danny Dyer filled in as team captain.), Mark-Francis Vandelli, Chris Ramsey	—N/a	—N/a	1.895
127	12	14 November 2013	Aston Merrygold, Aled Jones	Shane Filan, Harry Judd, Dougie Poynter	—N/a	—N/a	1.865
128	13	12 December 2013 (Note: Christmas special.)	Vanessa White, Peter Andre	James Blunt, Jason Byrne	Olly Murs, Kim Wilde	—N/a	2.157
129	14	19 December 2013 (Note: "Parallel Juicyverse – Part 1" compilation episode.)	Compilation episode – best of Series 9				0.891
130	15	26 December 2013 (Note: "Parallel Juicyverse – Part 2" compilation episode.)	Compilation episode – best of Series 10				—N/a

=== Series 11 ===
Episode no.	Series no.	Original air date	Guests		Bloody 'Ell! Magazine Head	UK viewers (millions) (incl. +1)
Episode no.	Series no.	Original air date	Holly's team	Fearne's team	Bloody 'Ell! Magazine Head	UK viewers (millions) (incl. +1)
131	1	20 February 2014 (Note: Saturday Night Takeaway special.)	Ashley Roberts, Declan Donnelly	Anthony McPartlin, Rob Beckett	Lyndyann Barass	2.405
132	2	13 March 2014	Pixie Lott, Jason Gardiner	Kian Egan, Lee Ryan	Gaz Beadle	2.011
133	3	20 March 2014	Paloma Faith, Ronan Keating	Martine McCutcheon, Mark Wright	Brendan Sheerin	1.502
134	4	27 March 2014 (Note: The Big Reunion special. Kéllé Bryan from Eternal, Nicola Harrington from Girl Thing and Gareth Gates from 5th Story did not appear.)	Jade Jones, Andrez Harriott, Eternal, Girl Thing	Ben Adams, 5th Story	Edd the Duck	1.369
135	5	3 April 2014	Alex Brooker, Tom Daley	Sam Bailey, Joe Swash	Craig Phillips	1.788
136	6	10 April 2014	Ollie Locke, Matthew Wolfenden	John Newman, Keith Duffy	Wagner	1.762
137	7	17 April 2014	Jamie Laing, Laura Whitmore	Lethal Bizzle, Chris Ramsey	Stavros Flatley	1.816
138	8	24 April 2014	Antony Cotton, Jameela Jamil	Matthew Wright, Paddy McGuinness	Lionel Blair	1.802
139	9	1 May 2014	Rylan Clark, Caroline Flack	Katy B, Gino D'Acampo	Bobby Davro	1.672
140	10	8 May 2014	Charlotte Crosby, Fazer	Ricky Wilson, Chris Ramsey	Michelle Gayle	1.794
141	11	15 May 2014	Joey Essex, Michelle Keegan	Natalie Cassidy, Davina McCall	3T	1.821
142	12	22 May 2014 (Note: "The Special Special" compilation episode.)	Compilation episode – best of Series 11			1.313

=== Series 12 ===
Gino D'Acampo filled in as team captain this series while Holly Willoughby was absent after the first episode due to being on maternity leave.

Episode no.	Series no.	Original air date	Guests		UK viewers (millions) (incl. +1)
Episode no.	Series no.	Original air date	Gino's team	Fearne's team	UK viewers (millions) (incl. +1)
143	1	11 September 2014	**Holly Willoughby**, Jack P. Shepherd, James Argent	Tess Daly, Alex Brooker	1.249
144	2	18 September 2014	Katie Hopkins, Gabby Logan	James Jordan, Chris Ramsey	1.618
145	3	25 September 2014	Lauren Goodger, Dynamo	Alex James, Eamonn Holmes	1.535
146	4	2 October 2014	Chloe Sims, David Dickinson	Alison Hammond, Johnny Vegas	1.466
147	5	9 October 2014 (Note: The X Factor special.)	Emma Bunton, Mel B	**Louis Walsh** (Note: Louis Walsh stood in for Fearne Cotton as team captain for this The X Factor special.), Tulisa, Sarah-Jane Crawford	1.423
148	6	16 October 2014	Joe Swash, Melanie Sykes	Les Dennis, Samia Ghadie	1.632
149	7	23 October 2014	Charlotte Crosby, Hairy Bikers	Chloe-Jasmine Whichello, Craig Revel Horwood	1.748
150	8	30 October 2014 (Note: Halloween special.)	Richard Hammond, Jessie J	Jimmy Carr, Chris Ramsey	2.265
151	9	6 November 2014 (Note: McBusted special.)	Danny Jones, Tom Fletcher, James Bourne	Matt Willis, Dougie Poynter, Harry Judd	1.654
152	10	13 November 2014 (Note: This Morning vs Music special.)	Ruth Langsford, Phillip Schofield	Olly Murs, Peter Andre	1.846
153	11	11 December 2014 (Note: Christmas special.)	Joey Essex, Susanna Reid	Professor Green, Paddy McGuinness	2.032
154	12	18 December 2014 (Note: "Bestest Bits 2014" compilation episode.)	Compilation episode – best of Series 12		1.161
155	13	30 December 2014 (Note: "Unseen Celebrity Juice Tit Bits" compilation episode.)	Compilation episode – unseen clips from Series 11 and 12		1.093

=== Series 13 ===
Holly Willoughby returned to the series and this was the first series to feature Gino D'Acampo as a regular panellist.

Episode no.	Series no.	Original air date	Guests		UK viewers (millions) (incl. +1)
Episode no.	Series no.	Original air date	Holly's team	Fearne's team	UK viewers (millions) (incl. +1)
156	1	19 March 2015	Gino D'Acampo, Caroline Flack	Joey Essex, Jimmy Carr	1.503
157	2	26 March 2015	Johnny Vegas, Ashley Roberts	Dappy, Gino D'Acampo	1.460
158	3	2 April 2015 (Note: Easter special.)	Gino D'Acampo, Will Mellor	Kevin McHale, June Sarpong (Note: June Sarpong joined Fearne's team during the second part of this episode after the team won her place on the panel.), Rylan Clark	1.565
159	4	9 April 2015	Gino D'Acampo, Lisa Snowdon, Dave Berry	Christian Jessen, Stereo Kicks	1.437
160	5	16 April 2015	**Gino D'Acampo** (Note: Holly Willoughby was absent for this episode, so Gino D'Acampo filled in as team captain.), Vernon Kay, Jess Wright	Steve-O, Chris Ramsey	1.462
161	6	23 April 2015	Eamonn Holmes, Richard Osman	Denise van Outen, Gino D'Acampo	1.126
162	7	30 April 2015 (Note: Keith's Birthday Party special.)	Professor Green, Charlotte Crosby	Gino D'Acampo, Gok Wan	1.518
163	8	7 May 2015 (Note: Massive Election special.)	Chris Ramsey, Emma Willis, Ella Eyre, Joey Essex (Note: The concept of teams was absent for this episode. Instead, all panellists played on their own.)		1.202
164	9	14 May 2015 (Note: Normal special.)	Jimmy Bullard, Rochelle and Marvin Humes	Naughty Boy, Brooke Vincent	1.370
165	10	21 May 2015 (Note: End of Series special.)	Jimmy Carr, David Guetta	Charlotte Hawkins, Johnny Vegas	1.292

=== Series 14 ===
Gino D'Acampo filled in as team captain this series while Fearne Cotton was absent due to being on maternity leave.

Episode no.	Series no.	Original air date	Guests		UK viewers (millions) (incl. +1)
Episode no.	Series no.	Original air date	Holly's team	Gino's team	UK viewers (millions) (incl. +1)
166	1	10 September 2015	Jonathan Ross, Jamie Laing	Kellie Bright, Chris Ramsey	1.522
167	2	17 September 2015	Louis Walsh, Kelly Brook	Hayley Tamaddon, Jimmy Carr	1.169
168	3	24 September 2015 (Note: Ultimate #ThrowbackThursday special.)	Dean Gaffney, Verne Troyer	Tulisa, Chris Moyles	1.111
169	4	1 October 2015	Adam Richman, Foxes	Kelly Osbourne, Thomas Turgoose	1.242
170	5	8 October 2015	Ben Hanlin, Robert Rinder	Sara Cox, Rylan Clark	1.128
171	6	15 October 2015	Ben Haenow, John Newman	5 Seconds of Summer, Jameela Jamil	1.440
172	7	22 October 2015	**Joey Essex** (Note: Holly Willoughby was absent for this episode, so Joey Essex filled in as team captain.), Rochelle Humes, James Morrison	Caroline Flack, Ella Eyre	1.366
173	8	29 October 2015 (Note: Halloween special.)	Perrie Edwards, Jade Thirlwall, Adam Lambert	Johnny Vegas, Jesy Nelson, Leigh-Anne Pinnock	1.868
174	9	5 November 2015	Nathan Sykes, Jerry Springer	Jess Wright, Chris Kamara	1.456
175	10	12 November 2015	Paddy McGuinness, Frankie Bridge, James Martin	Jennifer Metcalfe, Chris Ramsey, Vernon Kay	1.442
176	11	10 December 2015 (Note: Christmas special.)	Jay McGuiness, Michelle Keegan	Louise Redknapp, Jimmy Carr	1.394
177	12	17 December 2015 (Note: "Bestest Bits 2015 – Part 1" compilation episode.)	Compilation episode – best of Series 13		0.528
178	13	23 December 2015 (Note: "Bestest Bits 2015 – Part 2" compilation episode.)	Compilation episode – best of Series 14		—N/a
179	14	30 December 2015 (Note: "Bestest of the Unseenest Bits" compilation episode.)	Compilation episode – unseen clips from Series 13 and 14		0.804

=== Series 15 ===
Fearne Cotton returned to the series.

Episode no.	Series no.	Original air date	Guests		UK viewers (millions) (incl. +1)
Episode no.	Series no.	Original air date	Holly's team	Fearne's team	UK viewers (millions) (incl. +1)
180	1	17 March 2016 (Note: Live special.)	Ricky Wilson, Phillip Schofield	Vicky Pattison, Gino D'Acampo	1.915
181	2	24 March 2016 (Note: Easter special.)	Gino D'Acampo, Johnny Vegas	Rylan Clark-Neal, Ferne McCann	1.549
182	3	31 March 2016	**Gino D'Acampo** (Note: Holly Willoughby was absent for this episode, so Gino D'Acampo filled in as team captain.), Charlotte Crosby, Caroline Flack	Shayne Ward, Paddy McGuinness	1.243
183	4	7 April 2016	Ashley Roberts, Dean Cain	Sid Owen, Will Mellor	1.245
184	5	14 April 2016	Ella Eyre, Fred Sirieix	Ben Fogle, Gino D'Acampo	1.018
185	6	21 April 2016	Zoë Ball, Danny Dyer	Reggie 'n' Bollie, Gino D'Acampo	1.244
186	7	28 April 2016 (Note: 80s special.)	Gino D'Acampo, Zach Galligan	Billy Ocean, Myleene Klass, Chris Kamara (Note: Chris Kamara joined Fearne's team during the second part of this episode.)	1.211
187	8	5 May 2016	Georgia May Foote, Joey Essex	Alex James, Gino D'Acampo	1.355
188	9	12 May 2016	Gino D'Acampo, Eamonn Holmes	Craig Revel Horwood, Chris Ramsey	1.278
189	10	19 May 2016	Jimmy Carr, Ayda Field	Rickie Haywood Williams, Melvin Odoom, Gino D'Acampo	1.433

=== Series 16 ===
Episode no.	Series no.	Original air date	Guests				UK viewers (millions) (incl. +1)
Episode no.	Series no.	Original air date	Holly's team	Fearne's team	Gino's team	Joe's team	UK viewers (millions) (incl. +1)
190	1	8 September 2016	Rylan Clark-Neal, Joe Wicks	Anastacia, Jonathan Ross	—N/a		1.479
191	2	15 September 2016	Fay Ripley, Gino D'Acampo	Tulisa, Martin Kemp	—N/a		1.332
192	3	22 September 2016	**Gino D'Acampo** (Note: Holly Willoughby was absent for this episode, so Gino D'Acampo filled in as team captain.), Aston Merrygold, Stephanie Pratt	Sue Cleaver, Fred Sirieix	—N/a		1.465
193	4	29 September 2016	Ollie Locke, John Thomson	Daisy Lowe, Johnny Vegas	—N/a		1.299
194	5	6 October 2016	Danny Miller, Johnny Vegas	Will Mellor, Danielle Armstrong	—N/a		1.299
195	6	13 October 2016 (Note: Couples special. In this episode there were four teams of two; Gino D'Acampo and Joe Swash acted as team captains alongside Holly Willoughby and Fearne Cotton.)	Phillip Schofield	Olly Murs	Pamela Anderson	Stacey Solomon	1.634
196	7	20 October 2016	**John Barrowman** (Note: Holly Willoughby was absent for this episode, so John Barrowman filled in as team captain.), Gino D'Acampo, Kieron Richardson	Vicky Pattison, Chris Ramsey	—N/a		1.344
197	8	27 October 2016 (Note: Halloween special.)	Joey Essex, Cher Lloyd	Ben Shephard, Gino D'Acampo	—N/a		2.123
198	9	3 November 2016	Gino D'Acampo, Louis Walsh	Megan McKenna, Pete Wicks, Jimmy Carr	—N/a		1.623
199	10	10 November 2016	Paddy McGuinness, Melvin Odoom, Melanie C	Rick Astley, Ricky Wilson, Gino D'Acampo	—N/a		1.465
200	11	8 December 2016 (Note: Christmas special.)	Gino D'Acampo, Piers Morgan	Danny Dyer, Susanna Reid	—N/a		2.039
201	12	15 December 2016 (Note: "Gogglyboxers" compilation episode.)	Compilation episode – best of Series 15				1.370
202	13	22 December 2016 (Note: "Xmas Gogglyboxers" compilation episode.)	Compilation episode – best of Series 16				0.852
203	14	29 December 2016 (Note: "Bestest Unseenest Bits" compilation episode.)	Compilation episode – unseen clips from Series 15 and 16				—N/a

=== Series 17 ===
Episode no.	Series no.	Original air date	Guests				UK viewers (millions) (incl. +1)
Episode no.	Series no.	Original air date	Holly's team		Fearne's team		UK viewers (millions) (incl. +1)
204	1	23 March 2017 (Note: Live special.)	Emma Bunton, Gino D'Acampo		Jonathan Ross, Scarlett Moffatt		1.240
205	2	30 March 2017	Gino D'Acampo, Pamela Anderson		Will Mellor, Jimmy Carr		1.011
206	3	6 April 2017	Rylan Clark-Neal, Melody Thornton		Tony Hadley, Gino D'Acampo		1.166
207	4	13 April 2017 (Note: Easter special.)	**Paddy McGuinness** (Note: Holly Willoughby was absent for this episode, so Paddy McGuinness filled in as team captain.), Gino D'Acampo, Pixie Lott		Paisley Billings, Steven "Sketch" Porter, Johnny Vegas		1.107
208	5	20 April 2017	**Gino D'Acampo** (Note: Holly Willoughby was absent for this episode, so Gino D'Acampo filled in as team captain.), Fred Sirieix, Andrea McLean		Patsy Palmer, Bobby-Cole Norris		1.160
209	6	27 April 2017 (Note: Couples special. In this episode there were four teams of two.)	Fearne Cotton, Holly Willoughby	Nik & Eva Speakman	Ruth Langsford, Eamonn Holmes	Catherine Tyldesley, Gino D'Acampo	1.416
210	7	4 May 2017	Paddy McGuinness, Brad Simpson, Connor Ball		**Gino D'Acampo** (Note: Fearne Cotton co-hosted this episode, so Gino D'Acampo filled in as team captain.), Kriss Akabusi, Jenny Powell, Jimmy Carr		1.433
211	8	11 May 2017	Phillip Schofield, Tommy Mallet, Georgia Kousoulou		Ore Oduba, Chris Ramsey		1.425
212	9	18 May 2017	Gino D'Acampo, Luke Pritchard, Peter Denton		Ella Eyre, Ricky Wilson, Joey Essex		1.188
213	10	25 May 2017	Gino D'Acampo, Jonathan Cheban		James Blunt, Vicky Pattison		1.279
214	11	8 June 2017 (Note: "Bestest Bits 2017" compilation episode.)	Compilation episode – best of Series 17				0.768

=== Series 18 ===
Episode no.	Series no.	Original air date	Guests		UK viewers (millions) (incl. +1)
Episode no.	Series no.	Original air date	Holly's team	Fearne's team	UK viewers (millions) (incl. +1)
215	1	14 September 2017	Kem Cetinay, Chris Hughes, Russell Tovey	Charli XCX, Johnny Vegas	1.418
216	2	21 September 2017	Jimmy Carr, Richard Blackwood	Paddy McGuinness, Mollie King	1.275
217	3	28 September 2017	Larry Lamb, George Lamb, Sarah Harding	Jimmy Carr, Paloma Faith	1.060
218	4	5 October 2017	**Will Mellor** (Note: Holly Willoughby was absent for this episode, so Will Mellor filled in as team captain.), Chris Ramsey, Scarlett Moffatt	James Argent, Tom Wilson, Shaun Ryder	1.076
219	5	12 October 2017	**Gino D'Acampo** (Note: Holly Willoughby was absent for this episode, so Gino D'Acampo filled in as team captain.), Marvin Humes, Rochelle Humes, Ricki Lake	Jesse Metcalfe, Ore Oduba	1.160
220	6	19 October 2017	**Bruno Tonioli** (Note: Holly Willoughby was absent for this episode, so Bruno Tonioli filled in as team captain.), Joe Swash, Stacey Solomon, Kelly Brook	Mark Labbett, Anne Hegerty, Chris Ramsey	1.191
221	7	26 October 2017 (Note: Halloween special)	Rylan Clark-Neal, Wayne Bridge, Frankie Bridge	Joey Essex, Gino D'Acampo	1.583
222	8	2 November 2017	**Ed Sheeran** (Note: Holly Willoughby was absent for this episode, so Ed Sheeran filled in as team captain.), Chris Ramsey, Chris Kamara	Louis Walsh, Nadia Sawalha	1.393
223	9	9 November 2017	**Johnny Vegas** (Note: Holly Willoughby was absent for this episode, so Johnny Vegas filled in as team captain.), Vicky Pattison, Ben Shephard	Louisa Johnson, Will Mellor	1.301
224	10	16 November 2017	Gino D'Acampo, Brian Conley	Emeli Sandé, Fred Sirieix	1.348
225	11	14 December 2017 (Note: Christmas special.)	Ricky Wilson, Stacey Solomon, John Barrowman	Denise van Outen, Alex James, Gino D'Acampo	1.504
226	12	21 December 2017 (Note: "The Sweetest Bits" compilation episode.)	Compilation episode – best of Series 18		0.768

=== Series 19 ===
This was the last series to feature Gino D'Acampo as a regular panellist.

Episode no.	Series no.	Original air date	Guests		UK viewers (millions) (incl. +1)
Episode no.	Series no.	Original air date	Holly's team	Fearne's team	UK viewers (millions) (incl. +1)
227	1	22 March 2018 (Note: Live special.)	Gino D'Acampo, Georgia Toffolo	Russell Brand, Chris Ramsey	1.125
228	2	29 March 2018 (Note: Easter special.)	Phillip Schofield, Rylan Clark-Neal	Courtney Act, Gino D'Acampo	1.113
229	3	5 April 2018	Gino D'Acampo, Lucy Fallon	Gok Wan, Jonathan Ross	1.056
230	4	12 April 2018	Shaun Ryder, Gary Lucy	Ella Eyre, Richard Blackwood	1.194
231	5	19 April 2018	**Gino D'Acampo**, (Note: Holly Willoughby was absent for this episode, so Gino D'Acampo filled in as team captain.) Chris Ramsey, Scarlett Moffatt	Jake Wood, Fred Sirieix	0.990
232	6	26 April 2018	Gino D'Acampo, Maya Jama	John Newman, Stacey Solomon, Joe Swash	1.105
233	7	3 May 2018	Chris Kamara, Rochelle Humes, Joey Essex	Anne-Marie, Gino D'Acampo, Ricky Wilson	0.993
234	8	10 May 2018	Paddy McGuinness, Emma Bunton	Nick Grimshaw, Dermot O'Leary	1.130
235	9	17 May 2018	Johnny Vegas, Shirley Ballas	Big Narstie, Will Mellor	1.083
236	10	24 May 2018	Iain Stirling, Caroline Flack, Lisa Stansfield	Joel Dommett, Mark Wright	1.131
237	11	7 June 2018 (Note: "Just the Tip" compilation episode.)	Compilation episode – best of Series 19		0.782

=== Series 20 ===
This was the last series to feature Fearne Cotton as a team captain.

Episode no.	Series no.	Original air date	Guests		UK viewers (millions) (incl. +1)
Episode no.	Series no.	Original air date	Holly's team	Fearne's team	UK viewers (millions) (incl. +1)
238	1	13 September 2018 (Note: 10th birthday special.)	Paddy McGuinness, Jack Fincham, Dani Dyer	Danny Dyer, Ashley Roberts	1.299
239	2	20 September 2018	Rak-Su, Catherine Tyldesley	Eamonn Holmes (Note: A power cut occurred during the recording of this episode which meant filming was postponed. The rescheduled recording did not feature Holmes and his place on the panel was taken by John Thomson.), Joel Dommett	0.910
240	3	27 September 2018	Jonathan Ross, Sid Owen	Kate Nash, Rylan Clark-Neal	0.882
241	4	4 October 2018 (Note: Pop special.)	Will Mellor, Olly Murs	Tom Odell, Gabrielle	1.019
242	5	11 October 2018	John Barrowman, Jordan Banjo	Suggs, Lucy Fallon	0.927
243	6	18 October 2018	Jimmy Carr, Nadine Coyle	Simon Rimmer, Tim Lovejoy, Ricky Wilson	0.993
244	7	25 October 2018 (Note: Halloween special.)	Gino D'Acampo, Danny Jones	Stacey Solomon, Joe Swash, Richard Blackwood	0.888
245	8	1 November 2018 (Note: Boys vs. Girls special.)	**Rita Ora** (Note: As part of the Boys vs. Girls Special, Holly Willoughby and Fearne Cotton were both absent from this episode; instead Rita Ora and Chris Ramsey acted as team captains in their places, respectively.), Jaime Winstone, Alexa Chung	**Chris Ramsey**, Joey Essex, Richard Blackwood	1.034
246	9	8 November 2018	**Jimmy Carr** (Note: Holly Willoughby was absent for this episode, so Jimmy Carr filled in as team captain.), Brian McFadden, Katherine Ryan	Jordan Stephens, Maya Jama, Joel Dommett	0.954
247	10	15 November 2018	**Gino D'Acampo** (Note: Holly Willoughby and Fearne Cotton were both absent from this episode; instead Gino D'Acampo and Fred Sirieix acted as team captains in their places, respectively.), Johnny Vegas, Kimberley Walsh	**Fred Sirieix**, Craig Revel Horwood, Rochelle Humes, Marvin Humes	0.864
248	11	13 December 2018 (Note: Christmas special.)	**Jimmy Carr**, Gino D'Acampo, Stacey Solomon, Carol Vorderman	Ayda Field, Courtney Act, Joey Essex	1.096
249	12	20 December 2018 (Note: "Ten Years of Best Bits" compilation episode.)	Compilation episode – best of Series 1–20		0.827

=== Series 21 ===
This was both the only series to feature Paddy McGuinness as a team captain and Stacey Solomon as a regular panellist.

Episode no.	Series no.	Original air date	Guests		UK viewers (millions) (incl. +1)
Episode no.	Series no.	Original air date	Holly's team	Paddy's team	UK viewers (millions) (incl. +1)
250	1	21 March 2019	John Barrowman, Emily Atack	Howard Donald, Mark Wright	0.833
251	2	28 March 2019	Will Mellor, Samia Longchambon	Stacey Solomon, Joel Dommett	0.893
252	3	4 April 2019	Kate Nash, Maverick Sabre	**Stacey Solomon** (Note: Paddy McGuinness was absent for this episode, so Stacey Solomon filled in as team captain.), Laurence Fox, Chris Ramsey	0.705
253	4	11 April 2019	Gemma Collins, James Argent, Richard Arnold	John Newman, Michelle Visage	0.793
254	5	18 April 2019 (Note: Easter special.)	Will Mellor, Bebe Rexha	Sair Khan, Johnny Vegas	0.767
255	6	25 April 2019	**Emilia Fox** (Note: Holly Willoughby was absent for this episode, so Emilia Fox filled in as team captain.), Stacey Solomon, Joel Dommett, Tom Read Wilson	Angela Scanlon, Ore Oduba, Richard Blackwood	0.786
256	7	2 May 2019	**Amanda Holden** (Note: Holly Willoughby was absent for this episode, so Amanda Holden filled in as team captain.), Max Beesley, Emily Atack	Brad Simpson, James McVey, Patsy Kensit	0.616
257	8	9 May 2019	**Amanda Holden**, Jimmy Carr, Rob Mallard, Katie McGlynn	James Morrison, Charlotte Hawkins, Chris Ramsey	0.827
258	9	16 May 2019	Jimmy Carr, Anita Rani	Stefflon Don, Jaime Winstone	0.876
259	10	23 May 2019	Joe Swash, Stacey Solomon, Mel B	Susanna Reid, Marvin Humes	0.702
260	11	4 June 2019	Compilation episode – best of Series 21 and an interview with Keith Lemon by Richard Arnold		0.782

=== Series 22 ===
This was the first series to feature Mel B as a team captain.

Episode no.	Series no.	Original air date	Guests		UK viewers (millions) (incl. +1)
Episode no.	Series no.	Original air date	Holly's team	Mel's team	UK viewers (millions) (incl. +1)
261	1	10 October 2019	Richard Arnold, James Blunt	Mark Wright, Katherine Ryan	0.835
262	2	17 October 2019	John Thomson, Louise Redknapp	Adam Lambert, Will Mellor	0.771
263	3	24 October 2019	Denise van Outen, Maura Higgins	Emilia Fox, Gemma Collins	0.906
264	4	31 October 2019 (Note: Halloween special.)	Will Mellor, Tan France	Anna Richardson, Paddy McGuinness	0.919
265	5	7 November 2019	Angela Scanlon, Ayda Williams, Phil Daniels	Dani Dyer, Craig Revel Horwood, Joe Swash	0.850
266	6	14 November 2019	**Amanda Holden** (Note: Holly Willoughby was absent from this episode, so Amanda Holden filled in as team captain.), Tom Fletcher, Danny Jones, Joey Essex	Megan McKenna, Harry Judd, Dougie Poynter	0.917
267	7	12 December 2019 (Note: Christmas special.)	Paddy McGuinness, Stacey Solomon	Kelly Osbourne, Gino D'Acampo, Will Mellor	0.793
268	8	19 December 2019 (Note: "Trapped and Alone" compilation episode.)	Compilation episode – best of Series 22		—N/a

=== Series 23 ===
This was the last series to feature Holly Willoughby and Mel B as team captains.

Episode no.	Series no.	Original air date	Guests		UK viewers (millions) (incl. +1)
Episode no.	Series no.	Original air date	Holly's team	Mel's team	UK viewers (millions) (incl. +1)
269	1	9 April 2020	Nadine Coyle, AJ Pritchard, Curtis Pritchard	Emily Atack, Will Mellor	0.615
270	2	16 April 2020	**Howard Donald** (Note: Holly Willoughby was absent from this episode, so Howard Donald filled in as team captain.), The Vivienne, Cheryl Hole, Anne-Marie	Fleur East, Joey Essex, John Barrowman	0.476
271	3	23 April 2020	**Howard Donald**, Joey Essex, Kimberly Wyatt, Ashley Roberts	Kimberley Walsh, Jay McGuiness, Johnny Vegas	0.433
272	4	30 April 2020 (Note: Lockdown special. These are virtual episodes using video chat. This was due to the COVID-19 pandemic affecting production.)	Chris Kamara, Roman Kemp	Ruth Langsford, Eamonn Holmes, Mark Wright	0.545
273	5	7 May 2020	Emily Atack, Matt Goss	Ben Shephard, Laura Whitmore	0.484
274	6	14 May 2020 (Note: Let's See Your Best Bits compilation episode.)	Compilation Episode – best of Joey Essex, Mel B, John Barrowman and Holly Willoughby		0.390

=== Series 24 ===
This was the first series to feature Emily Atack and Laura Whitmore as team captains.

Episode no.	Series no.	Original air date	Guests		UK viewers (millions) (incl. +1)
Episode no.	Series no.	Original air date	Emily's team	Laura's team	UK viewers (millions) (incl. +1)
275	1	22 October 2020	Tom Grennan, Will Mellor	Alan Carr, Jimmy Carr	0.673
276	2	29 October 2020 (Note: Halloween special.)	Craig Revel Horwood, Jason Donovan	Mark Owen, Howard Donald	0.620
277	3	5 November 2020	Brad Simpson, Connor Ball	Rochelle Humes, Marvin Humes	0.494
278	4	12 November 2020	Joel Dommett, Lance Bass	Shane Lynch, Ronan Keating	0.483
279	5	19 November 2020	Pete Wicks, Joe Swash	Wes Nelson, Kem Cetinay	0.507
280	6	26 November 2020	Divina de Campo, The Vivienne	Ella Eyre, Zara Larsson	0.531
281	7	3 December 2020	Roman Kemp, Richard Blackwood	Ian "H" Watkins, Chris Harris	0.516
282	8	10 December 2020	Claire Richards, Michelle Visage	Joel Dommett, Jimmy Carr	0.468
283	9	17 December 2020 (Note: Christmas special.)	Paddy McGuinness, Rhys Nicholson	Chris Kamara, Ricky Wilson	0.506
284	10	27 December 2020 (Note: "The Boris Briefing" compilation episode.)	Compilation episode – best of series 24		N/A (<0.640) (Note: Not reported in the weekly top 15 programmes for four-screen viewer ratings.)

=== Series 25 ===
This series featured Maya Jama as a regular panellist.

Episode no.	Series no.	Original air date	Guests		UK viewers (millions) (incl. +1)
Episode no.	Series no.	Original air date	Emily's team	Laura's team	UK viewers (millions) (incl. +1)
285	1	8 April 2021	Roman Kemp, Judi Love	Shirley Ballas, Jamie Laing	0.593
286	2	15 April 2021	John Barrowman, Sophie Ellis-Bextor	Jordan North, Maya Jama	0.438
287	3	22 April 2021	Tom Grennan, Raye	Big Narstie, Nick Grimshaw	0.516
288	4	29 April 2021	HRVY, Maya Jama	Howard Donald, Rebekah Vardy	0.430
289	5	6 May 2021	Eamonn Holmes, Maya Jama	Jimmy Carr, Ella Henderson	0.494
290	6	13 May 2021	Maya Jama, Joe Swash	Alex Brooker, Michelle Visage	0.492
291	7	20 May 2021	Maya Jama, Catherine Tyldesley	Lawrence Chaney, Katherine Ryan	0.502
292	8	27 May 2021	Maya Jama, Mark Wright	Will Mellor, Melvin Odoom	0.309
293	9	31 October 2021 (Note: Halloween special.)	Nick Grimshaw, Maisie Smith	Maya Jama, Jordan North	0.354 (Note: Excludes viewership on PCs, tablets and smartphones.)
294	10	16 December 2021 (Note: Christmas special.)	Ronan Keating, Johnny Vegas	Richard Blackwood, Katherine Ryan	—N/a

=== Series 26 ===
Episode no.	Series no.	Original air date	Guests		UK viewers (millions) (incl. +1)
Episode no.	Series no.	Original air date	Emily's team	Laura's team	UK viewers (millions) (incl. +1)
295	1	24 March 2022	Jonathan Ross, Ella Henderson	Big Narstie, Craig Revel Horwood	0.301
296	2	31 March 2022	Nick Grimshaw, Vernon Kay	Fleur East, Rickie Haywood-Williams	0.250
297	3	7 April 2022	Johnny Vegas, Aitch	Rachel Riley, Raye	0.242
298	4	14 April 2022	Joe Swash, Ashley Roberts	AJ Odudu, Howard Donald	0.226
299	5	21 April 2022	Jordan North, Frankie Bridge	Vick Hope, Tom Grennan	0.281
300	6	28 April 2022	Joel Dommett, Katherine Ryan	Verona Rose, Will Mellor	0.178
301	7	5 May 2022	Melvin Odoom, Shirley Ballas	Chelcee Grimes, The Vivienne	0.204
302	8	12 May 2022	Majestic, Megan McKenna	Chris Eubank, Jamie Laing	0.285
303	9	19 May 2022	**Katherine Ryan** (Note: Emily Atack was absent from these episodes, therefore Katherine Ryan stood in as team captain.), AJ Odudu, Joel Corry	Aston Merrygold, Tom Read Wilson	0.256
304	10	26 May 2022	**Katherine Ryan**, Jordan North, Becky Hill	Mark Labbett, Big Zuu	0.284

=== Specials ===
Episode no.	Series no.	Original air date	Guests		Magazine Head	UK viewers (millions) (incl. +1)
Episode no.	Series no.	Original air date	Holly's team	Fearne's team	Magazine Head	UK viewers (millions) (incl. +1)
47	1	5 March 2011 (Note: A special stand-alone episode was filmed on 5 March 2011, as part of Comic Relief's special 24 Hour Panel People featuring David Walliams, who appeared in various old and new panel game shows throughout a 24-hour period. The various shows were streamed live on the Red Nose Day website, and parts of each show were shown during five half-hour specials on Comic Relief night. The teams were captained by Germaine Greer and Lauren Laverne. On Greer's team were Jedward and on Laverne's team were Rufus Hound and David Walliams, while Brian Belo appeared as the 'Morerer Magazine Head' for the episode.)	**Germaine Greer**, Jedward	**Lauren Laverne**, David Walliams	Brian Belo	—N/a
79	2	19 March 2012 (Note: A special stand-alone episode was filmed with the guests of Episode 4 of the seventh series, and broadcast as part of the Sport Relief telethon on 19 March 2012. The episode featured out-takes of the original episode, with guests Harry Judd, Dougie Poynter, Andrew Flintoff and David Hasselhoff, and featured a special round, entitled "What Are You Packing". Swimmer Mark Foster appeared as a special guest, coming out as a special "Strikerer" magazine head.)	Harry Judd, Dougie Poynter, Andrew Flintoff	David Hasselhoff	Mark Foster	—N/a
87	3	23 August 2012 (Note: A special episode was filmed and broadcast live as part of the 2012 Edinburgh TV festival, in which Lemon challenged a group of television executives against each other in the usual format. Cotton was unable to attend filming due to her pregnancy so Emma Bunton took her place instead. The episode was broadcast online, and has never been shown on TV.)	Ash Atalla, Daisy Goodwin	**Emma Bunton**, Peter Fincham, Zai Bennett	John McCririck	—N/a
Episode no.	Series no.	Original air date	Guests			UK viewers (millions) (incl. +1)
Episode no.	Series no.	Original air date	Emily's team	Laura's team		UK viewers (millions) (incl. +1)
305	1	8 December 2022	Will Mellor, Big Narstie, Holly Willoughby, Joey Essex	Chris Ramsey, Maya Jama, Fearne Cotton, Joe Swash	Holly Willoughby, Fearne Cotton	—N/a
306	2	15 December 2022	Compilation episode			—N/a
