= The Hot Desk =

- Genre: Entertainment
- Directed by: Chris Gillett; Joe Evans
- Presented by: See full list
- Country of origin: United Kingdom
- Original language: English
- No. of series: 11
- No. of episodes: 66

Production
- Executive producers: Stephanie Denington; Faith Guoga
- Running time: 8–10 minutes

Original release
- Network: ITV2
- Release: 15 November 2007 – 24 March 2017

The Hot Desk is a British music interview show that has been hosted by a number of presenters including Nicole Appleton, Melanie Blatt, Dave Berry, Emma Willis, Laura Whitmore, Sarah Jane Crawford and Alice Levine. The show was produced for ITV by UMTV.TV.

The Hot Desk first appeared on ITV Mobile in November 2007 and represented ITV Mobile's first made-for-mobile commission. Since 2008, it has been shown on ITV2. The show was launched with Mel Blatt and Nicole Appleton interviewing Liam Gallagher (who was in a relationship with Appleton at the time). Filmed on London's Hampstead Heath, Liam was less than complimentary about Peter Andre in his usual inimitable style.

== Format ==
Since the show's early "edgy feel" mix of new bands and no-holds-barred style approach, the show became less focused on new talent and more celebrity-led. One format question asked to every guest was 'call, text or reject' where the guest is given three people related to their lives, one they call, one they have to text and the other they must reject.

At the end of each interview, the celebrity featured was asked to sign the "Hot Desk" with a marker pen. This is reminiscent of TFI Friday, the television show hosted by Chris Evans which ran from 1996 to 2000. When Evans finished his interviews, he would also ask the celebrity to sign the desk with a marker pen. This format provided the producer with great access to the biggest music stars and A-list celebrities.

== Presenters ==
- Nicole Appleton (2007–2010)
- Melanie Blatt (2007–2010)
- Dave Berry (2008–2014, 2017)
- Emma Willis (2008–2014)
- Jayne Sharp (2011)
- Laura Whitmore (2012–2016)
- Alice Levine (2012–2013)
- Arazou Baker (2013)
- Dan O'Connell (2013)
- Melvin Odoom (2014, 2016)
- Rickie Haywood Williams (2014, 2016)
- Matt Willis (2014)
- Sarah-Jane Crawford (2014)
- Pixie Lott (2014)
- AJ Odudu (2015–2016)
- Poppy Jamie (2015–2016)
- Becca Dudley (2016)
- Maya Jama (2016)
- Roman Kemp (2016–2017)
- Vick Hope (2016)

== Episodes ==
=== 2007 ===
| Original air date | Guest | Presenter(s) |
|---|---|---|
| 15 November 2007 | Liam Gallagher | Melanie Blatt and Nicole Appleton |

=== 2008 ===
| Original air date | Guest | Presenter(s) |
|---|---|---|
| 2008 | The Hoosiers | Melanie Blatt and Nicole Appleton |
| 2008 | Johnny Vegas | Melanie Blatt and Nicole Appleton |
| 2008 | The Saturdays | Dave Berry |
| 2008 | McFly | Emma Willis |

=== 2009 ===
| Original air date | Guest | Presenter(s) |
|---|---|---|
| 2 de noviembre del 2009 | Taylor Swift | Dave Berry |
| 2009 | Akon | Melanie Blatt and Nicole Appleton |
| 2009 | Kelly Clarkson | Dave Berry |
| 2009 | Peter Andre | Emma Willis |
| 2009 | Seann William Scott | Dave Berry |
| 2009 | Lily Allen | Dave Berry |
| 2009 | Marilyn Manson | Melanie Blatt and Nicole Appleton |
| 21 July 2009 | Liam Gallagher | Melanie Blatt and Nicole Appleton |

=== 2010 ===
| Original air date | Guest | Presenter(s) |
|---|---|---|
| 2010 | Russell Brand | Melanie Blatt and Nicole Appleton |
| 2010 | Paloma Faith | Dave Berry |
| 2010 | The Vampire Diaries | Melanie Blatt and Nicole Appleton |
| 2010 | Ed Westwick | Emma Willis |
| 2010 | Alexandra Burke | Dave Berry |

=== 2011 ===
| Original air date | Guest | Presenter(s) |
|---|---|---|
| 2011 | Ellie Goulding | Dave Berry |
| 2011 | Kelly Rowland | Jayne Sharp |
| 2011 | Matt Cardle | Dave Berry |
| 2011 | Olly Murs | Jayne Sharp |
| 2011 | Sugababes | Dave Berry |
| 1 November 2011 | One Direction | Emma Willis |
| 2011 | Jessie J | Dave Berry |

=== 2012 ===
| Original air date | Guest | Presenter(s) |
|---|---|---|
| 22 September 2012 | Pink | Alice Levine |
| 2012 | Usher | Emma Willis |
| 2012 | Rita Ora | Dave Berry |
| 2012 | Little Mix | Alice Levine |
| 2012 | Professor Green | Laura Whitmore |
| 2012 | Tulisa Contostavlos | Laura Whitmore |
| 2012 | Nicki Minaj | Dave Berry |

=== 2013 ===
| Original air date | Guest | Presenter(s) |
|---|---|---|
| 2013 | Ke$ha | Dave Berry |
| 2013 | Rizzle Kicks | Arazou Baker |
| 2013 | Keith Lemon | Laura Whitmore |
| 2013 | Union J | Alice Levine |
| 2013 | Tinie Tempah | Laura Whitmore |
| 2013 | Kodaline | Dan O'Connell |

=== 2014 ===
| Original air date | Guest | Presenter(s) |
|---|---|---|
| 2014 | Mark Ronson | Melvin Odoom and Rickie Haywood Williams |
| 2014 | Ashley Roberts | Laura Whitmore |
| 19 August 2014 | Kylie Minogue | Emma Willis |
| 2014 | Pixie Lott | Dave Berry |
| 2014 | The Vamps | Pixie Lott |
| 2014 | Rixton | Laura Whitmore |
| 16 November 2014 | McBusted | Matt Willis |
| 2014 | Neon Jungle | Sarah-Jane Crawford |
| 2014 | Nicole Scherzinger | Laura Whitmore |

=== 2015 ===
| Original air date | Guest | Presenter(s) |
|---|---|---|
| 2015 | Alesha Dixon | Laura Whitmore |
| 2015 | Meghan Trainor | AJ Odudu |
| 2015 | Fleur East | AJ Odudu |
| 28 February 2015 | Blue | Poppy Jamie |
| 10 March 2015 | Kelly Clarkson | Laura Whitmore |
| 21 March 2015 | Ella Henderson | AJ Odudu |
| 28 March 2015 | Ed Sheeran | Laura Whitmore |

=== 2016 ===
| Original air date | Guest | Presenter(s) |
|---|---|---|
| 11 January 2016 | Ella Eyre | Rickie Haywood Williams and Melvin Odoom |
| 11 January 2016 | Nick Jonas | AJ Odudu |
| 28 April 2016 | DNCE | Becca Dudley |
| 10 May 2016 | Adam Lambert | Laura Whitmore |
| 15 May 2016 | Nathan Sykes | Maya Jama |
| 27 May 2016 | Zara Larsson | Laura Whitmore |
| 29 May 2016 | Caroline Flack | Laura Whitmore |
| 2016 | Vicky Pattison | Vick Hope |
| 2016 | Busted | Becca Dudley |
| 22 October 2016 | Louisa Johnson | Roman Kemp |

=== 2017 ===
| Original air date | Guest | Presenter(s) |
|---|---|---|
| 2017 | The Vamps | Roman Kemp |
| 24 March 2017 | Emma Willis | Dave Berry |
