= Celebrity Juice =

British television comedy panel game

- Genre: Comedy; Panel show
- Created by: Leigh Francis
- Directed by: Toby Baker; Ollie Bartlett
- Presented by: Leigh Francis
- Starring: Holly Willoughby; Fearne Cotton; Rufus Hound; Chris Ramsey; Kelly Brook; Gino D'Acampo; Paddy McGuinness; Stacey Solomon; Mel B; Laura Whitmore; Emily Atack; Maya Jama
- Country of origin: United Kingdom
- Original language: English
- No. of series: 26
- No. of episodes: 306 (list of episodes)

Production
- Executive producers: Dan Baldwin; Leon Wilson; Junior Courtney; Victoria Payne; Jonno Richards; Jessie Swanson; Jonathan M. Singer
- Producers: Ed Thomas; Neil Calow; David Maguire; Nick Jarvie; Claire Fort
- Production locations: Riverside Studios (series 1–11); BBC Elstree Centre (series 12–15, 25–26); Television Centre, London (series 16–21); Elstree Studios (series 22–24); Pinewood Studios (2022 specials)
- Running time: 30–60 minutes (inc. advertisements)
- Production companies: Talkback Thames (2008–2011); Talkback (2012–2022)

Original release
- Network: ITV2
- Release: 24 September 2008 – 15 December 2022

Related
- Keith Lemon's LemonAid; Lemon La Vida Loca; Through the Keyhole

Celebrity Juice is a British television comedy panel game show broadcast on ITV2 between 24 September 2008 and 15 December 2022. The show was written and presented by Leigh Francis in the role of his alter ego Keith Lemon. The format for the series was first suggested in 2007, after the final series of Francis's Channel 4 sketch show Bo' Selecta!. ITV approached him to create a show featuring Lemon, and after the success of the five-part series Keith Lemon's Very Brilliant World Tour, the channel commissioned Celebrity Juice. The original premise of the show was to see which team knows most about the week's tabloid news stories, although later series focus more on the comedy factor of the participating celebrity guests and games involving them, rather than discussing the week's news.

Fearne Cotton and Holly Willoughby were the show's original team captains. In December 2018, Cotton announced that she would leave the series after ten years in order to pursue other projects. She was replaced by Paddy McGuinness, though he left after one series and was replaced by Mel B. On 4 May 2020, Willoughby revealed her decision to quit the series after 12 years on the show. She made her final appearance as team captain at the end of the 23rd series. Mel B also departed at the end of series 23. On 10 September 2020, it was announced that Laura Whitmore and Emily Atack had joined the show as team captains. On 29 March 2021, it was announced that Maya Jama had joined the show as a regular panellist. In December 2021, Celebrity Juice became one of three shows by Francis to get recommissioned for 2022, along with ITV2's Shopping with Keith Lemon and the E4/Channel 4 mockumentary series, The Holden Girls: Mandy & Myrtle.

On 29 June 2022, it was announced that Celebrity Juice had been cancelled by ITV; the series concluded with two specials which aired on 8 and 15 December 2022.

== Production ==
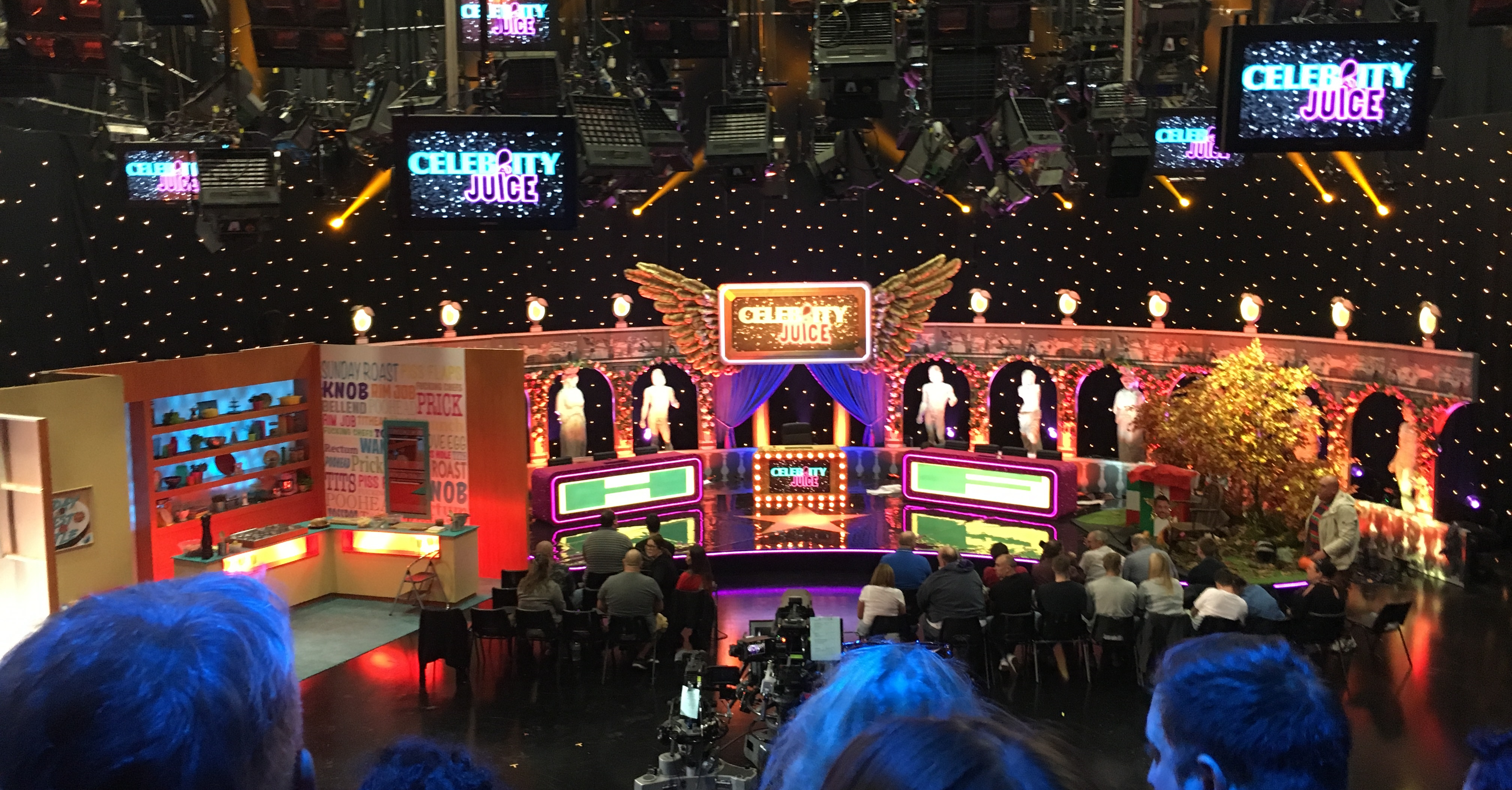
Celebrity Juice set in 2018

Celebrity Juice was filmed at the Riverside Studios from 2008 until 2014. In August 2014 it was announced that the show, along with the BBC's Never Mind the Buzzcocks and Sweat the Small Stuff, would be hosted at Elstree Studios Stage 9 whilst redevelopment takes place at their former home. For its first seven series, the show was produced by Talkback Thames, and it has been produced by Talkback since series eight (the same production company, but rebranded). The show is produced by Dan Baldwin and Leon Wilson.

== Transmissions ==
Series	Episodes	Originally aired		Team captains		Regular panellist
Series	Episodes	Series premiere	Series finale	Team captains		Regular panellist
1	8	24 September 2008	12 November 2008	Fearne Cotton	Holly Willoughby	—N/a
2	10	25 February 2009	29 April 2009	Fearne Cotton	Holly Willoughby	Rufus Hound
3	10	18 March 2010	20 May 2010	Fearne Cotton	Holly Willoughby	Rufus Hound
4	14	9 September 2010	30 December 2010	Fearne Cotton	Holly Willoughby	Rufus Hound
5	16	10 February 2011	26 May 2011	Fearne Cotton	Holly Willoughby	Rufus Hound
6	13	1 September 2011	29 December 2011	Fearne Cotton	Holly Willoughby	Rufus Hound
7	13	9 February 2012	3 May 2012	Fearne Cotton	Holly Willoughby	Rufus Hound
8	15	30 August 2012	21 December 2012	Fearne Cotton	Holly Willoughby	Chris Ramsey
9	13	28 February 2013	23 May 2013	Kelly Brook	Holly Willoughby	Chris Ramsey
10	15	29 August 2013	26 December 2013	Fearne Cotton	Holly Willoughby	Chris Ramsey
11	12	20 February 2014	22 May 2014	Fearne Cotton	Holly Willoughby	—N/a
12	13	11 September 2014	30 December 2014	Fearne Cotton	Gino D'Acampo	—N/a
13	10	19 March 2015	21 May 2015	Fearne Cotton	Holly Willoughby	Gino D'Acampo
14	14	10 September 2015	30 December 2015	Gino D'Acampo	Holly Willoughby	—N/a
15	10	17 March 2016	19 May 2016	Fearne Cotton	Holly Willoughby	Gino D'Acampo
16	14	8 September 2016	29 December 2016	Fearne Cotton	Holly Willoughby	Gino D'Acampo
17	11	23 March 2017	8 June 2017	Fearne Cotton	Holly Willoughby	Gino D'Acampo
18	12	14 September 2017	21 December 2017	Fearne Cotton	Holly Willoughby	Gino D'Acampo
19	11	22 March 2018	7 June 2018	Fearne Cotton	Holly Willoughby	Gino D'Acampo
20	12	13 September 2018	20 December 2018	Fearne Cotton	Holly Willoughby	Gino D'Acampo
21	10	21 March 2019	23 May 2019	Paddy McGuinness	Holly Willoughby	Stacey Solomon
22	8	10 October 2019	19 December 2019	Mel B	Holly Willoughby	—N/a
23	6	9 April 2020	14 May 2020	Mel B	Holly Willoughby	—N/a
24	10	22 October 2020	27 December 2020	Laura Whitmore	Emily Atack	—N/a
25	10	8 April 2021	16 December 2021	Laura Whitmore	Emily Atack	Maya Jama
26	10	24 March 2022	26 May 2022	Laura Whitmore	Emily Atack	—N/a
Specials	2	8 December 2022	15 December 2022	Laura Whitmore	Emily Atack	—N/a

== Merchandise ==
- A Celebrity Juice calendar was released by Danilo Promotions (22 September 2012), it features 68 pages of classic moments from the show.
- A Celebrity Juice book was released by Orion (26 September 2013). It features 160 pages and was published on a hardback format and kindle version.

== Home media ==
=== DVD and Blu-ray releases ===
Title	No. of disc(s)	Year	No. of episodes	DVD release	Blu-ray release
Title	No. of disc(s)	Year	No. of episodes	Region 2	Region B
Celebrity Juice – Too Juicy for TV	1	2008, 2009 & 2010	Best bits from series 1–3 and various unseen footage	21 November 2011	–
Celebrity Juice – Too Juicy for TV 2	1	2010 & 2011	Best bits from series 4–6 and various unseen footage	19 November 2012	19 November 2012
Celebrity Juice – The Bang Tidy Box Set: Too Juicy for TV 1 & 2	3	2008, 2009, 2010 & 2011	Best bits from series 1–6 and various unseen footage	19 November 2012	–
Celebrity Juice: Obscene and Unseen	1	2012 & 2013	Best bits from series 7–9 and various unseen footage	4 November 2013	–
Celebrity Juice: T'Box Set	4	2008, 2009, 2010, 2011, 2012 & 2013	Best bits from series 1–9 and various unseen footage	4 November 2013	–

=== Online ===
- Celebrity Juice was previously released on Netflix, although only selected episodes from series seven were available
- On iTunes Series 5, 6, 7, 8, 9, 10, 11 and aired episodes from Series 12 as well as Too Juicy for TV.

== Reception ==
=== Critical reception ===
In 2009, 2010 and 2011, the show was voted "Worst British TV Panel Show" in the British Comedy Guide's annual awards. In 2011, the show won the Best Entertainment Show Award at the TV Choice Awards and in 2012, it won an National Television Award for Best Comedy Panel Show and a BAFTA Award for the Best YouTube Audience.

=== Awards ===
Year	Award	Category	Result
2011	TV Choice Awards	Best Entertainment Show	Won
2011	British Comedy Awards	Best Comedy Panel Show	Nominated
2012	TV Choice Awards	Best Entertainment Show	Won
2012	National Television Awards	Most Popular Comedy Panel Show	Won
2012	British Comedy Awards	Best Comedy Entertainment Programme	Nominated
2012	BAFTA	YouTube Audience	Won
2013	National Television Awards	Most Popular Entertainment Presenter	Nominated
2013	Television and Radio Industries Club Awards	TV Satellite/Digital Programme	Won
2015	National Television Awards	Multichannel	Won
2017	National Television Awards	Entertainment Programme	Nominated
2018	National Television Awards	The Bruce Forsyth Entertainment Award	Nominated
