= Nii Odartei Evans =

British-Ghanaian actor, writer, filmmaker and voiceover artist

Russell Glynn Nii Odartei Evans (born 4 June 1980) is a British-Ghanaian actor, writer, filmmaker and voiceover artist best known for his work as a BBC announcer.

== Education ==
He attended the University of Bedfordshire and studied Software Engineering. He lived with and is best friends with Kiss FM DJ's Melvin Odoom and Rickie Haywood Williams.

== Career ==
Nii Odartei Evans first acted on stage in 2003 in an amateur production of a remake of George C Wolfe’s The Coloured Museum. The play “Black My Story” was adapted by his wife.

Nii joined the Identity Drama School in 2009 and then joined their agency which included actors such as John Boyega and Letitia Wright.

In 2005 Nii started his voiceover career at the BBC - initially voicing trails and idents for popular shows on BBC Radio 1Xtra. By 2008, he had become the station voiceover and was also featuring on BBC Radio 1 as well as other regional BBC Stations.

In 2014 Nii produced a pilot written by Yonah Odoom (sister to Melvin Odoom) and Moshana Khan. The pilot, entitled YOMO (You Only Marry Once) was loosely based on the ladies dating stories.

Nii's voice credit's are varied and include brands such as Channel 4 and Lebara mobile as well as voicing for animation.

After viewers contacted Points of View to complain about his London accent, Nii wrote a piece in the Guardian entitled "Those who ridiculed my accent highlighted their ignorance – not mine".

== Personal life ==
Evans was born to Ghanaian parents, and is active in the Ghanaian community. In 2006 he founded the Ghana Black Stars Network which was aimed at empowering young Ghanaians in the diaspora to reconnect with Ghana.

Evans is married to a woman with whom he co-founded “Love YaaYaa” - a business which sells handmade Leather Obi Belts, Accessories and Head Wraps. They live in East London and have two boys together.
