= Daisy London =

British jewellery brand

Daisy London is a British jewellery brand founded in 2009. It has an e-commerce platform and distributor in UK and internationally.

== History ==
Jewellery brand, Daisy London, was founded In 2009 by Ruth Bewsey. Its first advertising campaign featured Cara Delevingne. In 2012, Daisy London became part of the IBB Group of companies.

Daisy London has a network of distributors in the India United Kingdom and Europe and global distributors in America, Asia and South Africa.

== Notable designs ==
Daisy London designs "Chakra bracelets" which have been worn by celebrities such as Sienna Miller, Cara Delevingne, and Kanye West. The collection also includes necklaces, rings, earrings and diamond bracelets. Other collections include Good Karma, Halo and Alpha.

== Charity Partnerships ==
In August 2014, Daisy London worked with Princess Beatrice and Royal National Orthopedic Hospital (RNOH) on creating a charity bracelet to raise awareness for the RNOH where the Princess is a patron.

Other charity actions include donations to the Tumaini Trust and Dress For Success, to benefit the women's charity headed by Mary Portas.

== Collaboration with Laura Whitmore ==
Daisy London collaborated with presenter Laura Whitmore on a collection in October 2015. In June 2016, new summer festival pieces were added to the main Laura Whitmore x Daisy collection.
