= Survival of the Fittest (TV series) =

British reality TV series

- Genre: Reality television
- Created by: ITV
- Presented by: Laura Whitmore
- Narrated by: Brennan Reece
- Country of origin: United Kingdom
- Original language: English
- No. of series: 1
- No. of episodes: 20

Production
- Executive producer: Richard Cowles
- Producer: Sue Dunford
- Production location: South Africa
- Editor: Paul Newton
- Running time: 60–90 minutes (inc. adverts)
- Production companies: ITV Studios and Motion Content Group

Original release
- Network: ITV2
- Release: 11 February – 2 March 2018

Survival of the Fittest is a British reality TV series that premiered on ITV2 on 11 February 2018. The programme comes from the same production company that is behind Love Island.

The series pits the girls and boys against each-other as a "Battle of the Sexes". They compete in various mental and physical challenges. The show is presented by Laura Whitmore, and is narrated by Brennan Reece.

The series is filmed in South Africa with contestants living in a luxurious lodge. The series finished on 2 March 2018 with the girls being crowned the winners of Survival Of The Fittest. Mettisse was voted the fittest girl of the girls team and chose to split her £40,000 cash prize with her team, so each girl received £10,000.

Billed as a sister-show to Love Island; the series was cancelled after one season due to low ratings.

== Contestants ==
On 11 February 2018, 6 boys and 6 girls began competing in a battle of the sexes for a cash prize of £40,000.

The boys and girls compete against each other in a series of team challenges throughout the series. The winning team will automatically be safe from elimination while the losing team will face the public vote. The opposing team will then decide who is to be eliminated among those who are not saved by the public vote. When a contestant is eliminated, a new contestant will join the lodge as replacement.

After Shanice's arrival on Day 16, there will be no more replacements as the public votes for the "fittest boy" and "fittest girl", and only 4 girls and 4 boys will make the final.

=== Boys' team ===
Name	Age	Hometown	Entered	Status
David Lundy	26	Surrey	Day 1	Eliminated (Day 21)
James Middleton	24	Fulham	Day 1	Eliminated (Day 21)
Tristan Jones	20	Manchester	Day 1	Eliminated (Day 21)
Warren Phillips	30	Gloucester	Day 1	Eliminated (Day 21)
Callum Pardoe	21	Pontypool	Day 1	Eliminated (Day 19)
Tom Wilson	26	Nottingham	Day 12	Eliminated (Day 17)
Joel Bennett	28	Manchester	Day 8	Eliminated (Day 11)
Ryan Cleary	27	Manchester	Day 1	Eliminated (Day 7)

=== Girls' team ===
Name	Age	Hometown	Entered	Status
Jennifer West	31	Wigan	Day 1	Winners (Day 21)
Mariam Musa	23	Surrey	Day 1	Winners (Day 21)
Mettisse Campbell	21	Birmingham	Day 4	Winners (Day 21)
Sam Dewhurst	24	Manchester	Day 6	Winners (Day 21)
Hayley Madigan	28	Portsmouth	Day 14	Eliminated (Day 19)
Shanice Benstead	25	Surrey	Day 16	Eliminated (Day 17)
Georgia Cole	25	Bristol	Day 1	Eliminated (Day 15)
Sydney Devereaux	24	Essex	Day 9	Eliminated (Day 13)
Lottie James	22	Wales	Day 2	Eliminated (Day 9)
Georgie Clarke	25	London	Day 1	Eliminated (Day 5)
Tia Latham	28	Buckinghamshire	Day 1	Eliminated (Day 3)
Dani Dyer	21	East London	Day 1	Walked (Day 2)

=== Elimination chart ===
Girls' team
Boys' team

Team challenge
Contestant	1	2	3	4 (Note: There was no public vote after the team challenge. In a surprise twist, the winning boys' team was allowed to choose two girls to face elimination. The two chosen girls would compete head-to-head for survival, where only the winner will return to the lodge. The boys chose Georgia and Lottie. Lottie lost the challenge and was eliminated.)	5	6	7 (Note: There was no public vote after the team challenge. Every members in the losing girls' team would all need to compete in a survival challenge. Hayley was the best performing girl in the team challenge, so was immediately made safe. The winning boys' team was allowed to save another girl. They chose to save Mariam. Jenny and Mettisse won the first rounds of the challenge, leaving Sam and Georgia going head-to-head for survival. Georgia lost the challenge and was eliminated.)	8 (Note: All contestants faced the public vote regardless of winning or losing team challenge. Each team was given the chance to save two members of the opposing team from facing the public vote. The boys chose to save Mettisse and Mariam, whereas the girls decided to save Tristan and David. Tom and Shanice received the fewest votes and were eliminated immediately.)	9 (Note: All contestants faced the public vote. Each team was given the chance to save two members of their own team from facing the public vote, meaning they will be guaranteed a place in the final. The girls chose to save Jenny and Mettisse, whereas the boys decided to save Tristan and Warren.)	10
Jenny	SAFE	SAFE	WIN	SAFE	WIN	SAFE	BTM	SAFE	IMM	WON
Mariam	BTM	BTM	WIN	SAFE	WIN	BTM	SAFE	IMM	SAFE	WON
Mettisse	Not in lodge	BTM	WIN	SAFE	WIN	BTM	BTM	IMM	IMM	WON
Sam	Not in lodge		WIN	SAFE	WIN	BTM	BTM	BTM	BTM	WON
David	WIN	WIN	BTM	WIN	BTM	WIN	WIN	IMM	BTM	LOSE
James	WIN	WIN	BTM	WIN	BTM	WIN	WIN	SAFE	SAFE	LOSE
Tristan	WIN	WIN	SAFE	WIN	BTM	WIN	WIN	IMM	IMM	LOSE
Warren	WIN	WIN	SAFE	WIN	SAFE	WIN	WIN	SAFE	IMM	LOSE
Callum	WIN	WIN	SAFE	WIN	SAFE	WIN	WIN	BTM	ELIM	
Hayley	Not in lodge						SAFE	SAFE	ELIM	
Shanice	Not in lodge							ELIM		
Tom	Not in lodge					WIN	WIN	ELIM		
Georgia	BTM	SAFE	WIN	BTM	WIN	SAFE	ELIM			
Sydney	Not in lodge				WIN	ELIM				
Joel	Not in lodge			WIN	ELIM					
Lottie	Not in lodge	BTM	WIN	ELIM						
Ryan	WIN	WIN	ELIM							
Georgie	SAFE	ELIM								
Tia	ELIM									
Dani	LEFT (Note: Dani left the lodge after sustaining an injury during the first team challenge. She was replaced by Lottie.)									

Keywords

- WIN = The contestant won the team challenge and was immune from elimination.
- SAFE = The contestant lost the team challenge but was saved by public vote.
- BTM = The contestant lost the team challenge and was in the bottom of the public vote.
- ELIM = The contestant was eliminated.
- LEFT = The contestant left the lodge.

Colour key
The contestant won the team challenge and was immune from elimination.
The contestant lost the team challenge but was saved by public vote.
The contestant was immune from the public vote.
The contestant lost the team challenge and was in the bottom of the public vote.
The contestant was eliminated.
The contestant left the lodge.
The contestant does not feature in this team challenge.

== Ratings ==
Official ratings taken from the Broadcasters' Audience Research Board. These mostly include ITV2 and ITV2+1. Viewing figures shown are in millions.

Day	28–day data		
Day	Week 1	Week 2	Week 3
Sunday	1.08	—N/a	0.59
Monday	0.69	0.62	0.51
Tuesday	—N/a	0.58	0.48
Wednesday	0.67	0.44	0.59
Thursday	0.66	0.58	0.68
Friday	0.56	0.54	0.80
Saturday	0.66	0.53	-
