= Rickie Haywood-Williams =

British television presenter and DJ

- Born: 3 June 1980 (age 46); Croydon, Greater London
- Occupations: Radio DJ and television presenter
- Agent: Somethin' Else Talent
- Television: Sweat the Small Stuff (2013); Bang on the Money (2016)

Richard Haywood-Williams (born 3 June 1980) is a British radio DJ and television presenter best known for his work with Melvin Odoom and Charlie Hedges on Kiss FM, later BBC Radio 1 and the 2016 TV series Bang on the Money on ITV.

== Early life ==
Haywood-Williams attended the Riddlesdown High School in Croydon. At 16 he attended the BRIT School, gaining an A level in Media and a BTEC in broadcast journalism. He studied at the University of Bedfordshire, learning broadcasting at Luton FM. It was in Luton where he met Melvin Odoom and also actor and BBC Announcer Nii Odartei Evans.

== Career ==
The Kiss 100 Breakfast show signed up Haywood-Williams and Melvin Odoom as their new hosts in 2007; then later Charlie Hedges as their co-host in 2009. The show won Silver at the Sony Radio Academy Awards 2009 for Best Breakfast Show.

Haywood-Williams and Odoom presented the UKHot40 Big Beats Chart on Kiss TV and Box TV.

Haywood-Williams presented MTV News. He has presented news from the MTV Awards and some of London's biggest film premieres.

Alongside MTV News, Haywood-Williams and Odoom presented MTV Digs on MTV One, Monday to Saturday between 1600 and 1900. Haywood-Williams and Odoom hosted MTV's music show, MTV Music Junkie which was recorded within a live studio audience, interviewing music stars, including Robbie Williams and Shakira. Together they have also hosted a week-long special on Big Brother's Big Mouth for Channel 4.

In 2010, Haywood-Williams and Odoom also presented the backstage online footage for the Sky1 series Must Be The Music.

Haywood-Williams filmed a BBC Three documentary, My Weapon is My Dog, in 2009. The documentary explored in depth the hip-hop and peer-pressure culture that has led to a growth in aggressive dogs and examining why many young men want to be feared. He later presented BBC Three's Cannabis: Britain's Secret Farms, where he accompanied Avon and Somerset Police on raids.

In 2013, Haywood-Williams and Odoom were team captains on the BBC Three panel show Sweat the Small Stuff. However, he did not return to the show for the second series. In 2014, Haywood-Williams and Odoom presented an episode of The Hot Desk featuring Mark Ronson. In 2016, Haywood-Williams and Odoom co-hosted Saturday night game show Bang on the Money for ITV. He took part in ITV's celebrity football match Soccer Aid in June 2016, playing for 'The Rest of the World' team due to his Sierra Leonean ancestry.

Haywood-Williams and Odoom presented the 2016 MOBO Awards in Glasgow.

From April 2019, Haywood-Williams, Odoom and Charlie Hedges moved to BBC Radio 1 to present late nights every Monday to Thursday from 9 to 11 pm. From September 2020 the show was moved to an earlier 8 to 10 pm slot due to changes in BBC Radio 1 evening schedule.

In April 2021 it was announced that the trio would be the new hosts of the 10:30-12:45 Live Lounge show. Their new show started in September 2021.

On 15 July 2026, the BBC announced that both Haywood-Williams and Odoom would leave Radio 1 after seven years.

He has since guest presented the Transfer Insiders show on Talksport radio.

Haywood-Williams danced with Luba Mushtuk for the 2022 Strictly Come Dancing Christmas Special.

== Filmography ==
Television

Year	Title	Role	Notes
2008	Hollyoaks	Himself	
2010	Must Be the Music	Backstage co-presenter	Alongside Melvin Odoom
2009	My Weapon is My Dog	Presenter	BBC Three documentary
2013	Sweat the Small Stuff	Team captain	
2014	The Hot Desk: Mark Ronson	Co-presenter	Alongside Melvin Odoom
2015–2016	The BRITs Backstage	Co-presenter	Alongside Laura Whitmore and Melvin Odoom
2016	Bang on the Money	Co-presenter	Alongside Melvin Odoom
2022	Strictly Come Dancing Christmas Special	Himself	
