= Pop & Suki =

Fashion brand

- Industry: Fashion
- Founders: Poppy Jamie, Suki Waterhouse, Leo Seigal
- Website: popandsuki.com

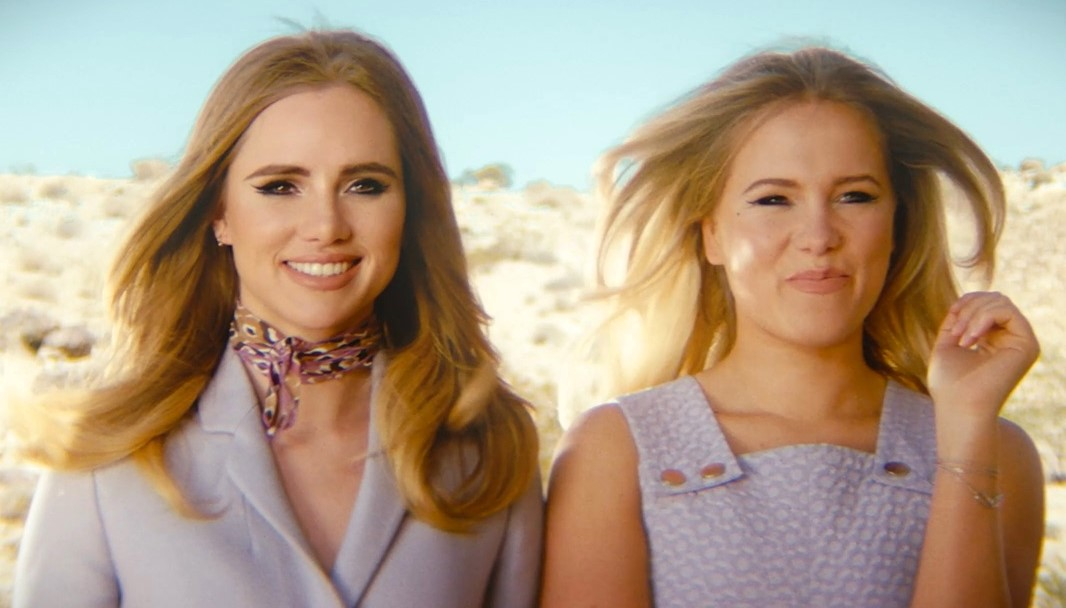
LtoR: Waterhouse and Jamie for the launch of Pop & Suki in 2016

Pop & Suki is a fashion accessories brand by friends Suki Waterhouse and Poppy Jamie. The direct-to-consumer brand focuses on personalization and uses playful, minimal, girly designs and a signature "millennial pink" color. Its main item is the camera bag, a handbag modeled on the fanny pack. The brand launched online in November 2016 and has since hosted a pop-up shop and multiple collections. It is particularly popular among celebrities and on Instagram, in part based on Waterhouse's influence.

== Brand ==
Pop & Suki is a direct-to-consumer, millennial fashion accessories brand. Its focus on personalization—including monograms, changeable straps, and add-on charms—is meant to evoke girl power and the love of close friendship. Its designs are meant to be "fun, playful, [and] versatile", with minimal, pastel, girly accessories at accessible prices. The brand's signature color is a light "millennial pink".

Their bags are inspired by vintage and Pinterest collections. Their main item is the camera bag, a five-in-one handbag modeled on the fanny pack.

Pop & Suki treats Instagram as its storefront, before its own website. While their sales conversion data is murky, they believe their social media work drives significant traffic to their website. As of 2018, the company used little digital advertising and pays influencers in gifts.

== History ==
Model–actress Suki Waterhouse and her best friend, Poppy Jamie, started the fashion accessories brand Pop & Suki as newcomers to Los Angeles. The brand's signature pink is based on the Emilia Wickstead outfit Waterhouse wore when she first met Jamie in Los Angeles. Their friend Leo Seigal was brought in as co-founder and CEO. Waterhouse described her and Jamie as being scattered before Seigal's vision tied their ideas together. Pop & Suki launched online in November 2016.

The brand hosted its first physical retail as a pop-up shop in Culver City's The Platform in March and April 2017. In addition to their spring collection, the pop-up shop included sardine tin candles, nail polish, and iPhone cases. The shop was designed by British architect Samuel Douek to be minimal, industrial, pink, and versatile enough to travel to New York and London later that year.

Pop & Suki found immediate popularity among celebrities. Its launch, hosted at Mel's Diner in Los Angeles, attracted what Prestige Hong Kong described as "today's fashion/social media royalty": Cara Delevingne, Paris Hilton, and Georgia May Jagger. Even prior, stars including Jessica Alba, Lena Dunham, and Lady Gaga were seen with Pop & Suki handbags. The brand was helped by Waterhouse's own outsized celebrity, friend network, and Instagram influence, having modeled for major fashion houses, major fashion magazines, and acted in multiple Hollywood films. They also credited the 2017 women's movement with inspiration and business momentum. Pop & Suki officially launched at the November 2018 Shanghai Fashion Week. Celebrities with Pop & Suki accessories have since included Beyoncé and Pippa Middleton.

They launched their second collection (Spring 2017) with a soiree at Sunset Tower and a short film collaboration with Kodak. Pop & Suki, in reference to their classic camera bag, designed a limited edition case for Kodak's Ektra smartphone in the brand's signature millennial pink.

In a March 2017 collaboration with the luggage company Away, Pop & Suki released a millennial pink version of the company's standard suitcases. The bags were popular on Instagram and sold out quickly. They were restocked later that year.

== Business ==
Pop & Suki reported $2.5 million in revenue in 2017 and expected to reach profitability in the last quarter of 2018. The company also planned an expansion into Hong Kong and wholesale accounts.
