= Bang on the Money =

2016 British game show

- Genre: Game show
- Presented by: Rickie Haywood Williams; Melvin Odoom
- Country of origin: United Kingdom
- No. of series: 1
- No. of episodes: 9

Production
- Running time: 60 minutes (inc.adverts)
- Production company: Thames

Original release
- Network: ITV
- Release: 16 April – 11 June 2016

Bang on the Money is a British game show that aired on ITV and was hosted by Rickie Haywood Williams and Melvin Odoom.

== Format ==
Two three-member teams compete in each episode for a chance to win up to £40,000. The main game consists of four rounds.

=== Rounds 1, 2 and 3 ===
In each round, the hosts describe a pre-recorded challenge they have undertaken, and both teams predict who won it. The winner of a backstage coin toss chooses first in rounds 1 and 3, and the loser in round 2. Footage of the challenge is then played, and the team with the correct guess chooses two boxes from a group of nine. Each box contains a different number from 1 to 9 and shows a different random picture, such as a tartan pattern, a teapot, or a pair of high-heeled shoes.

The numbers in the two chosen boxes are revealed, those boxes are removed from play, and a challenge is then described to both teams. The team that won the prediction chooses one of the two numbers as their target, while the other number is given to their opponents. Both teams then play the challenge separately, the team with the lower target number playing first. If a team succeeds, they carry their number through the rest of the game; if they fail, they are given a zero for the round. Higher numbers increase the difficulty of a challenge, but also add more money to the team's prize pot if they succeed.

The Round 1 challenge is for a single player, who then sits out in Round 2 as his/her teammates play together. In Round 3, all three team members participate.

=== Round 4: The Decider ===
Each team's initial prize pot is set by arranging their three numbers in descending order (e.g. "7-4-8" would become £874). The remaining boxes are taken out of play at this point. A challenge is described, and each team secretly selects a target number from 1 to 9. Both teams then play the challenge, with each team member having one turn. Teams alternate turns, starting with the team whose target number is lower; if they are the same, the team with the lower prize pot goes first. If any one player succeeds, the team completes the challenge and their target number is multiplied by £1,000 and added to their pot. (In the previous example, if the team chose 9 as their target and completed the challenge, their pot would become £9,874.) The team with the higher prize pot after this round advances to the final, while their opponents leave with nothing.

=== Final: Circle of Cash ===
One player at a time stands at the centre of the Circle of Cash, a large circle of lights traced out on the stage floor. The money is placed on the Circle and begins to orbit the player. Three spots are marked as tunnels, which can randomly allow the money to pass through or reverse its direction; these tunnels are located directly behind the player and to his/her left and right. A buzzer known as the Bang Button is on a pedestal before the player. When pressed, it sends a beam of light directly ahead of the player, out to the edge of the circle. He/she has one chance to press the Bang Button and hit the money with the beam as it passes.

The first hit awards the money in the prize pot to the team, and each subsequent hit doubles the total. The movement speed of the money also increases after each hit. After all three players have had their turn, they split the final winnings equally.

The maximum potential prize for a single episode is £39,948, obtained by getting 9-8-7 as the target numbers in the first three rounds, winning the Decider with a target of 9, and hitting the money three times in the Circle of Cash.

== Challenges ==
=== Round 1 (1 player) ===
- Go Slow: The player must walk a balance beam from one end to the other while staying within a zone of green lights that slowly advances across the floor. Higher target numbers reduce the beam width. Falling off the beam or moving outside the zone requires the player to restart. (90 seconds)
- Lights Off: The player stands before a semicircle of light-up posts, each with a button mounted on its top end. Enough lights are initially on to match the target number, and others turn on at random. The player turns lights off by pressing their buttons, and must leave as many on as there were lit at the start. (60 seconds)
- Putt It: Standing behind a line, the player must putt golf balls into a row of oversized holes. The number of holes is equal to the target number, and the rows for higher numbers are closer to the line. The player must get at least one ball into every hole to win. (90 seconds)

=== Round 2 (2 players) ===
- Coin It In: The players stand on opposite sides of a long table divided into zones. Each zone contains a cup and several coins. The players must pick up the coins with one hand each and place them in the cup, and must clear a zone before moving on to the next one. The number of zones in play is equal to the target number; all must be cleared to win. (10 seconds, multiplied by the target number)
- In the Loop: The players must manoeuvre a large metal ring along five towers from top to bottom, using wires attached to the outer edge. Higher target numbers reduce the inner diameter of the ring. If the ring touches a tower, the players must restart that one from the top. (60 seconds)
- Magnet Track: The players stand on opposite sides of a vertical wall that contains a path outlined in red. One player moves a magnetic disc along the path and must guide it from one end to the other while avoiding the edges. The wall has two sections in which the player moving the disc cannot see the path, but his/her partner can see it and must call out directions to guide the disc through. The size of the disc increases with the target number, and 1 second is lost every time it touches either edge of the path. (90 seconds)
- Mind Map: The players are shown a path in which every segment is a different colour and length. They are given a short time to memorise the path, then must build it on the stage floor by connecting a set of pre-arranged posts with coloured bars. The time given to memorise the path decreases for higher target numbers. (90 seconds)

=== Round 3 (3 players) ===
- Age Gap: The team is shown a blank grid with pictures of five celebrities along its top edge, and a second grid of 25 two-digit numbers. One player must place a number beneath a picture to match that celebrity's age as the other two call out advice, then press a buzzer to find out if the guess is correct. The team may play the celebrities in any order, and must get all five ages correct to win. Higher target numbers place the buzzer farther from the two grids. (90 seconds)
- Escape the Tower: A rack of triangular plaques is set on the floor within a slowly rotating tower. Using tweezers, the players must pick up a plaque and pass it from one to another until they can remove it from the top of the tower. The players may only reach in through three sets of coloured holes, one colour per player. If they drop the plaque, they must get a new one from the rack and restart. Higher target numbers reduce the size of the plaques. (60 seconds)
- Turntable: The players stand around the edges of a slowly rotating turntable with one hole in its surface. Each player has a swivel-mounted ramp to use in rolling balls onto the table, attempting to get them into the hole. Higher target numbers reduce the size of the hole. To win, the team must get 10 balls in. (90 seconds)
- Untangle: Three coloured ropes are used, with one end tied to a post and each free end attached to a belt worn by a different player. The ropes have been formed into a number of tangles equal to the target number. The players must undo all of the tangles and each press a buzzer corresponding to their rope. (90 seconds)

=== Decider ===
- Catch It If You Can: The player stands facing away from a ball held in a clamp at a certain height above the floor. Higher target numbers reduce this height. The player must press a button with both hands to release the ball, then turn around and catch it before it hits the floor.
- Clear Run: A dumbbell-like roller rests at the top of a ramp on one end of a long, straight track. Several pegs are inserted into the other end: six white ones, followed by a number of orange ones equal to the target number. The player must press a button next to the ramp to start the roller, then run to the pegs and pull them all out with one hand so that the roller reaches the far end without touching any of them.
- Roll with It: The player must roll a ball from one end of a track to the other, without allowing it to fall into any of several holes that open and close in a set pattern. The number of holes that are open at any moment is equal to the target number.
- Swing Low: The player must jump up from the floor and completely clear the horizontal bar of a giant trapeze as it swings down toward him/her. Higher target numbers increase the required jump height. The bar is padded and designed to break away from its supports without injuring the player if the jump is unsuccessful.
