= Melvin Odoom =

British radio DJ and television presenter

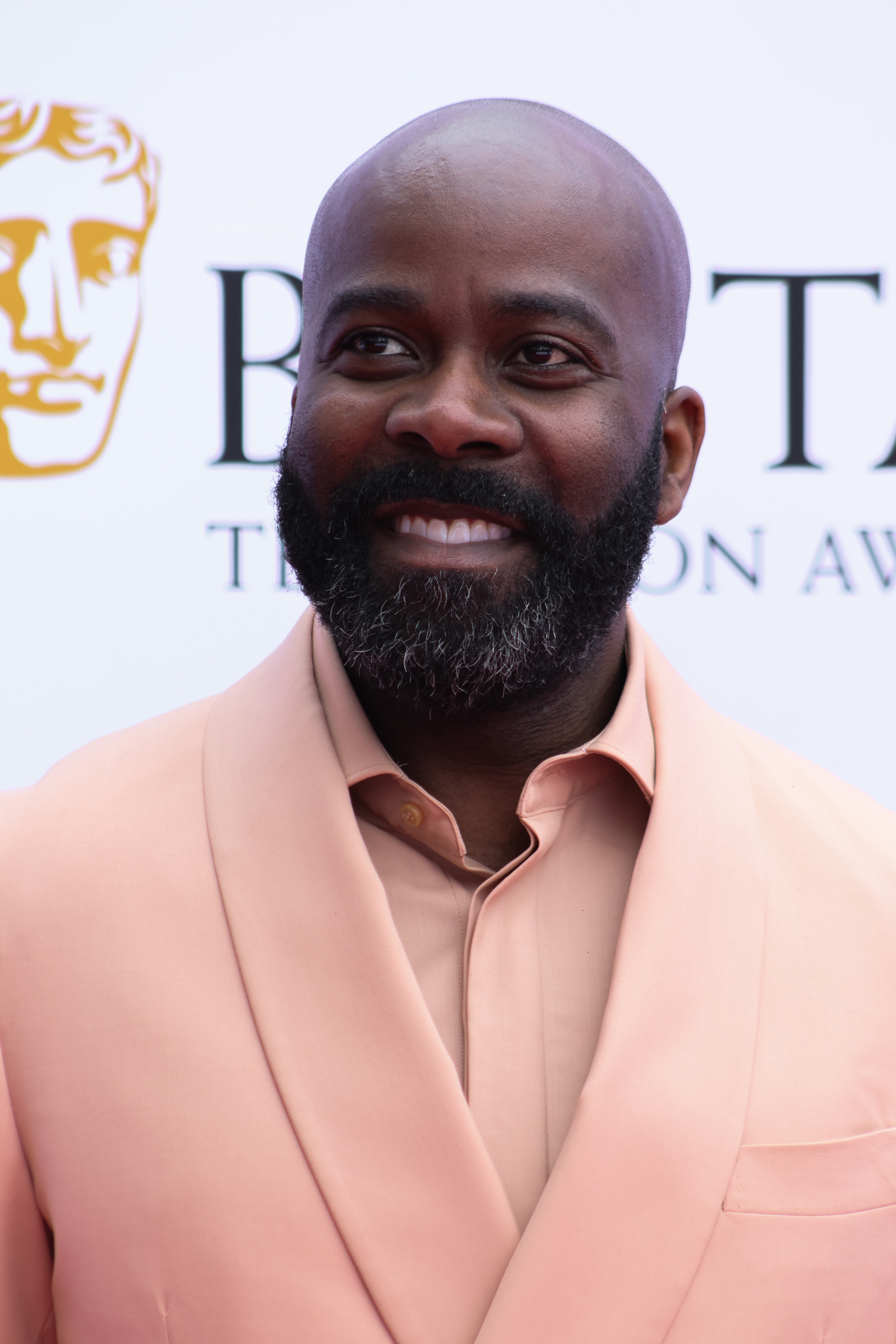
- Odoom in 2026
- Born: Melvin Kuuku Odoom; 30 July 1980 (age 46); Hammersmith, London, England
- Occupations: DJ; television and radio presenter
- Agent: Encanta Talent
- Television: Dick & Dom in da Bungalow (2002–06); The Slammer (2006–2015); Sweat the Small Stuff (2013–15); The Xtra Factor (2015); Strictly Come Dancing (2016); I'm a Celebrity...Get Me Out of Here! (2024)

Melvin Kuuku Odoom (born 30 July 1980) is a British radio DJ and television presenter. Alongside Rickie Haywood-Williams and Charlie Hedges, he presented the Kiss FM breakfast show (2009–2018) and on BBC Radio 1 (2019–2026). In television, he has been involved in presenting Dick & Dom in da Bungalow (2002–2006), Basil's Swap Shop (2008), the BRIT Awards 2010 and Must Be the Music (2010), The Xtra Factor (2015), Bang on the Money (2016), and MOBO Awards 2016, as well as being a regular guest celebrity on many television shows. He was also a contestant on Strictly Come Dancing in 2016 and I'm a Celebrity...Get Me Out of Here! in 2024.

== Education ==
Melvin Kuuku Odoom was born on 30 July 1980 in Cricklewood, London. He attended the University of Bedfordshire and studied a Media Performance and Radio degree. It was at Luton that Odoom met and lived with Rickie Haywood-Williams.

== Career ==
=== Radio ===
Odoom, alongside Rickie Haywood-Williams and Charlie Hedges, hosted Kiss Breakfast every weekday morning 6 - 9 am, followed by Kiss Morning Anthems until 10 am on Kiss 100. Kiss Breakfast won Silver at the Sony Radio Awards in 2009 within the category of "Breakfast Show Award", and was nominated for the same prize in 2010, finally winning 'Gold' at the event in 2012. Odoom was part of the Kiss Breakfast team for 10 years, stepping down in 2018.

In April 2019, the trio moved to BBC Radio 1 to present the late night show Monday to Thursday from 9 to 11 pm, also occasionally covering daytime shows. In April 2021, It was announced by Radio 1 that Clara Amfo would be moving to evenings on the station to replace Annie Mac. As part of this reshuffle Odoom, Haywood-Williams and Hedges took on the 10:30–12:45 show including the live lounge. On 15 July 2026, the BBC announced that both Odoom and Haywood-Williams would leave Radio 1 after seven years.

Since 2025, Odoom has provided holiday and relief cover on BBC Radio 2 for DJ Spoony on The Good Groove.

=== Television ===
Odoom and Rickie Haywood-Williams have presented MTV Digs on MTV One, Monday to Saturday between 4 and 7 pm and MTV Music Junkie together — a live studio music show. Odoom presented MTV One's coverage of the BRIT Awards 2010 alongside Haywood-Williams, and also presented coverage of the BAFTA awards alongside Kimberly Walsh for MTV One.

In 2010, Odoom and Haywood-Williams also presented the backstage online content for Sky1's Must Be the Music.

Odoom hosted an MTV Leona Lewis special and presented BBC Blast for BBC Two. Odoom was presenting Basil's Swap Shop with Basil Brush in 2008 on Saturday mornings, alongside his days of playing various characters for the long-running show Dick and Dom in Da Bungalow.

From 2013 until 2015, Odoom was a team captain on the BBC Three comedy panel show Sweat the Small Stuff. In 2014, Odoom and Haywood-Williams presented an episode of The Hot Desk featuring Mark Ronson. Since 2015, Odoom and Haywood-Williams co-hosted ITV2's red carpet show at the BRIT Awards alongside Laura Whitmore.

On 18 June 2015, Odoom and Rochelle Humes were confirmed as the new presenters of The Xtra Factor, replacing Sarah-Jane Crawford.

Odoom and Haywood-Williams co-presented the Saturday night entertainment series Bang on the Money, which began in April 2016 on ITV.

On 12 August 2016, it was announced that Odoom would take part in the fourteenth series of Strictly Come Dancing, and was partnered with Janette Manrara. The couple were the first to leave the competition having had the fewest public votes. However, Odoom and Manrara went on to win the Strictly Come Dancing Christmas special.

In February 2017, Odoom took part in a celebrity edition of Take Me Out.

In 2017, Odoom and Haywood-Williams took part in Let's Sing and Dance for Comic Relief.

Since 2017, Odoom has hosted the Channel 4 programme Lego Masters, where teams battle to build the best Lego creations.

In 2020, Odoom took part in Richard Osman's House of Games and became the show's first contestant to score a minus point.

In November 2024, Odoom appeared as a contestant on the twenty-fourth series of I'm a Celebrity...Get Me Out of Here! in which he became the fourth campmate to be eliminated from the series, finishing in ninth place.

== Personal life ==
He is a celebrity ambassador for The King's Trust charity, which is involved in helping young adults in life. He is also the brother of actress and writer Yonah Odoom.

Odoom is not a big follower of football and supports Tottenham Hotspur F.C. and the Ghana national football team.

== Filmography ==
Television

Year	Title	Role	Channel	Notes
2002–2006	Dick & Dom in da Bungalow	Himself	CBBC	226 episodes
2006–2008	The Slammer	Melvin	CBBC	Supporting cast; 28 episodes
2007	Gina's Laughing Gear	Policeman	CBBC	1 episode
2008	SMart	Guest presenter	CBBC	1 episode
2008	Basil's Swap Shop	Himself	CBBC	13 episodes
2008	4Music Intros	Presenter	4Music	6 episodes
2009	Da Dick and Dom Dairies	Himself	CBBC	20 episodes
2009	The Legend of Dick and Dom	Moonbeam	CBBC	1 episode
2010	Must Be the Music	Online presenter	Sky 1	
2012	Diddy Movies	Diddy Brad	CBBC	1 episode, 'Hollywood High'
2013–2015	Sweat the Small Stuff	Team captain	BBC Three	
2014	The Hot Desk: Mark Ronson	Co-presenter	ITV2	Alongside Rickie Haywood Williams
2015–2016	The BRITs Backstage	Co-presenter	ITV2	Alongside Laura Whitmore and Rickie Haywood Williams
2015	Celebrity Squares	Himself	ITV	1 episode
2015	The Xtra Factor	Co-presenter	ITV2	Alongside Rochelle Humes
2016	Bang on the Money	Co-presenter	ITV	Alongside Rickie Haywood Williams
2016	Up Late with Rylan	Guest	Channel 5	
2016	Strictly Come Dancing	Participant	BBC One	Partnered with Janette Manrara
2016	CBBC Official Chart Show	Guest	CBBC	1 episode
2016	MOBO Awards 2016	Co-host	ITV2	Alongside Rickie Haywood Williams
2016	Strictly Come Dancing Christmas Special	Participant/Winner	BBC One	Partnered with Janette Manrara
2016	New Year's Eve Fireworks	Presenter	BBC One	
2017	Take Me Out: Celebrity Special	Himself	ITV	
2017	Let's Sing and Dance for Comic Relief	Participant	BBC One	Alongside Rickie Haywood Williams
2017	Marrying Mum and Dad	Guest	CBBC	
2017	Lego Masters	Presenter	Channel 4	
2017	Would I Lie to You	Panellist	BBC1	David Mitchell’s team
2017	My Hotter Half	Presenter	E4	
2018	Japandemonium	Narrator	ITV	
2020	Celebrity Karaoke Club	Contestant	ITV2	
2020	Richard Osman's House of Games	Contestant	BBC2	
2021	The Great British Bake Off: An Extra Slice	Guest	Channel 4	
2024	I'm a Celebrity...Get Me Out of Here!	Contestant	ITV1	series 24
2026	Celebrity MasterChef	Contestant	BBC One	Series 21

Film

Year	Title	Role	Notes
2009	My Last Five Girlfriends	Agent 2	
2013	Battle of the Year	Himself	
