= Sweat the Small Stuff =

British TV comedy panel show 2013–15

- Also known as: Sweat the Small Stuff: Extra Sweaty (extended)
- Genre: Comedy panel game
- Directed by: Andrew Chaplin (Series 1); Toby Baker (Series 1, 3-4); Ollie Bartlett (Series 1-4); Tom Forbes (Series 2-3)
- Presented by: Nick Grimshaw
- Starring: Melvin Odoom; Rickie Haywood Williams; Rochelle Humes
- Country of origin: United Kingdom
- Original language: English
- No. of series: 4
- No. of episodes: 31 (inc. 6 specials)

Production
- Executive producers: Sean Hancock (Series 1-2); Daniel Baldwin (Series 1-2); Leon Wilson (Series 1-4); Suzanne McManus (Series 3); James Longman (Series 3-4); Ed Sleeman (Series 4)
- Producers: Andrew Chaplin (Series 1); Sarah James (Series 1); Tom Forbes (Series 2-3); Ed Sleeman (Series 2); Isabel Forte (Series 3-4)
- Production location: Riverside Studios
- Editors: Chris Moore (Series 1); Stuart Lutes (Series 1); Steve Nayler (Series 2-4); Ben Hanley (Series 2-4)
- Running time: 30 minutes 45 minutes (extended)
- Production company: Talkback

Original release
- Network: BBC Three
- Release: 30 April 2013 – 7 January 2015

Sweat the Small Stuff is a British comedy panel show broadcast on BBC Three, presented by Nick Grimshaw and featuring team captains Melvin Odoom and Rochelle Humes. Humes, formerly a regular panellist, replaced Rickie Haywood Williams, who was a team captain in series 2.

On 14 March 2014, it was announced that the show had been recommissioned for a third and fourth series.

The show ended in December 2014.

== Rounds ==
Grimmy's Sweats: (Series 1): Grimshaw gives the teams clues to a particular "sweat" or topic that has been affecting him that week, and the first team to guess what the sweat is wins a point for their team.

On the Quiff of Grimmy (Series 1–3): Grimshaw gets the great British public to swear 'on the quiff of Grimshaw', a wig of Grimshaw's hair, to give an honest answer to a question they are asked. The teams have to guess whether the person said yes or no.

The Challenges (Series 1–4): In this round, Rochelle competes against Melvin in a street challenge given to them by Grimshaw, which involves a number of tasks. The person who completes the most tasks is the winner. Rickie participated in this round in series one.

The Sweatbox (Series 1–4): In this round, a member of the studio audience goes into the 'Sweatbox', a small wooden hut in the studio, and tells the teams about their dilemma. The teams will give them their advice and the person must choose whose advice is better.

Grimmy Examinates (Series 2–3): Grimshaw investigates a particular "sweat" or topic provided by a listener of his BBC Radio 1 Breakfast Show. Grimshaw then invites the team to take part in a studio game relating to that sweat.

Quick Fire Sweats (Series 3): The teams pitch a sweat to the studio audience against the clock, in an attempt to prove to the majority of the audience that the sweat is truly annoying. If the sweat is annoying, the team wins a point.

Sweaty Headlines (series 4): The teams are shown pictures of three celebrities who have featured in the week's news, and have to guess which celebrity the studio audience believes has had the 'sweatiest' (worst) week of them all. A point is awarded to the winner.

Sweat Selector (Series 4): In this round, a number is generated from 1-99, and a sweat relating to that number is then revealed. The team captains or panelists then have to compete in a studio game or quiz related to that number to earn points for their team.

== Transmissions ==
=== Series ===
Series	Start date	End date	Episodes
1	30 April 2013	18 June 2013	8
2	15 October 2013	3 December 2013	8
3	8 April 2014	27 May 2014	8
4	29 October 2014	10 December 2014	7

=== Specials ===
Date	Entitle
25 June 2013	The Best of Series 1 (Part 1)
2 July 2013	The Best of Series 1 (Part 2)
10 December 2013	The Best of Series 2
2 June 2014	The Best of Series 3
17 December 2014	Christmas Special
7 January 2015	The Best of Series 4

== Episodes ==
The coloured backgrounds denote the result of each of the shows:

– indicates Rickie/Rochelle's team won
– indicates Melvin's team won
– indicates the game ended in a draw

=== Series 1 (2013) ===
Episode	Original broadcast (extended version)	Rickie's team	Melvin's team (Note: Humes went on maternity leave midway through the series and was replaced by her The Saturdays bandmates.)
1x01	30 April 2013; 5 May 2013	Joe Lycett; Holly Willoughby	Rochelle Humes; Ricky Norwood
1x02	7 May 2013; 12 May 2013	Caroline Flack; Seann Walsh	Rochelle Humes; Wretch 32
1x03	14 May 2013; 19 May 2013	Joel Dommett; Jaime Winstone	Rochelle Humes; Rylan Clark
1x04	21 May 2013; 26 May 2013	Russell Kane; Kimberley Walsh	Rochelle Humes; Aston Merrygold
1x05	28 May 2013; 2 June 2013	Tulisa Contostavlos; Katherine Ryan	Rochelle Humes; Danny Dyer
1x06	4 June 2013; 7 June 2013	Chris Ramsey; Union J	Frankie Sandford; Jamie Laing
1x07	11 June 2013; 14 June 2013	Max George; Jay McGuiness; Matt Richardson	Mollie King; Vanessa White; Laura Whitmore
1x08	18 June 2013; 21 June 2013	James Acaster; Katy B	Una Healy; Rick Edwards
1x09	25 June 2013	Compilation episode – The Best of Series 1 (Part 1)	
1x10	2 July 2013	Compilation episode – The Best of Series 1 (Part 2)	

=== Series 2 (2013) ===
Episode	Original broadcast (extended version)	Rochelle's team	Melvin's team
2x01	15 October 2013; 20 October 2013	Conor Maynard; Seann Walsh	Jacqueline Jossa; Matt Richardson
2x02	22 October 2013; 27 October 2013	Joe Lycett; Danny Jones; Harry Judd	Eliza Doolittle; Carl Donnelly
2x03	29 October 2013	Spencer Matthews; Iain Stirling	Tom Davis; Sarah Harding
2x04	5 November 2013	James Arthur; Rob Beckett	Aisling Bea; Helen Flanagan
2x05	12 November 2013	Chris Ramsey; Rachel Riley	James Acaster; Kelly Osbourne
2x06 (Note: Featured an appearance by Christopher Maloney)	19 November 2013	Joel Dommett; Ana Matronic	Example; Bobby Mair
2x07	26 November 2013	Professor Green; Romesh Ranganathan	Georgia May Foote; Ian Smith
2x08	3 December 2013	Seann Walsh; Mark Wright	Little Mix; Jolyon Rubinstein
2x09	10 December 2013	Compilation episode – The Best of Series 2	

=== Series 3 (2014) ===
Episode	Original broadcast	Rochelle's team	Melvin's team
3x01	8 April 2014	Nev Wilshire; Ed Gamble	Katherine Ryan; Alexa Chung
3x02	15 April 2014	Tom Rosenthal; Khali Best	Gareth Malone; Roisin Conaty
3x03	22 April 2014	Brad Simpson; James McVey; Holly Walsh	Abbey Clancy; Lloyd Griffith
3x04	29 April 2014	Gemma Whelan; Scott Mills	Daisy Lowe; Seann Walsh
3x05	6 May 2014	Foxes; Bobby Mair	Yasmine Akram; Marvin Humes
3x06	13 May 2014	Example; Romesh Ranganathan	Elis James; Rita Ora
3x07	20 May 2014	Tyger Drew-Honey; Nick Helm	Fearne Cotton; Rhys James
3x08	27 May 2014	David Haye; David Morgan	Tamara Ecclestone; Joe Lycett
3x09	2 June 2014	Compilation episode – The Best of Series 3	

=== Series 4 (2014–15) ===
Episode	Original broadcast	Rochelle's team	Melvin's team
4x01	29 October 2014	Ivo Graham; Jack Osbourne	Ella Eyre; Alex Brooker
4x02	5 November 2014	Lacey Turner; Ellie Taylor	Alex James; Rhys James
4x03	12 November 2014	Dane Baptiste; Russell Kane	Kimberly Wyatt; Romesh Ranganathan
4x04	19 November 2014	Danny Wilkin; Jake Roche; Sam Simmons	Ed Gamble; Stacey Solomon
4x05	26 November 2014	Ashley Walters; James Acaster	Maisie Williams; Iain Stirling
4x06	3 December 2014	Tulisa Contostavlos; Seann Walsh	Professor Green; Tash Demetriou
4x07	10 December 2014	George Shelley; Jaymi Hensley; Nish Kumar	Christian Jessen; Katherine Ryan
4x08 (Note: Christmas special)	17 December 2014	Ricky Wilson; Bobby Mair	Pixie Lott; Chris Ramsey
4x09	7 January 2015	Compilation episode – The Best of Series 4	

== Scores ==
Rickie	Rochelle	Melvin
Series wins (1 drawn)
2		1
1	1	1
Episode wins (0 drawn)
17		15
5	12	15
