= Poppy Jamie =

British entrepreneur and television presenter

- Born: 19 July 1990 (age 35); London, England
- Education: London School of Economics
- Occupations: Entrepreneur, television presenter

Poppy Elizabeth Jamie (born 19 July 1990) is a British entrepreneur, author and media personality.

== Entrepreneurship ==
=== Pop & Suki ===
In September 2016, Jamie launched the accessories brand Pop & Suki, co-founded with Suki Waterhouse.

The brand’s launch collection, which included handbags and jewellery, received coverage in Vogue, Harper's Bazaar, W Magazine and Elle.

In 2018, Pop & Suki was included on the Forbes 30 Under 30 list in the Retail & Ecommerce category.

=== Happy Not Perfect ===
In 2017, Jamie launched Happy Not Perfect, a mental-health and wellbeing app focused on emotional resilience, cognitive tools and stress reduction.

In 2022, the platform was acquired by JumpStart Games Inc., the parent company behind Neopets, as reported by Glossy.

=== With Gratitude ===
In 2025, Jamie and Suki Waterhouse launched With Gratitude, a social-wellness app encouraging users to share daily gratitude entries within small social groups.

=== Cuddle Sleep Health ===
Jamie has also worked in the consumer-wellbeing space, including the development of Cuddle Sleep Health, a sleep-wellness brand focused on nighttime rituals and functional health products.

== Entertainment career ==
Since 2010, Jamie has anchored a variety of programmes including FYI Daily and The Hot Desk for ITV2, as well as the MTV Movie Awards on MTV International.

At the age of 19, Jamie became an entertainment correspondent at ITN.

In 2015, Jamie hosted Pillow Talk with Poppy, Snapchat’s first talk show, interviewing music artists, actors and models.

Jamie created and hosts the wellness podcast Unwind with Poppy Jamie, which explores mental health, neuroscience and emotional wellbeing.

In September 2016, she was announced as a speaker at TEDxHollywood, where she presented on emotional wellbeing and digital culture.

== Writing and publications ==
Jamie is the author of Happy Not Perfect, published by Hachette in 2021.The book incorporates psychology, neuroscience and personal narrative to explore emotional resilience and stress.

== Awards and recognition ==
Jamie received a Points of Light Award from the UK Prime Minister’s Office in recognition of her contribution to mental-health advocacy through Happy Not Perfect.
