= Laura Whitmore =

Irish presenter and actress (born 1985)

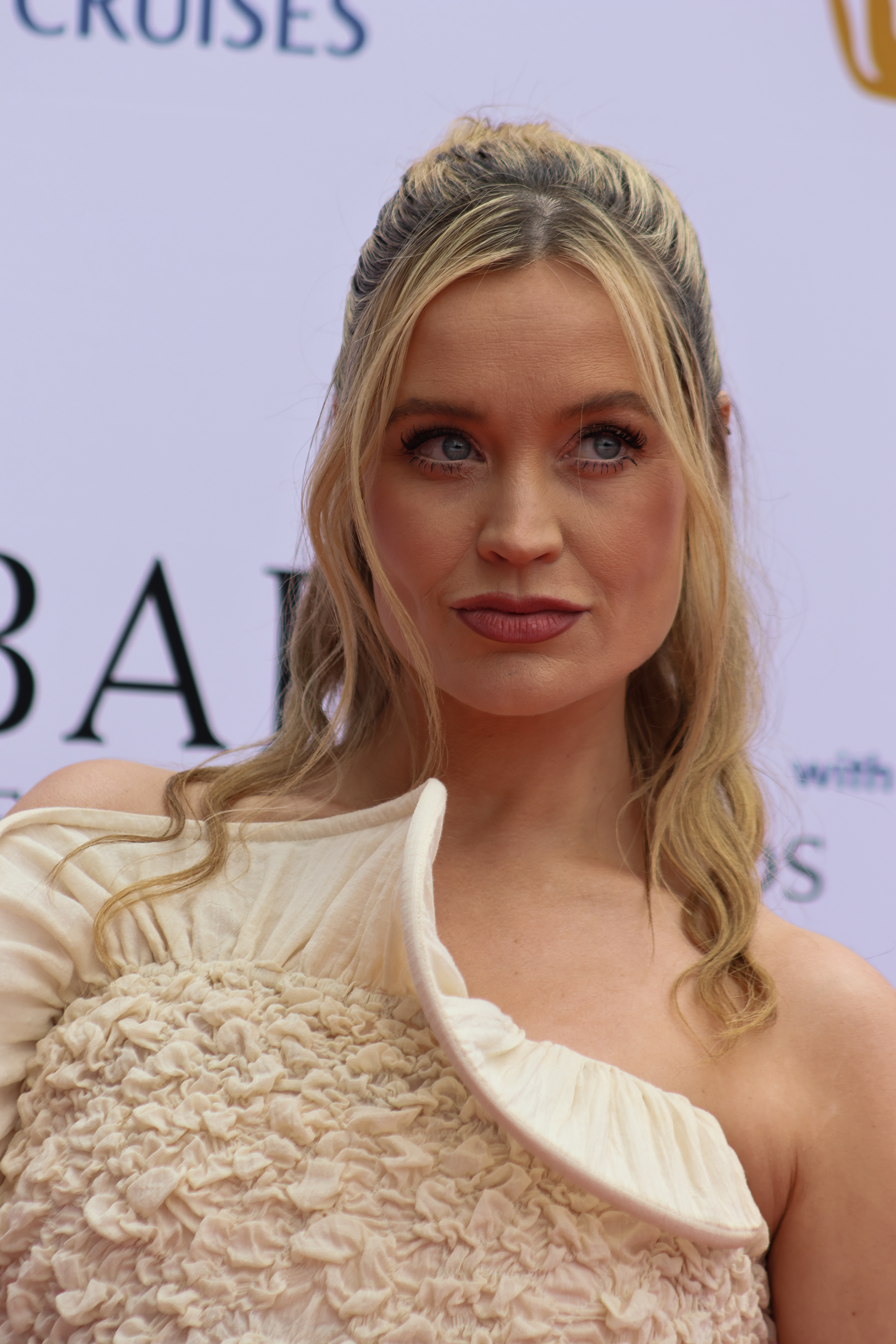
- Whitmore in 2026
- Born: 4 May 1985 (age 41); Dublin, Ireland
- Occupations: Media personality; model; actress
- Years active: 2008–present
- Spouse: Iain Stirling (m. 2020)
- Children: 2
- Website: laurawhitmore.com

Laura Whitmore (born 4 May 1985) is an Irish media personality, model, and actress based in London. She was a video jockey for MTV in 2008, and has since presented television shows, such as This Morning (2014), Survival of the Fittest (2018), and Love Island (2020–2022). In 2020, Whitmore became a team captain on the comedy panel show Celebrity Juice. In 2023, Whitmore hosted her first ITV1 chat show Laura Whitmore's Breakfast Show and released her own one-off ITVX documentary series Laura Whitmore Investigates.

== Early life ==
Whitmore was born in Dublin on 4 May 1985. She has two half-brothers. She grew up in Bray, County Wicklow, where she attended Loreto Secondary School, before studying journalism at Dublin City University.

== Career ==
=== Television ===
In April 2008, MTV Networks Europe launched a campaign Pick Me MTV where Whitmore competed to become the face of MTV News in MTV Europe. She won the competition, and between 2008 and 2015 hosted news bulletins for MTV across Europe. She was regularly seen on MTV News hosting special events in Ireland and elsewhere in Europe.

For five series from 2011, Whitmore hosted I'm a Celebrity...Get Me Out of Here! NOW! on ITV2 airing immediately after I'm a Celebrity...Get Me Out of Here! . Whitmore announced on 14 April 2016 that she was leaving the show.

In the summer of 2012, she appeared on the RTÉ television talk show, Saturday Night with Miriam, after carrying the 2012 Summer Olympics torch.

A pilot episode of songwriting-based talent show The Hit aired in September 2012 on RTÉ Two, hosted by Whitmore. On 15 March 2013, RTÉ announced that the show had been ordered for a full series which was broadcast in the summer, but Whitmore would not host due to a conflicting schedule in London. Aidan Power and Nicky Byrne presented the full series.

In April 2014, she co-hosted the 11th Irish Film & Television Awards with Simon Delaney.

In 2014, she joined the BBC Eurovision team as a commentator for the Eurovision Song Contest 2014 semi-finals in Copenhagen, Denmark alongside Scott Mills on BBC Three. She replaced Ana Matronic in the role, but did not return in 2015. In 2014, she was an occasional presenter of "The Hub" section on ITV's This Morning.

On 24 October 2014, she appeared in Channel 4's The Feeling Nuts Comedy Night to raise awareness of testicular cancer.

In February 2015, Whitmore left MTV News after seven years on the channel, but continued to present irregular segments and specials. Her last bulletin with the station was recorded on 26 February 2015.

On 10 August 2016, Whitmore took part in the fourteenth series of Strictly Come Dancing, beginning September 2016. She was partnered with Italian dancer Giovanni Pernice and was the sixth contestant to be voted out, on 5 November 2016, following a dance off with eventual series champions Ore Oduba and Joanne Clifton. She was the first contestant to complain of her treatment by Pernice saying “I was extremely uncomfortable with him. In the end, I felt broken. I cried every day.”

In 2018, she presented Survival of the Fittest, a reality series for ITV2, alongside comedian Brennan Reece.

On 20 December 2019, it was announced that Whitmore would host the sixth series of ITV2's Love Island in 2020 after Caroline Flack was arrested for assaulting her partner Lewis Burton. Following Flack's death while that was airing, Whitmore returned for the seventh series in June 2021.

At the series 6 finale of Love Island, Laura Whitmore did a quick 20-second tribute before the start of the final, following highlights of Flack's time as host of Love Island.

On 23 August 2022, it was announced that Whitmore would step down from hosting Love Island. One of the reasons for stepping down was Whitmore's new projects that were conflicting with her commitment to Love Island.

In April 2023, Whitmore began hosting her chatshow Laura Whitmore's Breakfast Show on ITV1 where she invites celebrity guests into her studio for a chat every Sunday at 8:30 am.

In July 2023, she released her ITVX documentary series Laura Whitmore Investigates which explores a number of controversial topics and the impact they have had on the world.

=== Other work ===
In 2003, Whitmore was a contestant in a modelling talent search on RTÉ One's The Late Late Show, reaching the final 15 of the competition.

In August 2009, she launched a self-branded clothing range available at A Wear.

In 2011, she appeared on the September cover of FHM magazine.

Whitmore is a spokeswoman for the Because I Am a Girl charity clothing campaign.

She collaborated with Daisy London on a jewellery collection in October 2015. The collection was inspired by music and features the recurring shape of the plectrum throughout.

In October 2014, she launched Misstache for Movember, a campaign for women to support and raise awareness of the men's health charity.

She appeared on FHM's 100 Sexiest 2015 list at number 37.

She features in the music video for "Skip to the Good Bit", a song by Rizzle Kicks and the music video for "Mark My Words" by The Coronas. In 2017, she played Cleo Morey alongside Shane Richie, Bill Ward and Stephen Billington in the stage adaptation of the Peter James book Not Dead Enough.

She hosted a weekly Sunday morning radio show on BBC Radio 5 Live between 2018 and 2022.

In September 2020, she was announced by Nintendo UK as a brand ambassador for the Nintendo Switch game Ring Fit Adventure and began appearing in a TV advertisement for the game.

On 4 March 2021, Whitmore's first book titled No One Can Change Your Life Except For You was released. In August 2022, it was announced that Whitmore would be joining the cast of 2:22 A Ghost Story on West End.

In November 2023 it was announced that Whitmore was cast in a lead role in the feature film ‘'A Mother for an Hour'’ which was due for release in 2024.

Since November 2023, Whitmore co-hosts a BBC Radio podcast alongside husband Iain Stirling entitled "Murder They Wrote with Laura Whitmore and Iain Stirling" in which they present true crime stories.

Whitmore starred in the lead role as Rachel Watson in the stage production The Girl on the Train from June to August 2025.

== Personal life ==
As of 2018, Whitmore lived in the Camden area of London. She married Scottish comedian Iain Stirling in a private humanist ceremony in 2020 at Dublin City Hall. Whitmore gave birth to their daughter in late March 2021. On 18 February 2026, Whitmore and Stirling announced that they were expecting their second child together.

== Filmography ==
Year	Title	Role
2013	Isle of Wight Festival	Co-presenter
2008–2015	MTV News Ireland	Presenter
2011–2015	I'm a Celebrity...Get Me Out of Here! NOW!	Anchor
2012	Beat TV	Co-presenter
2012	The Hit (pilot)	Presenter
2012–2016	The Hot Desk	Presenter
2012–2016	The Brits Backstage	Co-presenter
2014	11th Irish Film & Television Awards	Co-presenter
2014	This Morning	"The Hub" presenter
2016	The Brits Are Coming	Presenter
2016	V Festival 2016	Co-presenter
2016	Strictly Come Dancing	Contestant
2018	Survival of the Fittest	Presenter
2019	Sadhbh	Writer and actor
2020–2022	Love Island	Presenter
2020–2022	Love Island: Aftersun	Presenter
2020–present	Celebrity Gogglebox	Herself
2020–2022	Celebrity Juice	Team captain
2023	Laura Whitmore’s Breakfast Show	Host
2023	Laura Whitmore Investigates	Host

=== Music videos ===
Year	Title	Artist
2012	"Mark My Words"	The Coronas
2013	"Skip to the Good Bit"	Rizzle Kicks

Guest appearances

- Sunday Brunch (2012, 2015)
- The Xtra Factor (2012)
- Unzipped (2012)
- Saturday Night with Miriam (2012)
- Celebrity Juice (2012, 2014)
- Britain's Got More Talent (2012, 2013, 2016, 2018)
- Never Mind the Buzzcocks (2013)
- Sweat the Small Stuff (2013)
- Fake Reaction (2013, 2014)
- Sunday Side Up (2013)
- A League of Their Own (2014)
- Virtually Famous (2015)
- Celebrity Squares (2015)
- Alan Carr's New Year Spectacular (2016)
- Who Do You Think You Are? (2018)
- The Crystal Maze (2020)
- The Dumping Ground (2021)
- Would I Lie to You? (2021)
- Paul Sinha's TV Showdown (2021)
- Richard Osman's House of Games (2021, 2022)
- The Great Celebrity Bake Off for SU2C (2022)
- Saturday Kitchen (2022)
