= Corine Literature Prize =

German literary award

The Corine – International Book Prize, as it is officially called, is a German literature prize created by the Bavarian chapter of the Börsenverein des Deutschen Buchhandels and it was first awarded in 2001. It is awarded to German and international "authors for excellent literary achievements and their recognition by the public."

The award was last given in 2011. The successor award is the Bayerischer Buchpreis.

== Trophy ==
The "Corine" trophy is a figurine produced by the Nymphenburg Porcelain Manufactory in Munich, Germany. "Corine" was first manufactured in 1760 as part of a sixteen-figure set of commedia dell'arte performers in porcelain, designed by the German modeller Franz Anton Bustelli (1723–1763).

== Winners ==
=== 2001 ===
- Fiction: Zeruya Shalev for Mann und Frau
- Fiction: Henning Mankell for One Step Behind
- Non-fiction: Pascale N. Bercovitch for Das Lächeln des Delphins
- Non-fiction: Simon Singh for The Code Book
- Illustrated Non-fiction: The Beatles for The Beatles Anthology
- Children's Book: J. K. Rowling for Harry Potter and the Goblet of Fire
- Prize of Honour from the Bavarian Minister-President: Wolf Jobst Siedler for Ein Leben wird besichtigt
- Rolf Heyne First Book Prize: Manil Suri for The Death of Vishnu
- Weltbild Readers' Prize: Rosamunde Pilcher for Winter Solstice

=== 2002 ===
- Fiction: Paulo Coelho for The Alchemist
- Non-fiction: Waris Dirie for Desert Flower
- Illustrated Non-fiction: Jacques Perrin for Nomaden der Lüfte – Das Geheimnis der Zugvögel
- Children's Book: Astrid Lindgren posthumously, for life's work
- HypoVereinsbank Business Book Award: Prof. Meinhard Miegel for Die deformierte Gesellschaft. Wie die Deutschen ihre Wirklichkeit verdrängen
- Rolf Heyne First Book Prize: Sven Regener for Herr Lehmann
- Prize of Honour from the Bavarian Minister-President: Siegfried Lenz for his life's work
- Weltbild Readers' Prize: Barbara Wood for Sacred Ground

=== 2003 ===
- Fiction: Donna Leon, Wilful Behaviour
- Non-fiction: Inge and Walter Jens, Frau Thomas Mann
- Illustrated Non-fiction: Nina Hagen / Marcel Feige, That's Why The Lady Is A Punk
- Children's Book: Cornelia Funke, The Thief Lord
- HypoVereinsbank Business Book Award: Hans-Olaf Henkel, Die Ethik des Erfolgs
- Rolf Heyne First Book Prize: Jonathan Safran Foer, Everything Is Illuminated
- Prize of Honour from the Bavarian Minister-President: Nadine Gordimer for her life's work
- Weltbild Readers' Prize: Ken Follett, Jackdaws

=== 2004 ===
- Fiction: Frank Schätzing, The Swarm
- Non-fiction: Frank Schirrmacher, Das Methusalem-Komplott
- Children's Book: Ulrich Janßen, Ulla Steuernagel, Die Kinder-Uni
- Rolf Heyne First Book Prize: Louise Welsh, The Cutting Room
- Economics Book: Hans-Werner Sinn, Ist Deutschland noch zu retten?
- Audiobook: Schönherz & Fleer, Rilke Projekt, 1 bis 3
- Prize of Honour from the Bavarian Minister-President: Imre Kertész for his life's work
- Weltbild Readers' Prize: Patricia Shaw, The Five Winds
- Future Prize: Tad Williams, Otherland

=== 2005 ===
- Fiction: Per Olov Enquist, Das Buch von Blanche und Marie
- Non-fiction: Claus Kleber, Amerikas Kreuzzüge
- Children's Book: Kai Meyer, Frostfeuer
- Rolf Heyne First Book Prize: Eva Menasse, Vienna
- Economics Book: Jeremy Rifkin, The European Dream: How Europe's Vision of the Future Is Quietly Eclipsing the American Dream
- Prize of Honour from the Bavarian Minister-President: Walter Kempowski for his life's work
- Weltbild Readers' Prize: Cecelia Ahern, Für immer vielleicht
- Audiobook: Helma Sanders-Brahms, Tausendundeine Nacht
- Future Prize: Kurt G. Blüchel, Bionik

=== 2006 ===
- Fiction: Kazuo Ishiguro, Never Let Me Go
- Non-fiction: Neclà Kelek, Die verlorenen Söhne. Plädoyer für die Befreiung des türkisch-muslimischen Mannes
- Children's Book: Jonathan Stroud, Bartimäus. Die Pforte des Magiers
- Rolf Heyne First Book Prize: Bertina Henrichs, Die Schachspielerin
- Economics Book: Kurt Biedenkopf, Die Ausbeutung der Enkel
- Prize of Honour from the Bavarian Minister-President: Amos Oz for his life's work
- Weltbild Readers' Prize: Diana Gabaldon, Ein Hauch von Schnee und Asche
- Audiobook: Klaus Maria Brandauer und Birgit Minichmayr, Brandauer liest Mozart
- Future Prize: Tim Flannery, Wir Wettermacher

=== 2007 ===
- Fiction: Wilhelm Genazino, Mittelmäßiges Heimweh
- Non-fiction: Anne Siemens, Für die RAF war er das System, für mich der Vater - die andere Geschichte des deutschen Terrorismus
- Children's Book: Sergej Lukianenko, Das Schlangenschwert
- Rolf Heyne First Book Prize: Harald Martenstein, Heimweg
- Economics Book: Érik Orsenna, Weiße Plantagen – eine Reise durch unsere globalisierte Welt
- Prize of Honour from the Bavarian Minister-President: Peter Härtling for his life's work
- Weltbild Readers' Prize: Andrea Maria Schenkel (Author) and Monica Bleibtreu (Reader) for the book and audiobook Tannöd
- Audiobook: Hape Kerkeling, Ein Mann, ein Fjord

=== 2008 ===
- Fiction: Feridun Zaimoglu, Liebesbrand
- Non-fiction: Manfred Lütz, Gott. Eine kleine Geschichte des Größten
- Children's Book: Andreas Steinhöfel, Rico, Oskar und die Tieferschatten
- Bilderwelten: Nadine Barth (Hrsg.), Verschwindende Landschaften
- Economics Book: Paul Collier, The Bottom Billion
- Prize of Honour from the Bavarian Minister-President: Martin Walser for his life's work
- Future Prize: Muhammad Yunus, Die Armut besiegen
- Weltbild Readers' Prize: Volker Klüpfel, Michael Kobr, Laienspiel. Kluftingers neuer Fall
- Audiobook: Henning Mankell, The Man from Beijing (read by Axel Milberg)

=== 2009 ===
- Fiction: Mohammed Hanif, A Case of Exploding Mangoes
- Non-fiction: Richard von Weizsäcker, Der Weg zur Einheit
- Children's Book: Mirjam Pressler, Nathan und seine Kinder
- Bilderwelten: Alex MacLean, OVER: The American Landscape at the Tipping Point
- Economics Book: Reinhard Marx, Das Kapital. Ein Plädoyer für den Menschen
- Future Prize: Nicholas Stern, Der Global Deal
- Audiobook: Fred Vargas, Der verbotene Ort (gelesen von Barbara Nüsse)
- Prize of Honour from the Bavarian Minister-President: Rüdiger Safranski for his life's work

=== 2010 ===
- Fiction: Hans Joachim Schädlich, Kokoschkins Reise
- Audience Award: Carla Federico, Im Land der Feuerblume
- Young Adult Novel: John Green, Paper Towns
- Bilderwelten: Herlinde Koelbl, Mein Blick
- Economics Book: Wolfgang Kersting, Verteidigung des Liberalismus
- Future Prize: William Kamkwamba, Bryan Mealer, The Boy Who Harnessed the Wind: Creating Currents of Electricity and Hope
- Audiobook: Jo Nesbø, The Leopard (gelesen von Burkhart Klaußner)
- Prize of Honour from the Bavarian Minister-President: Herbert Rosendorfer for his life's work

=== 2011 ===
- Zeit Publishing Literature Award: John Burnside, A Lie About My Father
- Klassic Radio Audience Award: Juliane Koepcke, When I fell from the Sky
- Young Readers’ Award: Kate de Goldi, The 10 PM Question
- Bilderwelten: Elke Heidenreich, Tom Krausz, Dylan Thomas
- Business Book Award: Peter D. Schiff, Andrew J. Schiff, How an Economy Grows and Why it Crashes
- Future Prize: António Damásio, Self Comes to Mind : Constructing the Conscious Brain
- Audiobook: Axel Hacke, Ursula Mauder, The Best of My Love Life
- Prize of Honour from the Bavarian Minister-President: Christine Nöstlinger for her life's work
