= The Girl on the Stairs =

Book by Louise Welsh

- 2012 Hardback Edition
- Author: Louise Welsh
- Language: English
- Genre: Crime/Literary fiction
- Publisher: John Murray (UK)
- Publication date: 2012
- Publication place: Scotland
- Media type: Print (hardcover and paperback) E-book
- Pages: 278 (hardback)
- ISBN: 978-1-84854-648-6 (hardback)
- Preceded by: Naming the Bones

The Girl on the Stairs is the 5th psychological crime thriller by Scottish author Louise Welsh. The book was first published in 2012 by publisher John Murray. Welsh's first novel, The Cutting Room, won several literary prizes.

== Plot summary ==
This psychological thriller is set in Berlin. It revolves around the central character, Jane, who has recently moved from Glasgow to the city with her lover Petra. As Jane adjusts to her new life and pregnancy she becomes curious about the neighbour’s daughter Anna, the arguments she hears through the wall and Anna’s strange appearance on the stairs.

== Critical reception ==
As the plot unravels, this latest psychological thriller from Louise Welsh leaves the reader constantly guessing between what is real and what could be Jane’s imagination. According to one reviewer, Welsh skilfully moulded the plot into some fresh and horrible terrain." The Guardian and Observer reviewer described this novel as a "psychologically potent cross between The Yellow Wallpaper and Rear Window.".

== Other Works by Louise Welsh ==
- The Cutting Room (2002)
- Tamburlaine Must Die (2004)
- The Bullet Trick (2006)
- Naming The Bones (2010)
