= Glasgay! Festival =

LGBT+ arts festival in Glasgow, Scotland

Coordinates: 55.859°N 4.246°W

Glasgay! Festival was a gay, lesbian, bisexual and transgender arts festival in Glasgow, Scotland. From 1993 to 2014, it was part of the diversity of Glasgow's cultural scene, an annual Lesbian, Gay, Bisexual and Transgender Arts Festival held usually in October/November, formerly organised by GALA Scotland Ltd.

== History ==
Cordelia Ditton, the co-director of Gay Sweatshop, founded Glasgay! in response to the Section 28 legislation in 1988, which banned the promotion of homosexuality as an acceptable lifestyle. Ditton partnered with Glasgow-based freelance arts administrator Dominic D'Angelo in 1991.

The festival launched on Saturday 30 October 1993 as a biennial event with the goal of making the lesbian and gay communities of Glasgow more visible and changing public opinion about lesbian and gay people. Over 26,000 people attended between 30 October and the festival's end on 6 November.

There was some backlash to the festival, especially in regards to the festival being funded by public money. Local politicians like Glasgow City councillor, John Young said that the funding of the festival could lead to the city becoming "the San Francisco of Western Europe." The backlash led to the festival not operating in 1994, and again in 1996.

The 1995 festival launched on 27 October 1995. The operating company, GALA Scotland Ltd, was established in late 1995, after Ditton stepped down. The new board of directors was led by D'Angelo.

The festival was funded mainly on a year to year basis by the Scottish Arts Council and, subsequently its successor, Creative Scotland and Glasgow City Council. From 2007 to 2014 it enjoyed regular three-year funding agreements from the Scottish Arts Council and Creative Scotland. However, in 2015 this funding agreement was not renewed. The company entered a period of funding transition, during which they retired the festival. The company rebranded as Outspoken Arts Scotland.

The administrative, artistic, press & PR archive of the Glasgay! Festival 1993–2014 was transferred to Glasgow University's Scottish Theatre Archive in early 2018.

== Past work ==
The company commissioned 16 new works for theatre and funded over 40 co-productions since 2006. It worked with over 400 artists in its lifetime and regularly engaged both established mature talent as well as championing emergent talent.

In its history the festival has worked with many of the top gay and lesbian artists in the world. Names such as Ian McKellen, Simon Fanshawe, Donna McPhail, Edwin Morgan, Jackie Kay, Rhona Cameron, Annie Sprinkle, Penny Arcade, Bette Bourne, Diamanda Galas, Neil Bartlett, Scott Capurro, Pam Ann, Four Poofs and a Piano, Lypsinka, Louise Welsh, Marc Almond, Alan Carr, Zoë Strachan, Stewart Laing, and John Waters are amongst the many others that have graced Glasgow's stages.

=== Commissions ===
| Commissioned Work | Year | Writer | Ref |
|---|---|---|---|
| Donald Does Dusty | 2006 | Diane Torr | |
| Tamburlaine Must Die | 2007 | Louise Welsh | |
| Elysian Fields | 2008 | Derek McLuckie | |
| Insideout (Exhibition) (Note: Co-Commission with GOMA) | 2009 | Dani Marti | |
| Jesus, Queen of Heaven (Note: Co-Commission with GOMA) | 2009 | Jo Clifford | |
| A Child Made of Love | 2009 | Matthew McVarish | |
| Memory Cells | 2009 | Louise Welsh | |
| Playing Houses (Note: Co-produced with Arches) | 2009 | Martin O'Connor | |
| The Maw Broon Monologues | 2009 | Jackie Kay | |
| Panic Patterns | 2010 | Louise Welsh | |
| The Bridge | 2010 | Wendy Miller and Rachel Amey | |
| Edwin Morgan's Dreams and Other Nightmares (Note: Co-produced with Tron) | 2011 | Liz Lochhead | |
| Cured | 2013 | Stef Smith | |
| The New Maw Broon Monologues | 2013 | Jackie Kay | |
| Wilful Forgetting | 2013 | Donna Rutherford with Martin O'Connor | |
| Cardinal Sinne | 2014 | Raymond Burke | |

== Main venues ==
Venues included The Arches, Art School, the Centre for Contemporary Arts, Citizens Theatre, Glasgow Film Theatre, Glasgow Women's Library, Kelvingrove Art Gallery and Museum, King's Theatre, Royal Conservatoire of Scotland,https://www.glasgowwestend.co.uk/whatson/glasgay-festival2010.php St Andrew's in the Square, The Stand, Theatre Royal, Tron Theatre, and The Winchester Club.

== See also ==
- Culture in Glasgow
- LGBT rights in Scotland
- LGBT rights in the United Kingdom
- LGBT Youth Scotland
