= C. J. Hopkins =

American playwright, novelist, and political satirist

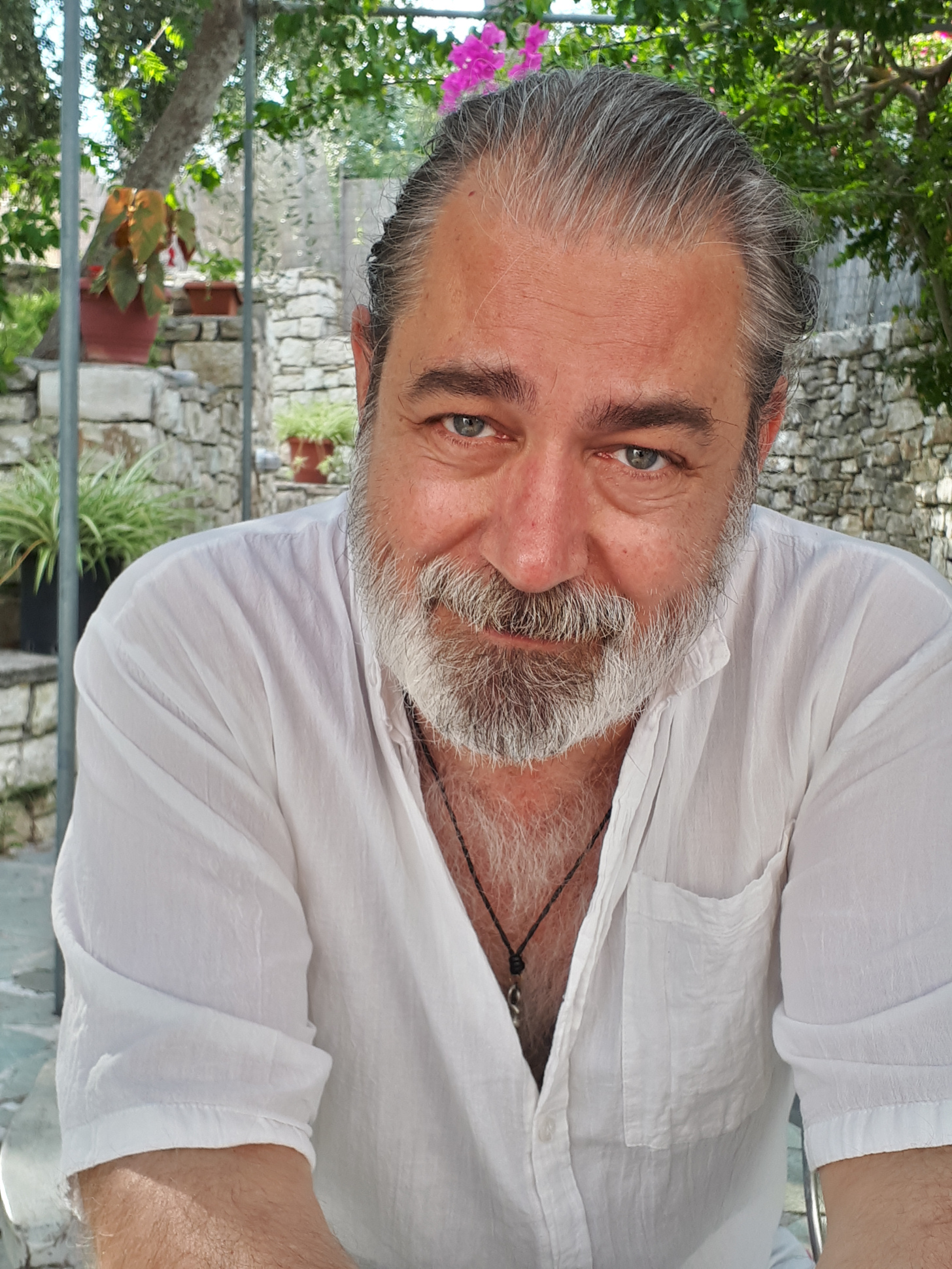
- Hopkins in 2018.
- Born: Christopher Hopkins; 1961 (age 64–65); Miami, Florida, U.S.
- Other name: Christopher Hopkins
- Occupations: Satirist; playwright; author; novelist
- Years active: 1990s–present
- Website: consentfactory.org

C. J. Hopkins (born 1961) is an American playwright, novelist, and political satirist. Among his works are the plays Horse Country, screwmachine/eyecandy and The Extremists.

== Career ==
=== Early works ===
Hopkins was a 1994 Drama League of New York Developing Artist Fellow and a 1995 Resident Artist/Jerome Foundation Fellow at Mabou Mines/Suite.

=== Horse Country ===
His 1992 play, Horse Country, had its UK premiere at the 2002 Edinburgh Festival Fringe. Lyn Gardner in The Guardian wrote: "Hopkins's two-hander brings the spirit of Godot to America's bars and puts the bourbon in Beckett. It feels like a serious piece of theatre rather than fringe fluff." It won a Scotsman Fringe First for New Writing and the 2002 Scotsman Best of the Fringe Firsts Award, and later won the 2004 Best of The Adelaide Fringe Award. Following its London premiere at Riverside Studios, Horse Country toured the UK, Australia, Canada and the Netherlands.

=== Later works ===
Hopkins' play screwmachine/eyecandy was copyrighted in 1994, but updated when it was performed a decade later. A production ran during the 2005 Edinburgh Festival Fringe at the Assembly Rooms when The Scotsman described it as a "dark and twisted comedy" about the American game show in which "the excesses of American culture are held up to the light, roundly lampooned and shown to be the poisonous, culturally carcinogenic threats that they really are." It received a Scotsman Fringe First Award for New Writing. The US production was presented at 59E59 Theaters in New York in 2006. Mark Blankenship wrote in his review for Variety: "Although he apes the themes of everything from 1984 to Series 7, a film about a murderous reality show, Hopkins delivers his dogmatism with heavy-handed arrogance." A production was presented at the PushPush theater in Decatur, Georgia in 2008, and it was performed at the San Francisco Fringe Festival in 2017.

Also in 2006, Hopkins' commission by the Free University of Berlin to write and direct a site-specific work, The Insurgency, was staged in German at the university's Philological Library.

His 2009 play The Extremists, commissioned by 7 Stages and directed by Walter D. Asmus, premiered in Berlin and Atlanta in 2010.

Hopkins' debut novel, Zone 23, was published in 2017. It "describes a post-catastrophic, ‘genetically-corrected’ corporatist society in which dissent has been pathologised". Dactyl Review described it as "a witty, nasty, erudite, Pynchonesque narrative, full of fleshed-out sleazy characters and a hyper-detailed alternative world".

Hopkins moved to Germany in 2004. In 2022, he tweeted pictures of the cover of his essay-collection The Rise of the New Normal Reich (2022). The cover included a swastika, and he was charged according to German law regarding "propaganda, the contents of which are intended to further the aims of a former National Socialist organization." Reporter James Kirchick commented that "One can call his method of argument likening anti-COVID policies to Nazism misguided, intellectually lazy, or tasteless—I personally find it to be all three—but endorsing "the aims" of National Socialism it is not." Hopkins was acquitted of the charge in Berlin District Court in January 2024. The prosecution appealed the acquittal, and he was convicted by the Berlin Superior Court in September 2024. In November 2025, Berlin police raided Hopkins' home and confiscated his computer, and he was indicted on new charges for publishing, distributing, and promoting the book.

== Bibliography ==
=== Plays ===
- Horse Country, Bloomsbury Publishing, ISBN 0413774074 (2004)
- screwmachine/eyecandy, Broadway Play Publishing Inc., ISBN 0881453382 (2007)
- The Extremists, Broadway Play Publishing Inc., ISBN 0881454419 (2010)
- The Insurgency, Bordercrossing Berlin, Verlagshaus J. Frank (2006)
- A Place Like This (2000)
- The Participants (2022)

=== Essays ===
- Trumpocalypse: Consent Factory Essays, Vol. I (2016-2017), Consent Factory Publishing (self-published), 2019 ISBN 3982146402
- The War on Populism: Consent Factory Essays, Vol. II (2018-2019), Consent Factory Publishing (self-published), 2020, ISBN 9783982146416
- The Rise of the New Normal Reich: Consent Factory Essays, Vol. III (2020-2021), Consent Factory Publishing (self-published), 2022, ISBN 9783982146423, Skyhorse Publishing/Tucker Carlson Books (second edition), 2026 ISBN 978-1-68358-578-7
- Fear and Loathing in the New Normal Reich: Consent Factory Essays, Vol. IV (2022-2024), Skyhorse Publishing, 2025 ISBN 978-1-5107-8392-8

=== Novels ===
- Zone 23, (self published, 2017) ISBN 978-3000555268, Arcade Publishing (second edition), 2025 ISBN 978-1-64821-144-7
