= The Extremists =

The Extremists may refer to:

- Extremists (comics), a team of supervillains in DC Comics Justice League titles
- The Extremists (play), a 2009 play by C.J. Hopkins
- The Extremists (professional wrestling), a professional wrestling tag team
