= Zoë Strachan =

Scottish novelist and university teacher, born 1975

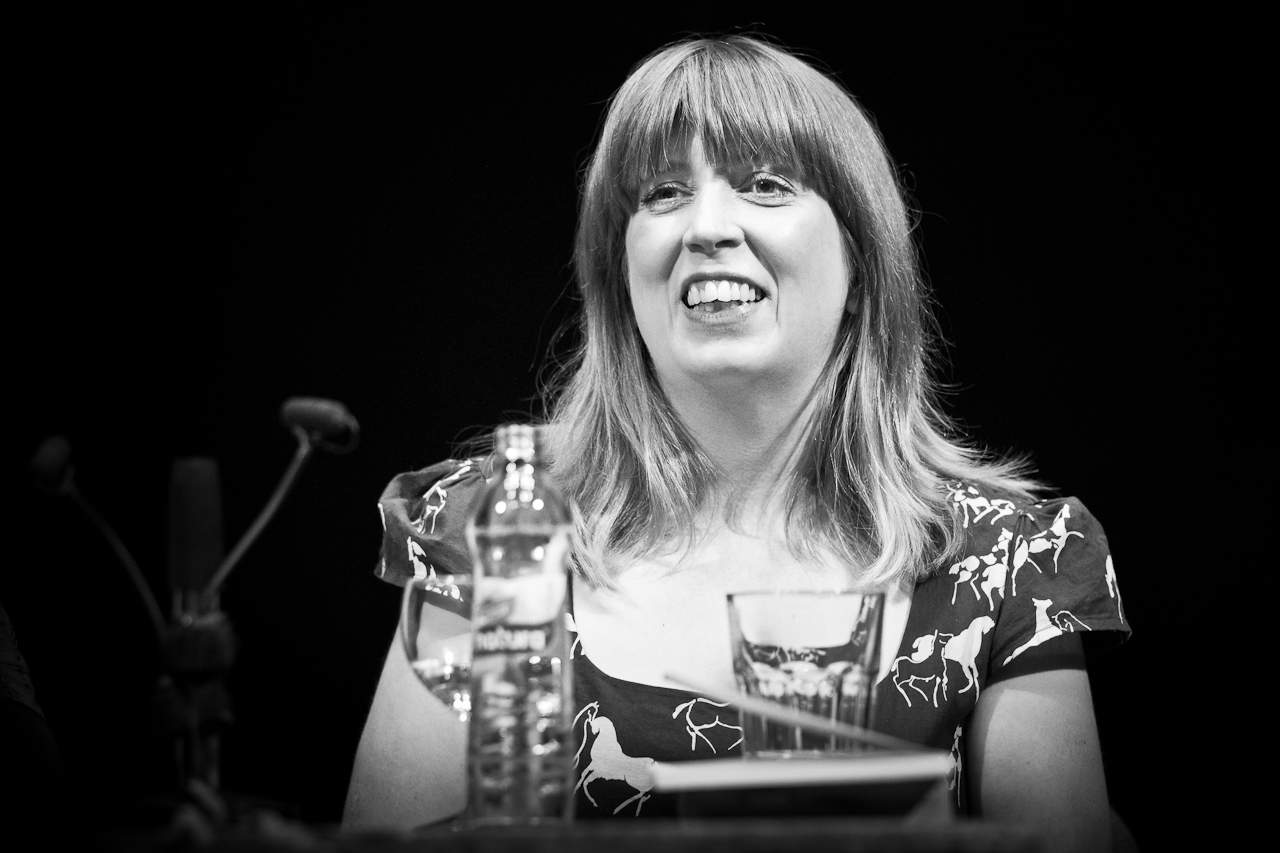
Zoë Strachan (2014)

Zoë Strachan (born 1975) is a Scottish novelist and journalist. She also teaches creative writing at the University of Glasgow.

== Early life and education ==
Strachan grew up in Kilmarnock, Ayrshire. She studied Archaeology and Philosophy at the University of Glasgow and earned a MPhil in Creative Writing at the universities of Glasgow and Strathclyde. She later herself became a creative writing tutor at the University of Glasgow. Strachan lives in Glasgow with her partner, the novelist Louise Welsh.

== Work ==
Strachan's work has been published in New Writing 15, Bordercrossing Berlin, The Edinburgh Companion to Contemporary Scottish Literature, and The Antigonish Review. In 2006 she was named the first Writer-in-Residence at the National Museum of Scotland in Edinburgh.

Her first novel, Negative Space, was published in 2002 by Picador. It won the Betty Trask Award in 2003 and was shortlisted for the Saltire First Book of the Year Award. Her second novel, in 2004, was Spin Cycle. In 2008 Strachan was awarded the Hermann Kesten Stipendium fellowship. In June 2009, she was on study leave, working mainly in Germany on a third novel, Play Dead. In 2014, she appeared as editor of an anthology of LGBT writing called Out There, published by Freight Books. In 2023, her fourth novel, Catch the Moments as They Fly, was published by Blackwater Press.

In 2011, Strachan took part in the International Writing Program Fall Residency at the University of Iowa in Iowa City, Iowa.

She and Louise Welsh contributed a short story, "Anyone Who Had a Heart", to Glasgow Women's Library's 21 Revolutions Project, in which 21 writers and 21 artists were chosen to create works for the 21st anniversary of Glasgow Women's Library.
