= Tamburlaine Must Die =

2004 novella written by Louise Welsh

- First edition
- Author: Louise Welsh
- Publisher: Canongate Books
- Publication date: 2004
- Pages: 160 pages
- ISBN: 1-84195-625-2
- OCLC: 57785232

Tamburlaine Must Die is a novella written by Louise Welsh, which imagines the last days of Christopher Marlowe's life in 1593. The novella was published in 2004 by Canongate Books.

== Plot ==
This novella is set in a plague-ridden London in 1593. Someone calling himself "Tamburlaine", the name of the hero in one of Marlowe's most famous plays, has written a libelous and heretical pamphlet in a style of writing similar to Marlowe's. Marlowe is called before the Privy Council which accuses him of writing the pamphlet; however, he protests his innocence. Marlowe is sentenced to death for this blasphemous writing and only has three days to figure out who really wrote the pamphlet and track that individual down. Marlowe becomes entangled in a web of intrigue, plots and counterplots before his eventual murder.

== Factual basis ==
The novella is based on the last days of Marlowe's life. An individual writing under the name Tamburlaine published a bill about London threatening Protestant refugees who had settled in the city. The author wrote in the same style and alluded to Marlowe several times. A few short days later, Marlowe was murdered by an acquaintance after arguing over a bill. To this day, there is still controversy regarding the reasons for and circumstances of Marlowe's death.

The title of the novella was taken from the last words spoken by Tamburlaine in Marlowe's play Tamburlaine the Great: "Tamburlaine, the scourge of God, must die."

== Reception ==
The novella has received both praise and criticism, called a "gothic thriller" and "existential puzzle piece". On the negative side, one reviewer felt the "narrative fails to convey adequately the sense of trepidation and urgency that one would expect from such a desperate man" and Alan Wall in The Guardian called it "buccaneering tosh".

== Play adaptation ==
Fittingly for a novella based on a famous playwright, the book was adapted for the stage by Kenny Miller in 2007. Miller also transformed and directed Welsh's first novel, The Cutting Room, into a stage production. The play was produced by Glasgay! and Tron Theatre in Glasgow.
