= List of Friday Night with Jonathan Ross episodes =

Friday Night with Jonathan Ross is a British chat show which was broadcast on BBC One from 2 November 2001 to 16 July 2010. 275 episodes were shown throughout the course of eighteen series.

== Series overview ==
Series	Episodes	Originally released	
Series	Episodes	First released	Last released
1	7	2 November 2001	21 December 2001
2	13	8 March 2002	7 June 2002
3	9	18 October 2002	20 December 2002
4	12	21 March 2003	13 June 2003
5	14	12 September 2003	19 December 2003
6	15	12 March 2004	9 July 2004
7	16	3 September 2004	24 December 2004
8	15	18 March 2005	1 July 2005
9	15	9 September 2005	23 December 2005
10	15	24 March 2006	7 July 2006
11	15	8 September 2006	22 December 2006
12	15	23 March 2007	6 July 2007
13	15	7 September 2007	21 December 2007
14	26	11 January 2008	11 July 2008
15	8	5 September 2008	24 October 2008
16	25	23 January 2009	24 July 2009
17	16	4 September 2009	11 December 2009
18	25	15 January 2010	16 July 2010

== Episodes ==
=== Series 1 (2001) ===
No. overall	No. in series	Title	Guests	Original release date
1	1	"Series 1, Episode 1"	John Lydon • Neil Hannon • Tamzin Outhwaite	2 November 2001
2	2	"Series 1, Episode 2"	Richard Harris • Kim Cattrall • Elton John	9 November 2001
3	3	"Series 1, Episode 3"	George Foreman • Ronni Ancona • Björk • Paul McCartney	23 November 2001
4	4	"Series 1, Episode 4"	Barbara Windsor • Tracey Emin • Mark Lamarr • Samantha Mumba	30 November 2001
5	5	"Series 1, Episode 5"	Bruce Forsyth • Fay Ripley • Rich Hall • Kelly Jones	7 December 2001
6	6	"Series 1, Episode 6"	Ronan Keating • David Blaine • Ronnie Wood	14 December 2001
7	7	"Series 1, Episode 7"	Jack Dee • Jarvis Cocker • Sophie Ellis-Bextor	21 December 2001

=== Series 2 (2002) ===
No. overall	No. in series	Title	Guests	Original release date
8	1	"Series 2, Episode 1"	June Brown • Melanie Brown • Johnny Vegas	8 March 2002
9	2	"Series 2, Episode 2"	Charlotte Church • Reeves & Mortimer • Lenny Kravitz	15 March 2002
10	3	"Series 2, Episode 3"	Liza Minnelli • Pet Shop Boys • Eddie Izzard	22 March 2002
11	4	"Series 2, Episode 4"	Cliff Richard • Carol Smillie • Elvis Costello	29 March 2002
12	5	"Series 2, Episode 5"	Hugh Jackman • Marianne Faithfull • Leslie Phillips	5 April 2002
13	6	"Series 2, Episode 6"	Richard and Judy • Gary Lineker • Alistair McGowan	19 April 2002
14	7	"Series 2, Episode 7"	Kacey Ainsworth • Alex Ferns • Donal MacIntyre • Peter Kay • Sugababes	26 April 2002
15	8	"Series 2, Episode 8"	John Mills • Zoe Ball • Ozzy Osbourne	10 May 2002
16	9	"Series 2, Episode 9"	George Best • Davina McCall • Sanjeev Bhaskar • Black Rebel Motorcycle Club	17 May 2002
17	10	"Series 2, Episode 10"	Martine McCutcheon • Julian Clary • Stephen Fry • No Doubt	24 May 2002
18	11	"Series 2, Episode 11"	Dale Winton • Phill Jupitus • Tom Jones • Red Hot Chili Peppers	31 May 2002
19	12	"Series 2, Episode 12"	Jeremy Clarkson • Goldie • Ronnie Corbett • The Damned	7 June 2002
20	13	"Series 2, Episode 13 (special)"	Friday Night with Ross and Bowie - David Bowie	5 July 2002

=== Series 3 (2002) ===
No. overall	No. in series	Title		Original release date
21	1	"Series 3, Episode 1"	Ulrika Jonsson • Ross Noble • Cilla Black • Tom Jones	18 October 2002
22	2	"Series 3, Episode 2"	Deborah Harry • Omid Djalili • Dale Winton • Tom Jones • Manic Street Preachers	25 October 2002
23	3	"Series 3, Episode 3"	Kylie Minogue • Rob Brydon • Tenacious D	1 November 2002
24	4	"Series 3, Episode 4"	Ricky Gervais • Michael Moore • Robson Green • Sophie Ellis-Bextor	8 November 2002
25	5	"Series 3, Episode 5"	Alan Davies • David Blaine • Enrique Iglesias • Ms. Dynamite	22 November 2002
26	6	"Series 3, Episode 6"	Lee Evans • Anastacia • Terry Wogan • Turin Brakes	29 November 2002
27	7	"Series 3, Episode 7"	John McEnroe • David Attenborough • Melinda Messenger • Laurence Llewelyn-Bowen • Supergrass	6 December 2002
28	8	"Series 3, Episode 8"	Roger Moore • June Sarpong • Jack Dee • Bryan Ferry	13 December 2002
29	9	"Series 3, Episode 9"	Joanna Lumley • Avid Merrion • Derren Brown • Eddie Izzard • Doves	20 December 2002

=== Series 4 (2003) ===
No. overall	No. in series	Title		Original release date
30	1	"Series 4, Episode 1"	Doon Mackichan • Lucy Benjamin • Paul O'Grady • Placebo	21 March 2003
31	2	"Series 4, Episode 2"	Martin Freeman • Jo Brand • Yoko Ono • Moloko	28 March 2003
32	3	"Series 4, Episode 3"	Rhona Cameron • Alan Cumming • Noddy Holder • Honor Blackman • The Vessels	4 April 2003
33	4	"Series 4, Episode 4"	Vernon Kay • Minnie Driver • Ian Wright • Blur	18 April 2003
34	5	"Series 4, Episode 5"	Shane Richie • Craig David • Famke Janssen • Feeder	25 April 2003
35	6	"Series 4, Episode 6"	Madonna	2 May 2003
36	7	"Series 4, Episode 7"	James Nesbitt • Alistair McGowan • Lisa Marie Presley • The Dandy Warhols	9 May 2003
37	8	"Series 4, Episode 8"	Darius Danesh • Denise Lewis • Nigel Havers • Cerys Matthews	16 May 2003
38	9	"Series 4, Episode 9"	Carol Vorderman • Melanie C • Phil Tufnell • Super Furry Animals	23 May 2003
39	10	"Series 4, Episode 10"	Leslie Grantham • Avid Merrion • Shania Twain • Radiohead	30 May 2003
40	11	"Series 4, Episode 11"	Simon Cowell • Charlotte Church • Marilyn Manson	6 June 2003
41	12	"Series 4, Episode 12"	Chris Tarrant • Johnny Vegas • Jim Carrey • The Coral	13 June 2003

=== Series 5 (2003) ===
No. overall	No. in series	Title		Original release date
42	1	"Series 5, Episode 1"	Julie Walters • Jack Dee • Lisa Maffia • David Bowie	12 September 2003
43	2	"Series 5, Episode 2"	Kate Beckinsale • Lee Evans • Sting	19 September 2003
44	3	"Series 5, Episode 3"	Chris Eubank • Michael Madsen • Rachel Stevens • Finley Quaye	26 September 2003
45	4	"Series 5, Episode 4"	Bill Bailey • Uma Thurman • Quentin Tarantino • Har Mar Superstar	3 October 2003
46	5	"Series 5, Episode 5"	Nigella Lawson • Mackenzie Crook • Jamie Theakston • Blur	10 October 2003
47	6	"Series 5, Episode 6"	Alan Davies • Felicity Kendal • 50 Cent	17 October 2003
48	7	"Series 5, Episode 7"	Harry Hill • Martine McCutcheon • Griff Rhys Jones • Primal Scream	24 October 2003
49	8	"Series 5, Episode 8"	Dermot O'Leary • Alicia Keys • Paul O'Grady • The Flaming Lips	31 October 2003
50	9	"Series 5, Episode 9"	Samuel L. Jackson • Bruce Forsyth • Alex Parks • Radiohead	7 November 2003
51	10	"Series 5, Episode 10"	Nigel Harman • Leslie Ash • Ricky Gervais • Kings of Leon	14 November 2003
52	11	"Series 5, Episode 11"	Russell Crowe • Paul Bettany • Jessie Wallace • The Thrills	28 November 2003
53	12	"Series 5, Episode 12"	Matt Lucas • David Walliams • Boris Becker • Ozzy Osbourne • Kelly Osbourne • The Strokes	5 December 2003
54	13	"Series 5, Episode 13"	Bob Geldof • Richard Briers • Avid Merrion • Tim Burgess	12 December 2003
55	14	"Series 5, Episode 14"	Victoria Beckham • Ian McKellen • Johnny Vegas • Gary Jules • Michael Andrews • The Raveonettes	19 December 2003

=== Series 6 (2004) ===
No. overall	No. in series	Title		Original release date
56	1	"Series 6, Episode 1"	Liza Tarbuck • John Lydon • Ben Stiller • Owen Wilson • Starsailor	12 March 2004
57	2	"Series 6, Episode 2"	John Hurt • Martin Freeman • Shane Richie • Amy Winehouse • The Libertines	19 March 2004
58	3	"Series 6, Episode 3"	Simon Pegg • Emma Bunton • Richard Wilson • Scissor Sisters	26 March 2004
59	4	"Series 6, Episode 4"	Charlize Theron • Kris Marshall • Des Lynam • Muse	2 April 2004
60	5	"Series 6, Episode 5"	Jools Holland • Julia Stiles • Omar Sharif • Aqualung	9 April 2004
61	6	"Series 6, Episode 6"	Tara Palmer-Tomkinson • Kate Bosworth • Alan Davies • Busted	16 April 2004
62	7	"Series 6, Episode 7"	Terry Wogan • Jane Leeves • Frank Skinner • The Bees	23 April 2004
63	8	"Series 6, Episode 8"	Bill Bailey • Jodie Kidd • Clive Owen • The Streets	30 April 2004
64	9	"Series 6, Episode 9"	Eric Bana • Jamelia • Ricky Tomlinson • Matthew Lillard • Damien Rice	7 May 2004
65	10	"Series 6, Episode 10"	Dale Winton • Ronnie O'Sullivan • Morrissey	14 May 2004
66	11	"Series 6, Episode 11"	Carol Vorderman • Eddie Izzard • Will Young • Franz Ferdinand	21 May 2004
67	12	"Series 6, Episode 12"	Elliott Gould • Jake Gyllenhaal • Janet Jackson • Jet	28 May 2004
68	13	"Series 6, Episode 13"	Patrick Stewart • Lucy Davis • David Duchovny • Supergrass	4 June 2004
69	14	"Series 6, Episode 14"	Ilie Năstase • Kelis • Gordon Ramsay • The Cure	11 June 2004
70	15	"Series 6, Episode 15 (Sport Relief special)"	Nancy Dell'Olio • Lenny Kravitz • David James • Dwayne 'The Rock' Johnson • Neil Hannon	9 July 2004

=== Series 7 (2004) ===
No. overall	No. in series	Title		Original release date
71	1	"Series 7, Episode 1"	Paul Newman • Christian Slater • Jack Dee • Paul Weller • The 5.6.7.8's	3 September 2004
72	2	"Series 7, Episode 2"	Tim Robbins • Josh Hartnett • Noel Gallagher • Ian Brown • The Libertines	10 September 2004
73	3	"Series 7, Episode 3"	Ray Winstone • Gary Lineker • Kim Woodburn • Aggie MacKenzie • PJ Harvey	17 September 2004
74	4	"Series 7, Episode 4"	Trinny and Susannah • Paul Bettany • Cybill Shepherd • Robbie Williams	24 September 2004
75	5	"Series 7, Episode 5"	Ewan McGregor • Charley Boorman • Geoffrey Rush • Nancy Sinatra • The Hives	1 October 2004
76	6	"Series 7, Episode 6"	Graham Norton • Björk • Duran Duran	8 October 2004
77	7	"Series 7, Episode 7"	Minnie Driver • Lee Evans • Stephen Fry • The Mooney Suzuki	15 October 2004
78	8	"Series 7, Episode 8"	Ringo Starr • Frankie Dettori • Rob Brydon • Nick Cave and the Bad Seeds	22 October 2004
79	9	"Series 7, Episode 9"	Barbara Windsor • Geri Halliwell • Sarah Michelle Gellar • The Killers	29 October 2004
80	10	"Series 7, Episode 10"	Pierce Brosnan • Peter Kay • Gwen Stefani • Fatboy Slim	5 November 2004
81	11	"Series 7, Episode 11"	Holly Hunter • Jimmy Carr • Elton John	12 November 2004
82	12	"Series 7, Episode 12"	Ricky Gervais • Rhys Ifans • Sheila Hancock • Keane	26 November 2004
83	13	"Series 7, Episode 13"	Matt Lucas • David Walliams • Jessica Stevenson • U2	3 December 2004
84	14	"Series 7, Episode 14"	Kim Cattrall • Dara Ó Briain • Bruce Forsyth • Kings of Leon	10 December 2004
85	15	"Series 7, Episode 15"	Martin Scorsese • Cilla Black • Johnny Vegas • The Beautiful South	17 December 2004
86	16	"Series 7, Episode 16"	Delia Smith • Rupert Everett • Blue • Franz Ferdinand	24 December 2004

=== Series 8 (2005) ===
No. overall	No. in series	Title		Original release date
87	1	"Series 8, Episode 1"	Penélope Cruz • Boy George • Lennox Lewis • Beck	18 March 2005
88	2	"Series 8, Episode 2"	Christopher Eccleston • Sally Lindsay • Julian Clary • Kasabian	25 March 2005
89	3	"Series 8, Episode 3"	David Carradine • Natalie Imbruglia • Eddie Izzard • Garbage • PJ Harvey	1 April 2005
90	4	"Series 8, Episode 4"	Nicole Kidman • David Schwimmer • Shirley Ghostman • Doves	15 April 2005
91	5	"Series 8, Episode 5"	Robert Downey Jr. • Jane Krakowski • Pamela Anderson • The Tears	22 April 2005
92	6	"Series 8, Episode 6"	Joely Richardson • Martin Freeman • Alan Sugar • The Dears	29 April 2005
93	7	"Series 8, Episode 7"	Juliette Lewis • Colin McAllister • Justin Ryan • Bradley Walsh • Oasis	6 May 2005
94	8	"Series 8, Episode 8"	David Hasselhoff • The League of Gentlemen • Kelly Osbourne • New Order	13 May 2005
95	9	"Series 8, Episode 9"	Gordon Ramsay • Priscilla Presley • Bob Mortimer • Steve Coogan • Ben Folds	20 May 2005
96	10	"Series 8, Episode 10"	Mickey Rourke • Zöe Lucker • Goran Višnjić • Jay Kay • Jamiroquai	27 May 2005
97	11	"Series 8, Episode 11"	Jane Fonda • Fern Britton • Tommy Lee • Vince Neil • Coldplay	3 June 2005
98	12	"Series 8, Episode 12"	Bob Geldof • Teri Hatcher • Charlotte Church	10 June 2005
99	13	"Series 8, Episode 13"	Serena Williams • Ian McShane • James Nesbitt • Turin Brakes	17 June 2005
100	14	"Series 8, Episode 14"	Jennifer Connelly • Nigel Harman • Michael Palin • Moby	24 June 2005
101	15	"Series 8, Episode 15"	Bob Geldof • Ricky Gervais • Joss Stone • James Brown	1 July 2005

=== Series 9 (2005) ===
No. overall	No. in series	Title		Original release date
102	1	"Series 9, Episode 1"	Joan Rivers • Jack Dee • Helen Mirren • The Black Eyed Peas	9 September 2005
103	2	"Series 9, Episode 2"	Alan Whicker • Gérard Depardieu • Franz Ferdinand • Kanye West	16 September 2005
104	3	"Series 9, Episode 3"	Catherine Deneuve • Catherine Tate • Ricky Martin • Simple Minds	23 September 2005
105	4	"Series 9, Episode 4"	Lee Evans • Louis Theroux • Tracy-Ann Oberman • Louis XIV	30 September 2005
106	5	"Series 9, Episode 5"	Sharon Osbourne • Lee Ryan • Bob Hoskins • Ms. Dynamite	7 October 2005
107	6	"Series 9, Episode 6"	Emma Thompson • Jordan • Peter Andre • Rob Brydon • Hard-Fi	14 October 2005
108	7	"Series 9, Episode 7"	Des Lynam • Alan Davies • Kristin Scott Thomas • Robbie Williams	21 October 2005
109	8	"Series 9, Episode 8"	Stephen Fry • Guy Pearce • Jade Goody • The Magic Numbers	28 October 2005
110	9	"Series 9, Episode 9"	Woody Harrelson • Daniel Radcliffe • Sharleen Spiteri • Kaiser Chiefs	4 November 2005
111	10	"Series 9, Episode 10"	Cameron Diaz • Jimmy Carr • Shane Richie • Toni Collette • Green Day	11 November 2005
112	11	"Series 9, Episode 11"	Patrick Swayze • Damon Albarn • Jamie Hewlett • Murdoc & Noodle • Jeremy Clarkson • Anohni and the Johnsons	25 November 2005
113	12	"Series 9, Episode 12"	Patsy Kensit • Harry Hill • Sarah Jessica Parker • Coldplay	2 December 2005
114	13	"Series 9, Episode 13"	Jack Black • Will Young • Jools Holland • Paul Weller	9 December 2005
115	14	"Series 9, Episode 14"	Take That • Dara Ó Briain • Claudia Winkleman • Ray Winstone • Kubb	16 December 2005
116	15	"Series 9, Episode 15"	David Tennant • Ashley Jensen • Chico • Steve Coogan • Rob Brydon • Richard Ashcroft	23 December 2005

=== Series 10 (2006) ===
No. overall	No. in series	Title		Original release date
117	1	"Series 10, Episode 1"	David Attenborough • Morrissey • Gavin Henson • Pink	24 March 2006
118	2	"Series 10, Episode 2"	Ant & Dec • Alan Sugar • Tamsin Greig • Gorillaz	31 March 2006
119	3	"Series 10, Episode 3"	Carmen Electra • Joan Rivers • Johnny Vegas • Red Hot Chili Peppers	14 April 2006
120	4	"Series 10, Episode 4"	Graham Norton • Dita Von Teese • Tom Jones • Chicane	21 April 2006
121	5	"Series 10, Episode 5"	Justin Hawkins • David Morrissey • Dennis Waterman • Amanda Redman • Dirty Pretty Things	28 April 2006
122	6	"Series 10, Episode 6"	Kristin Davis • Kiefer Sutherland • Antony Worrall Thompson • Primal Scream	5 May 2006
123	7	"Series 10, Episode 7"	Uma Thurman • Russell Brand • Ian McKellen • Graham Coxon	12 May 2006
124	8	"Series 10, Episode 8"	Paul Bettany • William Shatner • Yeah Yeah Yeahs	19 May 2006
125	9	"Series 10, Episode 9"	Hugh Jackman • Halle Berry • Lorraine Kelly • John Simm • The Concretes	26 May 2006
126	10	"Series 10, Episode 10"	Noel Edmonds • Jon Bon Jovi • Preston & Chantelle • Keane	2 June 2006
127	11	"Series 10, Episode 11"	Jo Frost • Alan Carr • Teri Hatcher • The Kooks	9 June 2006
128	12	"Series 10, Episode 12"	Peter Kay • Vic Reeves • John Malkovich • Muse	16 June 2006
129	13	"Series 10, Episode 13"	Bruce Willis • David Cameron • Martina Navratilova • The Raconteurs	23 June 2006
130	14	"Series 10, Episode 14"	Anjelica Huston • Rolf Harris • McFly • Razorlight	30 June 2006
131	15	"Series 10, Episode 15"	Dominic Monaghan • Jon Culshaw • Pete Doherty • The Zutons	7 July 2006

=== Series 11 (2006) ===
No. overall	No. in series	Title		Original release date
132	1	"Series 11, Episode 1"	Julie Walters • Ricky Gervais • The Killers	8 September 2006
133	2	"Series 11, Episode 2"	Terry Wogan • Julianne Moore • Will Ferrell • Scissor Sisters	15 September 2006
134	3	"Series 11, Episode 3"	Brenda Blethyn • Sophie Anderton • Ian Wright • Sparks	22 September 2006
135	4	"Series 11, Episode 4"	Adam Sandler • Lily Allen • Jamie Oliver • New York Dolls	29 September 2006
136	5	"Series 11, Episode 5"	Mitchell and Webb • Gary Barlow • Gordon Ramsay • Zach Braff • Snow Patrol • Martha Wainwright	6 October 2006
137	6	"Series 11, Episode 6"	Russell Crowe • Amir Khan • Lee Mack • Jade Goody • The Gossip	13 October 2006
138	7	"Series 11, Episode 7"	Billie Piper • Michael Ball • Catherine Tate • Jack Dee • Kasabian	20 October 2006
139	8	"Series 11, Episode 8"	Borat • All Saints • Smokey Robinson • Gnarls Barkley	27 October 2006
140	9	"Series 11, Episode 9"	Julio Iglesias • Tenacious D • Ben Affleck • Jet	3 November 2006
141	10	"Series 11, Episode 10"	The Mighty Boosh • John Barrowman • Emma Thompson • Gwen Stefani	10 November 2006
142	11	"Series 11, Episode 11"	Courtney Love • Jeremy Clarkson • David Schwimmer • Simon Pegg • Juliette and the Licks	24 November 2006
143	12	"Series 11, Episode 12"	Nigella Lawson • Elijah Wood • Dylan Moran • The Fratellis	1 December 2006
144	13	"Series 11, Episode 13"	Denzel Washington • Girls Aloud • Dara Ó Briain • Guillemots	8 December 2006
145	14	"Series 11, Episode 14"	Jimmy Carr • Cat Deeley • Don Johnson • Boy George • Amanda Ghost • Tenacious D	15 December 2006
146	15	"Series 11, Episode 15"	Richard Hammond • Lee Evans • Jarvis Cocker	22 December 2006

=== Series 12 (2007) ===
No. overall	No. in series	Title		Original release date
147	1	"Series 12, Episode 1"	Ricky Hatton • Daniel Radcliffe • Thandie Newton	23 March 2007
148	2	"Series 12, Episode 2"	Gareth Gates • Ricky Gervais • John Travolta • Macy Gray	30 March 2007
149	3	"Series 12, Episode 3"	Ursula Andress • Jamie Cullum • Mark Strong • My Chemical Romance	13 April 2007
150	4	"Series 12, Episode 4"	Gilbert & George • Patsy Kensit • Alan Carr • Bryan Ferry	20 April 2007
151	5	"Series 12, Episode 5"	Tobey Maguire • Kirsten Dunst • Sarah Brightman • Bill Bailey • Jamie T	27 April 2007
152	6	"Series 12, Episode 6"	Rob Brydon • Greg Rusedski • Helena Bonham Carter • The View	4 May 2007
153	7	"Series 12, Episode 7"	Alan Sugar • Fern Britton • Phillip Schofield • Rufus Wainwright • Kaiser Chiefs	11 May 2007
154	8	"Series 12, Episode 8"	Eddie Izzard • Janice Dickinson • Andrew Lloyd Webber • John Barrowman • Regina Spektor	18 May 2007
155	9	"Series 12, Episode 9"	Justin Lee Collins • Freema Agyeman • Ozzy Osbourne	25 May 2007
156	10	"Series 12, Episode 10"	Gordon Ramsay • Tori Spelling • Bear Grylls • Klaxons	1 June 2007
157	11	"Series 12, Episode 11"	Myleene Klass • Nick Frost • Andy Roddick • My Chemical Romance	8 June 2007
158	12	"Series 12, Episode 12"	Rob Lowe • Alex James • Shilpa Shetty • CSS	15 June 2007
159	13	"Series 12, Episode 13"	Serena Williams • Russell Brand • Iggy and the Stooges	22 June 2007
160	14	"Series 12, Episode 14"	Bruce Willis • Fearne Cotton • Pete Doherty • Arcade Fire	29 June 2007
161	15	"Series 12, Episode 15"	J. K. Rowling • Bob Hoskins • Gok Wan • Arctic Monkeys • Paul Weller • Graham Coxon	6 July 2007

=== Series 13 (2007) ===
No. overall	No. in series	Title		Original release date
162	1	"Series 13, Episode 1"	Keira Knightley • Adam Sandler • Simon Pegg • The Polyphonic Spree	7 September 2007
163	2	"Series 13, Episode 2"	Quentin Tarantino • Samuel L. Jackson • Trinny and Susannah • KT Tunstall	14 September 2007
164	3	"Series 13, Episode 3"	Richard Hammond • Helen Mirren • Christian Slater • The Hives	21 September 2007
165	4	"Series 13, Episode 4"	Jamie Foxx • Michael Ball • Beth Ditto • Peter Bjorn and John	28 September 2007
166	5	"Series 13, Episode 5"	Michelle Pfeiffer • Chris Moyles • Ewan McGregor • Charley Boorman • Róisín Murphy	5 October 2007
167	6	"Series 13, Episode 6"	Jake Gyllenhaal • Jools Holland • Katie Price • Peter Andre • Richard Hawley	12 October 2007
168	7	"Series 13, Episode 7"	Take That • Terry Wogan • Peter Serafinowicz • Kelly Smith	19 October 2007
169	8	"Series 13, Episode 8"	Cate Blanchett • Heston Blumenthal • Penny Lancaster • Kelly Brook • Duran Duran	26 October 2007
170	9	"Series 13, Episode 9"	Gordon Ramsay • Girls Aloud • Ruth Jones • James Corden • Alicia Keys	2 November 2007
171	10	"Series 13, Episode 10"	Anthony Hopkins • Jimmy Carr • Katy Brand • Foo Fighters	9 November 2007
172	11	"Series 13, Episode 11"	Jack Dee • Russell Brand • Daniel Craig • Hard-Fi	23 November 2007
173	12	"Series 13, Episode 12"	Hugh Fearnley-Whittingstall • Julian Barratt • Noel Fielding • Boyzone • Kate Nash	30 November 2007
174	13	"Series 13, Episode 13"	Jerry Seinfeld • Renée Zellweger • Jeremy Clarkson • Matt Lucas • David Walliams • Adele	7 December 2007
175	14	"Series 13, Episode 14"	Will Smith • Len Goodman • Arlene Phillips • Bruno Tonioli • Craig Revel Horwood • Kerry Katona • Editors	14 December 2007
176	15	"Series 13, Episode 15"	Andrew Flintoff • Stephen Merchant • Christopher Biggins • Janice Dickinson • Mark Ronson • Ricky Wilson • Candie Payne	21 December 2007

=== Series 14 (2008) ===
No. overall	No. in series	Title		Original release date
177	1	"Series 14, Episode 1"	Tom Hanks • Chris Rock • Hannah Spearritt • Andrew-Lee Potts • Reverend and the Makers	11 January 2008
178	2	"Series 14, Episode 2"	David Attenborough • Samantha Womack • Rita Simons • Ringo Starr • Hot Chip	18 January 2008
179	3	"Series 14, Episode 3"	Jeff Goldblum • Eva Longoria • Alan Carr • Mary J. Blige	25 January 2008
180	4	"Series 14, Episode 4"	Britt Ekland • Naveen Andrews • Sarah Parish • Sharon Small • Shelley Conn • Orla Brady • Morrissey	1 February 2008
181	5	"Series 14, Episode 5"	Vivienne Westwood • Jamie Bell • Philip Glenister • Duffy	8 February 2008
182	6	"Series 14, Episode 6"	Sylvester Stallone • Nicholas Hoult • Katherine Jenkins • Guillemots	15 February 2008
183	7	"Series 14, Episode 7"	Forest Whitaker • Bruce Forsyth • Agyness Deyn • Elbow	22 February 2008
184	8	"Series 14, Episode 8"	Dwayne Johnson • Gillian McKeith • Keeley Hawes • Goldfrapp	29 February 2008
185	9	"Series 14, Episode 9"	Goldie Hawn • Michelle Ryan • Jean-Christophe Novelli • The Temptations	7 March 2008
186	10	"Series 14, Episode Special"	Friday Night with Ross & Parkinson – Michael Parkinson	14 March 2008
187	11	"Series 14, Episode 10"	Twiggy • David Baddiel • Gunther von Hagens • Siouxsie	21 March 2008
188	12	"Series 14, Episode 11"	Donald Sutherland • Trevor Eve • Natasha Kaplinsky • The Kooks	28 March 2008
189	13	"Series 14, Episode 12"	David Tennant • Catherine Tate • Nigel Marven • John Hurt • Radiohead	4 April 2008
190	14	"Series 14, Episode 13"	Patsy Palmer • Mackenzie Crook • Ian Wright • Kirsty Gallacher • Nick Cave and the Bad Seeds	18 April 2008
191	15	"Series 14, Episode 14"	Ronnie Corbett • Russell Brand • Ashton Kutcher • The Courteeners	25 April 2008
192	16	"Series 14, Episode 15"	Robert Downey Jr. • Michael Aspel • Gwyneth Paltrow • The Ting Tings	2 May 2008
193	17	"Series 14, Episode 16"	Alan Sugar • Johnny Vegas • Jade Jagger • Vampire Weekend	9 May 2008
194	18	"Series 14, Episode 17"	Sarah Jessica Parker • Andrew Marr • Anthony Head • Yazoo	16 May 2008
195	19	"Series 14, Episode 18"	Ray Winstone • The Osmonds • Neil Diamond	23 May 2008
196	20	"Series 14, Episode 19"	John Barrowman • Kirsty Young • Mark Wahlberg • Andrew Lloyd Webber • Black Kids	30 May 2008
197	21	"Series 14, Episode 20"	Robbie Coltrane • Rachel de Thame • Andy Murray • Paul Weller	6 June 2008
198	22	"Series 14, Episode 21"	James McAvoy • Dame Eileen Atkins • Jo Brand • Coldplay	13 June 2008
199	23	"Series 14, Episode 22"	Sienna Miller • Danny Wallace • Joe Calzaghe • CSS	20 June 2008
200	24	"Series 14, Episode 23"	Charlotte Church • Will Smith • Jay-Z • James	27 June 2008
201	25	"Series 14, Episode 24"	Meryl Streep • Adrian Lester • Chris Addison • The Last Shadow Puppets	4 July 2008
202	26	"Series 14, Episode 25"	Chaka Khan • Gok Wan • Steve Carell • Primal Scream	11 July 2008

=== Series 15 (2008) ===
No. overall	No. in series	Title		Original release date
203	1	"Series 15, Episode 1"	Kelly Brook • Olympic Heroes • The Mighty Boosh • The Streets	5 September 2008
204	2	"Series 15, Episode 2"	Steve Coogan • Abbey Clancy • Stevie Wonder	12 September 2008
205	3	"Series 15, Episode 3"	Ben Stiller • Cheryl Cole • Paul O'Grady • Iglu & Hartly	19 September 2008
206	4	"Series 15, Episode 4"	Jamie Oliver • Simon Pegg • Matt Lucas • David Walliams • Keane	26 September 2008
207	5	"Series 15, Episode 5"	Faye Dunaway • Michael Parkinson • Alan Carr • Bishi	3 October 2008
208	6	"Series 15, Episode 6"	Colin Farrell • Claudia Winkleman • Roger Moore • The Kills	10 October 2008
209	7	"Series 15, Episode 7"	Gordon Ramsay • Sarah Silverman • Ricky Gervais • Razorlight	17 October 2008
210	8	"Series 15, Episode 8"	Daniel Craig • Grace Jones • Tony Curtis • Girls Aloud	24 October 2008

=== Series 16 (2009) ===
No. overall	No. in series	Title		Original release date
211	1	"Series 16, Episode 1"	Tom Cruise • Stephen Fry • Lee Evans • Franz Ferdinand	23 January 2009
212	2	"Series 16, Episode 2"	Glenn Close • William Shatner • Eddie Izzard • Lily Allen	30 January 2009
213	3	"Series 16, Episode 3"	Anna Friel • Benicio del Toro • Tom Jones	6 February 2009
214	4	"Series 16, Episode 4"	Michael McIntyre • Dev Patel • Emily Mortimer • Morrissey	13 February 2009
215	5	"Series 16, Episode 5"	Mickey Rourke • Jason Manford • Will Young • The Cure	20 February 2009
216	6	"Series 16, Episode 6"	David Attenborough • Emily Blunt • Clive Owen • U2	27 February 2009
217	7	"Series 16, Episode 7"	James Corden • Michael C. Hall • Ruby Wax • Annie Lennox	6 March 2009
218	8	"Series 16, Episode 8"	Michael Sheen • Lionel Richie • Vin Diesel • Sparks	20 March 2009
219	9	"Series 16, Episode 9"	Larry Lamb • Barbara Windsor • Chris Moyles • Rhys Ifans • Pete Doherty	27 March 2009
220	10	"Series 16, Episode 10"	Whoopi Goldberg • Jason Isaacs • Jason Donovan • Anohni and the Johnsons	3 April 2009
221	11	"Series 16, Episode 11"	Hugh Jackman • Martin Clunes • Lady Gaga	17 April 2009
222	12	"Series 16, Episode 12"	Spandau Ballet • Miley Cyrus • Helen Mirren • Simon Pegg	24 April 2009
223	13	"Series 16, Episode 13"	Rob Brydon • Sophie Dahl • Andrew Lloyd Webber • Jade Ewen • The Enemy	1 May 2009
224	14	"Series 16, Episode 14"	Tom Hanks • Coleen Nolan • Carol McGiffin • Jane McDonald • Dizzee Rascal	8 May 2009
225	15	"Series 16, Episode 15"	Ben Stiller • Ewan McGregor • Charlotte Uhlenbroek • Eminem	15 May 2009
226	16	"Series 16, Episode 16"	Martin Sheen • Yvette Fielding • Scott Maslen • Grace Jones	22 May 2009
227	17	"Series 16, Episode 17"	Joanna Lumley • The Priests • Brandon Flowers • The Killers	29 May 2009
228	18	"Series 16, Episode 18"	Dustin Hoffman • Hugh Laurie • Eric Cantona • Gossip	5 June 2009
229	19	"Series 16, Episode 19"	Sue Perkins • Giles Coren • Take That • Jack Black	12 June 2009
230	20	"Series 16, Episode 20"	David Mitchell • Robert Webb • Matthew Fox • Davina McCall • Reverend and the Makers	19 June 2009
231	21	"Series 16, Episode 21"	Blue • Florence and the Machine • Shappi Khorsandi • Tim Henman	26 June 2009
232	22	"Series 16, Episode 22"	Benny Andersson • Sandra Bullock • Emma Watson • Little Boots	3 July 2009
233	23	"Series 16, Episode 23"	Vivienne Westwood • Rufus Wainwright • James May • Paolo Nutini	10 July 2009
234	24	"Series 16, Episode 24"	Bono • The Edge • Anjelica Huston • Dame Edna Everage	17 July 2009
235	25	"Series 16, Episode 25"	Denzel Washington • Deborah Meaden • Theo Paphitis • James Caan • Peter Jones • Quentin Tarantino • a-ha	24 July 2009

=== Series 17 (2009) ===
No. overall	No. in series	Title		Original release date
236	1	"Series 17, Episode 1"	Stuart Broad • Ricky Gervais • Mika • Jamie Oliver	4 September 2009
237	2	"Series 17, Episode 2"	Barry Manilow • Alan Davies • Eva Mendes • Jamie T	11 September 2009
238	3	"Series 17, Episode 3"	Peter Andre • David Attenborough • Eva Herzigová • Eddie Izzard • Jay-Z	18 September 2009
239	4	"Series 17, Episode 4"	Graham Norton • Alexander Armstrong • Ben Miller • Verne Troyer • Shakira	25 September 2009
240	5	Series 17, Episode 5 (special)	Friday Night with Streisand and Ross — Barbra Streisand	2 October 2009
241	6	"Series 17, Episode 6"	Chris Evans • Jeremy Piven • JLS • Kasabian	9 October 2009
242	7	"Series 17, Episode 7"	Alesha Dixon • Vince Vaughn • Jack Dee • Paloma Faith	16 October 2009
243	8	"Series 17, Episode 8"	Boy George • Joanna Page • Tim Minchin • Jamie Cullum	23 October 2009
244	9	"Series 17, Episode 9"	Christopher Walken • Dara Ó Briain • Dominic Cooper • Green Day • The Stylistics	30 October 2009
245	10	"Series 17, Episode 10"	Jimmy Carr • Serena Williams • Robbie Williams	6 November 2009
246	11	"Series 17, Episode 11"	Michael McIntyre • Sarah Harding • Gerard Butler • David Haye • Arctic Monkeys	13 November 2009
247	12	"Series 17, Episode 12"	Jeremy Clarkson • Laurence Fishburne • Peter Kay • Muse	27 November 2009
248	13	"Series 17, Episode 13"	Reese Witherspoon • Gordon Ramsay • Russell Howard • Them Crooked Vultures	4 December 2009
249	14	"Series 17, Episode 14"	Jenson Button • Terry Wogan • Andre Agassi • N-Dubz	11 December 2009
250	15	"Series 17, Episode 15"	Eddie Izzard • Rihanna • Hugh Grant • The Priests	18 December 2009

=== Series 18 (2010) ===
No. overall	No. in series	Title		Original release date
251	1	"Series 18, Episode 1"	Ray Winstone • Arlene Phillips • Catherine Tate • Pixie Lott	15 January 2010
252	2	"Series 18, Episode 2"	Billie Piper • Alan Carr • Alicia Keys	22 January 2010
253	3	"Series 18, Episode 3"	Kim Cattrall • John & Edward • The cast of Misfits • Editors	29 January 2010
254	4	"Series 18, Episode 4"	Shahrukh Khan • John Barrowman • Lorraine Kelly • Marina Diamandis	5 February 2010
255	5	"Series 18, Episode 5"	Jeff Bridges • John Bishop • Westlife • Hole	12 February 2010
256	6	"Series 18, Episode 6"	Colin Farrell • Natalia Vodianova • Jason Manford • Jay-Z	19 February 2010
257	7	"Series 18, Episode 7"	Tim Burton • Andrew Lloyd Webber • Johnny Depp • Sade	26 February 2010
258	8	"Series 18, Episode 8"	Stephen Moyer • Lady Gaga • Michael Ball	5 March 2010
259	9	"Series 18, Episode 9"	Charlotte Church • James Corden • The cast of Outnumbered • Amy Williams • Plan B	12 March 2010
260	10	"Series 18, Episode 10"	Emma Thompson • Matt Smith • Brian Cox • Goldfrapp	26 March 2010
261	11	"Series 18, Episode 11"	Tina Fey • Heston Blumenthal • Aaron Johnson • Groove Armada feat. Will Young	2 April 2010
262	12	"Series 18, Episode 12"	Idris Elba • Kiefer Sutherland • Gemma Arterton • Alphabeat	16 April 2010
263	13	"Series 18, Episode 13"	Jeremy Clarkson • Louie Spence • Gwyneth Paltrow • Robert Downey Jr. • Demi Moore • Paul Weller	23 April 2010
264	14	"Series 18, Episode 14"	Russell Crowe • Reginald D. Hunter • David Gandy • Dizzee Rascal	30 April 2010
265	15	"Series 18, Episode 15"	Jake Gyllenhaal • Alan Sugar • Adam Lambert • The Drums	7 May 2010
266	16	"Series 18, Episode 16"	Nick Frost • Alexandra Burke • Warwick Davis • Ellie Goulding	14 May 2010
267	17	"Series 18, Episode 17"	Ross Noble • Mary Portas • Gary Lineker• Gorillaz • Tinie Tempah	21 May 2010
268	18	"Series 18, Episode 18"	Jeff Goldblum • Gabourey Sidibe • Kevin Bridges • Pendulum	28 May 2010
269	19	"Series 18, Episode 19"	Andy Roddick • LL Cool J • Nina Wadia, Nitin Ganatra • Eminem	4 June 2010
270	20	"Series 18, Episode 20"	Katherine Heigl • Frankie Boyle • Diddy	11 June 2010
271	21	"Series 18, Episode 21"	Al Green • Jools Holland • David Gilmour • Chris Colfer, Matthew Morrison, Amber Riley • Tom Hardy • Scissor Sisters	18 June 2010
272	22	"Series 18, Episode 22"	Sean Lock • Kylie Minogue • Seasick Steve	25 June 2010
273	23	"Series 18, Episode 23"	Robin Williams • Elle Macpherson • Tim Minchin • Mark Ronson	2 July 2010
274	24	"Series 18, Episode 24"	Jimmy Carr • Penn & Teller • Elliot Page • Tom Jones	9 July 2010
275	25	"Series 18, Episode 25"	David Beckham • Jackie Chan • Mickey Rourke • Roxy Music	16 July 2010
