= Patricia Shaw (novelist) =

Australian writer (1928–2024)

- Born: 26 May 1928; Melbourne, Victoria, Australia
- Died: 25 July 2024 (aged 96)
- Occupation: Novelist
- Writing career
- Notable awards: 2004 Corine Literature Prize – Readers' Choice Award, winner

Patricia Shaw (26 May 1928 – 25 July 2024) was an Australian novelist and non-fiction writer.

== Biography ==
Patricia Shaw was born in Melbourne, Victoria and spent her early years in Koo Wee Rup, a country town where her family owned a hotel. After marrying, she and her husband moved to Surfers Paradise, Queensland in the late 1950s. Her husband was in the Royal Australian Navy and was mostly absent; after having two children, they divorced.

For a number of years she was a member of the staff of Eric Robinson, member of parliament and a minister in the Fraser government. On his sudden death in 1981, she received a widow's pension, supplemented by freelance writing.

In 1983, she conducted interviews for the Oral History Department of the Parliamentary Library.

Shaw was 52 years old before she began to write fiction. Among her many novels, most of which centred on the settlement of the Australian hinterland and which earned her the sobriquet of "Australia's Chronicler", the most widely known are River of the Sun (1991) and The Opal Seekers (1996).

With a small amount of this money Patricia was able to buy herself a house at the Gold Coast, Queensland and begin writing. One of her books, The Glittering Fields, tells the story of this event and how it changed her life.

Much of Shaw's popularity and success came from overseas. Her books were extremely successful in Germany. She spent a considerable amount of time in Germany because of this and earned the nickname "The Frankfurt Poet". She also wrote two works of non-fiction regarding Australia's era of settlement.

Shaw was also actively involved in the protection of Australia's native animals and birds. She died on 25 July 2024, at the age of 96.

== Awards ==
2004 Corine Literature Prize (readers' choice award) for The Five Winds.

== Bibliography ==
=== Non-fiction ===
- Brother Digger (1984)
- Pioneers of a Trackless Land

=== Fiction ===
- Valley of Lagoons (1989)
- River of the Sun (1991)
- The Feather and the Stone (1992)
- Where the Willows Weep (1993, sequel to Valley of Lagoons)
- Cry of the Rainbird (1994)
- Fire Fortune (1995)
- The Opal Seekers (1996)
- Glittering Fields (1997)
- A Cross of Stars (1998)
- Orchid Bay (1999)
- Waiting for the Thunder (2000, the sequel to The Feather and the Stone)
- On Emerald Downs (2002)
- The Five Winds (2003, the sequel to Orchid Bay)
- Storm Bay (2005)
- Mango Hill (2007, the sequel to Where the Willows Weep)

== Sources ==
- Literaturschock.de short biography in German
- Corine.de regarding the Readers' Choice Award (in German)
