= Friday Night with Jonathan Ross =

Former British television chat show

- Genre: Chat show
- Written by: Jonathan Ross; Shaun Pye; Fraser Steele; Jim Pullin; Jez Stevenson
- Directed by: Mick Thomas (2002–2010); John L. Spencer (2004) (Other(s) unknown)
- Presented by: Jonathan Ross
- Starring: 4 Poofs and a Piano
- Country of origin: United Kingdom
- Original language: English
- No. of series: 18
- No. of episodes: 275 (list of episodes)

Production
- Executive producers: Addison Cresswell; Deborah Cox; Katie Taylor; Jonathan Ross; Mirella Breda; Suzanne Gilfillan; Karl Warner; Mark Linsey
- Producers: Seamus Murphy-Mitchell; Suzi Aplin
- Production location: BBC Television Centre
- Running time: 65 mins
- Production company: Hotsauce TV

Original release
- Network: BBC One
- Release: 2 November 2001 – 16 July 2010

Related
- The Jonathan Ross Show (2011–)

Friday Night with Jonathan Ross is a British chat show presented by Jonathan Ross and broadcast on BBC One between 2001 and 2010. The programme featured Ross's take on current topics of conversation, guest interviews (usually three per show) and live music from both a guest music group and the house band. First broadcast on 2 November 2001, the show began its final series in January 2010 and ended on 16 July 2010.

== History ==
From 2009 until the end, the programme was broadcast in high definition on BBC HD. Studio TC4 in the BBC Television Centre in London, where the show was made, was upgraded to HD, making it the third television studio in Television Centre to be upgraded to HD (the others being Studios TC1 and TC8).

The show was pulled by the BBC on 29 October 2008 when Ross and Russell Brand were both suspended from their TV and radio shows in the events after The Russell Brand Show prank telephone calls row. The show returned on 23 January 2009, attracting 5.1 million viewers. The final 275th episode was broadcast on 16 July 2010.

On 12 June 2009, the show began airing in the United States on BBC America at 8pm EST. In 2010, it also started airing on the UKTV channel in Australia, just weeks after the episodes were first aired in the UK.

In June 2010, it was announced that Ross would be moving to ITV to host a new Saturday night chat show, The Jonathan Ross Show, which started airing in September 2011.

The most frequent guests were Ricky Gervais and Jack Dee (eight episodes each), Eddie Izzard (seven episodes), and Jeremy Clarkson and Jimmy Carr (six episodes each). Johnny Vegas, David Attenborough, Stephen Fry, Damon Albarn and Simon Pegg all appeared in five episodes, and Robbie Williams appeared in four episodes.

== Format ==
The show was usually recorded in Studio TC4 at the BBC Television Centre in London. The house band, 4 Poofs and a Piano, provided musical backing. The show used to be recorded on Thursdays, but following his return from the Russell Brand incident, it was recorded on Tuesdays, leading to the show having much less topical humour. (Ross's Saturday morning Radio 2 show was also subjected to being recorded on Fridays after previously being live on Saturdays).

The house band consisted of Stephen de Martin, Ian Parkin, David Roper and David Wickenden. Each episode, they would wear identical T-shirts featuring the face of a guest at the centre. Every time a guest enters the studio, the band will perform a segment of a song, usually involving a reference to that particular guest. At the beginning of each show Jonathan Ross, would segue from his monologue with a homosexual innuendo about the group.

There have been a number of recurring themes on Friday Night. For instance, Ross often jokes about the age of veteran TV presenter Bruce Forsyth. This culminated in Forsyth appearing in the opening segment of the show broadcast on 30 November 2007, to supposedly take over as the show's presenter. Ross then appeared and called Tess Daly (Forsyth's co-host on Strictly Come Dancing) to supervise Forsyth safely out, again alluding to his age. Ross has also often made jokes about Heather Mills, the ex-wife of Paul McCartney. During a GMTV interview in October 2007, Mills complained about comments made by Ross. At the beginning of the show, between guests and during interviews Ross often recounted incidents involving his wife, children and pets. He also referred to items in the news and demonstrated amusing products. His guests were seen at the start of the show sitting in the green room and Ross preceded the introduction of each by asking the audience "Shall I get my first/next guest out?". While interviewing a guest he usually chatted with the other guests in the green room.

At the end of the show, there was a musical performance from a performer or a group. There were rare occasions where the performer(s) are interviewed as well as then going on to play their song or sometimes songs, notably all three original members of proto-punk legends The Stooges (Iggy Pop, Ron Asheton and Scott Asheton) were interviewed together on the show in June 2007 before performing "I Wanna Be Your Dog". American rock band The Killers performed on the show in May 2009. Lead vocalist Brandon Flowers previously had an interview with Ross before playing four songs with the band, the most that had ever been performed on the show with an interview until Robbie Williams performed 6 songs on 6 November 2009 after being interviewed.

== Host ==
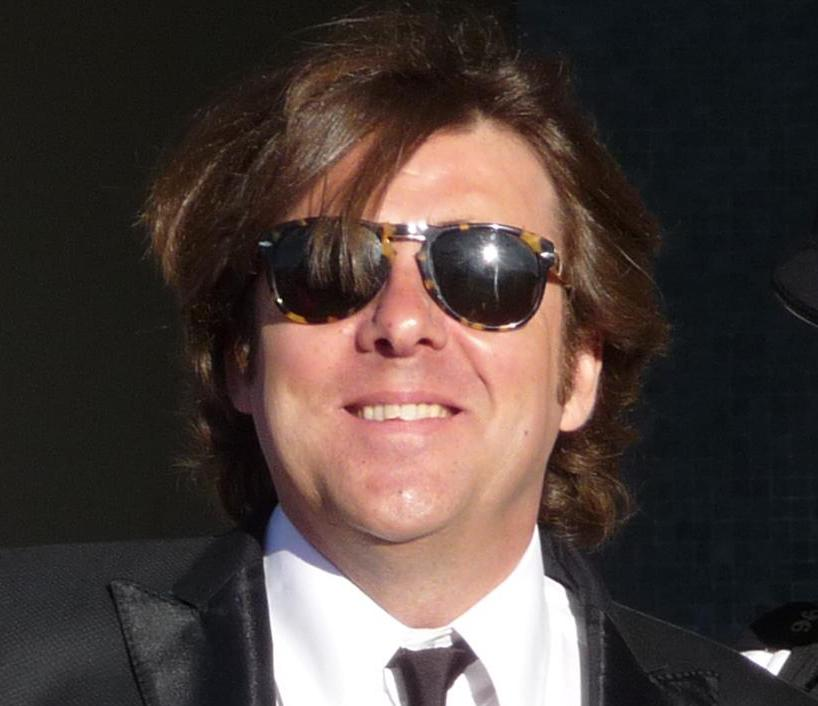
Jonathan Ross at the BAFTA Awards in 2009

Ross speaks with a rhotacism, causing him to pronounce the consonant 'r' like a 'w', which has led to the British tabloid newspapers dubbing him "Wossy". He is also known for his flamboyant dress sense and regularly wins awards for being the best and worst-dressed celebrity (when he appeared on the series Room 101, his own dress sense was one of the things he wished to banish). While appearing on They Think It's All Over, his dress sense was frequently mocked by the other panellists.

Ross was even blamed for a textile workers' strike in 1988. David Cope, a sales director for a dyeing operation, made the claim: "Ever since that trendy Jonathan Ross started wearing his big, baggy suits on television, he set a fashion that has been extremely lucrative for the British cotton industry and now the textile workers want a share of those profits."

Ross is also well known for his distinctive long hairstyle. Ross is known for owning exotic pets and is a big fan of David Bowie, Star Trek, Doctor Who, anime and comic books. Ross has even co-owned a comic shop in London with Paul Gambaccini. He was also the visual inspiration for the main character in the comic book Saviour.

== Episodes ==
There were 274 episodes that were recorded and have been shown, with the 18th series ending on 16 July 2010.

As well as various Christmas specials, there have also been a number of special editions with an episode devoted to a single guest. Friday Night with Ross and Bowie being the first, aired 5 July 2002, and featuring one of Ross's heroes, David Bowie. Followed by Friday Night with Ross and Madonna, aired 2 May 2003, and Friday Night with Ross and Parkinson aired on 14 March 2008, with fellow chat show host Michael Parkinson. Another, Friday Night with Streisand and Ross aired on 2 October 2009, with a world exclusive interview from actress Barbra Streisand. It was also the first time that she had performed on British television.

== Suspension ==
The show was suspended on 29 October 2008 by the BBC when Ross and Brand were both suspended from their TV and radio shows, in the events after The Russell Brand Show prank telephone calls row. Ross was later given an additional 12-week suspension, and released a statement, reading:

"I am deeply sorry and greatly regret the upset and distress that my juvenile and thoughtless remarks on the Russell Brand show have caused. I have not issued a statement previously because it was my intention and desire to offer an apology to all those offended on my Friday night programme. However, it was a stupid error of judgement on my part, and I offer a full apology." – Jonathan Ross's apology, taken from BBC News.

The comedy stand-up show Live at the Apollo was shown in the 22:35 Friday slot during Ross's absence. A new series of the popular comedy stand-up show was quickly commissioned to fill the slot, which featured films for four weeks after the suspension. Friday Night with Jonathan Ross returned on 23 January 2009. The show's return was watched by 5.1 million viewers, and received 25 complaints (protesting the show's return), and three messages of support for Ross.

== Awards ==
=== BAFTA TV Awards ===
- 2004 Best Entertainment Performance
- 2006 Best Entertainment Performance
- 2007 Best Entertainment Performance

=== British Comedy Awards ===
- 2003 Best Comedy Entertainment Programme

=== Royal Television Society Awards ===
- 2003 Best Entertainment Performance
- 2004 Best Entertainment Performance
