= Alex MacLean =

American photographer and architect

Alexander S. MacLean (born 1947) is an American photographic artist who is best known for his aerial photographs. His photographs have portrayed the history and evolution of the land from vast agricultural patterns to city grids, recording changes brought about by human intervention and natural processes.

MacLean graduated from Harvard College in 1969 with a Bachelor of Arts degree and earned a Master of Architecture degree from Harvard Graduate School of Design in 1973. He became interested in aerial scenery while he studied community planning and by 1975, MacLean received his commercial pilot license. Soon after, he established Landslides Aerial Photography to provide illustrative aerial photography for architects, landscape designers, urban planners, and environmentalists.

He is the author of ten books and has won many awards, including the 2009 Corine International Book Prize, the American Institute of Architects’ award for Excellence in International Architecture Book Publishing, and the American Academy of Rome’s Prix de Rome in Landscape Architecture for 2003–2004.

His photographs have been exhibited in the United States, Canada, Europe and Asia and are found in private, public and university collections.

MacLean flies a highly fuel-efficient carbon-fiber airplane out of Bedford, Massachusetts. He currently maintains a studio and lives in Lincoln, Massachusetts.

== Published books ==
- Up on the Roof: New York’s Hidden Skyline Spaces (2012)
- Chroniques Aeriennes: L’Art d’Alex MacLean (2010)
- Las Vegas | Venice (2010)
- OVER: The American Landscape at the Tipping Point (2008)
- The Playbook (2006)
- Taking Measures Across the American Landscape with James Corner (1996)
