= Crash Proof =

2007 book by Peter D. Schiff

Crash Proof: How to Profit From the Coming Economic Collapse
- Author: Peter Schiff
- Language: English
- Subject: Finance/Economics
- Genre: Non-fiction
- Publisher: Wiley
- Publication date: February 26, 2007 (1st edition)
- Publication place: United States
- Media type: Print (Hardback, Paperback)
- Pages: 288
- ISBN: 0-470-04360-1

Crash Proof: How to Profit From the Coming Economic Collapse is an investment book by American investment broker, Peter Schiff.

== Description ==
The book, published in 2007, just before the 2008 financial crisis predicted an imminent decline in the value of the American dollar and advised investment in foreign securities and precious metals. Following the recession of 2008, he published an updated version of the book called Crash Proof 2.0 which in January 2010 was listed on the New York Times best-seller list.
