= 4 Poofs and a Piano =

British comedy band

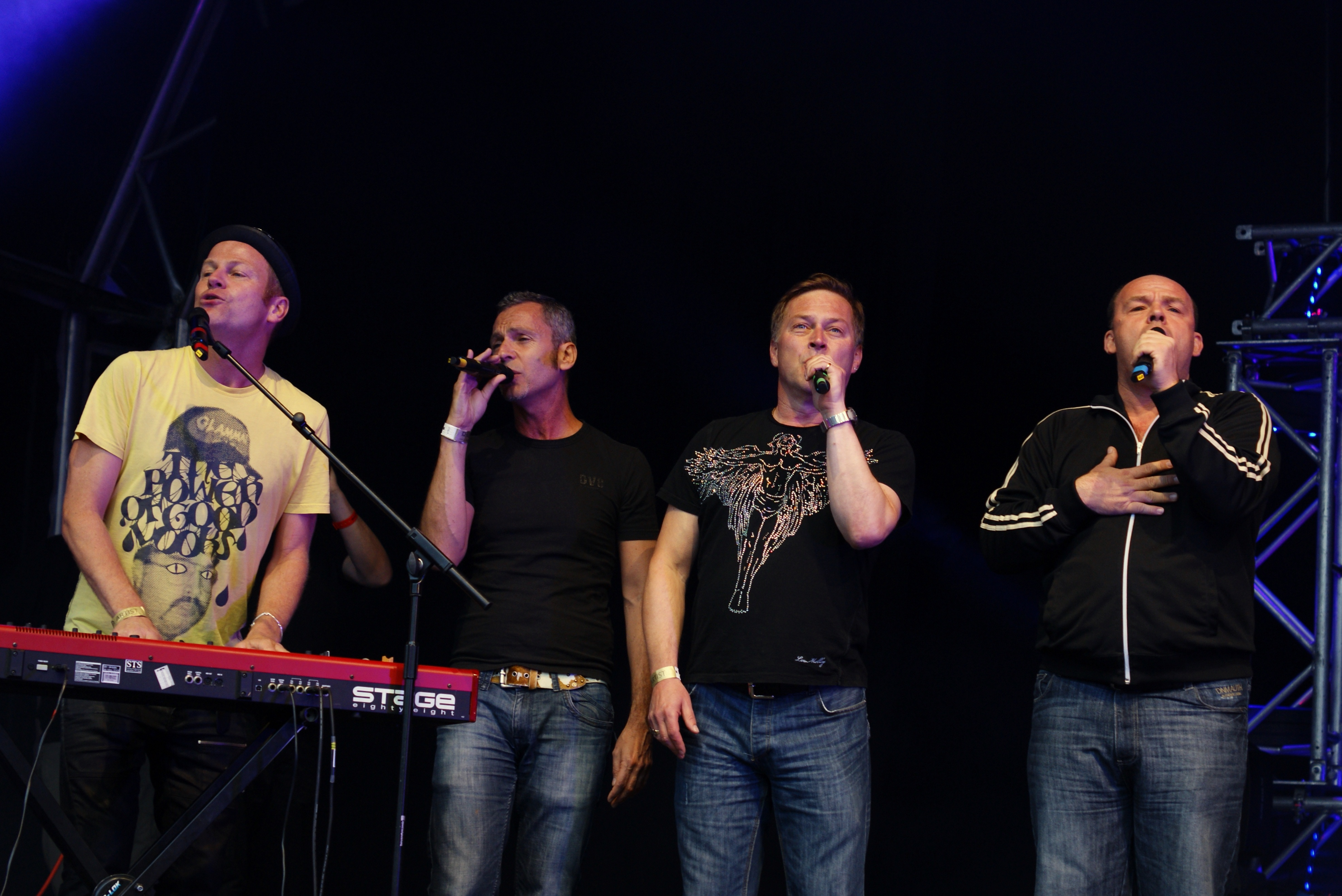
- 4 Poofs and a Piano performing in 2011

Background information
- Origin: United Kingdom
- Genres: Comedy band, pop
- Years active: 2000–present
- Members: Stephen De Martin; Ian Parkin; Duane Gooden; David Roper
- Website: Official website

4 Poofs and a Piano are a British comedy band formed in 2000. They were the house band on the BBC One chat show Friday Night with Jonathan Ross throughout the show's run from 2001 to 2010.

== History ==
The band performed their first gig at the Groucho Club. Since then, they have also performed at many corporate events, as well as Pride events and music festivals – including the Edinburgh Festival, Perth Festival, the Brighton Festival Fringe and Glastonbury Festival.

The band featured on Britain's Got More Talent, and appeared on The Alan Titchmarsh Show.

In 2009, the band featured in The Impressions Show with Culshaw and Stephenson, in a spoof Ross Kemp on Gangs episode, with Culshaw pretending to be Ross Kemp and Jonathan Ross.

== Friday Night with Jonathan Ross ==
Ross introduced the band each Friday night with an innuendo-laden joke directed at homosexuality, or the supposed sex lives of gay men. As each guest moved from the green room to the studio, the band played a cover version of a song related to the guest or their field of work. Their camp performance was often highly exaggerated in its stereotypical cabaret manner.

Each week a guest was singled out for special attention by the band who wore specially printed T-shirts featuring the guest's face. This was usually a privilege bestowed upon the guest most deemed a cult figure or gay icon.

In an October 2009 episode of the show with Tim Minchin as a guest, he performed a song called "5 Poofs and 2 Pianos", in which he humorously suggested he undergo reverse conversion therapy and join the quartet with his own piano.

== Band members ==
- Stephen De Martin – Vocals
- Ian Parkin – Vocals
- Duane Gooden – Vocals
- David Roper – Piano and vocals
