= Louise Welsh =

British fiction writer and dramatist, born 1965

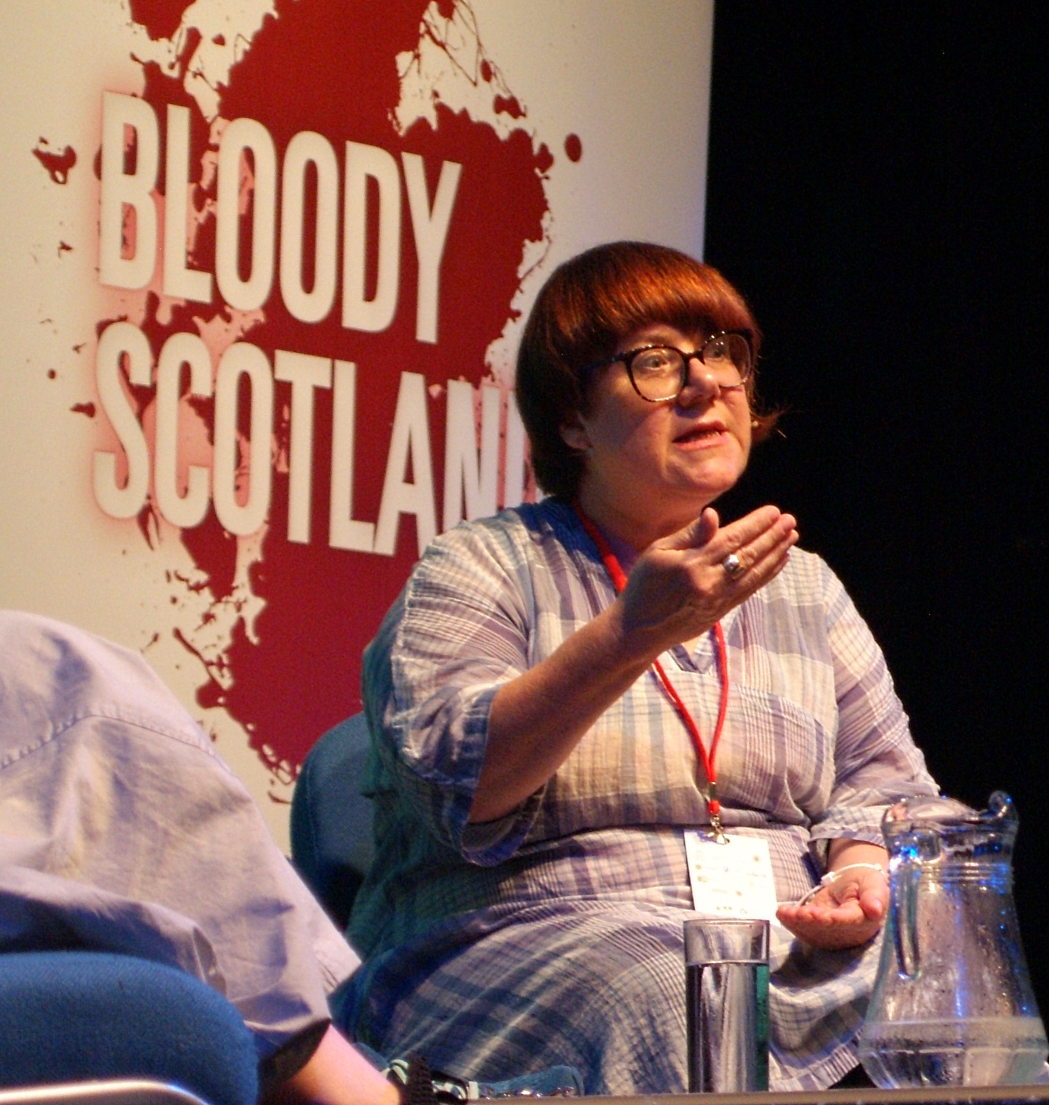
- Louise Welsh at Bloody Scotland 2019
- Born: 1 February 1965 (age 61); London, England
- Education: MA (Hons) in history, MLitt in Creative Writing (Distinction)
- Alma mater: University of Glasgow, University of Strathclyde
- Occupation: Writer
- Writing career
- Years active: 2002–present
- Genre: Psychological thrillers

Louise Welsh (born 1 February 1965 in London) is an English-born author of short stories and psychological thrillers, resident in Glasgow, Scotland. She has also written three plays, an opera, edited volumes of prose and poetry, and contributed to journals and anthologies. In 2004, she received the Corine Literature Prize.

== Education ==
Welsh studied history at Glasgow University and after graduating established and worked at a second-hand bookshop for several years before publishing her first novel.

== Career ==
Welsh's debut novel The Cutting Room (2002) was nominated for several literary awards including the 2003 Orange Prize for Fiction. It won the Crime Writers' Association Creasey Dagger for the best first crime novel. Welsh's second major work, the novella Tamburlaine Must Die (2004), fictionally recounts the last few days in the life of 16th-century English dramatist and poet Christopher Marlowe, author of Tamburlaine the Great. Her third novel, The Bullet Trick (2006), is set in Berlin, London and Glasgow and narrated from the perspective of magician and conjurer William Wilson. Her fourth novel, Naming the Bones, was published by Canongate Books in March 2010. Her fifth novel, The Girl on the Stairs is a psychological thriller set in Berlin and published in August 2012 by Hodder & Stoughton. Her sixth novel, A Lovely Way to Burn, came out with Hodder & Stoughton in 2014, and in 2015 a sequel, Death is a Welcome Guest was published.

In 2009, she donated the short story "The Night Highway" to Oxfam's Ox-Tales project, four collections of UK stories written by 38 authors. Her story was published in the Air collection.

From December 2010 to April 2012, she was the Writer in Residence for the University of Glasgow and Glasgow School of Art.

In 2011, Welsh participated in the International Writing Program Fall Residency at the University of Iowa, Iowa City, Iowa. She contributed, with Zoë Strachan, a short story entitled "Anyone Who Had a Heart" to Glasgow Women's Library's 21 Revolutions Project. 21 Revolutions commissioned 21 writers and 21 artists to create works to celebrate the 21st Birthday of Glasgow Women's Library. She is Honorary President of the Ullapool Book Festival. Welsh was elected a Fellow of the Royal Society of Literature in 2018.

In March 2026, Welsh was a guest on the Off the Shelf podcast.

== Personal life ==
Welsh lives in Glasgow with the writer Zoë Strachan, her partner since 1998.

== Bibliography ==
=== Novels ===
- The Cutting Room (2002)
- Tamburlaine Must Die (2004)
- The Bullet Trick (2006)
- Naming the Bones (2010)
- The Girl on the Stairs (2012)
- The Second Cut (2022)
- To the Dogs (2024)
- The Cut Up (2026)

==== Plague Times Trilogy ====
- A Lovely Way to Burn (2014)
- Death Is a Welcome Guest (2015)
- No Dominion (2017)

=== Short stories ===
- "The Night Highway" (2009)
- "Anyone Who Had a Heart" (2013)
