= How an Economy Grows and Why It Crashes =

2010 book by Peter Schiff

How an Economy Grows and Why it Crashes
- Author: Peter Schiff and Andrew Schiff
- Illustrator: Brendan Leach
- Language: English
- Subject: Finance/Economics
- Publisher: Wiley
- Publication date: May 3, 2010 (1st edition)
- Publication place: United States
- Media type: Print (Hardback)
- Pages: 256
- ISBN: 047052670X

How an Economy Grows and Why it Crashes (2010) is an illustrated book on various economic topics by Peter Schiff and Andrew Schiff. The book allegorically explores such topics as inflation, deficit spending, central banking, international trade, and the housing bubble and 2008 financial crisis. The Washington Times stated that the book "[conveys] the often intuitive ideas of economics through an engaging, fictitious story richly illustrated with amusing cartoons."

== Content ==
This book presents three important points of Austrian economics: First, the fundamental reason for promoting economic growth is production, not consumption; second, improving the deteriorating economic situation requires savings rather than consumption; third, the economy does not need inflation but rather deflation for prosperity.

== Award ==
The book was a 2010 winner of the getAbstract International Book Award, and a New York Times best-seller.

== Preceding book ==
The book was based on an earlier "economic comic book" by the authors' father Irwin Schiff, titled How an Economy Grows and Why it Doesn't.
