= The Extremists (play) =

2009 satirical play by C. J. Hopkins

- Original language: English
- Written by: C. J. Hopkins
- Genre: Political satire Dialogue theatre

Premiere
- Date: February 2009
- Place: English Theatre Berlin; Berlin, Germany
- Official website

The Extremists is a 2009 one-act play by C. J. Hopkins, published by Broadway Play Publishing. A political satire criticizing American views on extremism and foreign terrorism, it revolves around a television talk show host interviewing a counterterrorist expert on the imminent danger of the extremist threat. The play first premiered at the English Theatre Berlin, in Berlin, in February 2009, followed by a production at Seven Stages Theatre in Atlanta, Georgia, in March 2009.

== Plot summary ==
The audience is welcomed to "Issues in Focus," a political news and talk program based out of Washington, and are introduced to the show's host, self-described Washington insider Dick Hedgerow. Dick announces the entirety of the night's program will be devoted to an in-depth discussion on the threat of extremism and welcomes his guest; Norman "Norm" Krieger, a co-founder of the fictitious polling and counterterrorism organization, the Center of Advanced Strategic Studies. Norm has been invited on the show to discuss his newly published book, Extremism in the 21st Century, which focuses on the mindset of extremists and their psychological motivations, as well as how they're able to spread their beliefs globally. Norm explains that he believes extremism should be considered the final threat to a democratic world (albeit there are other, manageable threats that are easy to handle), and tells Dick that while the government should be constantly fighting back against this threat, it's important to keep the public placated, and allow them to carry on with their normal lives.

Norm further elaborates that as the threat of extremism is combated, the public's understanding of it will be skewed, and it will ultimately become too difficult to keep up with the narrative, and the majority of the details will be indiscernible. Dick insists that this isn't an issue, suggesting that they refrain from complete transparency with the American people, citing security concerns, and instead try and help them adjust the way they see things, which Norm claims were his motivations for writing his book. As their discussion continues, Dick inquires about a concrete definition of the word "extremism," which Norm initially struggles with; he eventually decides that extremism is primarily defined by violence, or advocating for its use. When Dick asks if this definition transcends political leanings, such as conservative or liberal views, Norm proposes that these labels have lost their meaning beyond the competition aspect, but later contradicts himself when he says it is absolutely necessary for America to maintain the two-party system, as a country with no ideological opposition would be undemocratic.

The interview then shifts gears as it begins to investigate the extremists' intentions, which Norm believes is not only to incite violence but to make people think, asking complicated and dangerous questions that will only lead to insanity. Instead of engaging in the destructive act of thinking, Norm insists that the viewers need to stick to the facts provided by those in power in the government and the media and unquestionably devote their minds to the programming that "freedom-loving people" such as himself are trying to ensure all of society conforms to. When Dick objects to this concept, claiming it is nothing better than the brainwashing that extremists are guilty of, Norm reassures him that this is brainwashing people with the truth, while the other option is to be brainwashed with "made-up extremist nonsense." As the play carries on, Dick and Norm constantly renege on their stances and their beliefs, and at its conclusion, they nearly break the fourth wall, seemingly aware that they are actors in an elaborate performance and are no less extremists than the terrorists they have warned the audience of.

== List of characters ==
- Norman Krieger – A poetic terrorist posing as an anti-terrorism expert.
- Dick Hedgerow – A poetic terrorist posing as a television journalist.
  - In some productions, Dick Hedgerow is renamed to Jane Woolwraith.

== Production history ==
The Extremists was first produced at the English Theatre Berlin, in February 2009, directed by Walter D. Asmus. It was followed by a production at Seven Stages Theatre, who co-produced the original showing, in Atlanta, Georgia, in March of the same year.

In 2010, a staged reading of the play was performed at the Schauspielhaus Bochum in Bochum, Germany, as well as the Acker Stadt Palast performing arts center in Berlin, 2012. A German translation of the play translated by Jasna Miletic was used for both productions.

Clancy Productions & Assembly produced the play at the 2013 Edinburgh Festival Fringe in Edinburgh, Scotland, with David Calvitto in the role of Norman Krieger, and Carol Scudder playing Jane Woolwraith, a female counterpart to the script's Dick Hedgerow.

A 2018 production was performed at Clark University in Worcester, Massachusetts, directed by Raymond Munro, with Jake Rosenthal as Norman Krieger, and Brett Iarrobino as Dick Hedgerow.

== Critical reception ==
Critics have praised the play for its complex and intricate text; a review of the 2013 Edinburgh Festival Fringe production describes Hopkins' script as a "fiendishly complex rollercoaster." Critics found the performances of Calvitto and Scudder dazzling, citing an incredible pace, and noting that audiences would leave the show questioning their understanding of western democracy.

Kolja Reichert of the German newspaper Der Tagesspiegel called the performance at the English Theatre Berlin "heady theater in the truest sense," and focused on the question of reality: "Hopkins builds a construct of ideas out of rhetoric until everything revolves around one thing - what is the truth for the good guys and what is it for the bad guys?" A review of the production in Die Tageszeitung claimed the play was an excellent example of the advantages theater holds over film, in that it lays bare the mechanisms of the media.
