= Peter Schiff =

American stock broker, radio personality, and author (born 1963)

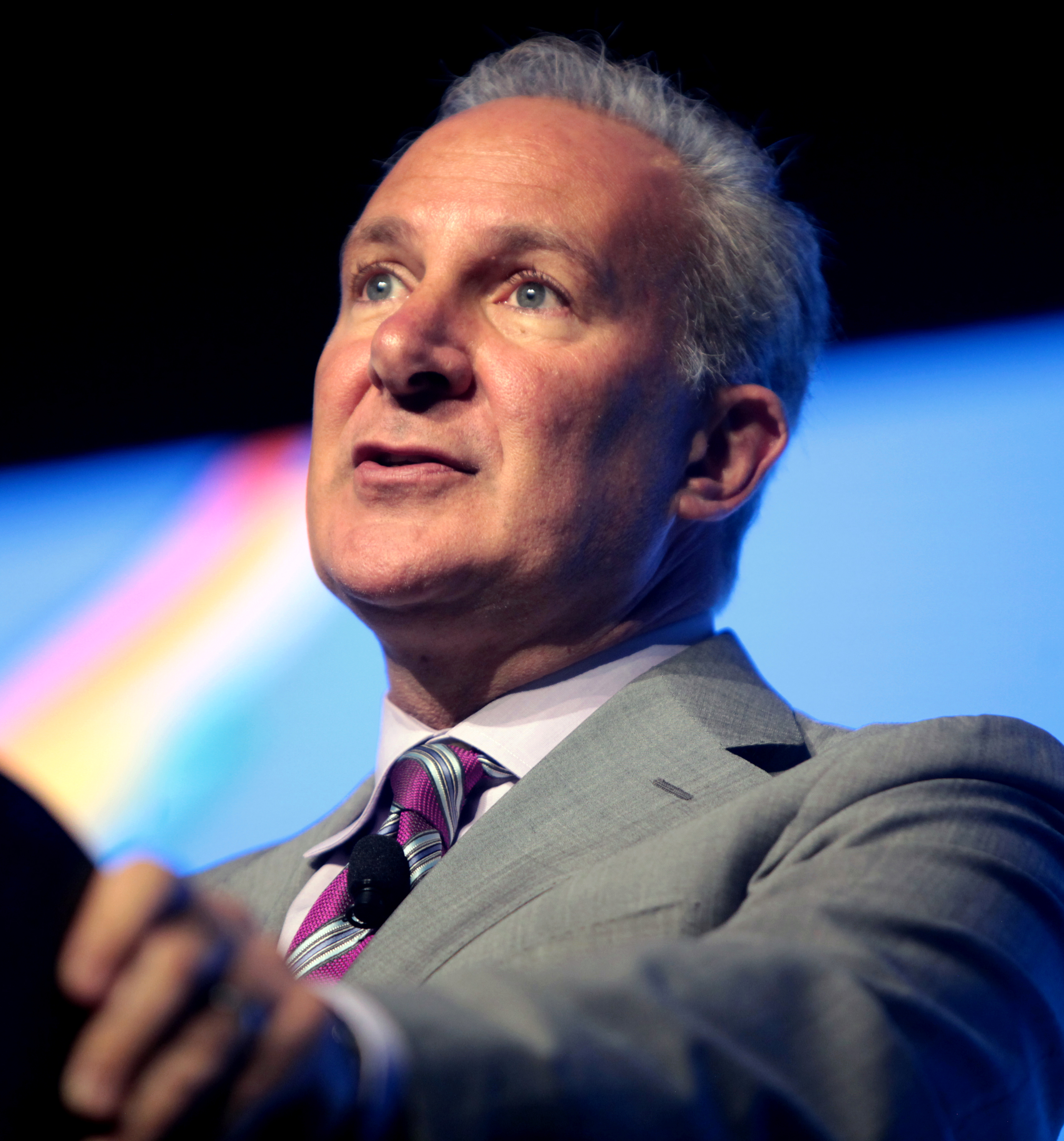
- Schiff in 2016
- Born: Peter David Schiff; March 23, 1963 (age 63); New Haven, Connecticut, U.S.
- Education: University of California, Berkeley (BS)
- Occupations: Stock broker, financial commentator, radio personality, author
- Spouse: Lauren Schiff
- Children: 3
- Parent: Irwin Schiff (father)
- Writing career
- Subjects: Business; Investing; Economics; Personal finance
- Website: schiffradio.com

Peter David Schiff (/ʃɪf/; born March 23, 1963; nicknamed "Dr. Doom") is an American stockbroker, financial commentator, and radio personality. He co-founded Echelon Wealth Partners in Canada (formerly Euro Pacific Canada). He is involved in other financial services companies including Euro Pacific Asset Management, as an independent investment advisor, and Schiff Gold (formerly Euro Pacific Precious Metals). He has criticized US banking and credit practices.

== Personal life ==
Schiff was born to a middle-class Jewish family in New Haven, Connecticut. His father, Irwin Schiff, was the son of Jewish immigrants from Poland. Schiff's parents divorced when he was young and he moved around the country with his mother and his brother, Andrew, from Connecticut to Manhattan to Florida and finally to Southern California. Peter Schiff credits his father for introducing him to the Austrian School of economic thought.

Irwin Schiff was a prominent figure in the US tax protester movement. He died in federal prison in October 2015 while he was serving a sentence of at least 13 years for tax evasion. Peter Schiff did not share his father's radical stance and by 1980, had urged him to stop his tax protest activities which he saw as "futile resistance". He later stated that while he had come to find his father's intellectual case "compelling", he was disinclined to follow his methods and his "idealism". Schiff commented, "The problem with my father is that he's not practical. He was always going to lose." On October 20, 2015, four days after the death of his father, Schiff accused the Federal Bureau of Prisons of inhumanely treating his father and not allowing the usual humanitarian release.

== Business career ==
Schiff began his career as a stockbroker at a Shearson Lehman Brothers brokerage in the early 1990s.

In 1996, Schiff and a partner acquired an inactive brokerage firm and renamed it Euro Pacific Capital, and began operating it from a small office in Los Angeles. They relocated the firm to Darien, Connecticut, in 2005, and later to Westport, Connecticut, where it is currently headquartered with branch offices across the US in Scottsdale, Arizona; Boca Raton, Florida; Newport Beach and Manhattan Beach, California; and New York City. Schiff sold Euro Pacific Capital, which is now called Alliance Global Partners.

Schiff founded Euro Pacific Bank, a full reserve banking operation originally in St. Vincent and the Grenadines.

=== Investigation and lawsuit ===
On June 30, 2022, the Puerto Rico Office of the Commissioner of Financial Institutions (OCIF) announced they had suspended the operations of Schiff's Puerto Rico-based Euro Pacific International Bank, which was suspected of having facilitated money laundering and tax evasion. The Commissioner stated that it had found numerous violations of its regulations and that the bank had "not wanted to comply". Regulators liquidated the bank, and Schiff paid $300,000 in fines.

Schiff claimed that the OCIF actions were due to allegations made by 60 Minutes Australia and The Age newspaper, saying, "There was no way those allegations were true, but once those stories broke, the bank's business imploded." In 2022 Schiff filed a civil action against the Nine Network and The Age newspaper for defamation over the 60 Minutes Australia interview and subsequent Age articles. Later in 2022, an Australian judge ruled that 60 Minutes had defamed Schiff but The Age had not.

By December 2023, the civil action was settled. Schiff was paid $360,000, and the respondents removed all versions of the 60 Minutes broadcast.

Schiff has stated that he lost millions of dollars due to the investigation.

In August 2024, Schiff filed a lawsuit against the Internal Revenue Service (IRS) on claims that it failed to fulfill a Freedom of Information Act (FOIA) request to provide information regarding its suspension of Euro Pacific Bank's operations.

== Economic and public policy views ==
=== 2008 financial crisis ===
In an August 2006 interview, Schiff said, "The United States is like the Titanic and I am here with the lifeboat trying to get people to leave the ship.... I see a real financial crisis coming for the United States." On December 31, 2006, in a telecast debate on Fox News, Schiff forecast that "what's going to happen in 2007 is that real estate prices," which had peaked in December 2005, "are going to come crashing back down to Earth."

In his 2007 book Crash Proof, Schiff wrote that US economic policies were fundamentally unsound. Since then he has said many times that without a change in US government economic policy, there will be hyperinflation and that the imbalance between the number of goods the US consumed and what it produced would eventually lead to problems for the US economy. As a remedy, he favored increased personal savings and production to stimulate economic growth. Schiff cited the US's low personal savings rate as one of the causes of its transformation from the world's largest creditor nation in the 1970s to the largest debtor nation in 2000. He attributed the low savings rate to what he asserts are high inflation and artificially low interest rates set by the Federal Reserve.

In 2008 and 2010 appearances on Fox News and financial news network CNBC, Schiff mentioned factors such as speculation and "the absence of lending standards" as factors that had contributed to the housing crisis, which began in 2007.

On December 13, 2007, in an interview on the Bloomberg TV show Open Exchange, Schiff added that he felt that the crisis would extend to the credit card lending industry, and he called consumer credit "a cancer on the free-market economy". Schiff said that interest rates would rise, that the dollar would "collapse", and that all classes of dollar-denominated assets would fall in value relative to non-US assets. He predicted "a huge crisis" and "the blow-up of credit card finance" in 2008, with the result that consumer credit card spending limits would be "slashed" by card issuers. He added that Americans would no longer be able to make purchases using their credit card lines. This prediction went unrealized. Referring to the housing market, Schiff went on to criticize the policy of the Bush administration to "vilify and threaten the lenders" for reckless borrowing.

In a March 2009 speech, Schiff said that it would be impossible for the US public debt to China to be repaid unless the US dollar's value is substantially diluted through inflation. In September 2009, with gold below $1,000 per ounce, Schiff said that he foresaw gold at over $5,000 per ounce in the future, and that the stock market rally which began that year was a "rally in a bear market".

=== Taxation ===
In March 2011, Schiff stated that a national sales tax should replace both personal and corporate income taxes, as he believes that the latter discourages work as opposed to a consumption tax. His second choice is a flat tax rate, which would abolish all deductions including the very popular home mortgage tax deduction, as he believes that the state should not subsidize buying homes as opposed to renting.

=== Medicare ===
In August 2012, Schiff criticized Paul Ryan's Path to Prosperity by saying that it was "too little, too late". Referring to Ryan's plan to reform Medicare, Schiff said, "Why would we want to preserve it? It's a Ponzi scheme... What we really need is real Medicare cuts today for people who are already on the system."

=== Bitcoin ===
Schiff is a vocal Bitcoin sceptic. At times he has remarked that he sees Bitcoin as resembling the tulip mania bubble.

On January 19, 2020, Schiff claimed that his Bitcoin wallet got 'corrupted' and that he had therefore lost all the bitcoin he ever owned, through no fault of his own. "My wallet got corrupted somehow and my password is no longer valid. So now not only is my Bitcoin intrinsically worthless; it has no market value either. I knew owning Bitcoin was a bad idea, I just never realized it was this bad." This claim was said to be false as later explained by Erik Voorhees, as he confirmed that he had, indeed, helped Schiff to set up his Bitcoin wallet, and wrote that Schiff "forgot (the) pw, and never recorded (his recovery) phrase". "If I gave him an ounce of gold and he dropped it on the sidewalk would he similarly condemn the precious metal as a foolish monetary system?"

=== Responses ===
Schiff's warnings of a coming economic collapse earned him the moniker "Dr. Doom". A YouTube fan video, "Peter Schiff was right", became popular in late 2008 and 2009. It contained a compilation of his appearances on various financial TV news programs between 2005 and 2007.

Depending on the point at which they adopted his strategies, followers of Schiff may have had strong, average or poor returns. In January 2009, economic blogger and investment adviser Michael Shedlock wrote, "I have talked with many who claim they have invested with Schiff and are down anywhere from 40% to 70% in 2008." Later that week, an article appeared in The Wall Street Journal reporting that Schiff's broker-dealer firm had "advised its clients to bet that the dollar would weaken significantly and that foreign stocks would outpace their U.S. peers" but the dollar later advanced against most currencies, "magnifying the losses from foreign stocks." In response to Shedlock's criticism, Schiff wrote that "to examine the effectiveness of my investment strategy immediately following a major correction by looking only at those accounts who adopted the strategy at the previous peak is unfair and distortive." In December 2012 Schiff wrote an article entitled "Mish Shedlock exposed" in which he criticized Shedlock for selective use of short-term data in the 2008 financial crisis and argued that his investment strategy had made strong returns over the long run.

Schiff's views have been criticized several times by economist Paul Krugman, who defines inflation very differently from Schiff, focusing on CPI increases rather than monetary and asset price inflation. Schiff believes inflation eventually leads to increases in consumer prices after an indefinite waiting period. In October 2010, Krugman wrote, "I keep being told that Peter Schiff has been right about everything; so, how's that hyperinflation thing going?" In December 2011, Krugman quoted Peter Schiff's statement from December 2009: "I know inflation is going to get worse in 2010. Whether it's going to run out of control or it's going to take until 2011 or 2012, but I know we're going to have a major currency crisis coming soon. It's going to dwarf the financial crisis and it's going to send consumer prices absolutely ballistic, as well as interest rates and unemployment." Krugman noted that inflation had instead remained low and concluded that Schiff's type of economic "model is all wrong" since it predicts that a tripling of the monetary base, such as had just occurred, must lead to "dire effects on the price level".

In January 2012, Schiff stated that a US debt crisis and high consumer price inflation had been delayed merely by government policy. In November 2012 and again in November 2014, Krugman repeated his criticisms of Schiff's predictions of eventual high consumer price inflation and rising interest rates in America.

In November 2008, Schiff said he supported the reduction of government economic regulation and was concerned that the Obama administration might instead increase such regulation. He said that the Great Recession provided an opportunity to transition from borrowing and spending to saving and producing. He was critical of the US government's efforts to "ease the pain" with economic stimulus packages and bailout, as he believed that replacing "legitimate savings with a printing press" would result in asset price inflation, eventual consumer price inflation, and if left unchecked potentially hyperinflation.

For example, in 2009, Schiff predicted a "protracted period of economic decline accompanied by rapid increases in consumer prices". Schiff's critics pointed out that although asset price inflation has been significant, consumer price inflation rates remained very low in the five years that followed despite his predictions.

When the Fed ended the quantitative easing program in October 2014, the general opinion was the Fed would conduct multiple rate hikes in the year 2015. In contrast, Schiff predicted that the market could not withstand even a minor interest rate increase, thus the Fed announcing a higher rate would be very unlikely. However, he did open up the possibility of a few basis point rate hike but anticipated that it would have major impact on the equity market and would lead the US into recession, therefore the Fed would be forced to reverse its policy and resume the QE program.

== Political career ==
=== 2008 Ron Paul presidential campaign ===
Schiff was an economic adviser to Ron Paul's 2008 presidential campaign.

=== 2010 US Senate campaign ===
In December 2008, some Connecticut citizens created a website encouraging Schiff to campaign against incumbent senator Christopher Dodd. Approximately 5,000 people made campaign contributions using the website. On February 21, 2009, a moneybomb raised over $20,000 for Schiff's campaign.

In a May 2009 video blog, Schiff said that he was seriously considering a run for the US Senate, and when questioned by a Washington Post reporter, he said the chance of him entering politics was "better than 50-50". In June 2009, Schiff commissioned a poll of likely voters which indicated that he trailed Dodd in popularity by only four percentage points. On July 9, 2009, Schiff launched an exploratory committee and an official campaign website.

After giving some hints he would run on The Daily Show, Schiff officially announced his candidacy for the Republican nomination on September 17, 2009, during the MSNBC Morning Joe show. By October 2009, Schiff had received more than 10,000 donations and many e-mails from around the world. Schiff's campaign received endorsements from Ron Paul and Steve Forbes.

At the May 2010 Republican convention, Linda McMahon received the most delegate votes but not enough to prevent an August primary election challenge from Rob Simmons. Schiff failed to qualify for the primary at the convention but became the only Republican candidate to successfully petition to be placed on the ballot. McMahon won the primary with 49% of the vote. Simmons came in second with 28% of the vote, and Schiff came in third with 23% of the vote.

The general election was won by the Democratic Party primary winner, Richard Blumenthal.

=== Other endorsements ===
In April 2008, Schiff endorsed Murray Sabrin for the U.S. Senate seat in New Jersey.

Schiff did not endorse McMahon in the 2012 Republican primary but rather her opponent, former representative Christopher Shays. Shays lost in the primary to McMahon, who lost in the general election to Democrat Chris Murphy.

On July 18, 2025, Schiff denounced Elon Musk and his proposed America Party arguing that Musk's attempt to find a "middle ground" between the Republicans and Democrats is a fools errand.

== Media career ==
=== Radio ===
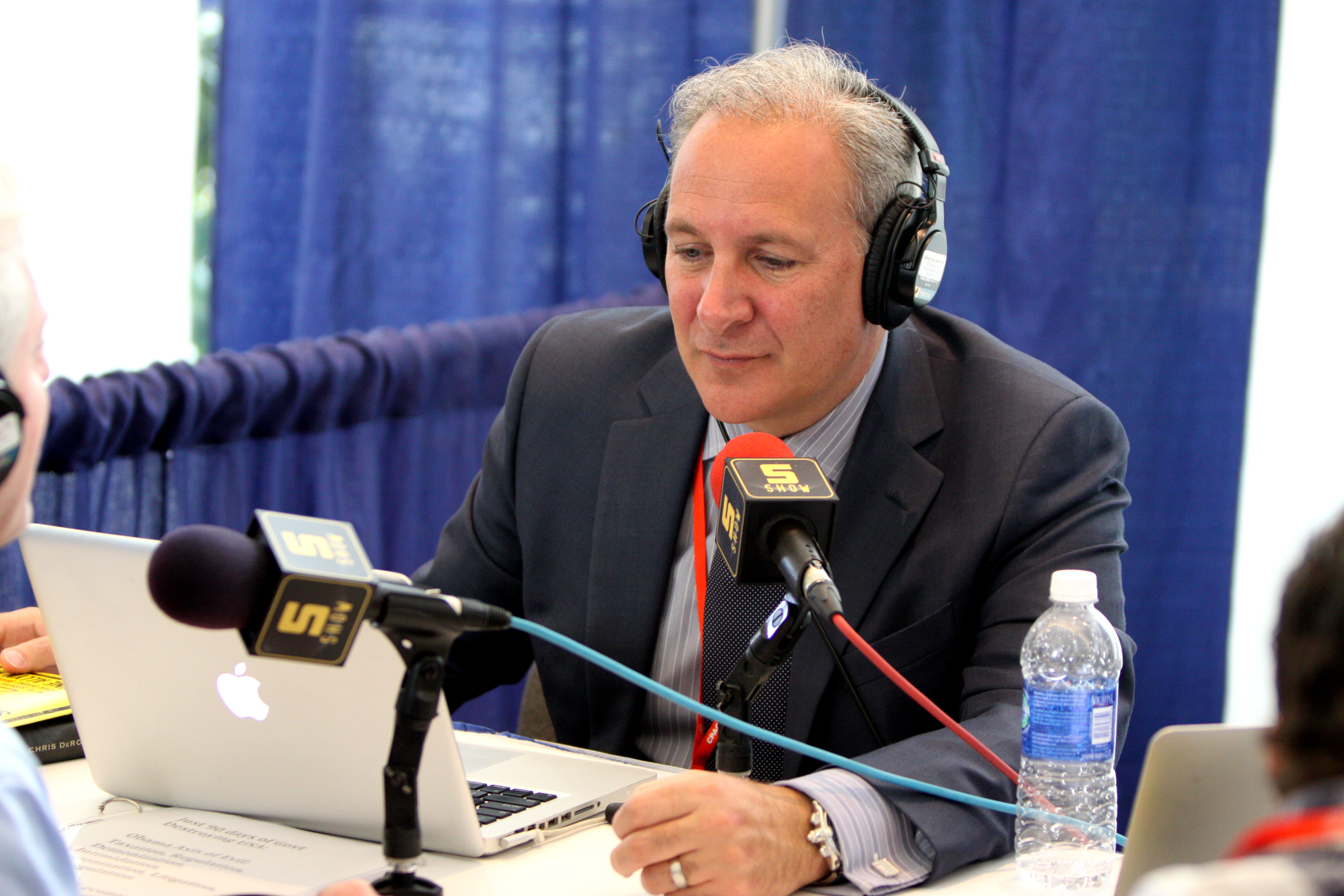
Schiff broadcasting his radio show from Washington, D.C. in March 2013

Before the 2008 financial crisis, Schiff frequently appeared on CNBC, Fox News and Bloomberg News to voice his opinions on the US economy and financial markets. However, after the financial crisis, his bookings dropped by 75 to 85% on these networks.

In August 2012, Schiff replaced G. Gordon Liddy in the 10 a.m.–12 p.m. time slot on the Radio America network Internet broadcast.

=== Webcast ===
Schiff is also a video blogger on the internet and distributes his media through YouTube, Euro Pacific Capital, and iTunes. He has appeared four times as a guest on Joe Rogan's YouTube series and podcast The Joe Rogan Experience.

=== Television ===
Schiff has been a commentator on CNBC and Fox Business.

== Books ==
- Crash Proof: How to Profit From the Coming Economic Collapse, 2007, ISBN 978-0-470-04360-8
- The Little Book of Bull Moves in Bear Markets: How to Keep your Portfolio Up When the Market is Down, 2008, ISBN 978-0-470-38378-0
- Crash Proof 2.0: How to Profit From the Economic Collapse, 2nd Edition, 2009, ISBN 978-0-470-47453-2
- The Little Book of Bull Moves, Updated and Expanded: How to Keep Your Portfolio Up When the Market Is Up, Down, Or Sideways, 2010, ISBN 0-470-64399-4 澳门威尼斯人官网开户
- How an Economy Grows and Why It Crashes, 2010, ISBN 978-0-470-52670-5 How an Economy Grows and Why It Crashes | Wiley
- The Real Crash: America's Coming Bankruptcy – How to Save Yourself and Your Country, 2012, ISBN 978-1-250-00447-5 Book details
