= The Cutting Room (novel) =

2002 novel by Louise Welsh

- First edition
- Author: Louise Welsh
- Language: English
- Genre: Crime/Literary fiction
- Publisher: Canongate (UK)
- Publication date: 2002
- Publication place: Scotland
- Media type: Print (hardcover and paperback)
- Pages: 293 (paperback)
- ISBN: 1-84195-404-7
- OCLC: 51781600
- Followed by: Tamburlaine Must Die

The Cutting Room is the debut novel of Scottish author Louise Welsh. The book was first published in 2002 by Edinburgh-based publisher Canongate. It has won several awards including the 2002 Saltire Society First Book Award. In 2022, Welsh published a sequel novel, The Second Cut, which takes place two decades after the events of The Cutting Room.

== Plot summary ==
The novel, set in Glasgow, revolves around the central character, Rilke, an auctioneer who has agreed to quickly process and sell an inventory of largely valuable contents belonging to a recently deceased old man in exchange for a considerable fee. While sorting through some of the possessions in an attic, he comes across a collection of violent and potentially snuff pornography that appears to document the death of a mysterious young woman.

Starting with local pornography trade contacts, Rilke sets out to discover this woman's identity and uncover the story behind her appearance in the disturbing photographs.

== Critical reception ==
The novel received a highly positive reception from critics. The Guardian described it as a "gleefully black, knowing first novel", also noting that it "effortlessly glides [from a detective novel] into literary fiction". For The Independent, the novel presented a "hugely commendable debut, assured and memorable" and "a genuinely creepy, grisly little tale".

The Sunday Times described The Cutting Room as: "one of the most intriguing, assured and unputdownable debuts to come out of Scotland in recent years". The List was particularly impressed by Welsh's portrayal of Glasgow: "...the city becomes a character in its own right; Gothic, dismal, decaying and frightening in equal measure".

The novel won several awards, including the Saltire Society First Book Award 2002, the Crime Writers’ Association John Creasey Memorial Dagger Award 2002 and the BBC Underground Award 2003. It was a 2004 Stonewall Honor Book in Literature.

== Adaptations ==
The novel was adapted for the stage a year after publication, the world premiere taking place in the Citizens Theatre in Glasgow in October 2003.

Plans to produce a film version of the novel were at an advanced stage in 2004. The film was set to star Robert Carlyle as Rilke with a screenplay from Andrea Gibb, and was due to be filmed on location in the West End of Glasgow, but the project failed to materialise. Carlyle did, however, contribute to an audiobook version of the novel in 2006.
