= Bordercrossing Berlin =

German literary journal

Bordercrossing Berlin was a literary journal founded in 2006 and based in Berlin, Germany. The magazine was published biannually. The second issue was published by The Blackbird Press. It ceased publication after three issues.

It featured prose and poetry by authors writing in English but living in non-English speaking countries. While trans-localism was occasionally reflected in the stories and poems, it was not a required theme, as many authors living abroad use their time in other countries to reflect back on their homelands, or simply as a sort of writer's retreat. The journal was started by chief editor, Fiona Mizani and Johannes Frank, publisher of the German language literary magazine "Belletristik". Fiona Mizani ran a spoken word series out of Café Rosa in Berlin. While the café no longer exists, it enjoyed a reputation as a meeting place for English-speaking travellers and ex-pats, and especially for budding authors.

Bordercrossing Berlin ceased publication in 2008.
