= List of Play to the Whistle episodes =

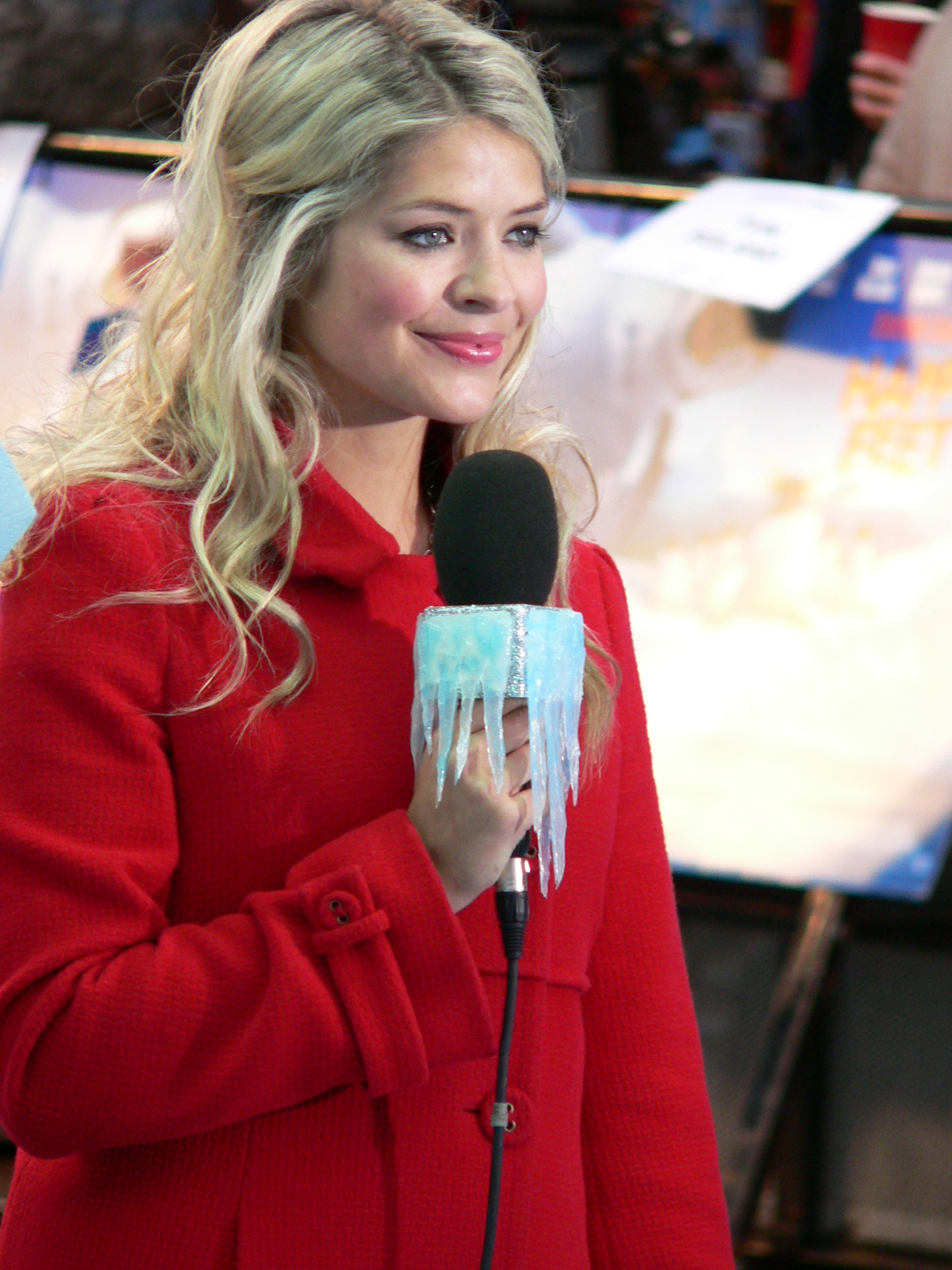
Play to the Whistle is presented by Holly Willoughby.

Play to the Whistle is a British comedy panel game television programme which premiered on ITV on 11 April 2015 and is produced by Hungry Bear Media. In each regular episode two teams of three members – one member being a regular captain – compete in sports knowledge rounds and physical games to earn points, the team with the most points at the end is declared the winner. The show is presented by Holly Willoughby and the teams are captained by Bradley Walsh and Frank Lampard; with Romesh Ranganathan being a regular panelist on Lampard's team. Seann Walsh is the resident scorekeeper and also became the host's assistant from the second series. Jimmy Bullard was the host's assistant in the first series. Nineteen regular episodes and a compilation special aired across three series. Willoughby promoted the third and final series as a guest on The One Show on 27 February 2017.

== Series overview ==
Series	Episodes	Originally released		Series ratings (in millions)
Series	Episodes	First released	Last released	Series ratings (in millions)
1	8	11 April 2015	6 June 2015	2.53
2	7	16 April 2016	28 May 2016	2.66
3	6	28 February 2017	4 April 2017	1.60

== Key ==
- The background colours indicate the result of the episode
  - – indicates Walsh's team won
  - – indicates Lampard and Ranganathan's team won
  - – indicates the game ended in a draw
- A score in red (−n) indicates negative score

== Episodes ==
=== Series 1 (2015) ===
No. overall	No. in series	Bradley's guests	Frank and Romesh's guests	Score	Original release date	Viewers (millions)
1	1	Rob Beckett; Peter Crouch	Paddy McGuinness	8–7	11 April 2015	2.92
2	2	Sean Lock; Alex Scott	Graeme Swann	8–10	18 April 2015	3.24
3	3	Alex Brooker; Piers Morgan	Harry Redknapp	8–9	25 April 2015	3.13
4	4	Christine Bleakley; Alex Oxlade-Chamberlain	Dermot O'Leary	7–5	2 May 2015	2.59
5	5	Carl Fogarty; Jon Richardson	Niall Horan	8–8	9 May 2015	2.95
6	6	Jonathan Ross; Brooke Vincent	Tony McCoy	−3–9	16 May 2015	2.70
7	7	Natalie Anderson; Bob Mortimer	Pat Cash	8–8	23 May 2015	1.83
8	8	Compilation episode – "Extra Time"	Compilation episode – "Extra Time"	N/A	6 June 2015	0.87

=== Series 2 (2016) ===
No. overall	No. in series	Bradley's guests	Frank and Romesh's guests	Score	Original release date	Viewers (millions)
9	1	Rob Beckett; Tom Daley	Richard Osman	6–9	16 April 2016	3.44
10	2	Anthony Joshua; Jon Richardson	Kevin Bridges	6–5	23 April 2016	3.36
11	3	Chris Kamara; Jack P. Shepherd	Jonathan Ross	7–5	30 April 2016	2.20
12	4	Wilfried Zaha; Funmbi Omotayo	Rochelle Humes	3–8	7 May 2016	2.58
13	5	Peter Jones; Sara Pascoe	David Haye	6–7	14 May 2016	2.04
14	6	Danny Cipriani; Katherine Ryan	Piers Morgan	6–4	21 May 2016	2.34

=== Series 3 (2017) ===
No. overall	No. in series	Bradley's guests	Frank and Romesh's guests	Score	Original release date	Viewers (millions)
15	1	John Terry; Rachel Riley	Jonnie Peacock	N/A (Note: The scores were not revealed at the end of the episode.)	28 February 2017	1.98
16	2	Jimmy Carr; Alan Shearer	James Anderson	8–8 (Note: As a tiebreaker the teams participated in a football penalty shoot-out against former England international goalkeeper David Seaman. Lampard's team won the shoot-out 2–1.)	7 March 2017	1.57
17	3	Samantha Quek; Rob Beckett	Jake Humphrey	9–5	14 March 2017	1.47
18	4	Kevin Bridges; Ashley Cole	Ore Oduba	9–6	21 March 2017	1.43
19	5	Joel Dommett; Judy Murray	Michail Antonio	7–9	28 March 2017	1.57
20	6	Rob Beckett; Andrew Johnston	Scarlett Moffatt	9–7	4 April 2017	1.58

== Scores ==
Bradley	Frank and Romesh
Series wins (2 drawn)
0	1
Episode wins (2 drawn)
8	9
