= NFL on 5 =

- Also known as: NFL Big Game Night
- Presented by: Dermot O'Leary
- Starring: Sam Quek; Osi Umenyiora; Alex Gray; Milo McCabe
- Country of origin: United Kingdom
- Original language: English

Production
- Production locations: Hammersmith, London Super Bowl: On location
- Running time: 210 Minutes or until game ends
- Production company: Hungry Bear Media

Original release
- Network: 5; 5Action
- Release: 7 September 2025 – present

NFL on 5 is a presentation of the National Football League broadcast by British television channel 5.

The programme primarily features coverage of featured games accompanied by a live studio show presented by Dermot O'Leary and Sam Quek, joined by former British-Nigerian defensive ends Osi Umenyiora and Efe Obada, and rotating celebrity guests. Two Sunday games are aired by 5 per-week, with the first airing on 5Action, and the second airing on 5.

== History ==
In August 2025, the NFL announced a new free-to-air broadcasting deal with 5 (a corporate sibling to U.S. NFL broadcaster CBS via Paramount Skydance), under which 5 and 5Action would air a weekly doubleheader of Sunday afternoon games (which air locally at 6:00 and 9:25 p.m. GMT), along with the NFL International Series games in London and Dublin, Thanksgiving Day games, three playoff games, and the Super Bowl.

5's studio coverage is produced by Hungry Bear Media in front of a live studio audience at Riverside Studios in Hammersmith. It is presented by Dermot O'Leary and Sam Quek, joined by two-time Super Bowl-winning defensive end Osi Umenyiora, Efe Obada, and a celebrity guest pundit.

During the 2025 NFL season, the early game aired on 5 was branded as NFL Big Game Night, and combined the game coverage with wraparound segments aimed towards casual viewers and family audiences. For the 2026 NFL season, the Big Game Night studio show was retooled as simply NFL on 5. In addition, the early game moved to 5Action, with 5 now airing the late game instead.

== Format ==
The programme is a wraparound for NFL telecasts on 5, encompassing a pre-game show, as well as interstitial segments aired during U.S. commercial time not taken by the UK broadcast.

During the 2025 season, the early game aired on 5 and was branded as NFL Big Game Night, which carried an entertainment-oriented format. Interstitial segments throughout the first half featured a game show, where two teams of audience members (representing the teams playing in the featured game) competed in a series of football-themed games and physical challenges for a chance to win a vacation to an NFL city. During the second half, as well as the second game on 5Action (which was billed as 5NFL), the segments focused more on in-game analysis from O'Leary, Umenyiora, Obada, and the celebrity guest. For Super Bowl LX, the programme was broadcast on-location from Santa Clara, California, eschewing the live audience and game show segments.

The programme was retooled for the 2026 season; it continues to feature a live audience and celebrity guests, but the game show was dropped in favour of more segments featuring analysis and discussions.

== Reception ==
NFL Big Game Night was widely-panned during its premiere (which featured comedian Joel Dommett), with criticism directed towards the replacement of analysis segments usually featured on NFL broadcasts in the UK with a game show described by viewers as being "embarrassing" and "[Alan] Partridge levels of cringe". The first game had an average of 166,000 viewers, peaking at 220,000.

O'Leary told the Radio Times prior to the 2026 season that the show would be retooled to feature less "knockabout stuff" and more analysis and involvement with guests, noting that he preferred "the sofa games, the play-along games, anything general knowledge that people can play along with at home", and wanted to convey the stories and "unpredictability" of the game. In response to the mixed reception to Big Game Night, he explained that "with any TV show, you try and make a show that you want to watch. If you start worrying too much about trying to please too many people all the time, you don't really become anything and your identity gets a little bit lost", and that "with a show like last year, you are going to have to work hard to win over those diehard fans because there's a level of analysis that they probably want."

== See also ==
- NFL on television
