= Holly & Fearne Go Dating =

- Starring: Holly Willoughby; Fearne Cotton
- Country of origin: United Kingdom

Production
- Running time: 30 minutes

Original release
- Network: ITV
- Release: 5 September – 16 September 2007

Holly & Fearne Go Dating is a British reality TV show which was first broadcast on ITV on 5 September 2007.

== Format ==
In the six-part series, Holly Willoughby and Fearne Cotton embarked on a mission in each episode to each find an ideal match for one of love's losers.

The show ended with a dinner date at the Hell's Kitchen restaurant in London. Here, the lonely heart enjoyed the company of both dates, one after the other. By the end of the night, the lonely heart had to choose either Cotton's or Willoughby's choice.

It is unlikely that the show will return. Willoughby presented a similar series, the revived Streetmate, on ITV2 in September/October 2007.

== Viewing figures ==
- Episode 1: 2.1m, 11% share
- Episode 2: 1.8m, 9%
- Episode 3: 1.6m, 8%
- Episode 4: 1.8m, 9%
- Episode 5: 1.10m, 5%
- Episode 6: 1.7m, 9%
