= Blessed (TV series) =

- Genre: Sitcom
- Created by: Ben Elton
- Directed by: Ben Elton
- Starring: Ardal O'Hanlon; Mel Giedroyc; Robert Webb; Sally Bretton; Russell Brand; Kelly Beckett; Hannah Jane Fox; Hannah Spearritt
- Opening theme: "Morningtown Ride" by the cast
- Country of origin: United Kingdom
- Original language: English
- No. of series: 1
- No. of episodes: 8

Production
- Camera setup: Multi-camera
- Running time: 30 minutes
- Production company: BBC Studios

Original release
- Network: BBC One
- Release: 14 October – 9 December 2005

Blessed is a BBC television sitcom created and directed by Ben Elton. The only series, of eight episodes, was broadcast on BBC One on Friday evenings at 9.00 between October and December 2005. It starred Ardal O'Hanlon and Mel Giedroyc as a couple of record producers, struggling to bring up two small children.

== Plot ==
Gary and Sue are an immature young couple trying to reconcile raising two young children with the dream of becoming successful record producers.

== Cast ==
- Ardal O'Hanlon as Gary Chandler
- Mel Giedroyc as Sue Chandler
- Robert Webb as Bill Hathaway
- Sally Bretton as Mary Hathaway
- Russell Brand as Tommy
- Kelly Beckett as Toppa
- Hannah Jane Fox as Vicky
- Rowland Rivron as Styx
- Michael McKell as Ronnie
- Hannah Spearritt as Sarah
- Ray Panthaki as Lance

== Episode guide ==
The episodes were named after song titles and the groups who sang them:

1. I'm So Tired (The Beatles)
2. Ever Fallen in Love with Someone (Buzzcocks)
3. I'm in Love with My Car (Queen)
4. Just Looking (Stereophonics)
5. Hit Me Baby One More Time (Britney Spears)
6. Who Wrote the Book of Love? (The Monotones)
7. Walk Like a Man (The Four Seasons)
8. Let's Spend the Night Together (The Rolling Stones)
