= S Club TV =

- Genre: Children's variety show Magazine show
- Presented by: Ben Barnes; Kelly Beckett; Amy Garcia; Holly Willoughby; Marcus O'Donovan; Fern Eliza Peat
- Country of origin: United Kingdom
- Original language: English
- No. of series: 1

Production
- Running time: 30 minutes
- Production companies: 19 Entertainment; At It Productions

Original release
- Network: ITV (CITV)
- Release: 15 September 2000 – 2001

Related
- S Club 7

S Club TV is a British children's television variety show and magazine show that originally aired on CITV from 2000 to 2001. Produced by At It Productions and Simon Fuller's 19 Entertainment, the series was created as a television brand extension of the highly successful pop group S Club 7.

Instead of featuring the actual members of the band, the show utilized a separate cast of young actors and television presenters who hosted segments, performed sketches, and portrayed fictionalised counterparts to the pop group. The series is notable for launching the early broadcasting careers of prominent British media personalities, including Holly Willoughby and actor Ben Barnes.

== Premise ==
Conceived during the peak of S Club 7's chart success, S Club TV was designed to anchor a broader "S Club universe" on children's television alongside the band's main narrative sitcoms (such as Miami 7 and L.A. 7). The fast-paced magazine format featured entertainment news, teen lifestyle segments, guest interviews, and music videos.

To create a unique and distinctive visual style against the solid-white studio backdrop, the seven main youth presenters famously hosted every episode completely barefoot, while visiting studio guests remained exempt from the rule.

== Cast and presenters ==
- Ben Barnes – Went on to achieve international fame as an actor, starring in The Chronicles of Narnia: Prince Caspian and the HBO series Westworld.
- Kelly Beckett – Later joined the international pop group Paradiso Girls.
- Amy Garcia – Later became a main presenter on BBC regional news programme BBC Look North
- Holly Willoughby – Landed the role at age 19; she later became one of the United Kingdom's most prominent television hosts, co-presenting This Morning and Dancing on Ice.
- Marcus O'Donovan
- Fern Eliza Peat

== Production ==
The series was commissioned in mid-2000 as part of ITV's autumn children's lineup to compete against the BBC's dominant youth scheduling. It was produced by At It Productions in tandem with 19 Management.
