= Stephanie Davis (actress) =

English actress (born 1993)

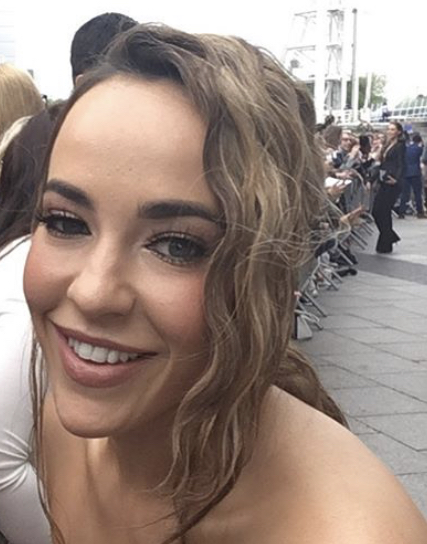
- Davis in 2019
- Born: Stephanie Ann Davis; 8 March 1993 (age 33); Prescot, Merseyside, England
- Occupation: Actress
- Years active: 2005–present
- Television: Over The Rainbow; Hollyoaks; Celebrity Big Brother; Coronation Street
- Partner: Owen Warner (2018–2019)
- Children: 2

Stephanie Ann Davis (born 8 March 1993) is an English actress. She began her career with small roles in British television series, and in 2010, she competed in the BBC talent-search Over the Rainbow. She was then cast in the Channel 4 soap opera Hollyoaks, playing Sinead O'Connor between 2010 and 2015, and again from 2018 to 2019. In 2016, she was the runner-up in the seventeenth series of Celebrity Big Brother. In May 2023, Davis joined the cast of ITV soap opera Coronation Street as Courtney Vance.

== Career ==
Davis began her career playing Gretl von Trapp in the Liverpool Empire Theatre's production of The Sound of Music when she was seven years old. A year later she played Little Nell in Her Benny and 2 years later aged 10 years old she landed the title role in the theatre's production of Annie.

Davis' television career began with guest roles in Holby City, Doctors, Parents of the Band and the television movie The Outsiders. In 2010, Davis took part in Over the Rainbow, which was a talent show searching for an actress to play Dorothy Gale in the Andrew Lloyd Webber production of The Wizard of Oz. She advanced to the seventh episode where she was voted off following a sing-off against Stephanie Fearon.

Following her appearance in Over the Rainbow, Davis went on to be cast as Sinead O'Connor in Hollyoaks and made her on-screen debut on 1 September 2010. On 16 July 2015, it was announced Davis' contract had been terminated. Her agent confirmed that she was fired from the job because she arrived on-set "unfit for work". In May 2018, Davis announced that she would be returning to Hollyoaks as Sinead, nearly three years after her sacking.

In November 2015, Davis signed up to appear on the fifteenth series of I'm a Celebrity...Get Me Out of Here!. She had to cancel her appearance because of a potentially fatal nut allergy. In January 2016, Davis appeared on the seventeenth series of Celebrity Big Brother as a contestant, eventually finishing the series as runner-up.

On 21 February 2020, Davis released a single titled "Lights Out".

== Personal life ==
Davis attended the prestigious Hammond School in Chester after winning a scholarship then attended De La Salle School in St Helens. She grew up in Whiston, Prescot, Merseyside. Her parents are named Pauline and Roy Davis and she has two younger brothers.

Davis had a widely publicised and tumultuous relationship with reality television personality Jeremy McConnell. In January 2017, Davis gave birth to their son. After their relationship ended, McConnell was found guilty of assaulting Davis; he received a 20-week suspended sentence and was ordered to carry out 200 hours of community service, and was later jailed for triggering his suspended sentence by failing to attend his community service appointments. In 2018, Davis had a relationship with her Hollyoaks colleague Owen Warner.

Davis has spoken openly about her mental health issues and depression. She has stated that she is in recovery and spent time in rehab. In November 2019, Davis revealed that she was diagnosed with high-functioning autism. In 2019, Davis had a mental health relapse and attempted suicide. She later discussed the incident when she started vlogging to help others.

In August 2024, Davis announced she was expecting her second child, another boy, with her then-partner Joe McKalroy. In June 2025, the couple separated.

== Filmography ==
Year	Title	Role	Notes
2005	Only in Whispers	Jess	Short film
2006	The Outsiders	Caitlin	Television movie
2007	Holby City	Macy Gardiner	Guest role
2008	Doctors	Lisa Lebbon	Guest role
2009	Parents of the Band	Laura	Guest role
2010	Over the Rainbow	Contestant	7th place
2010–2015, 2018–2019	Hollyoaks	Sinead O'Connor	Regular role
2012	Hollyoaks Later	Sinead O'Connor	Regular role
2016	Celebrity Big Brother 17	Contestant	2nd place
2016	Loose Women	Guest panellist	1 episode
2023	Coronation Street	Courtney Vance	Regular role

== Awards and nominations ==
Year	Award	Category	Result	Ref.
2011	Inside Soap Awards	Sexiest Female	Nominated	
2012	17th National Television Awards	Serial Drama Performance	Nominated	
2013	The British Soap Awards	Sexiest Female	Nominated	
2014	The British Soap Awards	Best Actress	Shortlisted	
2014	The British Soap Awards	Best Dramatic Performance	Shortlisted	
2014	Inside Soap Awards	Best Actress	Nominated	
2015	Inside Soap Awards	Best Affair (shared with Nick Pickard)	Shortlisted	
2019	TV Choice Awards	Best Soap Actress	Nominated	
2019	2019 British Soap Awards	Best Actress	Shortlisted	
2019	Inside Soap Awards	Best Actress	Won	
2019	I Talk Telly Awards	Best Soap Performance	Nominated	
2019	Digital Spy Reader Awards	Best Soap Actor (Female)	Won	
