= Kelly Beckett =

British singer

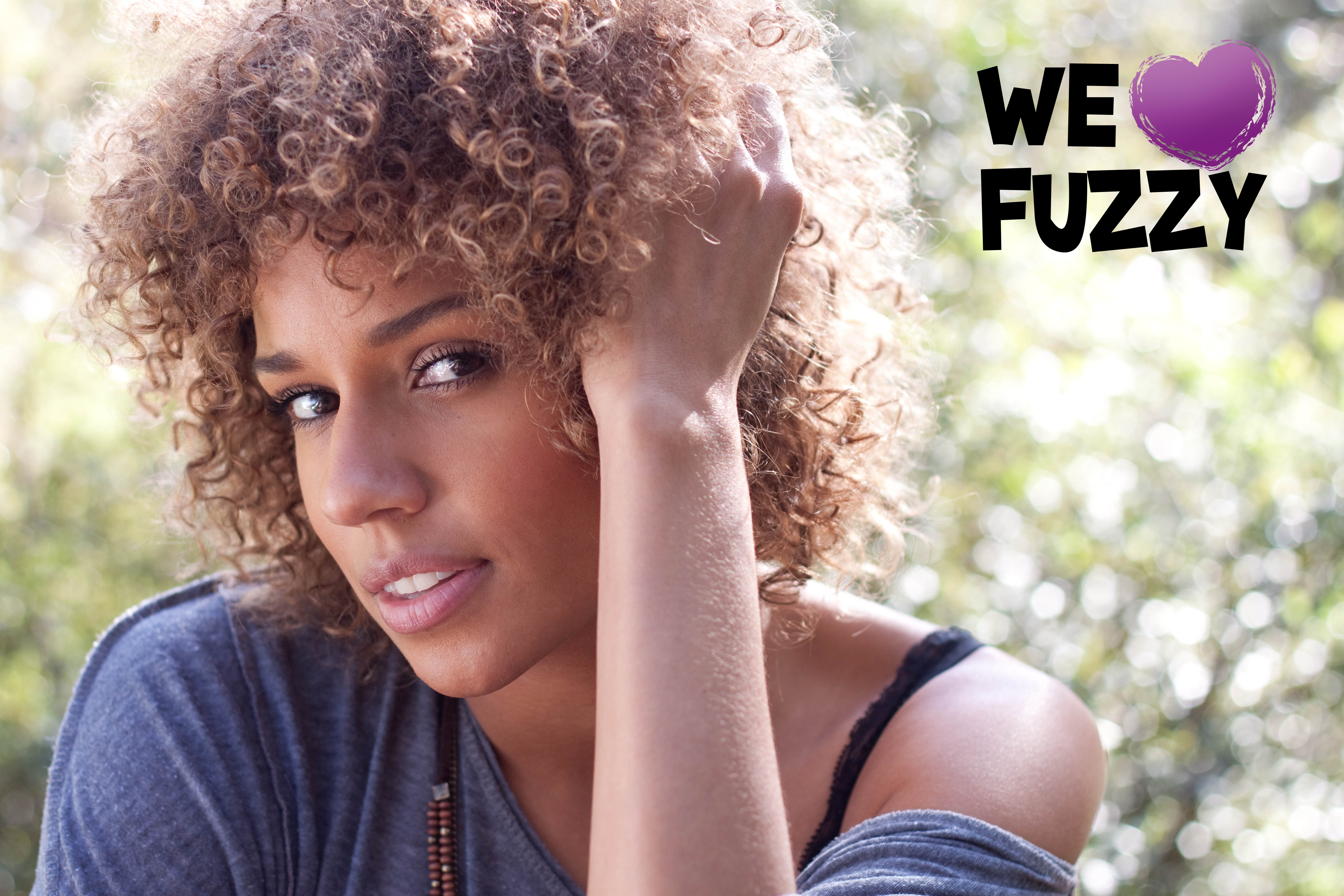
- Donnelly in 2010
- Born: Nottingham, Nottinghamshire, England
- Occupations: Singer, television host
- Spouse: Niall Donnelly

Kelly Donnelly (formerly Kelly Beckett) is a British singer and television host. She is best known as a member of the musical group Paradiso Girls and more recently as a television host on Style Network, G4 and ENTV - where she is known as "Fuzzy" and covers everything from the Grammys to the Oscars. In June 2018, she announced the launch of her new music project under the stage name A Girl Called She. The first single and video "I AM SHE" was released 30 Oct 2018.

== Early life ==
Donnelly was born in Nottingham, Nottinghamshire, of Barbadian heritage. She received a musical theatre diploma from Midlands Academy of Dance and Drama and trained at the Actor's Temple in London.

== Career ==
Kelly was signed straight out of college by Simon Fuller and 19 Management to host a kids' TV show S Club TV. In 2007, Donnelly joined the musical group Paradiso Girls, after auditioning in London. The Los Angeles-based girl group was signed to will.i.am Music Group/Interscope Records. The Paradiso Girls released their debut single "Patron Tequila", featuring Lil Jon and Eve in April 2009, which reached number 3 on the Billboard's Hot Dance Club chart. The girls were also featured in a remix of the will.i.am song "I Got It from My Mama".

Donnelly hosted live Attack of the Show! and pre-recorded TV shows for the G4 Network owned by NBC Universal.
