= X-periMENTAL =

British children's game show

- Genre: Game show
- Presented by: Ortis Deley (2003); Simon Grant (2004)
- Starring: Holly Willoughby (2003); Jane Farnham (2004)
- Country of origin: United Kingdom
- Original language: English
- No. of series: 2
- No. of episodes: 22

Production
- Running time: 15 minutes
- Production company: Initial

Original release
- Network: BBC One
- Release: 8 January 2003 – 1 March 2004

X-periMENTAL is a children's game show that aired on BBC One from 8 January 2003 to 1 March 2004. It is first hosted by Ortis Deley in 2003 and then hosted by Simon Grant in 2004.

== Format ==
=== Series 1 ===
2 teams of 3 from different schools would battle in various science experiments and the objective was to get in 1st or 2nd on the leaderboard. Then the top two at the end of the series would compete to become champions.

=== Series 2 ===
There was the studio audience who had to guess to right outcomes of the experiments with an A, B or C option. The audience designs are also put to the test for real life situations.

== Transmissions ==
Series	Episodes	Originally released	
Series	Episodes	First released	Last released
1	13	8 January 2003	2 April 2003
2	9	5 January 2004	1 March 2004
