= Jeremy McConnell =

Irish model and reality television star

- Born: Adrian Jeremy McConnell-Cooke; Dublin, Ireland
- Occupation: Model • reality TV star
- Children: 2

Jeremy McConnell is an Irish model and reality television star.

McConnell was featured as a cast member in MTV's Beauty School Cop Outs. It was inaccurately reported that McConnell was Mr. Ireland in 2012; he was actually runner-up, but did win Mr. Dublin. In January 2016, he became a housemate in the British television programme, Celebrity Big Brother competing in the seventeenth series. On 29 January 2016, he became the sixth housemate to be evicted having received the fewest votes to save, spending a total of 26 days in the house.

== Personal life ==
In August 2017, he was sentenced to 20 weeks in prison, suspended for 12 months and ordered to carry out 200 hours of community service for assaulting his ex-girlfriend, Stephanie Davis, with whom he has a child, a son named Caben, born in January of the same year.

In November 2017, he was jailed for triggering his suspended sentence by failing to attend several community service appointments in order to travel to Turkey to receive a hair and beard transplant. Rejecting a recommendation that he be ordered to perform additional hours of community service, District Judge Wendy Lloyd activated his sentence, but reduced the custodial term to 18 weeks as credit for community service already completed.

In November 2019, McConnell's girlfriend, Katie McCreath, gave birth to their daughter Storm.
