= Edward Murray (judge) =

British judge

The Honourable Mr Justice Murray
- Royal coat of arms of the United Kingdom

High Court Judge King's Bench Division
- Incumbent
- Assumed office 1 October 2018
- Monarch: Charles III

Personal details
- Born: 4 May 1958 (age 68) Washington, DC, United States
- Citizenship: United Kingdom; United States
- Education: Harvard Law School; Trinity College Dublin

Sir Edward Henry Murray (born 4 May 1958) is an American-born British High Court judge.

== Early life and education ==
Murray was born on 4 May 1958 in Washington, DC, United States and attended St. Anselm's Abbey School in Washington, DC. He completed an MA in philosophy at Trinity College Dublin in 1980 and a JD cum laude at Harvard Law School in 1985.

== Legal career ==
In 1986, he was admitted to the New York State Bar and was an associate of Sidley & Austin from 1986 to 1990. In 1992, he was admitted as a solicitor and joined Allen & Overy as an associate, being promoted to partner in 1993 and served in the derivates structure group at the firm until 2013. He is a naturalised UK citizen. Though he did not have a background as an advocate, he was appointed as a recorder in 2009 and a deputy High Court judge in 2013.

On 1 October 2018, Murray was appointed a judge of the High Court and assigned to the King's Bench Division. He took the customary knighthood in the same year. Since 2022, he has been Presiding Judge of the South Eastern Circuit.

On 12 July 2024, Murray sentenced Gavin Plumb to life imprisonment with a minimum term of 16 years, for the foiled abduction and murder plot of former This Morning television presenter Holly Willoughby.

== Personal life ==
In 1984, he married Andrea Stang, with whom he has one daughter; they later divorced in 2018. In 2019, he married Bina Pandey.
