= Holly Willoughby =

English television presenter, model and author (born 1981)

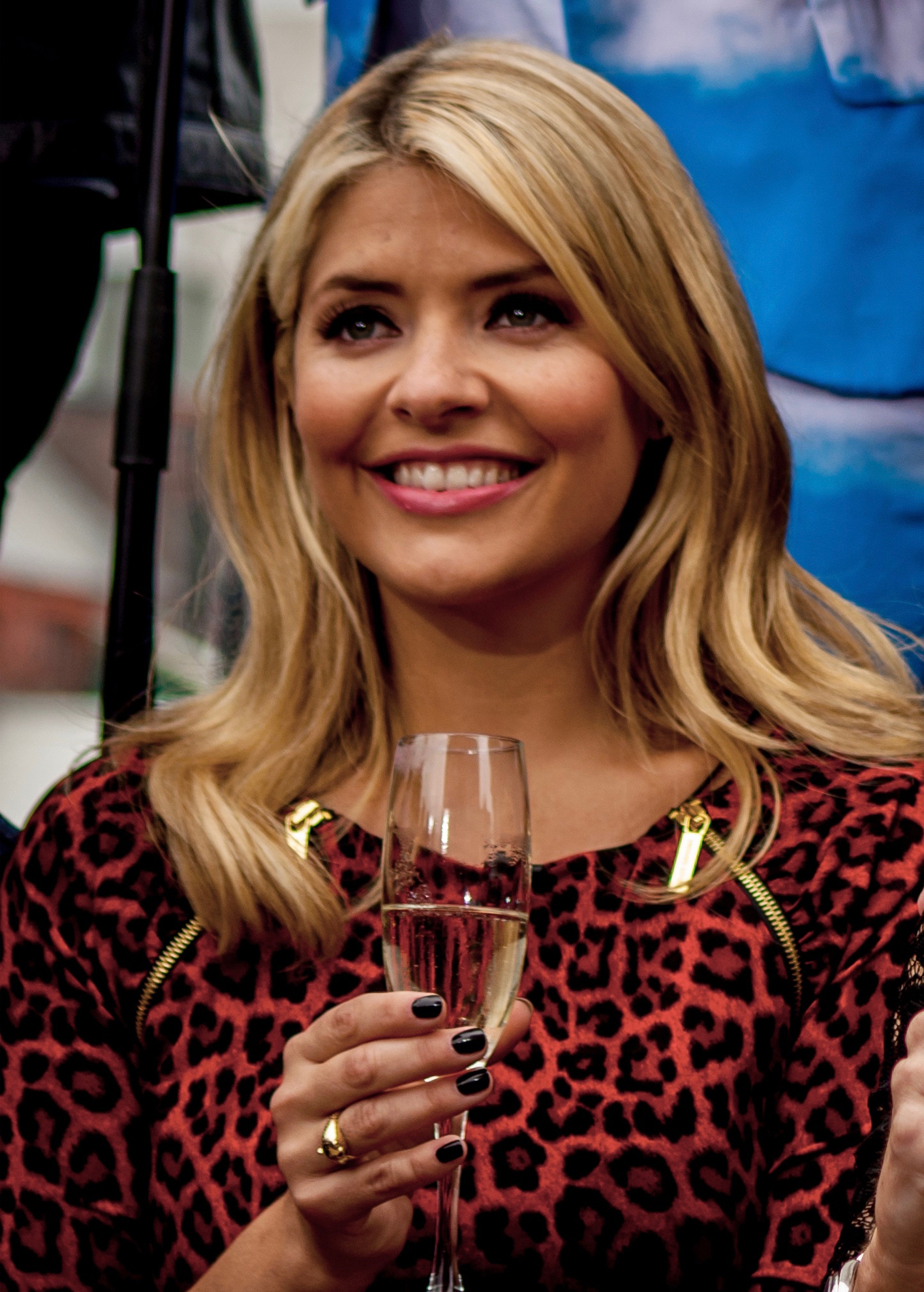
- Willoughby in 2013
- Born: Holly Marie Willoughby; 10 February 1981 (age 45); Brighton, East Sussex, England
- Education: College of Richard Collyer
- Occupations: Television presenter; author; model
- Years active: 2000–present
- Employer(s): ITV; BBC
- Spouse: Dan Baldwin (m. 2007)
- Children: 3
- Website: officialhollywilloughby.com

Holly Marie Willoughby (/ˈwɪləbi/ WIL-ə-bee; born 10 February 1981) is an English television presenter, author and model. She has presented several ITV television shows, most notably This Morning (2009–2023) and Dancing on Ice (2006–2011, 2018–2025).

Willoughby's other television work includes The Xtra Factor (2008–2009), Text Santa (2011–2013, 2015), The Voice UK (2012–2013), Surprise Surprise (2012–2015), Play to the Whistle (2015–2017), I'm a Celebrity...Get Me Out of Here! (2018), Freeze the Fear with Wim Hof (2022), and The Games (2022). From 2008 to 2020, she also served as a team captain on the ITV2 comedy panel show Celebrity Juice. She is also a brand ambassador for Marks & Spencer and Garnier.

== Early life ==
Holly Marie Willoughby was born on 10 February 1981 in Brighton, East Sussex, the younger of two daughters of Brian Willoughby, a sales manager of a double-glazing company, and Linda Willoughby (née Fleming), a former air stewardess. She grew up in Woodmancote, West Sussex, and was educated at the independent Burgess Hill Girls in the town of Burgess Hill, and the College of Richard Collyer in Horsham.

In 1995, at the age of 14, Willoughby was spotted by talent scouts at The Clothes Show Live exhibition and signed with the model agency, Storm Management. She appeared in teen magazines such as Mizz, Just Seventeen, More!, and Shout. At the age of 17, Willoughby began modeling bras, underwear, and tights for clients including Pretty Polly, appearing in advertisements and posters.

== Career ==
=== 2000–2005: Children's presenting ===
In 2000, Willoughby won an audition for S Club TV, a CITV children's magazine programme based on the pop group S Club 7. The show featured young actors, including Willoughby, who presented segments while portraying fictional counterparts to the band. She also appeared in a show called S Club 7: Artistic Differences playing a character called Zoe with the regular members of the band. Willoughby later worked as a receptionist and then as a runner and assistant floor manager for the now-defunct shopping channel Auction World.tv.

Willoughby also took on menial jobs and started an Open University course in psychotherapy. She later found work as an assistant manager, during which time she persuaded a friend to make a showreel of her. The showreel secured her an agent, who then contacted the BBC. Later in 2002, Willoughby presented a factual entertainment programme for children called Xchange and went on to host several other children's shows for CBBC: X-periMENTAL and CBBC at the Fame Academy (CBBC's version of the BBC talent show Fame Academy).

Willoughby's first role as a children's television presenter came when she rejoined CITV in 2004 to co-present the entertainment show Ministry of Mayhem which aired on Saturday mornings. The programme competed against CBBC's Dick & Dom in da Bungalow. On this programme she met her future husband Dan Baldwin, one of the show's producers. In 2006, the show's title was changed to Holly & Stephen's Saturday Showdown to reflect the popularity of its co-presenters, Willoughby and Stephen Mulhern.

In 2005, Willoughby presented Feel the Fear, a children's entertainment programme in which the presenters are set unnerving challenges. She has also had a number of minor appearances on other children's programmes. Willoughby presented CD:UK for a short while in the spring of 2005, replacing Cat Deeley before Myleene Klass, Lauren Laverne and Johny Pitts became the regular presenters. In recognition of work as a children's television presenter, Willoughby won a BAFTA Children's Award in 2006.

=== 2006–2008 ===
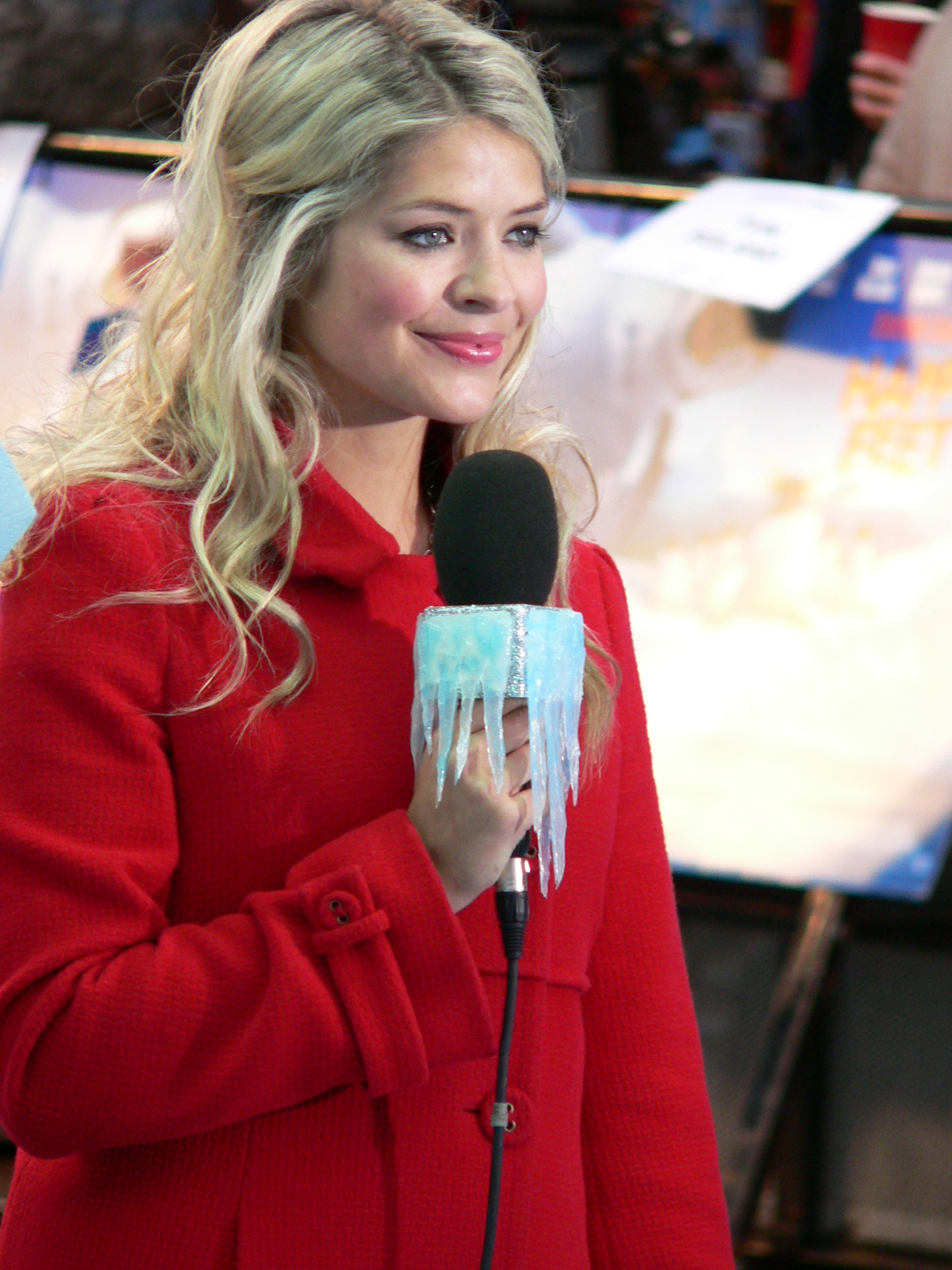
Willoughby at the premiere of Happy Feet in 2006

In 2006, she was selected to co-present, with Phillip Schofield, the television show Dancing on Ice, in which celebrities are partnered with professional dancers to learn ice-dancing routines which are judged by a panel of experts and voted on by audiences. She remained in the role until 2011, when she left due to new commitments. She was replaced by Christine Lampard.

Willoughby has presented a number of other ITV programmes, including spin-off shows such as Celebrity Wrestling: Bring It On in 2005, Greased Lightnin' in 2007, and The Xtra Factor for two years in 2008 and 2009.

In 2007, she took over from Davina McCall as the presenter of Streetmate, a dating game show during its transition from Channel 4 to ITV2. Willoughby hosted the show for its final series. In the same year, Willoughby co-presented Holly & Fearne Go Dating with Fearne Cotton. The show saw the two hosts attempt to find dates for single people that they meet around the UK.

Since 2008, Willoughby appeared as a team captain on Celebrity Juice, presenting series 1–11 and 13–23 (taking a break in series 12 due to maternity leave). She left the show after 12 years in May 2020.

=== 2009–2023 ===
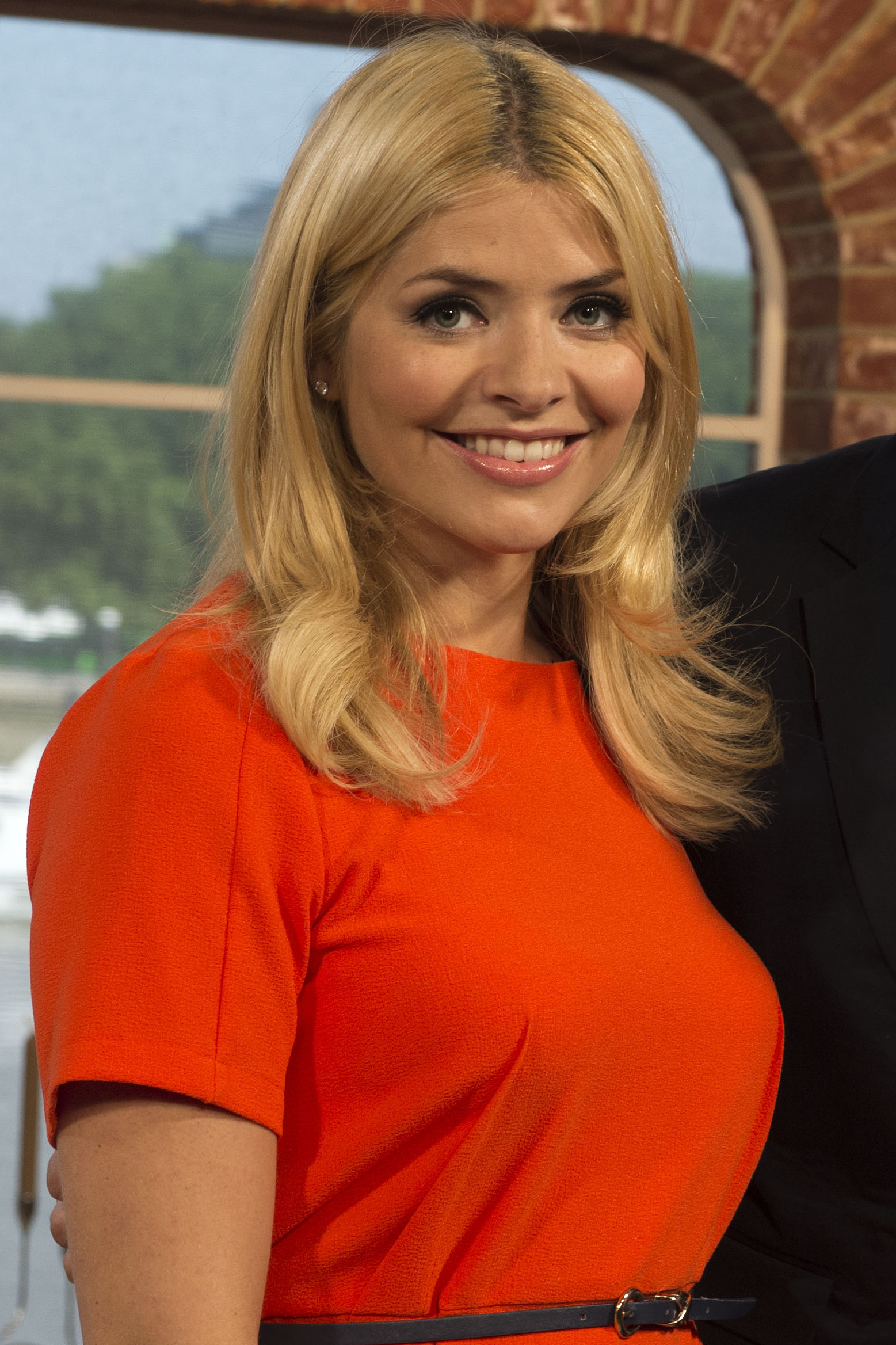
Willoughby on the set of This Morning in 2013, a programme she co-presented between 2009 and 2023

Willoughby began co-presenting ITV's This Morning with Schofield in September 2009 until his departure in May 2023, replacing Fern Britton. Willoughby presented the programme from Monday to Thursday mornings until her departure in October 2023. She and Schofield developed a close friendship, with Schofield describing her as "the sister he never had". During Willoughby's tenure as co-presenter, This Morning won the National Television Award for Best Daytime Programme for twelve consecutive years from 2011 to 2022, the longest winning streak in the award's history, with Willoughby among those who regularly accepted the award on behalf of the programme.

In 2011, Willoughby co-presented charity telethon Text Santa with Ant & Dec. She returned to co-host the show with Schofield in 2012, 2013 and 2015. On 24 March 2012, Willoughby began presenting The Voice UK with Reggie Yates. She decided to leave the show after the second series and was replaced by Emma Willis in 2014. In 2012, Willoughby began hosting a revived version of Surprise Surprise. A second series began airing on 15 September 2013, a third on 22 October 2014 and a fourth on 21 June 2015. In 2015, Willoughby presented the sports-based panel show Play to the Whistle on ITV. The first series aired for seven episodes beginning on 11 April 2015. A second series aired for six episodes, beginning in April 2016, and a third series aired in 2017.

In 2016, Willoughby presented primetime Saturday night dating show Meet the Parents for ITV. The show has been compared with Blind Date. In August 2018, it was announced that Willoughby would host the eighteenth series of I'm a Celebrity...Get Me Out of Here! alongside Declan Donnelly as his usual partner Ant McPartlin took a year-long break.

Willoughby has written a series of children's books with her sister Kelly. Their debut book School for Stars: First Term at L'Etoile became the UK's highest-selling children's book of 2013.

In addition to her recognition from prestigious industry awards, Willoughby has received several magazine-based honours. In 2009 she was named Ultimate TV Presenter at the Cosmopolitan Ultimate Women of the Year Awards. She later won the Presenter award at the Glamour Women of the Year Awards in 2012 and again in 2016.

In August 2017, it was reported Willoughby had received a £200,000 pay rise to match the salary of Schofield. She returned to present the new series of Dancing on Ice with Schofield in January 2018. Willoughby is a brand ambassador for Marks & Spencer and Garnier, and a former ambassador for Diet Coke in the UK. In September 2021, Willoughby founded a wellness and lifestyle brand and company called Wylde Moon.

In 2018, Willoughby and Schofield made a cameo appearance on Coronation Street, when they interviewed Rosie Webster, Craig Tinker and Gemma Winter on This Morning.

On 10 October 2023, Willoughby announced her departure from This Morning, after more than 14 years in the role.

In 2025, Willoughby presented the Netflix reality competition series Celebrity Bear Hunt, starring Bear Grylls.

==== The lying-in-state of Elizabeth II ====
During the period of national mourning following the death of Elizabeth II in September 2022, Willoughby and Phillip Schofield attended the Queen's lying-in-state at Westminster Hall in their capacity as accredited members of the press while filming a segment for This Morning. ITV stated that they accessed the hall via the official media route and did not join the public queue or file past the coffin. Their presence drew criticism on social media from some viewers, who mistakenly believed they had bypassed the queue for members of the public.

==== Response to Schofield affair ====
Willoughby said in response to Schofield's departure from This Morning: "It's been over 13 great years presenting This Morning with Phil and I want to take this opportunity to thank him for all of his knowledge, his experience and his humour. The sofa won't feel the same without him." A broadcasting executive subsequently told The Times that Willoughby had given ITV an ultimatum that either she or Schofield had to leave the programme. In a statement to the Daily Mail on 26 May, Schofield admitted that, before leaving his wife in 2020, he had carried on an extramarital affair with a younger male ITV co-worker.

Willoughby, who had previously said she was hurt that Schofield had lied to her when she asked about the rumours, returned to This Morning on 5 June for the first time since his departure. Stating that she felt "shaken, troubled and let down," she said that everyone at the programme had given "love and support to someone who was not telling the truth." She expressed concern for Schofield's mental health, thanked viewers for their kindness and support, and said "what unites us all now is a desire to heal."

== Personal life ==
Willoughby is dyslexic.

Her sister, Kelly, also works in the television industry.

In Amberley, West Sussex on 4 August 2007, Willoughby married Dan Baldwin who is co-founder of Hungry Bear Media and a former producer on Ministry of Mayhem and later executive producer on Celebrity Juice. They have two sons and a daughter.

In 2008, Willoughby became a patron of the charity Together for Short Lives.

=== Murder plot ===
On 4 October 2023, Gavin Plumb, a 36-year-old man from Harlow, was arrested for solicitation and incitement over an alleged plot to abduct and murder Willoughby. He was accused of contacting another man in the United States, who was in fact an undercover police officer, and asking him to come to the UK for the purpose of kidnapping and murdering Willoughby. He is reported to have told the officer that he had "assembled a kidnap and restraint kit capable of encouraging or assisting the commission of the kidnap of Holly Willoughby". Willoughby was made aware of the plot on 5 October and was taken into protective custody, with Alison Hammond filling in Willoughby's role on This Morning.

Plumb appeared at Chelmsford Magistrates Court on 6 October, where he was remanded into custody on charges of soliciting to commit murder and incitement to kidnap, rape, and murder. The trial began in June 2024. On 4 July 2024, Plumb was found guilty of soliciting murder, encouraging or assisting the commission of kidnap, and encouraging or assisting the commission of rape. Plumb had previously been imprisoned for attempted kidnap and false imprisonment. At Chelmsford Crown Court on 12 July, Mr Justice Murray sentenced Plumb to life imprisonment with a minimum term of 16 years.

Willoughby waived her right to anonymity, which is usually granted to alleged victims of sexual offences. She did not attend any of the court proceedings. At Willoughby's request, her victim impact statement was not released to the public, but was mentioned by the prosecution as showing "catastrophic" consequences.

On 21 October 2025, the Court of Appeal upheld Plumb's sentence.

== Filmography ==
=== Television ===
Year	Title	Role	Notes
2000	S Club 7: Artistic Differences	Zoe	TV special
2000-2001	S Club TV	Presenter	
2002	Xchange	Presenter	
2002–2003	CBBC at the Fame Academy	Presenter	
2003	X-periMENTAL	Presenter	
2004	Junior Eurovision Song Contest: The British Final	Presenter	
2004	GameStars	Presenter	TV special
2004–2006	Ministry of Mayhem / Holly & Stephen's Saturday Showdown	Co-presenter	With Stephen Mulhern
2005	CD:UK	Presenter	
2005	Feel the Fear	Presenter	
2005	Celebrity Wrestling: Bring It On	Presenter	
2006	Lip Service	Presenter	
2006	Showbiz Darts	Contestant	3 episodes
2006–2011, 2018–2025	Dancing on Ice	Co-presenter	
2006–2021	Ant & Dec's Saturday Night Takeaway	Herself / Guest presenter	10 episodes
2007	The Westlife Show: Live	Presenter	TV special
2007	Greased Lightnin'	Presenter	
2007	Streetmate	Presenter	1 series
2007	Holly & Fearne Go Dating	Herself	Co-star with Fearne Cotton
2007	All Star Family Fortunes	Herself	1 episode
2008	Here Come the Boys	Presenter	
2008–2009	The Xtra Factor	Presenter	
2008–2020	Celebrity Juice	Panellist	Team captain; series 1–23
2009	Cheryl Cole's Night In	Presenter	TV special
2009	Piers Morgan's Life Stories	Herself	1 episode
2009–2023	This Morning	Co-presenter	
2010	Agatha Christie's Marple	Goody Carne	Cameo
2010	All Star Mr & Mrs	Herself	1 episode
2011	CBeebies Bedtime Stories	Storyteller	4 episodes
2011–2013, 2015	Text Santa	Co-presenter	
2012–2013	The Voice UK	Co-presenter	With Reggie Yates
2012–2013	Lemon La Vida Loca	Herself	3 episodes
2012–2015	Surprise Surprise	Presenter	4 series
2013	Walk on the Wild Side	Guest presenter	Series 3, episode 2
2013	Through the Keyhole	Herself	1 episode
2014	Duck Quacks Don't Echo	Panellist	2 episodes
2015–2017	Play to the Whistle	Presenter	3 series
2016	Meet the Parents	Presenter	
2018	Coronation Street	Herself	Cameo with Phillip Schofield
2018	I'm a Celebrity...Get Me Out of Here!	Co-presenter	With Dec Donnelly
2019–2021	Take Off with Bradley & Holly	Co-presenter	With Bradley Walsh
2020	Michael McIntyre's The Wheel	Contestant	Christmas special
2021	The Masked Dancer	Guest judge	Season 1, Episode 7: "Final"
2021	Midsomer Murders	Herself	Cameo; Season 22, Episode 6
2021	Ted Lasso	Herself	Season 2, Episode 2
2022	Freeze the Fear with Wim Hof	Co-presenter	With Lee Mack
2022	The Games	Co-presenter	With Freddie Flintoff
2022	Munya and Filly Get Chilly	Herself	6 episodes
2022	This England	Herself	1 episode
2022	Would I Lie to You?	Herself	1 episode
2024, 2025	You Bet!	Co–presenter (2024), Guest Panellist (2025)	With Stephen Mulhern (2024), 1 episode (2025)
2025	Celebrity Bear Hunt	Presenter	

=== Film ===
Year	Title	Role	Notes
2012	Keith Lemon: The Film	Herself	Cameo

== Bibliography ==
- The Best Friends' Guide to Life (with Fearne Cotton, October 2010) ISBN 978-0091935405
- Truly Happy Baby (June 2016) ISBN 978-0008172527
- Truly Scrumptious Baby (October 2017) ISBN 978-0008172565
- Reflections (October 2021) ISBN 978-1529135718

=== School for Stars series ===
All books written with Kelly Willoughby

- First Term at L'Etoile (2013) ISBN 978-1444008111
- Second Term at L'Etoile (2013) ISBN 978-1444008135
- Third Term at L'Etoile (2014) ISBN 978-1444008159
- Summer Holiday Mystery (2014) ISBN 978-1444008173
- Double Trouble at L'Etoile (2015) ISBN 978-1444014556
- The Missing Ballerina Mystery (2015) ISBN 978-1444014570
- Princess Rescue (2016) ISBN 978-1444014594
- Best Friends Forever (2016) ISBN 978-1444014617

== Awards and nominations ==
Year	Award	Category	Nominated work	Result	Ref.
2005	BAFTA Children's Awards	Best Presenter	Ministry of Mayhem	Nominated	
2006	BAFTA Children's Awards	Best Presenter	Holly & Stephen's Saturday Showdown	Won	
2010	National Television Awards	Most Popular Entertainment Presenter	This Morning and Dancing on Ice	Nominated	
2012	National Reality TV Awards	Best TV Presenter	The Voice UK	Nominated	
2017	TRIC Awards	TV Personality of the Year	—	Won	
2018	National Television Awards	Most Popular TV Presenter	This Morning	Nominated	
2019	National Television Awards	Most Popular TV Presenter	This Morning	Nominated	
2019	TRIC Awards	TV Personality of the Year	—	Won	
2020	National Television Awards	Most Popular TV Presenter	This Morning	Nominated	
2021	National Television Awards	Most Popular TV Presenter	This Morning	Nominated	
