= Celebrity Big Brother (British TV series) series 17 =

Celebrity Big Brother
- Series 17
- Series seventeen logo
- Presented by: Emma Willis
- No. of days: 32
- No. of housemates: 16
- Winner: Scotty T
- Runner-up: Stephanie Davis
- Companion shows: Big Brother's Bit on the Side
- No. of episodes: 36

Release
- Original network: Channel 5
- Original release: 5 January – 5 February 2016

Series chronology
- ← Previous; Series 16 Next → Series 18

Celebrity Big Brother 17 is the seventeenth series of the British reality television series Celebrity Big Brother, hosted by Emma Willis and narrated by Marcus Bentley. The series launched on 5 January 2016 on Channel 5 in the United Kingdom and TV3 in the Republic of Ireland, and concluded 32 days later on 5 February 2016, making it the longest celebrity series to date, along with Celebrity Big Brother 19 and Celebrity Big Brother 21. It was the tenth celebrity series and the fifteenth series of Big Brother overall to air on Channel 5. First details of the series were released on 7 December 2015 when the new eye was released, and a new "vaudeville theatre" theme also being confirmed.

This series was the first celebrity edition to launch under the new three-year contract that was announced in March 2015 which guaranteed the show remained on Channel 5 until 2018.

With sixteen celebrities, this series had the most housemates since the show began in 2001. However this is now held by Celebrity Big Brother 19 with eighteen. With three voluntary exits from Angie Bowie, David Gest and Jonathan Cheban, this series equalled the record with series 5 in 2007, which also had three housemates walk from the house. On 5 February 2016, the series was won by Scotty T, with Stephanie Davis finishing as runner-up.

== Format ==
Celebrity Big Brother is a game show in which a group of celebrity contestants, referred to as housemates, live in isolation from the outside world in a custom built "house", constantly under video surveillance. During their time in the House, the housemates are required to nominate two of their fellow contestants for potential eviction, and the two or more with the most votes would be nominated. This process is mandatory for all housemates, and failure to comply could result in expulsion from the House. The public then vote, with one of those celebrities evicted from the house. When the final week arrives, the viewers vote for which of the remaining celebrities should win the series, and the housemate with the most votes becomes the winner.

During their time in the House, housemates are given weekly tasks to perform. The housemates wager a portion of their weekly shopping budget on the task, and either win double their wagered fund or lose the wagered fund depending on their performance in the task. The housemates are required to work as a group to complete their tasks, with the format of the tasks varying based on the number of remaining housemates. Throughout the series, some housemates have been given secret tasks that must either be completed individually or with a small group; failure to do so can result in the housemate being nominated or punished in the House. Should the housemates run out of the food provided for them, an emergency ration was available to them. The housemates are forbidden from discussing nominations, and doing so could result in punishment. The format of the series is mainly seen as a social experiment, and requires housemates to interact with others who may have differing ideals, beliefs, and prejudices. Housemates are also required to make visits to the Diary Room during their stay in the House, where they are able to share their thoughts and feelings on their fellow housemates and the game.

== Housemates ==
The official list of Housemates was confirmed on 5 January 2016.

Celebrity	Age on entry	Notability	Day entered	Day exited	Status
Scotty T	27	Reality TV star	1	32	Winner
Stephanie Davis	22	Actress	1	32	Runner-up
Darren Day	47	Actor and singer	1	32	3rd place
Tiffany Pollard	33	Reality TV star	1	32	4th place
Danniella Westbrook	42	Actress	1	32	5th place
John Partridge	44	Actor	1	32	6th place
Gemma Collins	34	Reality TV star	1	29	Evicted
Jeremy McConnell	25	Reality TV star and model	1	25	Evicted
Christopher Maloney	38	Singer	1	22	Evicted
Megan McKenna	23	Reality TV star	1	18	Evicted
Kristina Rihanoff	38	Professional dancer	1	15	Evicted
Angie Bowie	66	Ex-wife of David Bowie	1	15	Walked
David Gest †	62	Producer and TV personality	1	13	Walked
Nancy Dell'Olio	54	Ex-girlfriend of Sven-Göran Eriksson	1	11	Evicted
Jonathan Cheban	41	Reality TV star	1	7	Walked
Winston McKenzie	62	Former boxer and UKIP candidate	1	4	Evicted

=== Angie Bowie ===
Angie Bowie is an American actress, model and musician. She is the ex-wife of English musician David Bowie and the mother of film director Duncan Jones. She entered the house on Day 1. On Day 7, Angie was informed off-camera that her ex-husband David Bowie had died, however she decided to remain in the house despite being given the option to leave. Angie voluntarily left the house on Day 15.

=== Christopher Maloney ===
Christopher Maloney was a contestant on the ninth series of The X Factor; where he reached the final, finishing third. He competed in the same series as Big Brother's Bit on the Side host Rylan Clark. He entered the house on Day 1. He became the fifth housemate to be evicted on Day 22.

=== Danniella Westbrook ===
Danniella Westbrook is an English actress, most notable for playing Sam Mitchell in the BBC soap opera EastEnders on and off between 1990 and 2016. In 2013, she appeared as Trudy Ryan in Hollyoaks. She also competed in the second series of I'm a Celebrity...Get Me Out of Here! in 2003 before taking part in Dancing on Ice in 2010. She entered the house on Day 1. She finished in fifth place on Day 32.

=== Darren Day ===
Darren Day is an English actor and television personality well known for his West End theatre starring roles, and briefly appearing in the Channel 4 soap opera Hollyoaks as Danny Houston in 2010. He entered the house on Day 1 but spent the first night in "The Box" following the launch night twist. He finished in third place on Day 32.

=== David Gest ===
David Gest was an American producer, television personality, and ex-husband of Liza Minnelli. He entered the house on Day 1. On Day 13, David left the house on medical grounds. On 12 April 2016, Gest died of a stroke.

=== Gemma Collins ===
Gemma Collins is an English reality television personality, best known for starring in the ITV2 semi-reality programme The Only Way Is Essex from the second series in 2011 until the fifteenth series in 2015. She has also taken part in a number of reality shows such as Splash! and I'm a Celebrity...Get Me Out of Here! where she left the jungle after three days. She was the first to enter the house on Day 1. She became the seventh housemate to be evicted on Day 29.

=== Jeremy McConnell ===
Jeremy McConnell is an Irish model and reality television star, who was featured as a cast member in MTV's Beauty School Cop Outs. He is best friends with ex–Big Brother housemate Marc O'Neill. He entered the house on Day 1. He was the sixth housemate to be evicted on Day 25.

=== John Partridge ===
John Partridge is an English actor who is known best for playing Christian Clarke in the BBC soap opera EastEnders regularly from 2008 to 2012, and then again in 2014, 2015 and 2016 for three guest appearances. He entered the house on Day 1 but spent the first night in "The Box" following the launch night twist. He left the house on Day 32, finishing in sixth place.

=== Jonathan Cheban ===
Jonathan Cheban is an American television personality and founder of website TheDishh.com. He is best known for his friendship with Kim Kardashian as well as appearing in her reality shows such as Keeping Up with the Kardashians. He entered the house on Day 1. Jonathan voluntarily left the house on Day 7.

=== Kristina Rihanoff ===
Kristina Rihanoff is a Russian ballroom dancer and choreographer, who had competed as one of the female professional partners on Strictly Come Dancing, from 2008 to 2015. She entered the house on Day 1. On Day 3, Kristina announced that she was three months pregnant. She became the third housemate to be evicted on Day 15.

=== Megan McKenna ===
Megan McKenna is an English reality television star, who was featured as a cast member on the third series of MTV's Ex on the Beach where she came known for her fling with The Magaluf Weekender star Jordan Davies. She entered the house on Day 1. On Day 10, Megan was issued a formal warning for aggressive behaviour and language used during an argument the previous night. On Day 18, she became the fourth housemate to be evicted. She briefly returned to the house on Day 30 as part of a task.

=== Nancy Dell'Olio ===
Nancy Dell'Olio is an Italian-English lawyer who first came to public notice as the girlfriend of Sven-Göran Eriksson, the manager of the England national football team. During their turbulent relationship, Sven was known to have had affairs with ex-celebrity housemates Faria Alam and Ulrika Jonsson. She was the final housemate to enter the house on Day 1. She became the second housemate to be evicted on Day 11.

=== Scotty T ===
Scott Timlin (also known as Scotty T) is an English reality television personality, who rose to fame as a cast member in the MTV reality series, Geordie Shore from series 4 onwards. He entered the house on Day 1. On Day 32, he left the house as the winner of the series making him the second star of Geordie Shore to win following Charlotte Crosby.

=== Stephanie Davis ===
Stephanie Davis is an English actress and most notable for playing Sinead O'Connor in the Channel 4 soap opera Hollyoaks from 2010 until 2015 where she was axed from the show. Prior to this she competed in the 2010 BBC talent-search Over the Rainbow. She entered the house on Day 1. On Day 13, Stephanie was given a warning for using threatening language the previous night. On Day 24, she was given another warning for her behaviour during an argument the previous night. She finished as runner-up on Day 32.

=== Tiffany Pollard ===
Tiffany Pollard, also known by her stage name New York, is an American reality television personality and actress; best known for her appearances in VH1's reality shows such as Flavor of Love and I Love New York. She entered the house on Day 1. On Day 7 she mistakenly declared David Gest had died, after housemate Angie Bowie confided in her that "David's dead." On Day 10, Tiffany was issued a warning for aggressive behaviour used in an argument during the previous night. She finished in fourth place on Day 32.

=== Winston McKenzie ===
Winston McKenzie is an English perennial candidate for office and former boxer. He entered the house on Day 1. On Day 3, Winston received a warning regarding unacceptable behaviour towards the women in the house. He became the first to be evicted on Day 4 and was heavily booed. During his time in the house, he caused a lot of controversy, including his VT on entering the house with comments which were perceived by many to be homophobic. This caused a number of complaints to Ofcom. Furthermore, on Day 3, his quoted comment about comparing same-sex adoption to "child abuse" drew widespread outrage and heavy criticism from his fellow housemates and host Emma Willis.

== Nominations table ==
	Day 2	Day 4	Day 7	Day 11	Day 15	Day 18	Day 23	Day 27	Day 32 Final		Nominations received
Scotty T	Winston	Winston	Stephanie, Nancy	Not eligible	Stephanie, Tiffany	No nominations	Tiffany, Stephanie	Gemma, Stephanie	Winner (Day 32)		2
Stephanie	Kristina	Winston	Gemma, Nancy	Danniella	Tiffany, John	No nominations	Not eligible	Danniella, Darren, John	Runner-up (Day 32)		13
Darren	Not eligible	Winston	Nancy, Angie	Not eligible	Tiffany, John	No nominations	Not eligible	Tiffany, Gemma	Third place (Day 32)		3
Tiffany	Not eligible	Winston	Kristina, Angie	Not eligible	Danniella, Jeremy	No nominations	Not eligible	Scotty T, Darren	Fourth place (Day 32)		11
Danniella	Not eligible	Winston	David, Angie	Not eligible	Tiffany, Stephanie	No nominations	Jeremy, Stephanie	Tiffany, Stephanie	Fifth place (Day 32)		4
John	Not eligible	Winston	Angie, Darren	Not eligible	Gemma, Megan	No nominations	Stephanie, Jeremy	Gemma, Stephanie	Sixth place (Day 32)		8
Gemma	Not eligible	Winston	Stephanie, Angie	John	John, Stephanie	No nominations	Jeremy, Stephanie	Stephanie, John	Evicted (Day 29)		9
Jeremy	Nancy	Nancy	Nancy, Angie	Tiffany	Tiffany, Gemma	No nominations	Not eligible	Evicted (Day 25)			6
Christopher	Not eligible	Winston	Nancy, Angie	Not eligible	Tiffany, Gemma	No nominations	Evicted (Day 22)				0
Megan	Not eligible	Winston	John, Nancy	Not eligible	John, Tiffany	Evicted (Day 18)					1
Kristina	Not eligible	Winston	Nancy, Angie	Not eligible	Evicted (Day 15)						3
Angie	Not eligible	Winston	Jeremy, Gemma	Kristina	Walked (Day 15)						8
David	Not eligible	Winston	Danniella, Gemma	Not eligible	Walked (Day 13)						1
Nancy	Not eligible	Nominated	Scotty T, Jeremy	Evicted (Day 11)							9
Jonathan	Not eligible	Winston	Walked (Day 7)								0
Winston	Not eligible	Nominated	Evicted (Day 4)								14
Notes	1		2	3	4	5	6	7	8		
Against public vote	Kristina, Nancy, Winston		Angie, Gemma, Jeremy, Nancy, Stephanie	Danniella, John, Kristina, Tiffany	Danniella, Gemma, Jeremy, John, Megan, Stephanie, Tiffany	Christopher, Danniella, Jeremy, John, Scotty T, Tiffany	Jeremy, Stephanie, Tiffany	Danniella, Gemma, Stephanie	Danniella, Darren, John, Scotty T, Stephanie, Tiffany		
Walked	none		Jonathan	David, Angie	none						
Evicted	Winston; 13 of 14 votes (out of 2) to evict		Nancy; Fewest votes to save	Kristina; Fewest votes to save	Megan; Fewest votes to save	Christopher; Fewest votes to save	Jeremy; Fewest votes to save	Gemma; Fewest votes to save	John; 2.33% (out of 6)	Darren; 17.85% (out of 3)	
Evicted	Winston; 13 of 14 votes (out of 2) to evict		Nancy; Fewest votes to save	Kristina; Fewest votes to save	Megan; Fewest votes to save	Christopher; Fewest votes to save	Jeremy; Fewest votes to save	Gemma; Fewest votes to save	Danniella; 7.02% (out of 5)	Darren; 17.85% (out of 3)	
Evicted	Winston; 13 of 14 votes (out of 2) to evict		Nancy; Fewest votes to save	Kristina; Fewest votes to save	Megan; Fewest votes to save	Christopher; Fewest votes to save	Jeremy; Fewest votes to save	Gemma; Fewest votes to save	Danniella; 7.02% (out of 5)	Stephanie; 26.57% (out of 2)	
Evicted	Winston; 13 of 14 votes (out of 2) to evict		Nancy; Fewest votes to save	Kristina; Fewest votes to save	Megan; Fewest votes to save	Christopher; Fewest votes to save	Jeremy; Fewest votes to save	Gemma; Fewest votes to save	Tiffany; 9.93% (out of 4)	Stephanie; 26.57% (out of 2)	
Evicted	Winston; 13 of 14 votes (out of 2) to evict		Nancy; Fewest votes to save	Kristina; Fewest votes to save	Megan; Fewest votes to save	Christopher; Fewest votes to save	Jeremy; Fewest votes to save	Gemma; Fewest votes to save	Scotty T 36.30% to win		

Notes

- ^Note 1: As a consequence of a task Jeremy, Scotty T and Stephanie were solely responsible for deciding who should face the first eviction. On Day 4, it was revealed that Kristina received the most votes to save. Following this, Nancy and Winston were subject to a house vote on who should be evicted. Nancy received just one vote to evict (from Jeremy), whilst Winston received the remaining thirteen votes to evict.
- ^Note 2: On Day 6, during a task, Tiffany won immunity from the next round of nominations and John was told he'd have to make his next nominations face-to-face.
- ^Note 3: On Day 11, eviction survivors Angie, Gemma, Jeremy and Stephanie had to give one killer nomination each.
- ^Note 4: These nominations were face-to-face. Everyone who received at least one nomination faced eviction.
- ^Note 5: Big Brother announced that there would be no nominations this week, instead all housemates would automatically face eviction unless they earn immunity. Gemma, Stephanie and Darren won immunity and the remaining housemates faced the public vote.
- ^Note 6: Only the "pure" housemates chosen by Gillian McKeith were required to give nominations.
- ^Note 7: On Day 26, Stephanie was allowed to make a killer nomination due to all other housemates breaking rules regarding discussing nominations.
- ^Note 8: This week the public were voting to win, rather than to save. The voting figures reflect the overall share of the final vote, and do not take into account the vote freezes between each position; due to rounding, the percentages do not perfectly add up to 100%. Scotty won with 57.75% of the vote to win over Stephanie.

== Summary ==
Day 1	Entrances	Gemma, John, Danniella, Christopher, Tiffany, Darren, Megan, Winston, David, Scotty T, Kristina, Jonathan, Angie, Stephanie, Jeremy, and Nancy entered the house.
Day 1	Twists	Upon entering the house, all the furniture had been boxed up with the housemates only having crates to sit on. After the first eight housemates entered, Big Brother asked the most decisive housemate to come forward and decide which two housemates should spend the first time in "The Box" without their possessions or luxuries. John volunteered himself and Darren to enter "The Box". Furthermore, John and Darren then had to decide which three of the remaining six housemates shouldn't have their suitcases delivered. They chose Christopher, Danniella and Winston. Following the arrival of the other eight housemates, John and Darren were given one last dilemma, a luxury food delivery for themselves or the kitchen to be unlocked for the remaining housemates outside "The Box". They chose to unlock the kitchen.; Later that night, Danniella was given the option to send one of her fellow housemates to "The Box" in exchange for the bedroom being unlocked. She chose to send herself to "The Box".
Day 2	Tasks	Housemates were asked to rank themselves from most to least annoying, where they chose Jeremy, Scotty T and Stephanie to be most annoying. Those three were then told they would be responsible for unlocking the rest of the house and for getting Danniella, Darren and John out of "The Box". They were given their own box of 1,500 keys and would have to find the one which would unlock their box which represented an area of the house. They all successfully unlocked the remaining areas of the house and "The Box".
Day 2	Nominations	Following their task, Jeremy, Scotty T and Stephanie were called to the Diary Room and told that they would be solely responsible for nominations this week and had to each choose a housemate who would definitely face the first eviction. Jeremy chose Nancy, Scotty T chose Winston, whilst Stephanie chose Kristina.
Day 3	Tasks	Housemates were split into two teams with each team's captain reading out a series of facts. Their team then had to decide which housemate from the opposite side matched each fact.
Day 3	Punishments	Winston was given a warning about his behaviour towards the women in the house.
Day 4	Twists	Kristina was told she had received the most public votes so is safe from eviction. It was then announced that the housemates would decide between Nancy and Winston whom to evict.
Day 4	Exits	Winston was evicted from the house, receiving 13 of 14 votes to evict.
Day 5	Tasks	David was asked to produce a talent show, choosing Jonathan, Nancy and Tiffany as the judges, Angie as the host, and the remaining housemates as the acts. At the end of the show, the judges voted Stephanie as the winner.
Day 6	Tasks	The housemates were asked to line up in front of a row of podiums containing presents and were told that their present could be ejected from its podium at any time over many hours. Each person that caught their flying present would receive what was inside. They were unaware that Jonathan had already secretly chosen who would get what present. During the task, Tiffany won immunity from the next eviction, Nancy won incarceration and John was told he would have to make his next nominations face-to-face.
Day 7	Exits	Jonathan walked from the house.
Day 7	Nominations	The housemates nominated for the first time. Angie, Gemma, Jeremy, Nancy and Stephanie received the most nominations and faced the public vote.
Day 8	Tasks	For the housemates' first shopping task they were split into puppets and puppeteers. Each 'Puppeteer' was responsible for a 'puppet' and they had to do a variety of challenges. Puppets were only permitted to eat food provided to them and had their beds replaced with boxes.
Day 9	Tasks	The puppet task continued. However, at the end of the task it was revealed they had failed. Big Brother then gave a lifeline giving the opportunity for either the puppeteers or the puppets to have a luxury shopping budget based on who pressed a button the quickest. The puppets were faster and therefore won the luxury budget.
Day 10	Punishments	Megan was issued a formal warning for her aggressive behaviour in an argument the previous night.; Tiffany was issued a warning for her aggressive behaviour used in an argument the previous night.
Day 10	Tasks	Housemates competed in a Lip Sync Battle challenge. Danniella, Kristina, David and Scotty T were the judges of the task, choosing winners from each pair's battle. The battles were Angie vs Nancy, Christopher vs John, Darren vs Tiffany, Gemma vs Megan and Jeremy vs Stephanie.
Day 11	Tasks	Housemates were split into two teams and had to try and work out which housemate the other group was describing by asking questions related to personality traits.
Day 11	Exits	Nancy was evicted from the house, receiving the fewest votes to save.
Day 11	Nominations	After surviving eviction, Angie, Gemma, Jeremy and Stephanie each had to give a killer nomination. They nominated Kristina, John, Tiffany and Danniella, respectively.
Day 12	Tasks	Housemates were split into two teams and given a task to balance a pair of scales with gunge. They were told that on each team there was a saboteur trying to make them fail. However, they were all told to be saboteurs. They successfully sabotaged the task and won a party. As Christopher and Gemma were identified as saboteurs they were not allowed to attend.
Day 13	Punishments	Stephanie was given a warning for threatening to punch Gemma the previous night.
Day 13	Tasks	Tiffany was given a secret task to spread rumours about her fellow housemates. She passed and won a pampering session, which she chose to share with Angie.
Day 13	Exits	David walked from the house on medical grounds.
Day 14	Tasks	The housemates were paired up for a dance competition with Kristina acting as judge. The pairs were chosen by Kristina; Christopher and Gemma, Danniella and Darren, Jeremy and Stephanie, John and Tiffany, and Megan and Scotty T. Kristina chose Jeremy and Stephanie as the winners.
Day 15	Exits	Angie walked from the house.; Kristina was evicted from the house, receiving the fewest votes to save.
Day 15	Nominations	For this round of nominations, the housemates were required to give nominations face-to-face. They were unaware that receiving one single nomination would mean they'd automatically face eviction. Danniella, Gemma, John, Jeremy, Megan, Stephanie and Tiffany all received one or more nominations and faced the public vote.
Day 16	Tasks	For the second shopping task the housemates had to "Just Go Along With It" to a number of random events that would happen in the house. This included exercise first thing in the morning, Christopher and Tiffany getting up close to jungle animals, and Jeremy babysitting twin dolls.
Day 17	Tasks	The housemates continued with their shopping task. This included Gemma and John being chosen by the public to go to jail, Darren and Scotty T attempting to get ducks into their pen, and housemates having to impersonate each other. At the end of the task Big Brother told housemates they'd passed the task.
Day 18	Exits	Megan was evicted from the house, receiving the fewest votes to save.
Day 18	Twists	Big Brother announced that there would be no nominations this week; instead all housemates would automatically face eviction unless they earn immunity. Gemma was the first housemate to win immunity during the first live challenge in "The Forgotten Theatre".
Day 19	Twists	For the second chance to win immunity, the housemates were all gathered to answer questions honestly about their fellow housemates. Stephanie became the second housemate to win immunity.
Day 20	Twists	Darren was the third and final housemate to win immunity from eviction having identified the most gruesome cocktails. This meant the remaining housemates; Christopher, Danniella, Jeremy, John, Scotty T and Tiffany would face the next eviction. At the end of the tasks, immune housemates were required to ban three housemates from being invited to the masquerade ball in "The Forgotten Theatre". Gemma chose to ban Christopher, Stephanie chose Tiffany, and Darren chose Danniella respectively.
Day 21	Tasks	John was given a secret task to earn compliments from each of his fellow housemates. However, unbeknownst to him, all the other housemates were on a secret mission of their own to sabotage his task by insulting him instead. The housemates passed the task and earned a coffee machine for the following day.
Day 22	Exits	Christopher was evicted from the house, receiving the fewest votes to save.
Day 22	Twists	Gillian McKeith entered the house as a guest and was given the task to detox the housemates. She selected Stephanie, Scotty T, John and Tiffany as the housemates whom she believed to be the "most toxic".
Day 23	Twists	After further observations and inspections in the detox process, Gillian reassessed the group and chose Stephanie, Tiffany, Jeremy and Darren as the new "most toxic" housemates.
Day 23	Nominations	Only the four "pure" housemates; Danniella, Gemma, John and Scotty T were able to give nominations. Jeremy, Stephanie and Tiffany received the most nominations and faced the public vote.
Day 24	Punishments	Stephanie was given a warning for her behaviour during an argument the previous night.
Day 24	Tasks	For the housemate's next shopping task, multiples phones were installed into the house which could ring at any time. The housemates were told that their friends and family would be on the other end of the phone and to pass the task they must identify who was on the other end by asking questions with "yes" or "no" answers. Once the housemates correctly identified who they were speaking to, that housemate was allowed to speak to their loved one. However, the housemates were only given a certain amount of talk time, which if they used more than the amount given, they'd fail the task.
Day 25	Tasks	The shopping task continued. As housemates finished with some talk-time remaining, they passed the task and won a luxury shopping budget.
Day 25	Exits	Jeremy was evicted from the house, receiving the fewest votes to save.
Day 26	Tasks	The housemates were bound together with locks and chains until further notice. To escape the chains, housemates must correctly guess who received the most and fewest votes in a series of public polls. At the end of the task, Danniella and Tiffany were the only housemates who failed to unlock themselves and missed out on the reward.
Day 26	Rewards	With all housemates except Stephanie discussing nominations, instead of punishments, Stephanie was given a reward. Stephanie was then asked to deliver a killer nomination. She chose Danniella, meaning she'd face the next eviction.
Day 27	Tasks	For Gemma's birthday, all other housemates were set a secret mission to sabotage her birthday in order to win her the "best birthday ever".
Day 27	Punishments	As Stephanie discussed nominations, Big Brother turned off all hot water and electrical appliances.
Day 28	Nominations	The housemates all nominated for the final time. Gemma and Stephanie received the most nominations and faced the public vote with Danniella.
Day 28	Tasks	Stephanie was asked to assign her housemates to a list of mini-task, where each would take part as quickly as possible. In order to pass the task, all seven housemates must complete their tasks in fifteen minutes or less. As Gemma refused to take part in her task, housemates failed.
Day 29	Exits	Gemma was evicted from the house, receiving the fewest votes to save.
Day 32	Exits	John left the house in sixth place, Danniella left the house in fifth place. Tiffany left the house in fourth place and Darren left the house in third place. It was then revealed that Scotty T was the winner, leaving Stephanie as the runner-up.

== Production ==
=== Sponsorship ===
Celebrity Big Brother 17 had no sponsorship, making it the first series of either Big Brother and Celebrity Big Brother not to have a sponsor since Celebrity Big Brother 1 in 2001.

=== House ===
A Channel 5 producer teased: "The famous house has undergone a major costume change, and housemates will be transported to a striking and theatrical setting which echoes the vaudeville theatres of a bygone era. The BB garden has been transformed into a Whitechapel style foggy street scene with a Victorian pub snug which will provide a hidden corner for sharing secrets and backstage backstabbing." Pictures of the new house were revealed on 18 December.

The House remains structurally similar to the previous series, however the kitchen and living area have swapped positions. What's more, the House has an old-age feel, with a Victorian pub-style kitchen area and theatre curtains down the staircase.

== Ratings ==
Official ratings are taken from BARB. The official ratings data for the episodes from 1 February 2016 to 5 February 2016 were not reported on the BARB website, it is unknown when or if this information will be released. The series average of 2.8 million is for the confirmed ratings

	Official viewers (millions)				
	Week 1	Week 2	Week 3	Week 4	Week 5
Saturday		1.90	2.13^{1}	2.39^{1}	2.39^{1}
Sunday		2.69	2.98	3.33	3.32
Monday		2.67	2.97	3.04	2.95
Tuesday	3.30	3.13	2.94	2.97	2.91
Wednesday	2.80	2.61	2.64	3.10	3.11
Thursday	2.70	2.95	3.09	3.20	3.02
Friday	2.30	2.91	2.95^{1}	3.25	3.01^{1}
Friday	2.32	2.19	2.68	3.04	3.01^{1}
Weekly average	2.69	2.63	2.80	3.04	2.96
Running average	2.69	2.66	2.70	2.79	2.82
Series average	2.82				
blue-coloured boxes denote live shows.

^{1}Ratings for these episodes do not include Channel 5 +1.
