= Freeze the Fear with Wim Hof =

British reality competition TV show

- Genre: Reality
- Directed by: Sabeh Bali; Alex Reynolds
- Presented by: Holly Willoughby; Lee Mack
- Starring: Wim Hof
- Country of origin: United Kingdom
- Original language: English
- No. of seasons: 1
- No. of episodes: 6

Production
- Executive producers: Dan Baldwin; Chantal Boyle; Olly Nash
- Producers: Sabeh Bali; Alex Reynolds; Joe Cummins; Emily Offord; James Pratt; Tom Wackett; Hannah Breheny; James Ellender
- Production location: Northern Italy
- Production company: Hungry Bear Media

Original release
- Network: BBC One
- Release: 12 April – 17 May 2022

Freeze the Fear with Wim Hof is a British reality television competition series presented by Holly Willoughby and Lee Mack. The series began broadcasting on BBC One on 12 April 2022.

The series follows eight celebrities who are trained by Dutch extreme athlete and motivational speaker Wim Hof, to complete a series of challenges in sub-zero temperatures that tests the participants both physically and mentally.

== Production ==
In August 2021, it was announced that the BBC had ordered a competition series by Wim Hof, to be presented by Holly Willoughby and Lee Mack. In March 2022, the series title Freeze the Fear with Wim Hof and the participants were announced.

The series is executive produced by Dan Baldwin for Hungry Bear Media, and is distributed by BBC Studios.

In January 2024 it was announced that the show was ending after just one series.

== Cast ==
=== Main ===
- Wim Hof
- Holly Willoughby
- Lee Mack

=== Participants ===
- Alfie Boe – English tenor and actor
- Chelcee Grimes – English singer, songwriter, television presenter, and footballer.
- Dianne Buswell – Australian dancer
- Gabby Logan – Welsh sport television presenter.
- Owain Wyn Evans – Welsh weather reporter
- Patrice Evra – French footballer
- Professor Green – English rapper
- Tamzin Outhwaite – English actress

== Spin-off ==
In March 2022, it was announced that a spin-off show called Munya and Filly Get Chilly would be aired alongside the series, presented by Munya Chawawa and Yung Filly on BBC Three. The show features behind-the-scenes content and interviews with the presenters and the participants of the series.
