= Fountain Studios =

Television studio in London, England 1929–2017

Wembley Park Theatre
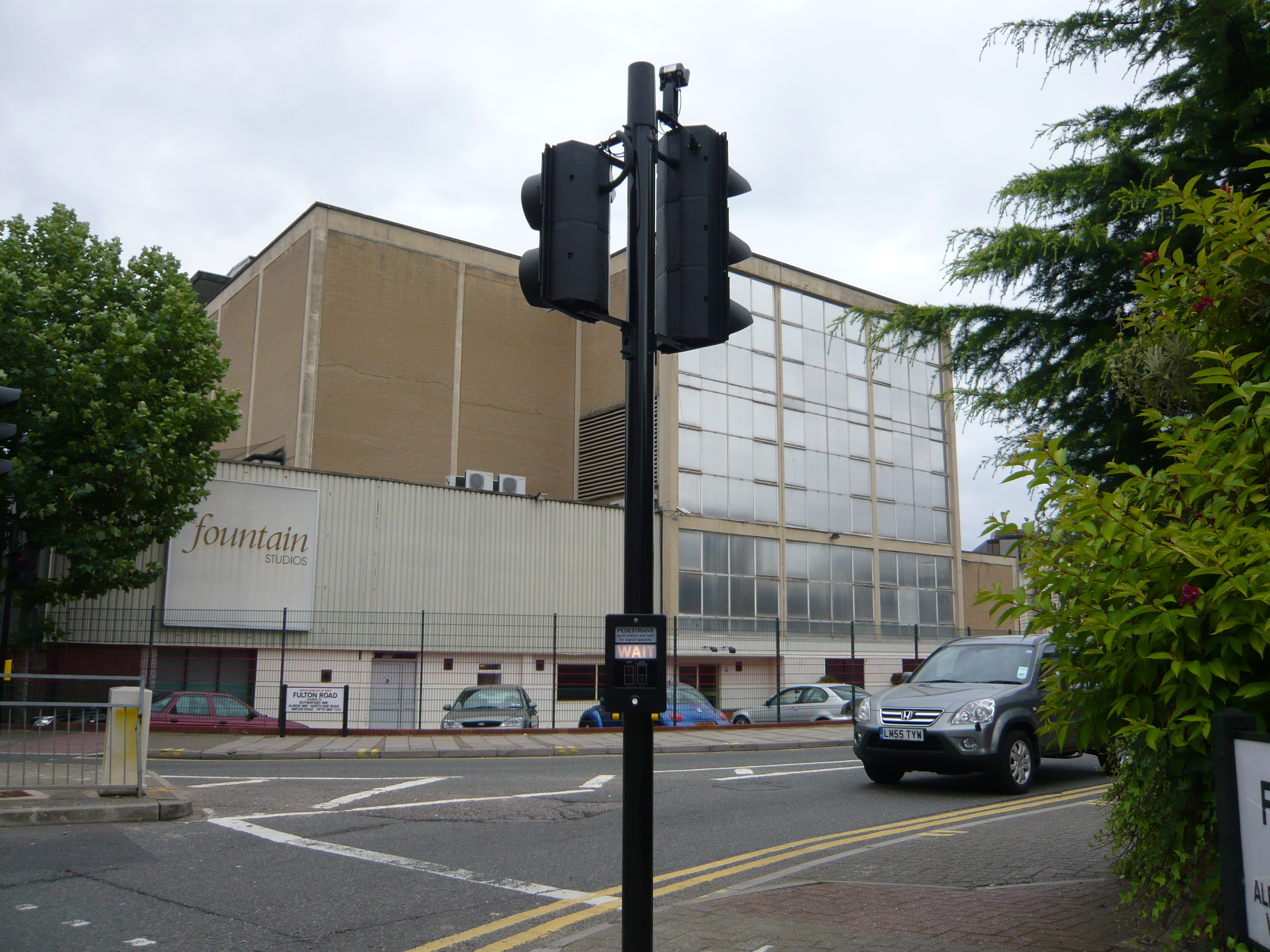
- Fountain Studios in 2008

- Location within Greater London Location within London Borough of Brent
- Former names: Wembley Film Studios (1929–1954); Wembley Studios (1955–1972); Lee International Film Studios (1977–1986); Limehouse Studios (1989–1992); Fountain Studios (1993–2016); Wembley Park Theatre (2017–present)

General information
- Type: Television studios
- Location: 128 Wembley Park Drive, Wembley, HA9 8HP, United Kingdom
- Coordinates: 51.5612°N 0.2818°W
- Current tenants: Wembley Park Theatre Ltd
- Opened: September 1929
- Renovated: 1993–1995
- Owner: Quintain Ltd
- Landlord: Quintain Ltd

Website
- Website

Fountain Studios was an independently owned television studio in Wembley Park, north-west London, England. The company was last part of the Avesco Group plc.

Several companies owned the site before it was bought by Fountain in 1993. Originally a film studio complex, as Wembley Studios it was formerly the base for the ITV London weekday franchise holder Rediffusion from 1955 to 1968, and London Weekend Television from 1968 to 1972. More recently, the studios were best known for being the venue for the live stages of ITV British shows The X Factor and Britain's Got Talent.

The last show to be broadcast live (and recorded) at the studios was The X Factor on 4 December 2016, after which the studio was closed, and the site sold to property developer Quintain. It is now known as Troubadour Wembley Park Theatre.

== History ==
In 1927, Ralph J. Pugh and Rupert Mason founded British Incorporated Pictures with the intention of creating an American-style studio complex in the former British Empire Exhibition's Palace of Engineering. They bought a lease at Wembley in June 1927, though it was for the Lucullus Garden Club Restaurant site, not the Palace of Engineering. Their financial backing fell through and in May 1928 the lease was sold to Victor Sheridan. Sheridan announced that £500,000 was to be spent on developing the biggest and best-equipped studio centre in Europe, British Talking Pictures engaged with Dynamics Corporation of New York to develop and supply a new improved Electromagnetic horn driver known as the Type 1 for its state of the art studio. Sheridan sold his lease to British Talking Pictures a few months later.

In September 1928, British Talking Pictures formed a subsidiary, British Sound Film Productions, to make films at Wembley. Wembley Studios was Britain's first purpose-built sound studios. Its three sound stages were officially opened in September 1929. Perhaps because of a major fire, the studio was never as successful as had been hoped. They were taken over by the American Fox Film Company, who leased the site and then bought it outright in 1936.

Fox used the studio for the production of their 'quota quickies'. A change in the law in 1938 led 20th Century Fox to use other studios, but it retained ownership. During the war the studios were leased to the military (the Army Kinematograph Service and RAF Film Unit), with intermittent rental to independents. Ealing Studios filmed Ships with Wings at Wembley in 1941. There was a fire at the studios in 1943.

In the 1950s the studios were used by Mercia Film Productions, who made feature films, and Rayant Pictures, who made shorts and adverts. The last film made at Wembley was Ealing Studios' The Ship That Died of Shame (US: PT Raiders, 1955).

Wembley Film Studio was taken over by Associated-Rediffusion, ITV's weekday broadcasters for London, in January 1955. Two of the existing studios were fully converted by the time commercial television began in September 1955, with the other two by the end of the year. An expansion on the site, the newly built Studio 5, opened in 1960. It was the largest television studio in Europe, and could be split into two parts for separate productions when required. The first production was An Arabian Night with Orson Welles. Shows such as Ready Steady Go!, No Hiding Place and Take Your Pick were to follow. During the 1960s the studios were home to some of the most popular programmes on the ITV network, including The Rat Catchers, Blackmail, At Last, The 1948 Show and The Frost Report. The Beatles appeared on more than one occasion at the studios.

When Associated-Rediffusion lost its weekday ITV franchise in 1968, the television studios entered a difficult period. For a time they became LWT's broadcast base and were used to record shows such as On the Buses, Please Sir! and Upstairs Downstairs. In 1972 LWT moved out, into its newly built South Bank Television Centre. In 1977, Wembley Studios became part of the Lee group being renamed Lee International Film Studios. The 1970s through to the 1990s saw the demise and demolition of the film studio complex and the decline of the television studios under many different owners, including Lee International and Trilion.

Fountain Television began its existence as a studio and post-production facility in New Malden, Surrey in 1985. After hosting shows such as Ready Steady Cook and Wizadora, the company took the opportunity to purchase the badly run-down Wembley site in 1993 for redevelopment.

Studio 5 (now known as Studio A & Studio B), is 14,000 sq ft (1,300 m^{2}) including the firelanes. An unusual feature of the studio is a soundproof double door which can be lowered in 30 minutes to reconfigure the space into two separate studios, each with its own independent control facilities. When used as a single studio, it was the largest fully equipped television studio in the UK – 500 sq ft (46 m^{2}) larger than HQ1 at Dock10, MediaCityUK in Salford and 2,000 sq ft (190 m^{2}) larger than Studio 1 at BBC Television Centre. Internationally, larger studios exist in Germany and in the United States, although many of these fall into the category of soundstages and are not fully-equipped television studios.

Fountain undertook the daunting task of the refurbishment and by 1994 the first shows began to trickle in. Hearts of Gold with Esther Rantzen, Talking Telephone Numbers and The Day Today were amongst the first shows to use Fountain's facilities.

Many high-profile productions were still produced at Fountain Studios up until its closure in February 2017; these include The X Factor, Play to the Whistle, 1000 Heartbeats and Britain's Got Talent.

=== Closure ===
In January 2016, it was confirmed that the studios had been sold for £16 million to a property developer, Quintain. The lease (at present up to eight years) for the site is still available and several parties have expressed an interest. The most likely use will be to retain the building and turn it into a 1,000-seat theatre and that may start after the decommissioning of the studio equipment for sale by auction in February 2017.

The site was leased from Quintain by Wembley Park Theatre Ltd in September 2017 for a 'meanwhile use' of the site until the site is demolished to make way for new developments. The duration of this use was for up to seven years as submitted by Quintain in November 2017.

The existing buildings to be repurposed on a temporary basis as an event space (primarily concentrating on theatrical use). The multi-functional venue will be predominantly focused on a main auditorium which will be designed for use in a number of layouts. This will be formed from the 1,340 m^{2} (14,400 sq ft) former studio space. In addition, various parts of the building will be used in a number of layouts and for a number of functions, including the former offices, restaurant, storage areas and car parks. Work started in September 2017 with minor modifications to the scene dock area and the addition of extra fire doors. It is expected that the first productions will start in the early part of 2018 Brent Council has various documents relating to the Theatre use.

London promoter LWE hosted a club night on 6 May 2018 featuring The Martinez Brothers headlining a Cuttin' Headz showcase. That was followed on 10 May 2018 by an appearance from Paul Kalkbrenner. Some photos of the current state at that time can be found online.

A press release was issued on 23 May 2018 stating that the studios would open in the latter half of 2018 as a flexible 1,000- to 2,000-seat theatre by Troubador Theatres (the same company that owns Wembley Park Theatre Ltd) as well as bar and restaurant.

=== Reopening ===
The venue reopened as Troubadour Wembley Park Theatre in 2019 as part of an urban redevelopment by Quintain Ltd which will include retail space and around 5,000 homes.

== Productions ==
=== Television ===
- Alan Davies Après-Ski (2014)
- At Last the 1948 Show (1967)
- Big Star's Little Star (2013–16)
- Bremner, Bird and Fortune (1999–2008)
- Britain’s Got Talent (2007–16)
- The British Comedy Awards (2011–14)
- Clone (2008)
- Cool for Cats (1956–61)
- The Cube (2009–15)
- Dara O Briain's Go 8 Bit (2016)
- The Dickie Henderson Show (1960–65)
- Do Not Adjust Your Set (1967–68)
- Doctor at Large (1971)
- Doctor on the Go (1975–77)
- Don't Try This at Home (1999)
- Double Your Money (1955–68)
- Educating Archie (1958–59)
- The Fenn Street Gang (1971–72)
- Friends (1998)
- Greed (2001)
- Harry Enfield's Television Programme (1990–92)
- Hearts of Gold (1995–96)
- MasterChef (1991)
- MTV Unplugged (1991)
- No Hiding Place (1959–67)
- Noel's HQ (2009)
- On the Buses (1969–72)
- Opportunity Knocks (1956)
- Our Man at St. Mark's (1963–66)
- Over the Rainbow (2010)
- Petrolheads (2006)
- Play to the Whistle (2015–16)
- Please Sir! (1968–72)
- Pop Idol (2001–03)
- The Rat Catchers (1966–67)
- Ready Steady Go! (1963–66)
- The Record of the Year (1998 - 2005)
- The Syndicate (2000)
- Take Your Pick! (1955–68)
- Talking Telephone Numbers (1994–97)
- Taskmaster (2016)
- Tuesday Rendezvous (1961–63)
- Upstairs, Downstairs (1971–72)
- The Voice UK: Battle Rounds (2012–13)
- Winning Lines (1999–2004)
- The Word (1990–92)
- World Idol (2003–04)
- Would I Lie to You? (2007)
- The X Factor (2004–16)
- You Bet! (1989)
- 1000 Heartbeats (2015–16)

=== Film ===
- The Awakening (1980)
- Brazil (1985)
- The Bridge (1985)
- The Elephant Man (1980)
- The Empire Strikes Back (1980)
- The Princess Bride (1987)
- Quadrophenia (1979)
- Silver Dream Racer (1980)
- Time Bandits (1981)
- Shock Treatment (1981)
- Yentl (1983)

=== Theatre ===
- Newsies (2022-2023)
- Starlight Express (2024-2026)
