= Take Off with Bradley & Holly =

British game show

- Genre: Game show
- Presented by: Bradley Walsh; Holly Willoughby
- Country of origin: United Kingdom
- Original language: English
- No. of series: 1
- No. of episodes: 5 (inc. 1 special)

Production
- Production location: BBC Elstree Centre
- Running time: 60 minutes
- Production company: Hungry Bear Media

Original release
- Network: BBC One
- Release: 24 December 2019 – 14 August 2021

Take Off with Bradley & Holly is a British television game show presented by Bradley Walsh and Holly Willoughby, and produced by Hungry Bear Media for the BBC. On the show, members of the public compete to win seats on a plane to a dream holiday destination.

The show was originally a one-off Christmas special that broadcast on 24 December 2019 on BBC One. In February 2020, the BBC announced that they had ordered a four episode series, which would begin airing on 24 July 2021 on BBC One.

The series was filmed before the COVID-19 pandemic and the related travel restrictions caused by the pandemic.

Reviewing the programme for the Daily Mirror, Ian Hyland described it as "a dreadfully dull format ... Saturday Night Takeaway on the cheap" and summarising its broadcast during the global pandemic as "surely the most ill-timed Saturday Night game show".
