= Beauty School Cop Outs =

- Genre: Reality
- Created by: MTV
- Starring: See below
- Country of origin: United Kingdom
- Original language: English
- No. of series: 1
- No. of episodes: 8

Production
- Running time: 42 minutes (excluding adverts)
- Production company: True North Productions

Original release
- Network: MTV
- Release: 29 October – 17 December 2013

Related
- Jersey Shore; Geordie Shore; The Valleys

Beauty School Cop Outs is a British reality television series based in Manchester, England and broadcast on MTV. The show premiered on 29 October 2013 and follows British and Irish young people as they move to a beauty school in Manchester to learn the tricks of the trade.

== History ==
The series was confirmed on 20 August 2013, and began airing on 29 October 2013 on MTV.

== Cast ==
The official cast members were announced on 24 September 2013. The cast features four boys; Calvin, Daniel, Jeremy and Richard, as well as four girls; Sacha, Savannah, Scarlett and Tara. Scarlett Moffatt later appeared on Channel 4's show Gogglebox alongside her parents, whilst Jeremy McConnell took part in the seventeenth series of Celebrity Big Brother.

Name	Age (at start of series)	Hometown
Calvin Lunt	23	Liverpool
Daniel Jarrousse	22	Wolverhampton
Jeremy McConnell Cooke	23	Dublin
Richard Cull	21	Pontypridd
Sacha Jones	18	Tipton
Savannah Jacqueline Kemplay	20	Leeds
Scarlett Sigourney Moffatt	22	County Durham
Tara Omidi	19	Oldham

=== Duration of cast ===
Series 1
Cast
Cast	1	2	3	4	5	6	7	8
Calvin								
Daniel								
Jeremy								
Richard								
Sacha								
Savannah								
Scarlett								
Tara								

=== Notes ===
Key: = Cast member is featured in this episode.
Key: = Cast member arrives in the house.
Key: = Cast member voluntarily leaves the house.
Key: = Cast member is removed from the house.
Key: = Cast member returns to the house.

=== Other appearances ===
As well as appearing in Beauty School Cop Outs, some of the cast members have competed in other reality TV shows including Celebrity Big Brother and I'm a Celebrity...Get Me Out of Here!.

- Celebrity Big Brother
  - Jeremy McConnell – series 17 (2016) – Eighth
- I'm a Celebrity...Get Me Out of Here!
  - Scarlett Moffatt – series 16 (2016) – Winner
- Married at First Sight
  - Sacha Jones – series 9 (2024)

== Series ==
Series	Location	Year	Ep #	Date	Viewers	Average MTV viewers	DVD release date
Series 1	Manchester, England	2013	1	29 October		—N/a	—N/a
Series 1	Manchester, England	2013	2	5 November	159,000	—N/a	—N/a
Series 1	Manchester, England	2013	3	12 November	139,000	—N/a	—N/a
Series 1	Manchester, England	2013	4	19 November	190,000	—N/a	—N/a
Series 1	Manchester, England	2013	5	26 November	143,000	—N/a	—N/a
Series 1	Manchester, England	2013	6	3 December	118,000	—N/a	—N/a
Series 1	Manchester, England	2013	7	10 December	144,000 (Excluding MTV+1)	—N/a	—N/a
Series 1	Manchester, England	2013	8	17 December	123,000 (Excluding MTV+1)	—N/a	—N/a
