= Wraparound (film and television media) =

Television or film segment used to frame or package other content

Wraparound, wraparound segment, or wraparound program (also styled wrap-around) is a term in film and television for short connecting media that either form a frame story (often around an anthology’s individual parts), hosts context for the primary media, or serves to package or bridge longer media using interstitials.

== Framing device ==
In narrative media, a wraparound (sometimes "wraparound tale") can be a narrative container that opens, links, and/or closes one or more stories. For example:

- Portmanteau films, particularly with a story within a story that connects otherwise standalone segments. For example, The V/H/S franchise
- Clip shows commonly employ a wraparound narrative, functioning as the episode’s flashback framing device
- Small changes for localized narrative; for instance Fraggle Rock was designed with modular human-world wraparound segments that could be re-shot with local casts, sets, and context; international versions replaced the American wraparounds featuring Doc and his dog Sprocket with locally produced inserts such as a lighthouse keeper in the U.K. and a retired baker in France. Wraparound content is limited scope, in contrast to hybrid off-market splicing or recombination which fundamentally changes the narrative in important ways, as with Power Rangers and Robotech.

== Interstitial programming ==
In broadcast theory, wraparound can also refer to interstitial; the “bits in between” programs (promos, trailers, idents, etc.), that are not diegetic story frames inside a program.

A wraparound can be brief non-narrative hosted or thematic interstitials that surround or bridge longer programming blocks. An example would be The Twilight Zone series creator Rod Serling’s on-camera introductions and closing narrations that bookend each episode, or sports and news outlets use wraparounds for studio shows that bookend live events. Short hosted bridges are also used to repackage films for alternate formats like cable and pay-per-view, with new content recorded by a host to introduce or contextualize the features. Wraparounds can additionally describe discussion blocks around a film or special.

Broadcasts of the National Football League in the United Kingdom have often featured additional studio analysis segments due to differences in commercial time between British and American television; in 2025, 5 introduced an entertainment-oriented pre-game and interstitial show known as NFL Big Game Night as part of its broadcasts, which have featured game show segments during portions of the game.
