= Scarlett Moffatt =

British television personality (born 1990)

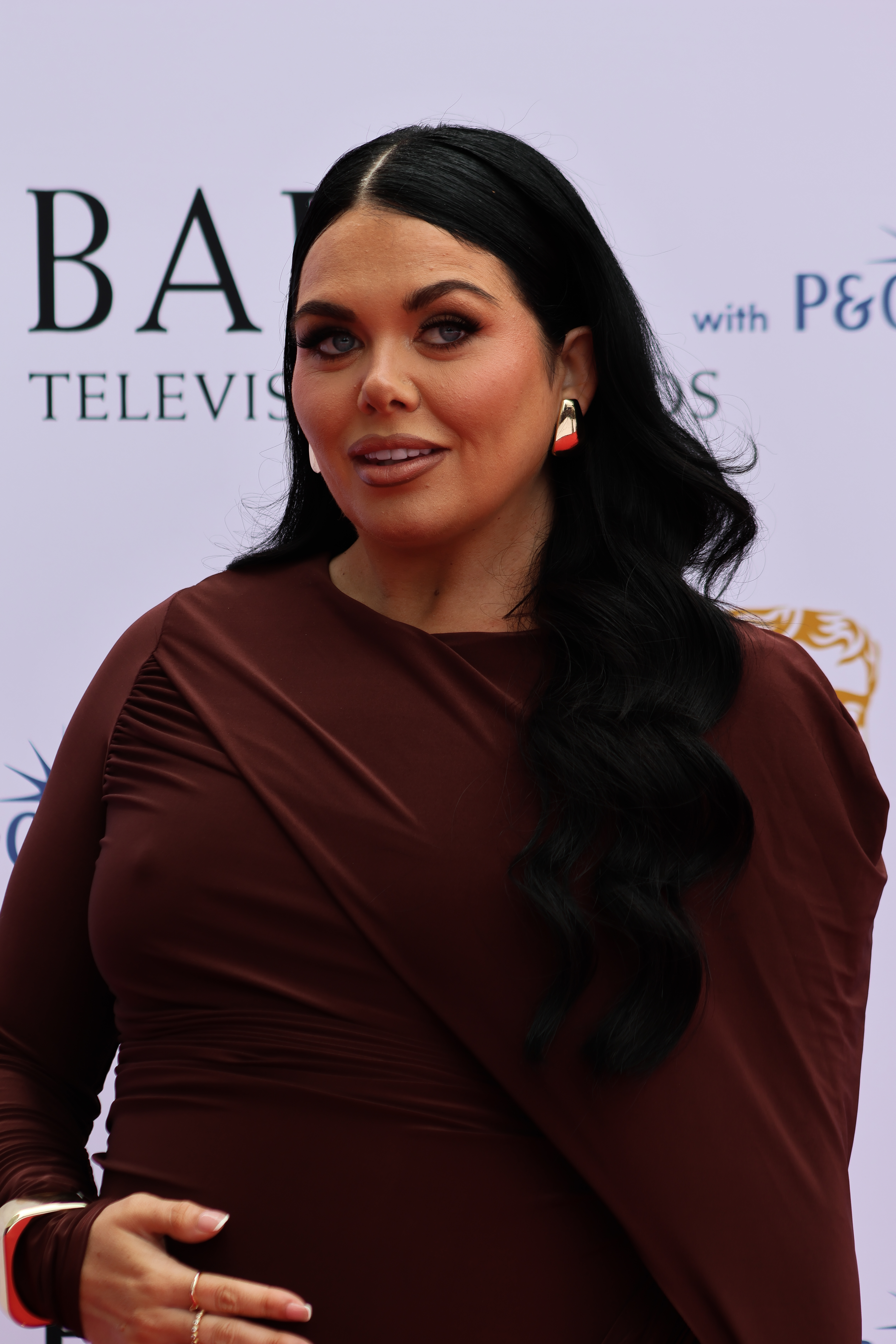
- Moffatt in 2026
- Born: Scarlett Sigourney Leigh Moffatt; 17 October 1990 (age 35); Bishop Auckland, County Durham, England
- Education: York St John University
- Occupations: Television presenter; television personality
- Years active: 2013–present
- Known for: Gogglebox; Ant & Dec's Saturday Night Takeaway; I'm a Celebrity: Extra Camp
- Television: Beauty School Cop Outs (2013); Gogglebox (2014–2016); Virtually Famous (2016–2017); Streetmate (2017); Ant & Dec's Saturday Night Takeaway (2017–2018); I'm a Celebrity: Extra Camp (2017–2018); I'm a Celebrity... South Africa (2026)
- Partner: Scott Dobinson
- Children: 2

Scarlett Sigourney Leigh Moffatt (born 17 October 1990) is a British television personality and presenter, best known for appearing in the Channel 4 programme Gogglebox. She won the sixteenth series of I'm a Celebrity...Get Me Out of Here! in 2016, and has since appeared in a number of programmes, including the I'm a Celebrity companion show Extra Camp as a co-presenter, and Ant & Dec's Saturday Night Takeaway.

== Career ==
On 23 September 2013, it was confirmed that Moffatt would be appearing in MTV's new series Beauty School Cop Outs, which follows British and Irish youngsters as they move to a beauty school in Manchester to learn the tricks of the trade.

In 2014, Moffatt became a regular cast member on the Channel 4 reality TV show Gogglebox alongside her parents Mark and Betty, making their debut in the third series in March 2014. Scarlett's younger sister Ava-Grace joined the family on the sofa during the seventh series; her then boyfriend Luke Crodden first appeared in the eighth series. Her relationship with Luke ended in March 2017. Moffatt has not appeared in Gogglebox since her appearance in I'm a Celebrity...Get Me Out of Here!

On 30 November 2015, Moffatt joined the presenting team for Capital Breakfast on Capital North East.

On 8 November 2016, it was confirmed that Moffatt would be participating in the sixteenth series of I'm a Celebrity...Get Me Out of Here!

After winning I'm a Celebrity...Get Me Out of Here! she began appearing as a panellist on Virtually Famous in December 2016. On 8 January 2017, it was announced that Channel 4 would be reviving dating show Streetmate with Moffatt as the presenter. "I can't believe Channel 4 have asked me to present this iconic show. I remember watching Davina McCall on Streetmate when I was younger and thinking, 'Females can present entertainment shows too. I want to do that when I'm older. It's such a fun show and it's two of my favourite things to do, chat to randomers and a love story." In January 2017, she was the backstage presenter for the National Television Awards.

On 9 January 2017, it was announced that Moffatt would be joining Ant & Dec on Ant & Dec's Saturday Night Takeaway. "I've watched Saturday Night Takeaway with my family for as long as I can remember, I'm such a huge fan, so to be part of one of the biggest entertainment shows out there, with two of my all-time TV heroes Ant and Dec, is an absolute dream." Moffatt said in a statement. On 19 November 2019 she was dropped from her role as co-presenter.

On 2 April 2018, Moffatt guest-hosted an evening radio show on Heart, as part of Heart's Feel Good Easter Weekend.

Since May 2020, Moffatt has presented a BBC Radio 1 podcast with her boyfriend Scott Dobinson, 'Scarlett Moffatt Wants to Believe'.

In 2022, Moffatt appeared alongside six other celebrities including Monty Panesar and Nick Hewer in the BBC television show Pilgrimage. In it, Moffatt and her fellow celebrities walked the route taken by Saint Columba from North Western Ireland to the Island of Iona in Scotland as he brought the Christian faith onto the UK mainland in the late 6th century AD. During the programme, she spoke of her Christian faith and how it helps her in her life.

In 2026, she was one of the 'All Stars' contestants in series 2 of I'm a Celebrity... South Africa, first aired on ITV on Easter Monday 6 April 2026.

== Personal life ==
Moffatt is named after the heroine Scarlett O'Hara, played by Vivien Leigh in Gone with the Wind (1939), her mother's favourite film, and her middle name is after Sigourney Weaver, who played Ellen Ripley in Alien (1979), her father's favourite film. Before finding fame, Moffatt worked as a checkout operator for Asda in her hometown of Bishop Auckland. She spent a year working at Student Loans (Darlington) answering phone calls regarding Disabled Students' Allowance. She is also an ex-ballroom and Latin dancer, and has danced in local, regional and national competitions. She studied sport at York St John University.

Moffatt has revealed she has failed her driving test a total of 13 times.

In 2022, Moffatt revealed she had become a practicing Anglican Christian after participating in the BBC's Pilgrimage series.

In 2023, Moffatt announced that she was pregnant with her first child. On 29 June 2023, she announced that she had given birth five weeks early to a son. The baby's father is Moffatt's boyfriend, Scott Dobinson. In April 2026, she announced that she was pregnant with the couple's second child.

== Filmography ==
Year	Show	Role	Note
2013	Beauty School Cop Outs	Cast member	
2014–2016	Gogglebox	Cast member	Series 3–8
2016	I'm a Celebrity...Get Me Out of Here!	Contestant	Series 16 winner
2016–2017	Virtually Famous	Team captain	
2017	22nd National Television Awards	Backstage presenter	
2017	Host the Week	Guest presenter	
2017	Streetmate	Presenter	1 series
2017–2018, 2024	Ant & Dec's Saturday Night Takeaway	Co-presenter	3 series
2017–2018, 2024	I'm a Celebrity: Extra Camp	Co-presenter	2 series
2018	The Chase Celebrity Special	Contestant	Christmas special
2019–present	CelebAbility	Team captain	3 series
2019	The British Tribe Next Door	Presenter	
2020	The Great Stand Up to Cancer Bake Off	Contestant	1 episode
2020	Joe Lycett's Got Your Back	Guest	1 episode
2020	Celebrity Catchphrase	Contestant	
2020	Celebrity Karaoke Club	Contestant	Season 1 winner
2020	Love Bites	Presenter	
2021	Who Wants to Be a Millionaire? Celebrity Special	Contestant	Series 37
2022	Pilgrimage: Road to Scottish Islands	Participant	Series 4
2022	Britain's Tourette's Mystery: Scarlett Moffatt Investigates	Presenter	Documentary
2023	Scarlett's Driving School	Herself	Documentary series
2023	Scared of the Dark	Contestant	
2025	Strictly Come Dancing	Herself	Winner; 2025 Christmas Special
2026	I'm A Celebrity South Africa	Herself	Series 2

=== Guest appearances ===
- Big Brother's Bit on the Side (20 August 2014)
- Virtually Famous (1 March 2016)
- Celebrity First Dates (15 July 2016)
- Play to the Whistle (4 April 2017)
- The Crystal Maze (30 June 2017)
- Celebrity Juice (23 March 2017)
- Sunday Brunch (20 August 2017)
- Sunday Brunch (6 November 2017)
- Room 101 (12 January 2018)
- Through the Keyhole (10 February 2018)
- Rob Beckett's Playing for Time (30 March 2018)
- Just Tattoo of Us (29 May 2018)
- Would I Lie to You? (2 November 2018)
- Richard Osman's House of Games (14–18 October 2019), champions week (2–6 December 2019) and Festive House of Games (Xmas Special)(26–30 December 2022)
- Trip Hazard: My Great British Adventure (9 April 2021)

Preceded by Vicky Pattison	I'm a Celebrity... Get Me Out of Here! Winner & Queen of the Jungle; 2016	Succeeded by Georgia Toffolo
