= Paradiso Girls =

Girl group

- Origin: London, England
- Genres: Pop; dance-pop; R&B
- Years active: 2007–2010
- Label: Interscope
- Spinoff of: The Pussycat Dolls
- Past members: Aria Crescendo; Lauren Bennett; Kelly Beckett; Shar Mae Amor; Chelsea Korka

The Paradiso Girls were a girl group created by Robin Antin, and were a European spin-off of Antin's other girl group The Pussycat Dolls. The members came from different countries: Chelsea Korka from the United States, Aria Crescendo from France, Lauren Bennett and Kelly Beckett from the United Kingdom and Shar Mae Amor from the Philippines. They were signed to Interscope Records. Their debut single "Patron Tequila" featuring Lil Jon and Eve was released on May 12, 2009 and reached position 3 on the Billboard Hot Dance Club Play. Following uncertainty from their label, the group disbanded in 2010.

== History ==
=== 2007–2008: Formation ===
Jimmy Iovine, owner of Interscope Records, decided to create a new girl group after meeting French singer and former Star Academy yoga teacher Aria Crescendo. Together with Robin Antin, Martin Kierszenbaum and will.i.am, he auditioned over 500 girls in London, some of which had been noticed during The X Factor UK auditions, casting six of them including singer Lauren Bennett, singer/dancer Kelly Beckett, as well as rapper/singer Shar Mae Amor. Chelsea Korka was the runner-up on the first season of the CW reality competition series Pussycat Dolls Present. Each girl represented a different country and the group had no lead singer, unlike The Pussycat Dolls. The group, cut down to a quartet, was then featured in a remix of "I Got It from My Mama" by will.i.am.

The group was then first revealed by Korka and Antin at the CW Upfronts 2008.

=== 2009–2010: Debut, departure from label and disbandment ===
After two years of production, the group finally released its first official single, "Patron Tequila" featuring Eve and Lil' Jon on iTunes on April 14, 2009. The song was intended as the lead single from their to-be debut album entitled Crazy Horse. As promotion, the group was featured on various songs by Space Cowboy and made appearances in numerous events including the Party Rock Tour, which featured many new artist from their label, TV shows, blogs and magazines They have also modeled for Beats By Dre. In 2010, their second single called "Who's My Bitch" was released digitally on June 22, 2010 with a music video, shot from April 7–8, 2010 which had appeared on YouTube and MySpace on June 5, 2010. Unlike the previous single, it performed poorly on the charts and the group did no promotions for the song.

Following the poor performance of the second single, numerous rumors of disbandment began to circulate the internet after some members began to remove the word “Paradiso” from their Twitter names, although member Shar Mae Amor stated in an interview on UStream that the group was preparing for a third single while Lauren Bennett stated that the album is already finished and that the group is just waiting for their record label to set a release date. However, Interscope Records did not release an official statement explaining the status of the group.

The fate of the group was then put to question when a brief disagreement broke out between band members Aria Crescendo and Chelsea Korka on Twitter, after Korka tweeted that the group was still together but that each band member would be pursuing their own projects for the time being. A frustrated Crescendo then replied to her tweet by saying "why are you confusing the fans ????????? u know the troth Chealsea so stop pretending .......be truthful to ur hart for once".

On October 27, 2010, band member Aria Crescendo made an unofficial confirmation that the group was dropped by Interscope Records through an online interview hosted by popChamber via Vimeo. In the interview, she expressed disappointment that the group had a severe lack of promotion in return for the efforts put in by each of the band members for the last two years. She has also confirmed that their highly anticipated debut album will no longer be released. It was revealed that they had apparently recorded over 50 songs for this album, including a song called "Bad Man" featuring Will.i.am.

== Discography ==
=== Singles ===
Year	Single	Chart Positions
Year	Single	US Dance
2008	"Wow"	–
2009	"Patron Tequila" (featuring Lil Jon and Eve)	3
2010	"Who's My Bitch"	28

=== Collaborations ===
Year	Single	Peak chart positions		Album
Year	Single	GER	SWE	Album
2009	"Falling Down" (Space Cowboy featuring Chelsea Korka)	63	27	Digital Rock Star
2009	"I Came 2 Party" (Space Cowboy featuring Paradiso Girls)	—	—	Digital Rock Star
2009	"Get U Home" (Shwayze featuring Aria)	—	—	Let It Beat

=== Music videos ===
Year	Song	Director
2009	"Patron Tequila" (featuring Lil Jon and Eve)	Ray Kay
2009	"Falling Down" (Space Cowboy featuring Chelsea Korka)	The Party Rock Crew
2010	"Who's My Bitch"	Chris Sims
