= Interstitial television show =

Short program to be shown between longer television airings

In television programming, an interstitial television show is a form of wraparound segment shown between movies or other events, e.g. cast interviews after movies on premium channels. It can also describe short bridges within a program, such as the live-action introductions in Disney's 1940 film Fantasia.

Sometimes, if a program finishes earlier than expected, a short extra program may be inserted in the schedule to fill the time until the next scheduled program is due to start. American cable channel TBS commonly aired TV's Bloopers & Practical Jokes after shorter-than-average Braves games.

For American telecasts of the film The Wizard of Oz between 1959 and 1968, celebrity hosts appeared in wraparound segments. Opening credits specially designed by the network were shown in CBS's own format, followed by the host's first appearance, in which he made comments (often humorous, though never derogatory) about the film. Immediately following this, and without a commercial pause, the film itself would begin with all of its original 1939 opening credits. Halfway through the picture, the host would reappear and introduce the second half of the film. When the film ended, however, its closing credits would not be shown in their original format. Instead, the host would appear once more, bid farewell to the viewing audience, and the closing credits would be shown in CBS's own format.

Among the notable interstitial programs shown between or during Saturday morning cartoons in the United States were In the News, shown on CBS starting in 1971, and Schoolhouse Rock!, shown on ABC starting in 1973.

Raidió Teilifís Éireann in the Republic of Ireland used a variety of material as interstitials; often animation, including Roger Mainwood's video of Kraftwerk's hit Autobahn, Halas and Batchelor shorts, and stop-motion Soviet cartoons; also rhythmic gymnastics performances, instrumental music, or sometimes simply a test card.

Japan's national public broadcasting organization NHK's Minna no Uta is something of a national institution, commissioning makers of usually animated films and famous or upcoming music acts to collaborate on exclusive music videos used to plug schedule gaps in lieu of advertisements.

In Canada, short film series such as Canada Vignettes, Hinterland Who's Who, and Heritage Minutes were often used on CBC Television and other broadcasters.

In Australia, it is common for the Australian Broadcasting Corporation (ABC) to play these as the ABC is government-funded and doesn't need as much time for commercial breaks. This means that TV shows made for commercial networks finish earlier and not on the hour.

== See also ==
- Wraparound (film and television media)
- Bumper (broadcasting)
- Segue
- Dead air
- Flow (television)
- Filler (media)
