= Efe Obada =

British-Nigerian gridiron football player (born 1992)

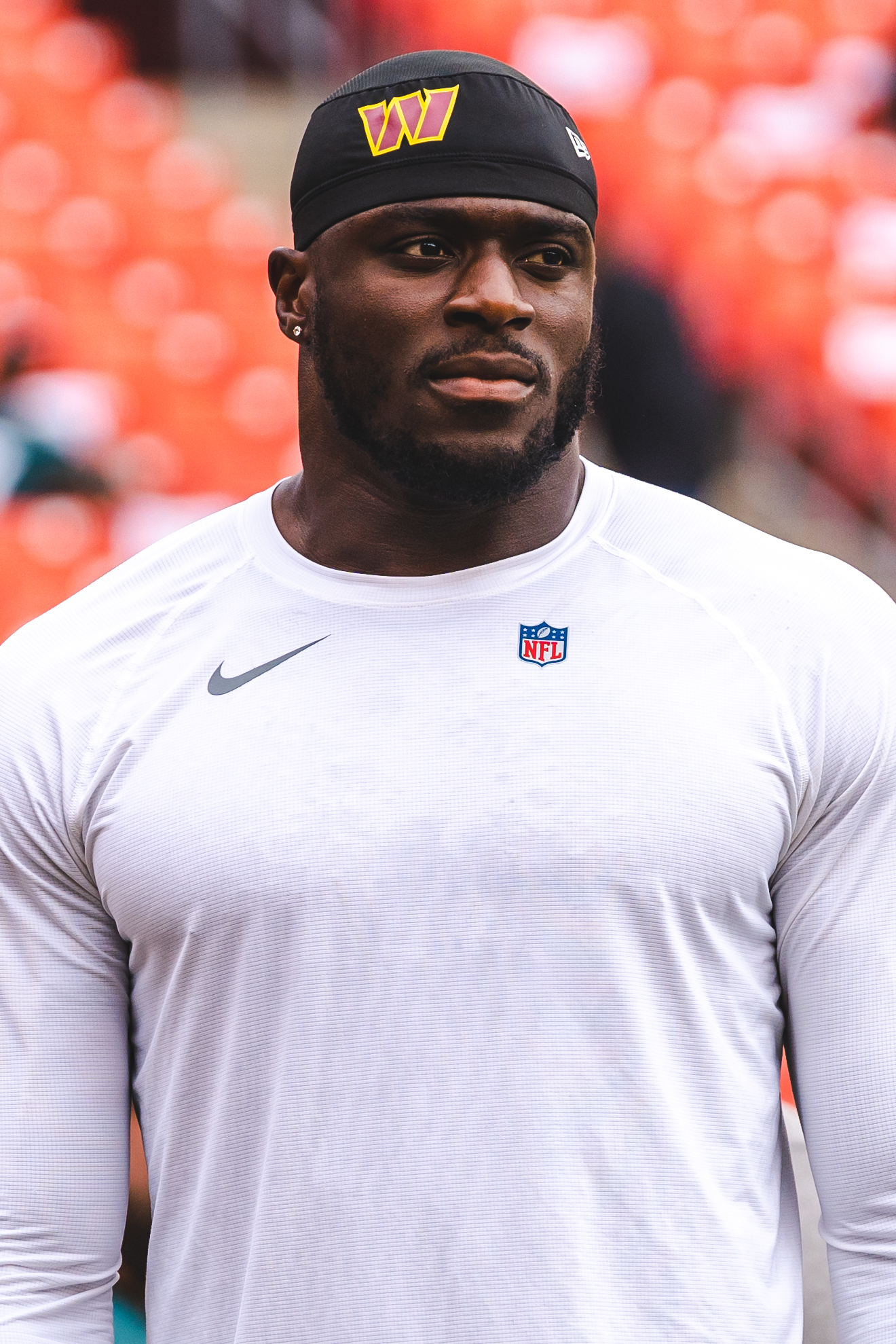
- Obada in 2022

Profile
- Position: Defensive end

Personal information
- Born: 13 April 1992 (age 34); Lagos, Nigeria
- Listed height: 6 ft 6 in (1.98 m)
- Listed weight: 265 lb (120 kg)

Career information
- NFL draft: 2015: undrafted

Career history
- London Warriors (2014); Dallas Cowboys (2015)*; Kansas City Chiefs (2016)*; Atlanta Falcons (2016)*; Carolina Panthers (2017–2020); Buffalo Bills (2021); Washington Commanders (2022–2024)
- * Offseason or practice squad member only

Career NFL statistics
- Tackles: 92
- Sacks: 15
- Pass deflections: 6
- Interceptions: 1
- Forced fumbles: 1
- Fumble recoveries: 2
- Stats at Pro Football Reference

Efe Obada (born 13 April 1992) is a British-Nigerian former professional player of American football who was a defensive end in the National Football League (NFL). He first played at an amateur level for the London Warriors of the BAFA National Leagues, later for the NFL's Dallas Cowboys, Kansas City Chiefs, Atlanta Falcons, Carolina Panthers, Buffalo Bills, and Washington Commanders.

== Early life ==
Obada was born on 13 April 1992, in Lagos, the economic and entertainment capital of Nigeria. He and his family later moved to the Netherlands. At the age of 10, he and his sister were trafficked into London, and were left homeless when they arrived. They initially slept in an office block before living in 10 different foster homes. He eventually began work as a security guard at Grace Foods in Welwyn Garden City.

Obada joined the London Warriors of the BAFA National Leagues in 2014, where he played in five games as a tight end and defensive end.

== Professional career ==
=== Dallas Cowboys ===
Based on a recommendation from Warriors defensive coordinator Aden Durde, who previously served as an intern coach with the Dallas Cowboys, Obada was given the opportunity to work out for the team days before the Cowboys' game against the Jacksonville Jaguars in London. Although he did not have much experience, he was signed on 1 April 2015. In rookie mini-camp, he was tried on the first days at tight end, before the team decided to move him to defensive end, where the learning curve would not be as steep. He was waived on 5 September. On 23 September 2015, he was signed to the Cowboys' practice squad. He was released on 7 October but rejoined the practice squad on 2 December. He was waived on 2 March 2016.

=== Kansas City Chiefs ===
Obada was signed by the Kansas City Chiefs on 9 March 2016. He was released by the team on 7 June.

=== Atlanta Falcons ===
On 28 July 2016, he was signed by the Atlanta Falcons. He was waived by the Falcons on 27 August.

=== Carolina Panthers ===
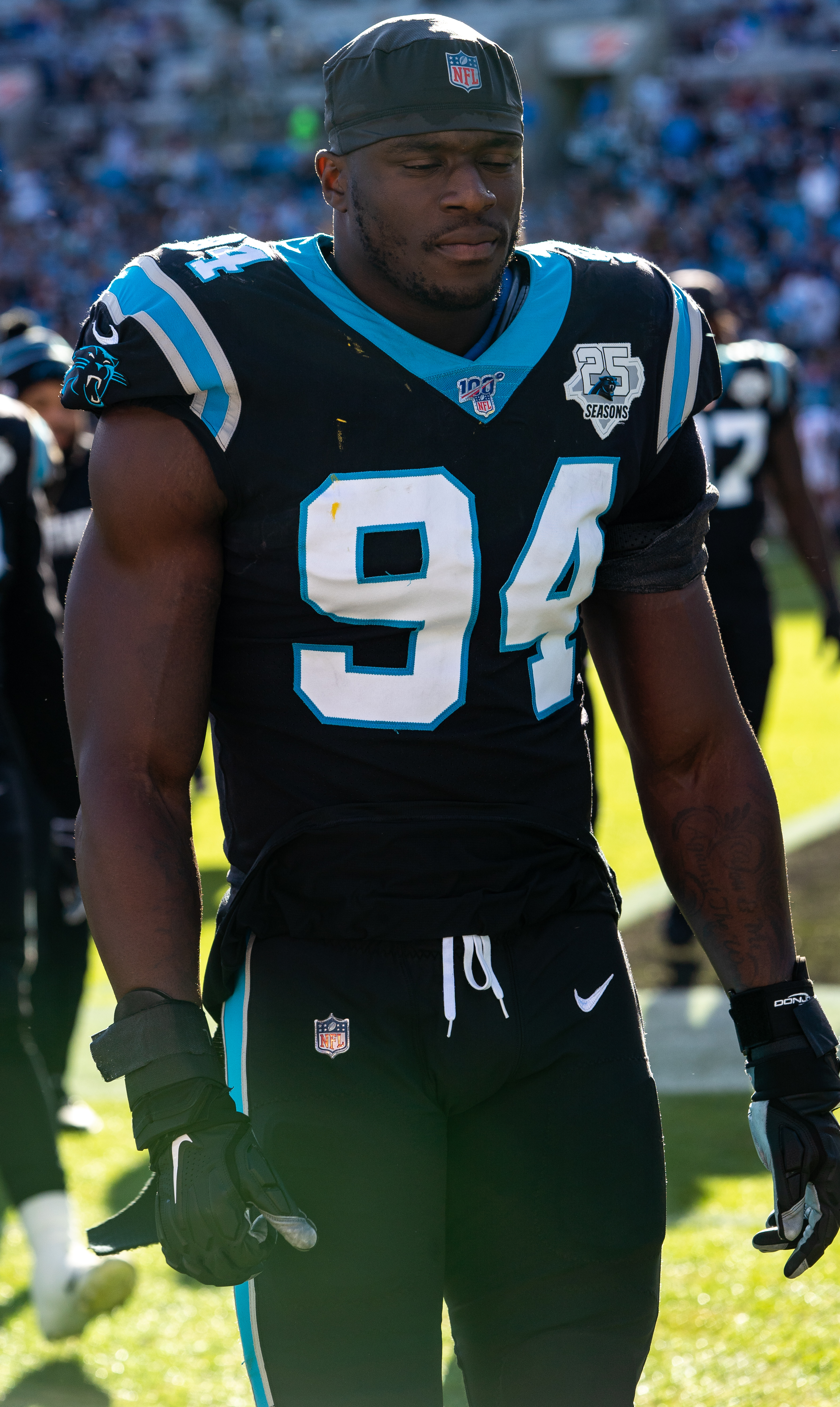
Obada with the Carolina Panthers in 2019

On 25 May 2017, Obada was signed by the Carolina Panthers through the NFL's International Player Pathway Program. He was waived by the Panthers on 1 September, and was re-signed to the practice squad. Obada signed a reserve/future contract with the Panthers on 8 January 2018. After a strong preseason, Obada became the first player from the NFL International Player Pathway program to make a 53-man roster. In Week 3, against the Cincinnati Bengals, Obada played his first regular season game, where he had one sack and one interception. He was later awarded the game ball, and was named the NFC Defensive Player of the Week. He finished the season with eight combined tackles and two sacks.

On 23 January 2019, Obada signed a one-year contract extension with the Panthers. On 13 October, Obada was made an honorary captain for the Panthers' NFL London Game vs. the Tampa Bay Buccaneers at Tottenham Hotspur Stadium as part of a very emotional day for him. On 6 January 2020, Obada signed a one-year contract extension with the Panthers. He was waived on 6 September 2020, but re-signed with the team the next day. In Week 3 of the 2020 season against the Los Angeles Chargers, Obada recovered a fumble lost by wide receiver Keenan Allen on the last play of the game to secure a 21–16 win for the Panthers.

=== Buffalo Bills ===
On 19 April 2021, Obada signed a one-year deal with the Buffalo Bills. He recorded 3.5 sacks with 12 tackles in 10 games.

=== Washington Commanders ===
Obada signed a one-year deal with the Washington Commanders on 23 March 2022. He re-signed with the team on another one-year contract on 20 March 2023. On 31 August, he was placed on injured reserve due to a knee injury. Obada was reactivated to the active roster on 14 October. In the team's Week 11 game, Obada was carted off the field due to multiple leg fractures and underwent surgery the next day. On 20 November, he was placed on injured reserve.

On 14 March 2024, Obada re-signed with the Commanders on another one-year contract. He placed on physically unable to perform before the season opener and was activated on 12 October. Obada was released on 5 November and re-signed with their practice squad the following day.

=== Retirement ===
Having been without a team in the 2025 season, Obada officially announced his retirement on 12 August 2026. Coinciding with his retirement, Obada was announced as club ambassador of the London Guard, an expansion team for the European Football Alliance.

== NFL career statistics ==
Legend
**Bold**	Career high

Year	Team	Games		Tackles				Interceptions						Fumbles			
Year	Team	GP	GS	Cmb	Solo	Ast	Sck	Int	Yds	Avg	Lng	TD	PD	FF	FR	Yds	TD
2018	CAR	10	0	8	6	2	2	**1**	0	0	0	0	**2**	0	0	0	0
2019	CAR	16	0	**24**	**14**	**10**	0	0	0	0	0	0	1	0	0	0	0
2020	CAR	16	1	18	10	8	**5.5**	0	0	0	0	0	0	**1**	**2**	**54**	0
2021	BUF	10	1	12	8	4	3.5	0	0	0	0	0	1	0	0	0	0
2022	WAS	17	1	**24**	**14**	**10**	4	0	0	0	0	0	**2**	0	0	0	0
2023	WAS	3	0	2	1	1	0	0	0	0	0	0	0	0	0	0	0
Career		72	3	88	53	35	15	1	0	0	0	0	6	1	2	54	0
