= Streetmate =

- Genre: Reality dating game show
- Presented by: Davina McCall (1998–2001, 2016); Holly Willoughby (2007); Scarlett Moffatt (2017)
- Country of origin: United Kingdom
- Original language: English
- No. of series: 5
- No. of episodes: 66 (inc. 5 specials)

Production
- Running time: 30 minutes (Channel 4); 60 minutes (ITV2)
- Production company: Tiger Aspect Productions

Original release
- Network: Channel 4
- Release: 30 October 1998 – 9 March 2001
- Network: ITV2
- Release: 27 September – 29 November 2007
- Network: Channel 4
- Release: 21 August – 8 September 2017

Streetmate is a reality dating game show that first aired on Channel 4 from 30 October 1998 to 9 March 2001, hosted by Davina McCall, and then aired on ITV2 from 27 September to 29 November 2007, this time hosted by Holly Willoughby. The series returned to Channel 4 in 2017, instead hosted by Scarlett Moffatt.

== History ==
A spin-off version called Beachmate aired for 5 episodes in 2001 hosted by Tania Strecker.

Two special editions of the show have aired for charity: the first was a celebrity episode with Emma Bunton and Brian Dowling for Comic Relief on 14 March 2003; the second was for Stand Up to Cancer UK on 21 October 2016. This mini episode featured First Dates star Fred Sirieix.

== Format ==
The host picks an eligible male or female from the streets, and then with their help, they approach equally eligible members of the opposite/same sex for a date. The couple will then go on a date and then report if it was a success or a failure.

However, for the 2017 series, the first person looking for a partner was already chosen.

== Transmissions ==
=== Original ===
Series	Start date	End date	Episodes	Channel	Presenter
1	30 October 1998	29 January 1999	10	Channel 4	Davina McCall
2	1 September 1999	15 December 1999	12	Channel 4	Davina McCall
3	5 January 2001	9 March 2001	9	Channel 4	Davina McCall
4	27 September 2007	29 November 2007	10	ITV2	Holly Willoughby
5	21 August 2017	8 September 2017	15	Channel 4	Scarlett Moffatt

=== Beachmate ===
Series	Start date	End date	Episodes	Channel	Presenter
1	13 April 2001	11 May 2001	5	Channel 4	Tania Strecker

=== Specials ===
Date	Entitle	Channel	Presenter
17 December 1999	Streetmate Refried	Channel 4	Davina McCall
22 December 1999	Skimate	Channel 4	Davina McCall
4 August 2000	Caribbeanmate	Channel 4	Davina McCall
14 March 2003	Comic Relief Special	BBC One	Davina McCall
21 October 2016	Stand Up to Cancer Special	Channel 4	Davina McCall
