= Hungry Bear Media =

UK television production company

Hungry Bear Media Limited
- Type: Private
- Industry: Production company
- Founded: January 6, 2014; 12 years ago in London, United Kingdom
- Founder: Dan Baldwin; Juliet Denison-Gay
- Headquarters: Hammersmith, London, United Kingdom
- Key people: Dan Baldwin (CEO) Juliet Denison-Gay (Creative director)
- Owners: Dan Baldwin
- Website: hungrybearmedia.co.uk

Hungry Bear Media Limited is a British television production company founded in 2014 by Dan Baldwin and Juliet Denison-Gay.

== History ==
In 2014, Hungry Bear Media was founded by television executive Dan Baldwin and television executive Juliet Denison-Gay.

In January 2015, the company entered a first-look deal with distributor Sky Vision, a subsidiary of Sky.

== Filmography ==
=== Current ===
- Michael McIntyre's Big Show (2015–2019, 2023–present)
- Bradley & Barney Walsh: Breaking Dad (2019–present)
- The Wheel (2020–present)
- Gladiators (2024–present)
- Gladiators: Epic Pranks (2025–present)
- NFL Big Game Night (2025–present)
- Holly Willoughby Together (2026–present)

=== Former ===
- Dapper Laughs: On the Pull (2014)
- Virtually Famous (with Talkback) (2014–2017)
- Reality Bites (2015)
- 1000 Heartbeats (2015–2016)
- Play to the Whistle (2015–2017)
- Alan Carr's Happy Hour (with Travesty Media) (2016)
- FHM: The Last of the Lads' Mags (2016)
- Debatable (2016–2017)
- All Round to Mrs. Brown's (with BOC-PIX) (2017–2020)
- Whiplashed (2018)
- The Greatest TV Moments of All Time (2018)
- For Facts Sake (with BOC-PIX) (2018)
- Judge Romesh (2018–2019)
- Re-Play 2018 with Richard Osman (with Mitre Television) (2018)
- Romesh's Look Back To The Future (2018–2019)
- Bradley Walsh's Late Night Guestlist (2019)
- Take Off with Bradley & Holly (2019, 2021)
- Michael McIntyre: Showman (2020)
- Freeze the Fear with Wim Hof (2022)
- Munya and Filly Get Chilly (2022)
- David & Jay's Touring Toolshed (2024)
