= Patron Tequila (song) =

Single by Paradiso Girls featuring Lil Jon and Eve

from the album Crazy Horse (shelved)
- Released: April 14, 2009
- Recorded: 2008
- Genre: Dance-pop; crunk; hip-hop; R&B
- Length: 3:57
- Label: Interscope
- Songwriters: Jason Perry; Jonathan Smith; Esther Dean; Jamal Jones
- Producer: Polow da Don

Paradiso Girls singles chronology
"Patron Tequila" (2009)	"Who's My Bitch" (2010)

Lil Jon singles chronology
"Let Me See the Booty" (2008)	"Patron Tequila" (2009)	"Shots" (2009)

Eve singles chronology
"Give It to You" (2007)	"Patron Tequila" (2009)	"Who's That Girl" (2010)

"Patron Tequila" is the debut single by the girl group Paradiso Girls, released on April 14, 2009. It features guest vocals from American rappers Lil Jon and Eve, both of whom co-wrote the song with Ester Dean, Jason Perry, and Polow da Don; the latter produced the song. The song was intended for inclusion on their debut studio album, Crazy Horse, which was ultimately unreleased.

The Remixes and The Remixes Part 2 were released to further promote the song.

== Background and history ==
The song was originally performed by Keri Hilson, Lil Jon and T-Pain for Hilson's debut studio album In a Perfect World.... However, at the last minute before her album's turn in date, the song was given to the Paradiso Girls. The group recorded the song and made several alterations. Lil Jon's verse was omitted whilst T-Pain was replaced with US rapper Eve.

The song was released in the US on April 14, 2009 as a CD Single and digital download, along with a release in Canada. The girls promoted the song throughout October 2009 in Canada.

== Reception ==
The song was given mainly positive reviews. Many online sites created a "Who Did It Better?" poll, comparing the Paradiso version to the Hilson version. The song was named MuuMuse's "Summer Jam of 2009".

== Music video ==
The music video, directed by Ray Kay, was shot over a three-day process in May 2009. It opens with a man purchasing Dr. Dre Beats headphones from a Best Buy store after hearing the beat to Patron Tequila through them. Each member of the band is featured in a different location, flirting with the man: Aria on a bus, Chelsea filling her car with gas, Lauren paying at the checkout, Kelly in the gas station shop and Shar sitting at the bus stop. The girls are also in the club where Eve raps along with Lil Jon. They also dance in front of a white backdrop. Clips are interspersed of the man dreaming about the girls being in the club but coming back to reality every now and again. The video premiered on Yahoo on June 15, 2009.

There is an alternative uncensored version of the video containing new scenes and the explicit version of the song.

== Track listings ==
Digital download

1. "Patron Tequila"

Patron Tequila Remixes Part I

1. "Patron Tequila (Dave Audé Club Remix) (featuring Lil Jon) — 07:48
2. "Patron Tequila (DJ Dan Club Remix) (featuring Lil Jon) — 05:19

Patron Tequila Remixes Part II

1. "Patron Tequila (This/Is Remix)" (featuring Lil Jon) — 04:19
2. "Patron Tequila (StoneBridge Remix)" (featuring Lil Jon) — 06:45

Vanguards Remix Single

1. "Patron Tequila" (Vanguards Remix) (featuring Pitbull & Lil Jon)

== Chart performance ==
Chart (2009)	Peak position
Canada Hot 100 (Billboard)	82
US Heatseekers Songs (Billboard)	39
US Dance Club Songs (Billboard)	3
US Hot Dance/Electronic Songs (Billboard)	30
US Rhythmic Airplay (Billboard)	27

== Release history ==
Region	Date	Label	Format
Canada	April 14, 2009	Interscope	Digital download, CD single
United States	April 14, 2009	Interscope	Digital download, CD single
