= Play to the Whistle =

- Genre: Sports comedy panel game
- Presented by: Holly Willoughby
- Starring: Bradley Walsh; Frank Lampard; Romesh Ranganathan; Seann Walsh; Jimmy Bullard
- Country of origin: United Kingdom
- Original language: English
- No. of series: 3
- No. of episodes: 20 (list of episodes)

Production
- Executive producer: Dan Baldwin
- Production locations: Fountain Studios (2015–16); BBC Elstree Centre (2017)
- Running time: 60 minutes (2017); 45 minutes (2015–16)
- Production company: Hungry Bear Media

Original release
- Network: ITV
- Release: 11 April 2015 – 4 April 2017

Play to the Whistle is a British sports comedy panel game show that aired on ITV from 11 April 2015 to 4 April 2017. With similarities to Sky's A League of Their Own, each episode saw two teams of three compete in sports knowledge rounds and physical games to achieve points for their teams, with the team with the most points at the end declared the winner.

The show was hosted by Holly Willoughby. One team was captained by entertainer, actor and presenter Bradley Walsh and the other team by former professional footballer Frank Lampard. Lampard was joined by comedian Romesh Ranganathan as a regular panellist. Seann Walsh, also a comedian, was the resident scorer. Former professional footballer Jimmy Bullard was the host's assistant in the first series.

== Production ==
The show was commissioned as part of ITV's endeavour to find a panel show for their flagship channel after other pilot series had aired. The show was made by Hungry Bear Media and the executive producer was Dan Baldwin, Holly Willoughby's husband. Despite the sport theme, ITV said that they were not targeting sports fans specifically but producing the show for the whole family audience. Baldwin stated that the host's lack of sports knowledge would help viewers in the same position. Filming of each episode took place at the Fountain Studios in Wembley in front of a live studio audience. The first two episodes of the first series were recorded on 31 March 2015, the next two on 20 April, one on 27 April and the final two on 3 May. It was revealed in November 2015 that ITV had ordered a second series. Episodes for this series were recorded on 8 January, 15 January and 17 January 2016 with 2 episodes being recorded each day. Willoughby promoted the third and final series as a guest on The One Show on 27/02/17.

The show's title came from the phrase used in football; the idea that players should continue with the game, even if they believe play should be stopped for any reason, until the referee has blown his whistle to halt play. In the show Willoughby blew her whistle to conclude the rounds.

== Transmissions ==
Series	Episodes	Originally released		Series ratings (in millions)
Series	Episodes	First released	Last released	Series ratings (in millions)
1	8	11 April 2015	6 June 2015	2.53
2	7	16 April 2016	28 May 2016	2.66
3	6	28 February 2017	4 April 2017	1.60
