= Seeing Is Believing =

Seeing Is Believing may refer to:

== Film and television ==
- "Seeing Is Believing" (Code Lyoko episode)
- UFOs: Seeing Is Believing, a UFO documentary film
- Seeing Is Believing: Handicams, Human Rights and the News, a 2002 Canadian documentary film
- Seeing Is Believing (film), a 1934 British film
- Seeing Is Believing (TV series), a 1985 Australian TV series
- "Seeing Is Believing" (Due South), a 1997 television episode
- "Seeing Is Believing" (Run Away), a 2026 television episode

== Music ==
- "Seein' Is Believin'", a song by Guy Lombardo and His Royal Canadians; see Guy Lombardo § Decca (1934–1935)
- Seeing Is Believing (album), an album by German singer Xavier Naidoo
- "Seeing Is Believing" (song), a song by Andrew Lloyd Webber from Aspects of Love

== Other uses ==
- Seeing Is Believing (novel), a 1941 mystery novel by John Dickson Carr writing as "Carter Dickson"
- Seeing Is Believing (organization), a partnership for the prevention of avoidable blindness
- Seeing Is Believing Tour, magician Dynamo's 2015-16 live tour
