= The Michael McIntyre Chat Show =

- Genre: Comedy chat show
- Directed by: Richard Valentine
- Presented by: Michael McIntyre
- Theme music composer: Nasser Bouzida; De Wolfe Music
- Country of origin: United Kingdom
- Original language: English
- No. of series: 1
- No. of episodes: 7 (list of episodes)

Production
- Executive producers: Andrew Beint; Ben Winston
- Producers: Christopher Barbour; Tom Corrigan
- Production location: The London Studios
- Editor: Steve Andrews
- Running time: 45 minutes
- Production company: Open Mike Productions

Original release
- Network: BBC One
- Release: 10 March – 25 December 2014

The Michael McIntyre Chat Show is a comedy chat show presented by Michael McIntyre. It aired on BBC One from 10 March 2014 until 25 December of the same year.

== Episodes ==
=== Series overview ===
Series	Episodes	Originally released	
Series	Episodes	First released	Last released
1	6	10 March 2014	14 April 2014
Special		25 December 2014	

=== Series 1 ===
Episode	Date	Guests	Ratings (millions)
1	10 March 2014	Lily Allen, Lord Sugar and Sir Terry Wogan	2.41
2	17 March 2014	Abbey Clancy, Jeremy Clarkson and Sir David Jason	2.04
3	24 March 2014	Joanna Lumley, Tinie Tempah and Richard Madeley	1.77
4	31 March 2014	Gary Barlow, Bear Grylls and Nigella Lawson	1.99
5	7 April 2014	Ray Winstone, Dynamo and Holly Willoughby	2.20
6	14 April 2014	Sir Bruce Forsyth, James Corden and Alex Jones	1.90

=== Very Christmassy Christmas Show ===
This was a Christmas special which took place in a different set with a slightly different format to the other episodes. The length of the episode was longer than the regular episodes being 60 minutes, rather than 45 minutes. The show started with McIntyre doing a short stand-up act, before guests came on and Michael cooked with Jamie Oliver in the kitchen. The show ended with McIntyre and the other guests singing a Christmas carol together.

Episode	Date	Guests	Ratings (millions)
1	25 December 2014	Brendan O'Carroll (Mrs Brown), Robbie Williams, Rob Brydon, Jamie Cullum, Barbara Windsor and Jamie Oliver	5.24

=== Cancelled series 2 ===
It was confirmed at the end of the first series that the show will return for a second series. Although it was later stated that a second series would not happen.

== Opening Sequence ==
The first, second and fifth episodes include Michael going over to the right of the set and starts talking to Paul (the guy who pulls up the gauze) and would then go to the opening sequence. All other episodes (third, fourth and sixth) just go straight to the opening sequence. In the opening sequence the camera first goes over this door which says on air and then goes over the audience and around the studio which zoom's into the T.V. and the announcer reveals the guests as shown on the screen. Michael enters from the gauze and the show starts.

== Send to All ==
McIntyre takes an audience member's phone and sends a text message to everyone in their contacts and throughout the show he reads their replies. At the end of the show the phone is returned and gives a special 'Send to All' telephone. In the first episode, McIntyre also sent a text at the end saying this has all been a joke by himself and included a selfie. The game was not played in fourth episode and was left unexplained why. In the sixth episode James Corden played the game on McIntyre's phone, whilst McIntyre sent a message on Corden's phone. 'Send to All' continued for McIntyre's following Saturday Night show Michael McIntyre's Big Show with celebrities taking part.

=== List of Send to All Texts ===
Episode	Date	Participant	Text
1	10 March 2014	Oliver	Be honest, have I been annoying lately
2	17 March 2014	Andrew	Me and you need to spend more time together I'll hire a car and we will just drive, you in?
3	24 March 2014	Joseph	Thinking of getting a total makeover, where should I start?
4	31 March 2014	—N/a	—N/a
5	7 April 2014	Johnny	Lets be honest are we just friends or is something else going on? (Followed by two kissing Emojis)
6	14 April 2014	Michael McIntyre	I've just finished my chat show and I need to cut loose, me and you lap dancing, are you in or out, come on lets do this!
6	14 April 2014	James Corden	Guess who has been nominated for ANOTHER BAFTA? Yes, that's right, its me, the big dog. Lets celebrate the win now, me and you going lap dancing, lets do this.

== Set ==
The set features a dark wood desk, leather chair for guests, and a TV, sitting on blue rimmed red carpet. Guests enter from the left, with McIntyre entering from a gauze at the right.

The set was very different for the Christmas episode. It consisted of a leather chair and couch. A front door where the guests would enter from. There was a kitchen to the right of the set where the Christmas cooking was done.

== Reception ==
On average, the debut season of the show pulled in an average of 2.05 million viewers (excluding iPlayer catch-up and downloads). During the first series, it was alleged that the show was facing the axe; with McIntyre apparently claiming that he felt "uncomfortable" with the chat show format.
