= Kounnas =

Kounnas is a surname. Notable people with the surname include:

- Costas Kounnas (1952–2022), Cypriot theoretical physicist
- Mark Kounnas (born 1969), Australian actor and television presenter
- Melissa Kounnas, Australian actress and television presenter
