= Chances (TV series) =

1991 Australian television series

- Genre: Soap opera
- Created by: Lynn Bayonas; Brendon Lunney
- Opening theme: "Chances Theme" performed by Greg Hind
- Composer: Peter Sullivan
- Country of origin: Australia
- Original language: English
- No. of seasons: 2
- No. of episodes: 126 + pilot

Production
- Production locations: Melbourne, Australia
- Running time: 60 minutes
- Production company: Beyond Productions

Original release
- Network: Nine Network
- Release: 29 January 1991 – 31 December 1992

Chances is an Australian prime time soap opera which aired from 29 January 1991 to 31 December 1992 on Nine Network. The show was initially pitched by production company Beyond International, as a straightforward drama revolving around a middle-class family whose lives are transformed when they win $3 million in the lottery. However, the network requested raunchier, more erotic storylines in the vein of Number 96 and The Box, with contractually-obliged nudity and sex scenes. Later episodes diverged considerably from the show's original premise, with increasingly bizarre plots involving man-eating plants, devil worshippers and neo-Nazi cults.

The show has developed a cult following.

== Series history ==
=== Development ===
Chances was first made as a two-hour pilot in 1988, but it remained unseen until the show's DVD release in 2021. With the exception of The Flying Doctors (1986–1993), the Nine Network had suffered a solid decade of soap opera flops that had failed to build an audience, including Taurus Rising (1982), Waterloo Station (1983), Starting Out (1983), Kings (1983), Possession (1985) and Prime Time (1986). As such, Chances was shelved in 1989, however after the network's latest soap attempt, Family and Friends (1990), was canceled after just eight months, Chances was given the green light.

== Production ==
The series was produced by Beyond International whose only previous successful works had been the program Beyond 2000. Production moved from Sydney to Melbourne, at the network studios Richmond, Victoria and some roles were recast due to the unavailability of the original actors. John Sheerin and Brenda Addie (replacing Diane Craig from the pilot) starred as Dan and Barbara Taylor, who won the lottery and begin sharing their wealth with their children, friends, parents and siblings.

The series that cost $11,000.00 per episode to produce was recording losses, however the company, keen to get a stranglehold in the industry, continued producing the series despite their ill fortune.

The cast includes Jeremy Sims as their mischievous son Alex (replacing Marcus Graham, who left to star in E Street on Network Ten), Natalie McCurry and Cathy Godbold as their daughters Rebecca and Nicki (replacing Mouche Phillips), Tim Robertson as Dan's brother Jack (replacing Warwick Moss), Anne Grigg as his unhappy wife Sarah, Rhys Muldoon and Leverne McDonnell as their free-spirited hairdresser son Ben (replacing Christopher Stollery) and police officer daughter Philippa, Deborah Kennedy as Dan's divorced sister Connie (replacing Sandy Gore), Mark Kounnas and Simon Grey as her sons, Chris and Sam Reynolds, Mercia Deane-Johns as Dan's vivacious hairdresser sister Sharon, Yvonne Lawley as Barbara's mother Heather (nicknamed Hetty) and Michael Caton as Bill Anderson, Dan's best friend who smokes marijuana to ease the pain of injuries sustained in the Vietnam war.

=== Early episodes ===
Chances originally aired on Tuesday and Thursday evenings from 8:30pm. The pilot episode dealt with the build up to Rebecca's wedding to David Young (Rodney Bell), which ended with his shocking death in a car crash. As the family dealt with the fallout, they are interrupted with the announcement that Dan and Barbara had won the lottery. In a contentious bid to try and help ensure the program's success, network executives requested sex scenes and other risqué elements to be added to the series, which creator Lynn Bayonas was initially opposed to. The raunchier premise went ahead, which the initial publicity surrounding the series capitalised on.

The show was a modest success on its premiere night (with the first two episodes aired a two-hour special), however subsequent ratings proved disappointing. Early storylines included the return of Eddie Reynolds (Dennis Miller), Connie's estranged husband, which ends in his murder; the breakdown of Jack and Sarah's marriage, which leads to Sarah seducing her sexually confused nephew, Chris, causing a family scandal; police constable Philippa's illicit relationship with bent cop Geoff Bradbury (Gary Day) and his subsequent murder; her new house mate, eco-warrior, Charlie Gibson (Kimberley Davenport), who becomes pregnant to either Alex or Ben. The standard soap storylines were interspersed with randomly inserted seduction sequences, usually involving Alex, which filled the network quota of nudity and sex. Actor Jeremy Sims described the show as "Home and Away with the odd cutaway of some tits". As the ratings floundered, the writers ramped up the drama with the revelation that Alex's father was Jack, not Dan. As the repercussions of that bombshell settled, an explosion on The Sail Away yacht sees Dan and Bill lost at sea. Bill is found but tells Connie he believes Dan is dead, which Barbara overhears. Shell-shocked, she wanders into the grounds of the hospital car park. Jack runs outside after her when both are hit by a speeding car. They end up in hospital with serious injuries, while Dan is found alive and well, washed up on a beach.

=== Revamp ===
This dramatic attempt to save the show did not work, and after six months of poor ratings, the show's budget was cut and production halved to one hour a week on Tuesdays at 9:30pm. Starting with episode 61, which aired 27 August 1991, the show was jumped ahead by twelve months, and the next 16 episodes explored Alex's "missing" year with help from Paris (Annie Jones), a mysterious beautician who takes "Dan Mitchell" under her wing and helps him uncover the truth about his real identity. Episodes became self-contained and had individual titles, while most of the original seventeen cast members were written out one by one. First to go were the peripheral characters, Heather and Phillipa were both written out before the cutback and given exit storylines, while Sarah and Charlie disappeared entirely. Connie and her sons were demoted to recurring characters, before moving to an Italian ski resort after Chris fell in love with his widowed stepmother Cheryl (Kristen Lyons); Rebecca married politician Steve Harland (Peter Kowitz) and left after a lavish wedding ceremony, while Nicki left for modelling school. Guest actors were hired in short, provocative story arcs, including Lynda Stoner, Kate Fitzpatrick, Christine Harris, Tiffany Lamb, Liz Burch, Neill Gladwin and Briony Behets in an aggressive attempt to boost the ratings further. The sexual elements now involving bondage and lesbianism often in a mystical or fantastical setting, provoked considerable controversy among conservative viewers, with some television watchdogs attacking the show as "teleporn".

=== Later episodes ===
When Chances returned for its second season on 26 February 1992 at episode 79, only six of the original cast members remained; Barbara, Dan, Jack, Bill, Sharon, and Alex, who became the show's top-billed star with most storylines revolving around him and the intrigues of his new advertising agency, Inspirations. His partner at the agency, sultry and sarcastic Angela Sullivan (Patsy Stephen), who'd appeared from the second episode and become a regular after the time-jump, was promoted to second lead.

Several new actors were brought into the regular cast, including Molly Brumm as devious party girl Stephanie Ryan, Gerard Sont as pool boy and jewel thief Cal Lawrence, Ciri Thompson as the non-speaking (mute) Imogen Lander, Karen Richards as photographer Madeline Wolf, Abigail as television sex expert Bambi Chute, Laurence Mah as mobster Bogart Lo, Katherine Li as Lilly Lo (Bogart's manipulative daughter), Stephen Whittaker as advertising agent Sean Becker, and Danielle Fairclough as the ditzy virgin Wanda Starcross.

By this stage, the storyline straddled a fine line between reality and fantasy, and even before the departures of Dan and Barbara in episode 111, the show went completely off the rails with episodes involving man-eating plants, devil worshippers, Israeli secret agents, ghosts, laser-wielding vampires, Asian Triads, a scantily-clad angel on a Harley Davidson motorcycle, and neo-Nazis hunting valuable Third Reich artifacts (in Melbourne). The aforementioned artifact, the "Eva Braun necklace", turns its wearer into an Egyptian Sun Goddess. The Age noted that Chances became "notorious" because of these campy elements, and while the radical changes provoked publicity, ratings did not improve.

In other bizarre storylines, multi-billionaire Crowley Lander (possibly the son of Russia's "Mad Monk" Rasputin and the Czarina Alexandra) took control of Alex's body in an attempt to exchange their DNA; by this stage much of the action was taking place at the up-market brothel "Treasures" as well as at a private casino where the staff of Inspirations seemed to work all night before arriving at the ad agency the next morning.

In other episodes, the Devil appeared in the form of a late career Elvis; and in a flashback to the 1930s the young Crowley Lander encouraged the young John F. Kennedy in his political ambitions and introduced him to Marilyn Monroe. It's also made clear that Lander planned Kennedy's assassination in Dallas in 1963.

Eventually the show was moved to a late-night 11pm slot and the cast was reduced even further before the show was cancelled. In the finale, God made an appearance, speaking to Alex in the Melbourne library.

== Cast ==
=== Main characters ===
The following cast members appear in the opening credits at least once during the series.

- John Sheerin as Dan Taylor (ep. 1–114)
- Tim Robertson as Jack Taylor (ep. 1–90)
- Brenda Addie as Barbara Taylor (ep. 1–114)
- Anne Grigg as Sarah Taylor (ep. 1–60)
- Michael Caton as Bill Anderson
- Jeremy Sims as Alex Taylor
- Deborah Kennedy as Connie Reynolds (ep. 1–60, recurring ep. 61–68)
- Yvonne Lawley as Heather "Hetty" McGlashen (ep. 1–60)
- Natalie McCurry as Rebecca Taylor (ep. 1–70)
- Mercia Deane-Johns as Sharon Taylor
- Leverne McDonnell as Phillipa Taylor (ep. 1–60)
- Rhys Muldoon as Ben Taylor (ep. 1–70)
- Mark Kounnas as Chris Reynolds (ep. 1–60, guest star ep. 67–68)
- Cathy Godbold as Nicki Taylor (ep. 1–70, guest star ep. 71)
- Simon Grey as Sam Reynolds (ep. 1–60, guest star ep. 68)
- Kimberley Davenport as Charlie Gibson (ep. 4–60)
- Patsy Stephen as Angela Sullivan (ep. 61–127, recurring ep. 2–60)
- Molly Brumm as Stephanie Ryan (ep. 71–90, guest star ep. 70)
- Gerard Sont (ep. 79–114) and John Atkinson (ep. 115–127) as Cal Lawrence
- Karen Richards as Madeline Wolf (ep. 90–127, guest star ep. 88–89)
- Stephen Whittaker as Sean Beckett (Note: Whittaker previously appeared as Sven Loader in ep. 63.) (ep. 90–127)
- Abigail as Bambi Chute (ep. 90–114, guest star ep. 89)
- Katherine Li as Lily Lo (ep. 115–127, recurring ep. 90–114)
- Lawrence Mah as Bogart Lo (Note: Mah previously appeared as Japanese Man in ep. 64.) (ep. 115–127, recurring ep. 89–114)
- Danielle Fairclough as Wanda Starcross (ep. 115–127, recurring ep. 97–114)

=== Recurring characters ===
- Margot Knight as Jennifer Parsons (ep. 1–7)
- Tammy MacIntosh as Mandy Foster (ep. 1–6)
- Syd Jackson as Warwick Carlton (ep. 1–42)
- Gary Day as Geoff Bradbury (ep. 1–18, 60)
- Dennis Miller as Eddie Reynolds (ep. 4–30)
- Louise Siversen (ep. 14–44) and Kristen Lyons (ep. 67–68) as Cheryl Richards
- Olivia Hamnett as Rhonda Scott (ep. 21–32)
- Vince Martin as Gordon McKinney (ep. 31–44)
- David Roberts as Matt Hennessy (ep. 38–64)
- Peter Kowitz as Steve Harland (ep. 45–70)
- Lynda Stoner as Dee Dee Nelson (ep. 47–59)
- Eric Oldfield as Gary Duncan (ep. 53–60)
- Annie Jones as Paris Watkins (ep. 61–69)
- Kevin J. Wilson (ep. 61, 89–102) and John Arnold (ep. 110–121) as Sir Malcolm Watkins
- Barry Hill as Crowley Lander (ep. 86–119)
- Ciri Thompson as Imogen Lander (ep. 86–119)
- Kim Donnell as Segal (ep. 107–113)
- Peter Lindsay as Utangi (ep. 112–115)

=== Notable guest stars ===
- Rodney Bell as David Young (ep. 1–2)
- Ross Thompson as Lucas Dobbs (ep. 26, 36)
- Brett Swain as Jared (ep. 40)
- Diana Davidson as Anna Novak (ep. 45–48)
- Alwyn Kurts as Aubrey Nash (ep. 50–52)
- Tiffany Lamb as Brandy (ep. 72)
- Ann Rigby as Sister Mary Luke (ep. 72) and Genevieve Olsen (ep. 86–94, 127)
- Liz Burch as Sally Kirk (ep. 73)
- Neill Gladwin as Ted E. Baer (ep. 75)
- Briony Behets as Dr Christine Marquette (ep. 76–77)
- Jeff Phillips as Frankie Kelly (ep. 82)
- Richard Morgan as Michael Tranzi (ep. 84)
- Katrina McEwan as Faith Matthews (ep. 85)
- Helen Scott as Carol Hawkins (ep. 85)
- Kate Langbroek (episode 116)

Cast notes

== Impact and reception ==
Chances Australian DVD release from 2004.

=== Awards and nominations ===
At the APRA Music Awards of 1991, the theme song for Chances, performed by Greg Hind, won Television or Film Theme of the Year.

At the 1992 Logie Awards, actor Jeremy Sims was nominated for Most Popular New Talent for his role in Chances, but lost out to Kym Wilson for her roles in both A Country Practice and the mini-series, Brides of Christ. At the time, both Sims and Wilson were in a highly publicised relationship.

=== International broadcasts ===
A year after its Australian debut, Chances began airing in the United Kingdom on Sky One on 4 March 1992 at 9pm on Wednesdays and Thursdays. Like in Australia, Sky's promotion of the show centred heavily on the sexual aspects of the show, although it failed to achieve high ratings as with Studs and E Street When the show reached episode 61, Chances moved to Thursday nights at 10pm until mid-1993. Both the original and 1995 late-night repeat run ended at episode 107, as Sky One never purchased the last block of 19 episodes, possibly due to their controversial content.

Chances was also shown on Russian television. However, the series was taken off the air after members of the Russian Orthodox Church objected to a scene showing a naked woman saluting a swastika.

The show was screened on Channel 2 in New Zealand for nearly a year, but was moved to a later timeslot, and eventually dropped due to low ratings.

Bayonas also tried to sell Chances to American broadcasters, however, the only interested network was the Playboy Channel, which Bayonas declined.

=== Home media ===
Chances was first released on DVD by Umbrella Entertainment in three 2-disc volumes, which focused entirely on the show's later, more fantastical era. In 2021, ViaVision Entertainment released the entire series in two collections, the first across 16 discs, the second across 17.

Release	No. of episodes	Region 4 (Australia)	Includes
Chances: Volume One	7	23 June 2004	episodes 97–104; extensive liner notes by Andrew Mercado; original episode previews; stills gallery
Chances: Volume Two	7	23 June 2004	episodes 116–117, 121–126; extensive liner notes by Andrew Mercado; original episode previews; stills gallery
Chances: Volume Three	7	10 July 2006	episodes 109–114, 120, 127; extensive liner notes by Andrew Mercado; original episode previews; stills gallery
Chances: Collection One	59	18 August 2021	episodes 1–59; the show's 1989 unaired pilot
Chances: Collection Two	67	17 November 2021	episodes 60–127
Chances: The Complete Collection	126	23 November 2022 23 August 2023 (Re-Release)	All episodes

==== Episode discrepancy ====
As detailed in ViaVision Entertainment's DVD release, there was no "episode 78" produced, thought to have been accidentally skipped over in error. The 77th episode marked the end of a production block, with the next block resuming from "episode 79". This led to all subsequent episodes to be numbered incorrectly, with the final 126th episode being listed as "episode 127".

=== Rebroadcast ===
On 26 February 2026, David Knox of TV Tonight reported that that Chances and Number 96 would be airing on Foxtel for the first time. Both shows were set to air from Episode 1 on Aussie Classics on 2 March 2026. TV Historian Andrew Mercado stated "Neither of these shows has been repeated nationally since the 70s and 90s. Audiences who have never seen them before will finally see why both became such cult successes now. Big thanks to the NFSA, Umbrella Entertainment and Foxtel for making this happen, and there's more on the way."
