= List of Michael McIntyre's Big Show episodes =

Michael McIntyre's Big Show (also known as Michael McIntyre's Big Christmas Show) is a BAFTA award-winning British variety and stand-up comedy television series, presented by British comedian, presenter Michael McIntyre.

== Series overview ==
Series	Episodes	Originally released		Average UK viewership (in millions)
Series	Episodes	First released	Last released	Average UK viewership (in millions)
Pilot		25 December 2015		—N/a
1	6	16 April 2016	28 May 2016	4.22
2	6	19 November 2016	24 December 2016	6.63
3	6	18 November 2017	24 December 2017	6.97
4	8	17 November 2018	12 January 2019	7.58
5	6	23 November 2019	25 December 2019	7.22
6	6	14 January 2023	18 February 2023	5.36
7	6	13 January 2024	17 February 2024	5.67
8	6	18 January 2025	22 February 2025	TBA
9	6	17 January 2026	28 February 2026	TBA

== Episodes ==
=== Christmas Special (2015) ===
Michael McIntyre's Big Christmas Show aired on 25 December 2015 on BBC One. This episode also served as a pilot for the upcoming series.

No. overall	No. in season	Title	Original release date	Guest(s)	UK viewers (millions)
1	1	Michael McIntyre's Big Christmas Show	25 December 2015	Ellie Goulding and Paul Zerdin	N/A

=== Series 1 (2016) ===
The BBC announced they had ordered a full series which aired from 16 April until 28 May 2016.

No. overall	No. in season	Title	Original release date	Guest(s)	UK viewers (millions)
2	1	Episode 1	16 April 2016	Michael Ball, Tinie Tempah and Geri Horner	5.56
3	2	Episode 2	23 April 2016	Jess Glynne, Jamie Allan, Bryan Adams, Josh Widdicombe and Ronan Keating	5.78
4	3	Episode 3	30 April 2016	James Morrison, Rod Stewart, Romesh Ranganathan and Peter Jones	5.14
5	4	Episode 4	7 May 2016	Years & Years, Rob Beckett, Cirque du Soleil and Bruno Tonioli	4.45
6	5	Episode 5	21 May 2016	Katherine Jenkins, Colin Cloud and Robbie Savage	4.37
7	6	Episode 6	28 May 2016	All Saints and Alex Jones	N/A

=== Series 2 (2016) ===
On 7 May 2016, the BBC announced that a second series of Michael McIntyre's Big Show had been commissioned.

This series aired for six episodes and was recorded in August, September and October 2016. The series began airing on BBC One on 19 November 2016. There was also a Christmas special entitled Michael Mcintyre's Big Christmas Show that aired on Christmas Eve.

No. overall	No. in season	Title	Original release date	Guest(s)	UK viewers (millions)
Main series
8	1	Episode 1	19 November 2016	Ellie Goulding, Olly Murs and the cast of School of Rock	7.03
9	2	Episode 2	26 November 2016	Russell Howard, OneRepublic and Alexander Armstrong	6.55
10	3	Episode 3	3 December 2016	Sarah Millican, Tom Odell, Shane Filan and Carol Vorderman	6.72
11	4	Episode 4	10 December 2016	Rick Astley, Olly Murs and Rebecca Adlington	6.16
12	5	Episode 5	17 December 2016	Sting, Jack Whitehall, David Brent (Ricky Gervais) and Jamie Oliver	7.58
Christmas special
13	6	Michael McIntyre's Big Christmas Show	24 December 2016	Michael Ball, Alfie Boe, Louis Smith, Nan (Catherine Tate), Kevin the Teenager (Harry Enfield) and Aled Jones	6.44

=== Series 3 (2017) ===
On 23 November 2016, it was announced that the BBC had commissioned a third series of Michael McIntyre's Big Show. Six episodes were recorded in September and October 2017 and the series began airing from 18 November and ending with a Christmas Special entitled Michael McIntyre's Big Christmas Show on Christmas Eve.

No. overall	No. in season	Title	Original release date	Guest(s)	UK viewers (millions)
Main series
14	1	Episode 1	18 November 2017	Emeli Sande, Ed Balls and Joe Lycett	6.86
15	2	Episode 2	25 November 2017	Danny Dyer, Gary Barlow, Clean Bandit and Russell Kane	7.21
16	3	Episode 3	2 December 2017	Alan Shearer, Stereophonics and Jessie J	6.55
17	4	Episode 4	9 December 2017	Marvin Humes, Rochelle Humes, The Vamps, Maggie Lindemann and Jason Manford	6.56
18	5	Episode 5	16 December 2017	Miranda Hart and Niall Horan	7.56
Christmas special
19	6	Michael McIntyre's Big Christmas Show	24 December 2017	Alesha Dixon, Bill Bailey and Seal	7.09

=== Series 4 (2018–19) ===
It was announced in December 2017 that the series had been renewed for a fourth series, consisting of 8 episodes, to air in Autumn 2018. It premiered on BBC One on 17 November 2018. Viewing figures adapted from BARB. At the end of series 4, a recap special was aired wherein Michael looked back at his favourite surprises and pranks from the first four series of the Big Show.

No. overall	No. in season	Title	Original release date	Guest(s)	UK viewers (millions)
Main series
20	1	Episode 1	17 November 2018	Little Mix and Holly Willoughby	7.64
21	2	Episode 2	24 November 2018	Kylie Minogue and Bradley Walsh	7.92
22	3	Episode 3	1 December 2018	Michael Bublé, Rita Ora, Eamonn Holmes and Ruth Langsford	7.52
23	4	Episode 4	8 December 2018	Josh Groban, Paloma Faith, Nile Rodgers, Chic	7.25
24	5	Episode 5	15 December 2018	Anton du Beke, Dani Dyer, Samira Mighty, Gino D'Acampo and Cheryl	8.46
Christmas special
25	6	Michael McIntyre's Big Christmas Show	25 December 2018	Katherine Jenkins and Chris Kamara	7.88
Main series (cont.)
26	7	Episode 7	5 January 2019	Cheryl, Peter Andre and George Ezra	7.22
27	8	Episode 8	12 January 2019	Alan Carr, Snow Patrol and Oti Mabuse	6.77
Recap special
28	9	Michael McIntyre's Big Show - Big Surprises Special	19 January 2019	N/A	4.83

=== Series 5 (2019) ===
At the end of the fourth series on Saturday 12 January 2019. Michael announced at the end of the show, that a fifth series would be on later in 2019. Filming for series 5 took place at the new location of the London Palladium in September, October and November 2019. The fifth series started on Saturday 23 November 2019 and ran for five weeks between 23 November and 21 December 2019. The series concluded with a Christmas Special on Christmas Day 2019.

No. overall	No. in season	Title	Original release date	Guest(s)	UK viewers (millions)
Main series
29	1	Episode 1	23 November 2019	Bjorn Ulvaeus, Bear Grylls and Liam Payne	7.58
30	2	Episode 2	30 November 2019	Emma Bunton, Robert Rinder and Freya Ridings	7.07
31	3	Episode 3	7 December 2019	Harry Redknapp, Westlife and Camila Cabello	7.33
32	4	Episode 4	14 December 2019	Ellie Goulding and Andrea Bocelli	7.56
33	5	Episode 5	21 December 2019	Ian Wright and Robbie Williams	6.95
Christmas special
34	6	Michael McIntyre's Big Christmas Show	25 December 2019	Sharon Osbourne and Craig Revel Horwood	6.85

=== Series 6 (2023) ===
After a three year break due to the COVID-19 pandemic, Michael McIntyre's Big Show returned to the screens in January 2023 for its 6th series.

No. overall	No. in season	Title	Original release date	Guest(s)	UK viewers (millions)
Main series
35	1	Episode 1	14 January 2023	Rylan Clark, Joel Corry, Tom Grennan and Bryn Terfel	5.28
36	2	Episode 2	21 January 2023	Alison Hammond, Peter Crouch and George Ezra	5.15
37	3	Episode 3	28 January 2023	Jonathan Ross, Chris Ramsey and Nile Rodgers & Chic	5.69
38	4	Episode 4	4 February 2023	Lewis Capaldi and Peter Andre	5.47
39	5	Episode 5	11 February 2023	Stacey Dooley, Olly Murs and Alexander Armstrong	5.69
40	6	Episode 6	18 February 2023	Jermaine Jenas and Ellie Goulding	4.90

=== Series 7 (2024) ===
No. overall	No. in season	Title	Original release date	Guest(s)	UK viewers (millions)
Main series
41	1	Episode 1	13 January 2024	Dermot O'Leary, Tony Hadley, Tom Kerridge and Jess Glynne	5.74
42	2	Episode 2	20 January 2024	Bradley Walsh, Frank Lampard, Katherine Ryan and Beverley Knight	5.87
43	3	Episode 3	27 January 2024	Joe Lycett, Joey Essex, Vanessa Feltz, James Arthur and LeAnn Rimes	5.54
44	4	Episode 4	3 February 2024	Alison Hammond, Ricky Wilson, Anne-Marie and James Blunt	5.80
45	5	Episode 5	10 February 2024	AJ Odudu, Thomas Skinner, Rachel Riley and Zara Larsson	5.67
46	6	Episode 6	17 February 2024	Tom Allen, Eric Cantona, Chesney Hawkes, Alex Jones, Jermaine Jenas and James Nesbitt	5.40
Compilation Special
47	7	Michael McIntyre's Big Show - Funniest Bits	30 March 2024	N/A	2.99

=== Series 8 (2025) ===
No. overall	No. in season	Title	Original release date	Guest(s)	UK viewers (millions)
Main series
48	1	Episode 1	18 January 2025	Jamie Oliver, Marti Pellow, Sam Thompson and Zara McDermott	5.18
49	2	Episode 2	25 January 2025	Michael Sheen, Olly Murs and Craig David	5.35
50	3	Episode 3	1 February 2025	Miranda Hart, Luke Littler, Tony Hadley, Heather Small and Calum Scott	5.57
51	4	Episode 4	8 February 2025	Josh Widdicombe, Tony Bellew, Justin Hawkins and Olly Alexander	5.35
52	5	Episode 5	15 February 2025	Judi Love, Shirley Ballas, Michael Ball and Alfie Boe	5.46
53	6	Episode 6	22 February 2025	Holly Willoughby, Perrie Edwards and Busted v McFly	5.64

=== Series 9 (2026) ===
No. overall	No. in season	Title	Original release date	Guest(s)	UK viewers (millions)
Main series
54	1	Episode 1	17 January 2026	Peter Crouch, Abbey Clancy, Romesh Ranganathan, Melanie C and Joe Marler	5.43
55	2	Episode 2	24 January 2026	KSI, Sophie Ellis-Bextor, Shane Richie, Angela Scanlon and Myles Smith	5.53
56	3	Episode 3	31 January 2026	Frank Skinner, Rob Rinder and Cat Burns	5.18
57	4	Episode 4	7 February 2026	Rylan, Jonathan Ross, Alex Jones, Westlife and Tinie Tempah	5.01
58	5	Episode 5	21 February 2026	Peter Crouch, Abbey Clancy, B*Witched, Shane Richie, Gillian Taylforth and Katherine Jenkins	3.72
59	6	Episode 6	28 February 2026	Jade Thirlwall, Jack Savoretti and Tasha Ghouri	4.53
