= Michael McIntyre's Big World Tour =

2017–2020 comedy tour

- Tour by Michael McIntyre
- Start date: 21 April 2017
- End date: 1 February 2020
- Legs: 10
- No. of shows: 119 in Europe; 14 in Oceania; 55 in North America; 3 in Africa; 6 in Asia; 242 in total

Michael McIntyre's Big World Tour is a comedy tour by British comedian Michael McIntyre. The tour began in Ta' Qali at the Malta Fairs and Conventions Centre on 21 April 2017, and concluded in New York City, United States at the Radio City Music Hall on 1 February 2020.

McIntyre sold 837,197 tickets for his tour, across 242 shows in 20 countries.

== Background and development ==
Following the success of his previous tours, most recently "Happy and Glorious", a world tour was announced in 2017. Tickets for the UK shows went on sale on 5 May 2017. A high demand prompted many extra dates to be added at numerous venues and locations. Shows in Australia and New Zealand sold out in record time, selling out five arena shows in three days. As of December 2019, the tour is set to consist of 121 shows in total; 93 in Europe, 14 in Oceania, 5 in North America, 3 in Africa and 6 in Asia.

== Tour dates ==
List of shows, showing date, city, country and venue
Date	City	Country	Venue
Europe
21 April 2017	Ta' Qali	Malta	Malta Fairs & Conventions Centre
22 April 2017	Ta' Qali	Malta	Malta Fairs & Conventions Centre
4 May 2017	Reykjavík	Iceland	Laugardalshöll
5 May 2017	Stockholm	Sweden	Stockholm Waterfront
6 May 2017	Kristiansand	Norway	Aquarama Bad
13 May 2017	Amsterdam	Netherlands	AFAS Live
8 June 2017	Zürich	Switzerland	Samsung Hall
9 June 2017	Geneva	Switzerland	SEG Geneva Arena
15 June 2017	Bergen	Norway	Grieg Hall
16 June 2017	Bergen	Norway	Grieg Hall
17 June 2017	Bergen	Norway	Grieg Hall
Asia
27 November 2017	Hong Kong		Star Hall
28 November 2017	Hong Kong		Star Hall
29 November 2017	Singapore		The Star Theatre
Africa
18 January 2018	Cape Town	South Africa	Grand Arena
19 January 2018	Cape Town	South Africa	Grand Arena
20 January 2018	Johannesburg	South Africa	Ticketpro Dome
North America
1 February 2018	New York City	United States	Beacon Theatre
2 February 2018	Toronto	Canada	Winter Garden Theatre
3 February 2018	Toronto	Canada	Winter Garden Theatre
Europe
8 March 2018	Plymouth	England	Plymouth Pavilions
9 March 2018	Plymouth	England	Plymouth Pavilions
10 March 2018	Plymouth	England	Plymouth Pavilions
11 March 2018	Plymouth	England	Plymouth Pavilions
15 March 2018	Bournemouth	England	Bournemouth International Centre
16 March 2018	Bournemouth	England	Bournemouth International Centre
17 March 2018	Bournemouth	England	Bournemouth International Centre
18 March 2018	Bournemouth	England	Bournemouth International Centre
22 March 2018	Nottingham	England	Motorpoint Arena
23 March 2018	Nottingham	England	Motorpoint Arena
24 March 2018	Nottingham	England	Motorpoint Arena
25 March 2018	Nottingham	England	Motorpoint Arena
11 April 2018	Cardiff	Wales	Motorpoint Arena
12 April 2018	Cardiff	Wales	Motorpoint Arena
13 April 2018	Cardiff	Wales	Motorpoint Arena
14 April 2018	Cardiff	Wales	Motorpoint Arena
15 April 2018	Cardiff	Wales	Motorpoint Arena
16 April 2018	Cardiff	Wales	Motorpoint Arena
19 April 2018	Manchester	England	Manchester Arena
20 April 2018	Manchester	England	Manchester Arena
21 April 2018	Manchester	England	Manchester Arena
27 April 2018	Liverpool	England	Echo Arena
28 April 2018	Liverpool	England	Echo Arena
4 May 2018	Newcastle	England	Metro Radio Arena
5 May 2018	Newcastle	England	Metro Radio Arena
10 May 2018	Birmingham	England	Arena Birmingham
11 May 2018	Birmingham	England	Arena Birmingham
12 May 2018	Birmingham	England	Arena Birmingham
13 May 2018	Birmingham	England	Arena Birmingham
15 May 2018	Plymouth	England	Plymouth Pavilions
16 May 2018	Plymouth	England	Plymouth Pavilions
18 May 2018	Leeds	England	First Direct Arena
19 May 2018	Leeds	England	First Direct Arena
25 May 2018	Brighton	England	Brighton Centre
26 May 2018	Brighton	England	Brighton Centre
27 May 2018	Brighton	England	Brighton Centre
28 May 2018	Brighton	England	Brighton Centre
29 May 2018	Brighton	England	Brighton Centre
30 May 2018	Brighton	England	Brighton Centre
1 June 2018	Belfast	Northern Ireland	SSE Arena
2 June 2018	Belfast	Northern Ireland	SSE Arena
7 June 2018	Dublin	Ireland	3Arena
8 June 2018	Dublin	Ireland	3Arena
9 June 2018	Dublin	Ireland	3Arena
10 June 2018	Dublin	Ireland	3Arena
12 June 2018	Aberdeen	Scotland	BHGE Arena
13 June 2018	Aberdeen	Scotland	BHGE Arena
14 June 2018	Glasgow	Scotland	SSE Hydro
15 June 2018	Glasgow	Scotland	SSE Hydro
16 June 2018	Glasgow	Scotland	SSE Hydro
23 June 2018	Sheffield	England	FlyDSA Arena
4 September 2018	Plymouth	England	Plymouth Pavilions
5 September 2018	Plymouth	England	Plymouth Pavilions
5 October 2018	London	England	The O_{2} Arena
6 October 2018	London	England	The O_{2} Arena
7 October 2018	London	England	The O_{2} Arena
11 October 2018	London	England	The O_{2} Arena
12 October 2018	London	England	The O_{2} Arena
13 October 2018	London	England	The O_{2} Arena
14 October 2018	London	England	The O_{2} Arena
9 November 2018	London	England	SSE Arena Wembley
10 November 2018	London	England	SSE Arena Wembley
11 November 2018	London	England	SSE Arena Wembley
3 December 2018	London	England	Eventim Apollo
Europe
7 March 2019	Ta' Qali	Malta	Malta Fairs & Conventions Centre
8 March 2019	Ta' Qali	Malta	Malta Fairs & Conventions Centre
Australia
19 March 2019	Perth	Australia	Perth Arena
20 March 2019	Perth	Australia	Perth Arena
22 March 2019	Melbourne	Australia	Rod Laver Arena
23 March 2019	Sydney	Australia	Qudos Bank Arena
24 March 2019	Sydney	Australia	Qudos Bank Arena
26 March 2019	Adelaide	Australia	Adelaide Entertainment Centre
28 March 2019	Brisbane	Australia	Brisbane Entertainment Centre
29 March 2019	Brisbane	Australia	Brisbane Entertainment Centre
Asia
24 April 2019	Muscat	Oman	Oman Convention Centre
25 April 2019	Dubai	United Arab Emirates	World Trade Centre
26 April 2019	Dubai	United Arab Emirates	World Trade Centre
Europe
3 May 2019	Copenhagen	Denmark	Royal Arena
Oceania
14 June 2019	Hobart	Australia	Derwent Entertainment Centre
15 June 2019	Melbourne	Australia	Rod Laver Arena
17 June 2019	Christchurch	New Zealand	Horncastle Arena
18 June 2019	Christchurch	New Zealand	Horncastle Arena
20 June 2019	Auckland	New Zealand	Spark Arena
21 June 2019	Auckland	New Zealand	Spark Arena
North America
25 July 2019	Montreal	Canada	Théâtre Maisonneuve
Europe
2 September 2019	Aalborg	Denmark	Kongres & Kultur Center
27 November 2019	Stavanger	Norway	DNB Arena
28 November 2019	Oslo	Norway	Spektrum
29 November 2019	Lillehammer	Norway	Håkons Hall
30 November 2019	Trondheim	Norway	Trondheim Spektrum
North America
1 February 2020	New York City	United States	Radio City Music Hall
