= Colour in the Creek =

Television series

- Written by: Sonia Borg
- Starring: Dennis Miller; Judy Morris; Ken Talbot
- Country of origin: Australia
- Original language: English
- No. of episodes: 10

Production
- Running time: 30 mins

Original release
- Network: Nine Network
- Release: 7 May – 9 July 1985

Colour in the Creek is a 1985 Australian children's TV series. It was made with a budget of $1.6 million and was adapted from the novel by Margaret Paice. and was adapted from the novels Colour in the Creek and Shadow of Wings by Margaret Paice.

Colour in the Creek was set in the Depression. A family relocates to the goldfields to try make ends meet. It won the Rockie award at the International Banff Television Festival in Canada.

== Cast ==
- Dennis Miller as John Fletcher
- Judy Morris as Ellen Fletcher
- Ken Talbot as Alec Fletcher
- Pascale Moray as Biddy Fletcher
- Hugh Clairmont-Simpson as Jonno Fletcher
- Ray Meagher as Clarrie
- Lorna Lesley as Ethel
- Philip Quast as Barney
- Su Cruickshank as Ada Coney
- Bob Hensley as Ron Royals
- Caz Adams as Flo
- Travis Latter as Robbie
- Alfred Bell as Mr. Ekman
