= PBL Productions =

Australian TV production company

PBL Productions was an Australian television film production company. It was an offshoot of the Nine Network, which broadcast many films and series produced by PBL.

Maura Fay worked as Head of Production for PBL Productions.

PBL's first drama series was Kings, which ran for 19 hour-long episodes that began on 12 July 1983.

Other films and series produced or distributed by PBL included:

- Bullseye (1987)
- I Can't Get Started (1985)
- Cyclone Tracy (1986)
- Double Sculls (1985)
- An Indecent Obsession (1985)
- High Country (1983)
- Skin Deep (1984)

== See also ==
- List of film production companies
- List of television production companies
