= Steven Frayne =

English magician (born 1982)

Steven Frayne M.M.C.
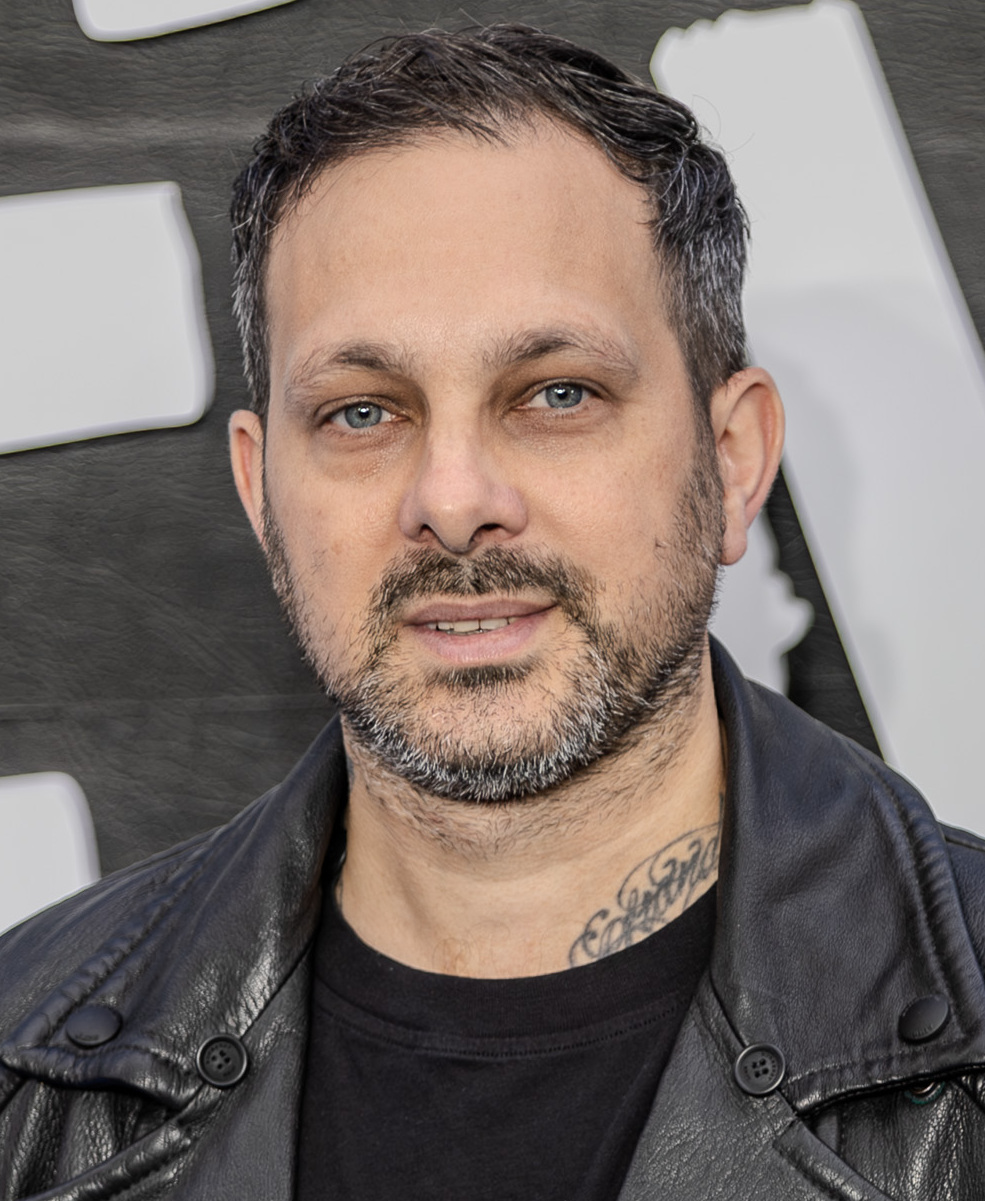
- Frayne in 2025
- Born: Steven Frayne; 17 December 1982 (age 43); Bradford, West Yorkshire, England
- Other name: Dynamo
- Occupation: Magician
- Years active: 2002–present

Steven Frayne M.M.C. (born 17 December 1982), formerly known by the stage name Dynamo, is a British magician and illusionist.

His television show Dynamo: Magician Impossible ran from July 2011 to September 2014, and saw him win the Best Entertainment Programme award at the 2012 and 2013 Broadcast Awards. He has toured the world, and his Seeing Is Believing arena tour was seen by more than 750,000 people across the UK, Australia, South Africa and New Zealand.

== Early life ==
Frayne was born in Bradford, England, to an English mother, aged 17, and a father of Pakistani Pashtun ancestry. Frayne is the eldest of four children, his late father went to prison in 1986 when Frayne was four. At the age of 19, his father came to see his act and, according to Frayne, made a failed attempt to recruit him into crime.

Frayne grew up for a time on the Delph Hill estate in Wyke, one of the most deprived areas in the UK at the time. Frayne was bullied at school. His great grandfather, who had learnt magic tricks in the RN, taught him his first trick to make him seem heavier so others couldn't pick him up. Frayne is a supporter of Bradford City A.F.C.

== Early career ==
Frayne was given the name Dynamo in 2001 while performing at Houdini's centenary celebrations at the New York Hilton in front of magic peers including David Blaine and David Copperfield. Impressed by Frayne's magic display, a member of the crowd shouted out: "this kid is an effing dynamo", and the name stuck.

In 2003, Frayne was given a loan from the Prince's Trust, allowing him to start his business and invest in camera equipment. Frayne moved to London in 2004 to build a career in magic, and his plan was to create the first ever 'magic mix-tape'. He set out with a small team to film his performances on the streets of London and backstage at events, after he had been permitted entry by impressing doormen and tour managers. Within a year, Frayne had created footage with Coldplay, Gwyneth Paltrow, Snoop Dogg and more. He quickly developed a fanbase after posting the clips on YouTube, helping to boost his profile to a wider audience.

== Professional career ==
Dynamo's first TV appearances began in 2002 on Channel 4's Richard & Judy. Bosses at the station were impressed with his magic abilities, and commissioned a one-hour documentary titled Dynamo's Estate of Mind, which followed him doing his routines around the London circuit.

=== Television ===
==== Dynamo: Magician Impossible ====
Dynamo: Magician Impossible is a documentary series purporting to follow the life of Frayne. The series was produced by Frayne's own production company Inner Circle Films and Phil McIntyre Productions for UKTV and Universal Networks International. The series reached more than 30 million viewers in the UK and more than 250 million viewers worldwide across 193 territories.

The four-episode first series aired from 7 July 2011 until 28 July 2011. To launch the show, Frayne walked on water across the River Thames outside the Houses of Parliament, in front of a crowd who had gathered on Westminster Bridge. The first series was filmed in London, Miami and Los Angeles, and had 6.69 million viewers in the UK, leading to UKTV renewing the show for a second and third series in February 2012.

The second series premiered on 5 July 2012, and was again four-episodes in duration. The show had 7.67 million viewers in the UK and won the award for Best Entertainment Programme at the Broadcast Awards, show of the year at the Virgin Media awards and was shortlisted for Best Entertainment Programme at the 17th National Television Awards. This series also received a BAFTA nomination for Best Entertainment Programme.

In 2013, Frayne travelled to New York City, Ibiza, South Africa and London to film content for the show's third series. The first episode, filmed in New York City, was broadcast on 11 July 2013 and was viewed by 1.35 million people. The series was again nominated for BAFTA's Best Entertainment Programme award, alongside Ant & Dec's Saturday Night Takeaway, Derren Brown: The Great Art Robbery and Strictly Come Dancing.

A fourth and final series of the show was commissioned by UKTV in 2014, which aired in September of the same year. In this series, Dynamo performed street magic in California, India, Paris, London, Manchester and Bradford. For the third year running, Dynamo: Magician Impossible was nominated by BAFTA for the Best Entertainment Programme award.

==== Dynamo Revealed ====
On 19 December 2013, Watch broadcast Dynamo Revealed, a documentary in which Frayne spoke to BBC Radio 1 presenter Zane Lowe about the steps he took to grow from rough area of Bradford to the magician that he is today.

==== Dynamo A–Z ====
In 2016, Watch commissioned an hour-long TV special titled Dynamo A–Z, where Dynamo presented a retrospective, alphabetical review of clips of some of his magic tricks from Dynamo: Magician Impossible.

==== Dynamo Live at The O2 ====
Frayne continued his work with Watch to bring his live arena tour, Seeing is Believing, to TV screens across the United Kingdom. Dynamo Live at The O2 followed Frayne as he embarked on the biggest live magic performance in British history. The show was broadcast live across the UK on Watch.

==== Dynamo is Dead ====
Dynamo is Dead is a 2023 TV special in which Frayne interviews a number of celebrities in preparation for his premature burial. He holds candid conversations about mental wellbeing and his own personal struggles, with guests Pete Davidson, Demi Lovato, Dave Chappelle and others. Frayne is then buried alive without a coffin for 2 mins and 57 seconds. This show was released on Sky TV in UK and History TV 18 in India.

==== Miracles ====
Miracles is a 90-minute TV special that aired on Sky Max on 19 December 2024 and features Frayne performing street magic around England.

==== Dynamo Vs Houdini ====
Upcoming three-part series; expected to air in late 2026 on Sky.

=== Media appearances ===
Frayne has appeared and performed on the TV shows Friday Night with Jonathan Ross, Snoop Dogg's Fatherhood, the MTV EMAs and more. He has also featured in advertisements for Adidas, Samsung and Pepsi, and has appeared on the catwalk for Naomi Campbell's Fashion for Relief.

Frayne's media appearances have regularly involved magic stunts with celebrities. In May 2009, Dynamo levitated comedian Matt Lucas four feet (1.2 m) off the ground in front of a crowd at the Emirates Stadium in London.

Frayne collaborated with Pepsi Max in 2013, where he levitated next to a London Bus driving through Central London. Later in the year, Frayne worked with Mercedes-Benz to create a video featuring Formula One driver David Coulthard.

In 2014, Frayne worked with Hunter and became a part of their London Fashion Week show. Frayne appeared to levitate and then made models, including Suki Waterhouse, vanish in front of the crowd which included Stella McCartney and Anna Wintour.

2015 saw Frayne work with Fiat to launch the Fiat 500X. Frayne made the car appear in a beam of light in front of a live audience at the Copper Box Arena in London for the car's pre-launch event. The live performance was a result of three years of work and preparation by Dynamo.

In March 2017, Dynamo worked with Betfair to help the FC Barcelona team bond with a series of unconventional training techniques. Dynamo first appeared at the club's training ground, before working on visualisation exercises with team members including Luis Suárez, Jordi Alba, Gerard Piqué, Sergio Busquets and Sergi Roberto.

Frayne has made charitable media appearances for Comic Relief, Sport Relief and Children in Need. In 2010, he appeared on BBC One's coverage of Sport Relief, where he appeared to turn lottery tickets into cash in front of singer Robbie Williams and presenter Davina McCall. He then later performed a levitation in front of comedian James Corden and a studio audience. The following year, Frayne appeared on Comic Relief, highlighting the work that British Airways had done to raise money.

Dynamo has appeared on networks and shows including ESPN, the BBC's Never Mind the Buzzcocks and Young Apprentice. In 2013, Frayne was flown out to Hollywood to film with pop band One Direction, as part of 1D Day. He also opened the semi-final of Strictly Come Dancing with a magic and dance routine.

In February 2018, Dynamo appeared in an episode of Amazon Prime's The Grand Tour, and in November of the same year, he made an appearance for Prince Charles' 70th birthday, where he performed on ITV's We Are Most Amused and Amazed.

=== Live tours ===
In 2014, Frayne announced his first live tour, Seeing Is Believing. Frayne's ambitions for the show were high, commenting to the press that "[he was] hoping that like [he] did for magic on TV, [he could] reinvent the live magic show and produce something fans have never seen before."

Dynamo was initially booked to play a 10-date run of shows in the UK, but following high demand for tickets, the run was extended to three years and 145 dates, where he sold more than 750,000 tickets and filled arenas across the UK, Australia, South Africa and New Zealand.

As part of the tour, Dynamo became the first magician to headline The O2, London. He performed at the London venue three times, with the final show being screened live on TV.

=== Books ===
In 2013, Frayne released his debut book Nothing Is Impossible: My Story, which became a Sunday Times bestseller.

In 2017, Frayne released Dynamo: The Book of Secrets, an illustrated beginner's guide to modern magic with tips and tricks. The Book of Secrets reached number 1 position in The Guardian's Paperback non-fiction chart.

== Charity ==
Frayne has worked with several charities throughout his career as a magician. As well as his work with the BBC's Children in Need, Comic Relief and Sport Relief, where he has appeared on screen performing magic.

In 2016, Dynamo worked on a film for Theirworld titled Safe Schools: Children can no longer wait, directed by Sebastian Thiel. In 2017, he was announced as Theirworld ambassador. Since then, Frayne has worked with the organisation to help promote the education of Syrian refugee children. As part of his work with the charity, Frayne has travelled around the world and to the United Nations to meet world leaders and discuss opportunities to help Syrian refugees.

== Personal life ==
Frayne was diagnosed with Crohn's disease when he was 13, and he had part of his intestine removed when he was a teenager in America visiting family. In 2018, he posted a video on Twitter discussing his struggles with the disease following a severe bout of campylobacteriosis food poisoning in 2017, which led to his suffering from severe arthritis, weight gain and rashes. In June 2020, Frayne issued a High Court writ for damages in excess of £200,000, against the franchise owners of a north London KFC for damages, alleging food poisoning, due to his consumption of uncooked chicken.

In 2012, Frayne married his partner Kelly, whom he met at a music festival. The couple now live in a Grade II listed cottage in Hampstead, north London. During a trip to South Africa in 2018, his London home was raided and robbed of £100,000 worth of watches and jewellery. The thief, a career criminal, was caught and convicted of the theft.

== Honours and recognition ==
Dynamo was promoted to Associate of the Magic Circle for Performance by the magicians' society The Magic Circle in 2012, the same year that Dynamo: Magician Impossible won the award for Best Entertainment Programme at the Broadcast Awards. The show also won Show of the Year at the Virgin Media Awards and received nominations for Best Entertainment Programme at the BAFTA TV Awards and the 17th National Television Awards.

Frayne was awarded an honorary degree from Bradford University in 2013, for his commitment to Bradford, improving opportunities for young people and his charity work. 2013 also saw Frayne receive the Grolla d'Oro award at the Masters of Magic Convention in Turin.

In 2015, Dynamo was named AMA Magician of the Year at The Academy of Magical Arts 48th Annual Awards Show. He was also given a Fellowship to the academy by its board of trustees. Dynamo was also awarded The Magic Circle's Maskelyne Award in 2016, which is awarded for services to British magic.

Following series 2 of Dynamo: Magician Impossible, the show again won the Broadcast Award for Best Entertainment Programme in 2013. Dynamo also won the accolade of TV Show of the Year at the Virgin Media Awards and was nominated for Best Entertainment Programme at the BAFTA TV Awards in the same year.

In 2014, Dynamo: Magician Impossible was nominated for Best Entertainment Programme at both the BAFTA TV Awards and the Televisual Bulldog Awards.

Dynamo was included in Forbes' list of The World's Highest-Paid Magicians in both 2016 and 2017.

== Releases ==
- Dynamo's Underground Magic (DVD)
- Dynamo's Estate of Mind (Channel 4)
- Dynamo's Concrete Playground (DVD) [2006]
- Dynamo: Magician Impossible (Series 1, 2, 3, 4) (DVD/Blu-ray)
- Dynamo Beyond Belief (Sky One)
- Dynamo is Dead
