= Danny's Egg =

Australian children's television film (1984)

- Based on: Story by James Badger
- Written by: David Haythornthwaite
- Directed by: David Haythornthwaite
- Starring: Ken Talbot; Paul Daniel; Kerry Wyld
- Music by: David Skinner
- Country of origin: Australia
- Original language: English

Production
- Producer: Michael Midlam
- Cinematography: Ernie Clark
- Editor: Zsolt Kollanyi
- Running time: 28 minutes

Original release
- Network: Channel 9
- Release: July 27, 1984

Danny's Egg is an Australian television film broadcast on the Channel 9 in 1984. It's a story of a boy called Danny (played by Ken Talbot) who finds an emu egg and tries to hatch it.

It was filmed in Tingha, New South Wales in August and September 1983. It was produced as part of a European Broadcasting Union drama exchange. It was the only show accepted by all participating countries from the 14 productions submitted.

Jacqueline Lee Lewes of The Sun-Herald praises the program, calling it "a heart-warming contemporary story with likeable characters" and said "the real strengths of the program are the masterly performances by its young stars." The Age's Jill Morris said "One of the program's major charms is the naturalness and credibility of Danny's school, with its imperfect bush band, its riotous pets' day and gently harassed teacher."

== Awards ==
- Logie Awards of 1985
  - Best Performance by a Juvenile - Ken Talbot - won
- 1984 Prix Jeunesse
  - First Prize
