= Troy (TV series) =

- Presented by: Troy Von Scheibner
- Country of origin: United Kingdom
- Original language: English
- No. of series: 2
- No. of episodes: 10

Production
- Running time: 60 minutes (inc adverts)
- Production companies: Zig Zag Productions Ltd and Motion Content Group

Original release
- Network: E4
- Release: 11 February 2014 – 29 March 2015

Related
- Dynamo: Magician Impossible; Tricked

Troy is a British television series which first started broadcasting on E4 on 11 February 2014. It is presented by magician Troy Von Scheibner, who performs magic to the public. It made its American debut on Syfy 13 January 2015.

On 15 December 2015, a special called Troy: Cyber Hijack was broadcast and featured Troy performing tricks and pranks involving technology.

== Episodes ==
=== Series 1 (2014) ===
No.	Title	Original release date
1	"Episode 1"	11 February 2014
Troy proves that it pays to be nice and does speed dating with a difference.
2	"Episode 2"	18 February 2014
Out on a weekender, Troy wreaks havoc at a football match, goes on a road trip to Bournemouth with his mates and creates a unique way to get across Tower Bridge.
3	"Episode 3"	25 February 2014
In this episode, Troy parties at the Notting Hill Carnival and unleashes some trickery at his old workplace.
4	"Episode 4"	4 March 2014
In this edition, Troy makes mischief at a boat party and stuns the crowd with his mind-reading powers.
5	"Episode 5"	11 March 2014
Troy goes on a shopping spree like no other and causes utter confusion at a funfair.
6	"Best Bits"	18 March 2014
A look back at the best bits from the series.

=== Series 2 (2015) ===
In September 2014, it was confirmed that a second series would be broadcast in 2015. It began on 8 March.

No.	Title	Original release date
1	"Episode 1"	8 March 2015
Troy baffles people at The Natural History Museum and pulls off his spookiest tricks yet.
2	"Episode 2"	15 March 2015
Troy introduces some of his passions via a visit to a table tennis club and a cinema and by stunning spectators on a go-karting trip.
3	"Episode 3"	22 March 2015
Troy is back in Lewisham where he stuns some lads with a trick in the market and diners are treated to a meal they'll never forget in a Japanese restaurant.
4	"Episode 4"	29 March 2015
Troy plays tricks in London on two unsuspecting music lovers in a record shop and in Barcelona where he wows football fans at FC Barcelona's stadium, Camp Nou.

== Broadcast ==
In Australia, the series premiered on GO! on 2 September 2015.
