= Margaret Paice =

Australian children's writer and illustrator (1920–2016)

- Born: Margaret Dawn Cantle; 1 September 1920; Brisbane, Queensland, Australia
- Died: 19 November 2016 (aged 96); Ipswich, Queensland, Australia
- Occupations: Children's writer, commercial artist and book illustrator

Margaret Dawn Paice (1 September 1920 – 19 November 2016) was an Australian children's writer, commercial artist and book illustrator.

== Early life and education ==
Margaret Dawn Cantle was born in Brisbane, Australia on 1 September 1920, daughter of Violet (née Burman) and Sydney Cantle. Paice was raised in rural Queensland and was educated locally and through correspondence schooling, before attending Moreton Bay High School.

== Career ==
Paice had several poems published in The Central Queensland Herald in 1937. In 1942 she married Hubert Whitfield Paice. He died in 1955 and Paice moved to Sydney, where she studied at the National Art School and the Royal Art Society, gaining employment as a commercial artist.

Paice wrote and illustrated her first book, Mirram, in 1955. It was commended in the picture book category of the 1955 Children's Book Council of Australia Book of the Year awards. She provided illustrations for her own and other books published by Angus & Robertson, including three books by Ann E. Wells.

Colour in the Creek was a ten-episode television series adapted from Paice's novel of the same name and Shadow of Wings. It was shown on TCN 9.

In 1960 she married Wilfred Harriss, who died in 1975. She moved to the Blue Mountains in 1969 and later to Queensland.

In 1978 she was interviewed by Hazel de Berg for the National Library of Australia's oral history collection. Her papers, including letters and original artwork, are held by the State Library of New South Wales.

Margaret Paice died in Ipswich, Queensland on 19 November 2016, at the age of 96.

== Selected works ==
=== Author and illustrator ===
==== Fiction ====
- Paice, Margaret (1955), Mirram, Angus and Robertson
- Paice, Margaret (1956), Namitja, Angus and Robertson
- Paice, Margaret (1957), Valley in the north, Angus and Robertson
- Paice, Margaret (1971), The morning glory, Collins
- Paice, Margaret (1972), Run to the mountains, John Ferguson
- Paice, Margaret (1993), Trouble at Turkey Brush, Millennium Books, ISBN 978-0-85574-944-6

==== Trilogy: Colour in the creek ====
- Paice, Margaret (1976), Colour in the creek, Collins, ISBN 978-0-00-185018-7
- Paice, Margaret (1978), Shadow of wings, Collins, ISBN 978-0-00-184369-1
- Paice, Margaret (1986), Applewood, Puffin Books, ISBN 978-0-14-032036-7

==== Nonfiction ====
- Paice, Margaret (1976), Jackey Jackey, Collins, ISBN 978-0-00-195028-3
- Paice, Margaret (1979), Wheels and wings: A history of transport in Australia, Collins, ISBN 978-0-00-195036-8

=== Illustrator ===
- Wells, Ann E. (1959), Tales of Arnhem Land, Paice, Margaret (illustrator), Angus & Robertson
- Wells, Ann E. (1961), Rain in Arnhem Land: Further adventures of three Aboriginal children on the far north coast of Australia, and some of the stories of their people, Paice, Margaret (illustrator), Angus & Robertson
- Morris, Clarice (1961), Wildflowers, Paice, Margaret, Angus and Robertson
- Wells, Ann E. (1964), Skies of Arnhem Land, Paice, Margaret (illustrator), Angus & Robertson
