= Skin Deep (1984 film) =

- Genre: Drama
- Written by: Anne Lucas
- Directed by: Chris Langman; Mark Joffe
- Starring: David Reyne; Briony Behets; Carmen Duncan; Kate Fitzpatrick; James Smilie; Nicole Kidman
- Country of origin: Australia
- Original language: English

Production
- Executive producer: Ian Bradley
- Producer: Stanley Walsh
- Cinematography: Ray Henman
- Editor: Philip Howe
- Running time: 92 minutes
- Production company: PBL Productions

Original release
- Release: 1985

Skin Deep is a 1984 Australian television film produced by PBL Productions for Channel 9. It was directed by Chris Langman and Mark Joffe and stars Briony Behets and Carmen Duncan and features an early appearance by Nicole Kidman.

Set in the fashion industry, it was one of the few Australian films to be set in this milieu and was an attempt to do an Australian Dallas or Dynasty.

== Plot ==
Barbara Kennedy is a successful business woman in the fashion and modelling industry. In the lead up to a fashion designers awards night, her boyfriend Cliff proposes to her. But then she realises that one of her own models is her illegitimate daughter, placed for adoption years earlier. She has a bitchy rival Vanessa. And a murderer is loose.

== Cast ==
- Briony Behets as Barbara Ramsay
- James Smillie as Cliff Hudson
- Bartholomew John as Ray Scott
- Maureen O'Shaughnessy as Jackie Sorensson
- Antoinette Byron as Christina Sorensson
- Carmen Duncan as Vanessa Corey
- Betty Lucas as Betty Kennedy
- David Reyne as Grant Johnson
- Jon Finlayson as Simpson Byrne
- Kate Fitzpatrick as Maggie Peters
- John O'May as Roger Crane
- John Ewart as Billy Harris
- Liz Harris as Emily Sorensson
- Bobby Limb as Compere / Self
- Nicole Kidman as Sheena Henderson
- Alyson Best as Nicki
- Kevin J. Wilson
- Angelo D'Angelo as Brad Miller
