= Macnificent Tour =

2023-2025 comedy tour

- Tour by Michael McIntyre
- Start date: 5 September 2023
- End date: 26 September 2025
- No. of shows: 113 in Europe; 9 in North America; 2 in Africa; 3 in United Arab Emirates; 127 in total

Macnificent was a comedy tour by British comedian Michael McIntyre. The tour began in Bristol at the Bristol Hippodrome on 5 September 2023, and concluded in Geneva, Switzerland at the Geneva Arena on 26 September 2025.

== Background and development ==
Macnificent was announced on 13 February 2023, McIntyre's first tour in 5 years. Tickets for shows around UK & Ireland went on sale 17 February 2023, high demand prompted many extra dates to be added at numerous venues and locations.

Shows were also added in America, Canada, Europe, United Arab Emirates and South Africa.

== Tour dates ==
List of shows, showing date, city, country and venue
Date	City	Country	Venue
5 September 2023	Bristol	England	Bristol Hippodrome
6 September 2023	Bristol	England	Bristol Hippodrome
7 September 2023	Bristol	England	Bristol Hippodrome
8 September 2023	Bristol	England	Bristol Hippodrome
14 September 2023	New York	United States	Beacon Theatre
15 September 2023	New York	United States	Beacon Theatre
16 September 2023	New York	United States	Beacon Theatre
9 October 2023	Bournemouth	England	Bournemouth International Centre
10 October 2023	Bournemouth	England	Bournemouth International Centre
11 October 2023	Bournemouth	England	Bournemouth International Centre
12 October 2023	Bournemouth	England	Bournemouth International Centre
13 October 2023	Bournemouth	England	Bournemouth International Centre
14 October 2023	Bournemouth	England	Bournemouth International Centre
18 October 2023	Brighton	England	Brighton Centre
19 October 2023	Brighton	England	Brighton Centre
25 October 2023	Brighton	England	Brighton Centre
26 October 2023	Brighton	England	Brighton Centre
27 October 2023	Brighton	England	Brighton Centre
28 October 2023	Brighton	England	Brighton Centre
29 October 2023	Brighton	England	Brighton Centre
2 November 2023	Dublin	Ireland	3 Arena
3 November 2023	Dublin	Ireland	3 Arena
4 November 2023	Dublin	Ireland	3 Arena
24 November 2023	Leeds	England	First Direct Arena
25 November 2023	Leeds	England	First Direct Arena
1 December 2023	Swansea	Wales	Swansea Arena
2 December 2023	Cardiff	Wales	Utilita Arena
3 December 2023	Cardiff	Wales	Utilita Arena
7 December 2023	Aalborg	Denmark	Aalborghallen
8 December 2023	Copenhagen	Denmark	Royal Arena
9 December 2023	Stravanger	Norway	DNB Arena
10 December 2023	Oslo	Norway	Spektrum
10 January 2024	Oxford	England	Oxford Playhouse
13 January 2024	Dubai	United Arab Emirates	Coca Cola Arena
1 February 2024	Lichfield	England	Lichfield Garrick
5 February 2024	Antwerp	Belgium	Lotto Arena
6 February 2024	Antwerp	Belgium	Lotto Arena
7 February 2024	Rotterdam	Netherlands	Rotterdam Ahoy
8 February 2024	Rotterdam	Netherlands	Rotterdam Ahoy
23 February 2024	Plymouth	England	Plymouth Pavillions
24 February 2024	Plymouth	England	Plymouth Pavillions
25 February 2024	Plymouth	England	Plymouth Pavillions
26 February 2024	Plymouth	England	Plymouth Pavillions
27 February 2024	Plymouth	England	Plymouth Pavillions
28 February 2024	Plymouth	England	Plymouth Pavillions
29 February 2024	Plymouth	England	Plymouth Pavillions
4 March 2024	Southampton	England	Mayflower Theatre
8 March 2024	Nottingham	England	Motorpoint Arena
9 March 2024	Nottingham	England	Motorpoint Arena
10 March 2024	Nottingham	England	Motorpoint Arena
15 March 2024	Newcastle	England	Utilita Arena
16 March 2024	Newcastle	England	Utilita Arena
22 March 2024	Manchester	England	AO Arena
23 March 2024	Manchester	England	AO Arena
28 March 2024	Brighton	England	Brighton Theatre Royal
4 April 2024	Eastbourne	England	Congress Theatre
5 April 2024	London	England	The O2 Arena
6 April 2024	London	England	The O2 Arena
12 April 2024	London	England	The O2 Arena
13 April 2024	London	England	The O2 Arena
14 April 2024	London	England	The O2 Arena
19 April 2024	Liverpool	England	M&S Bank Arena
20 April 2024	Liverpool	England	M&S Bank Arena
21 April 2024	Southampton	England	Mayflower Theatre
25 April 2024	Hull	England	Connexin Live
26 April 2024	Hull	England	Connexin Live
27 April 2024	Sheffield	England	Utilita Arena
1 May 2024	Cardiff	Wales	Utilita Arena
2 May 2024	Cardiff	Wales	Utilita Arena
3 May 2024	Cardiff	Wales	Utilita Arena
4 May 2024	Cardiff	Wales	Utilita Arena
5 May 2024	Cardiff	Wales	Utilita Arena
10 May 2024	London	England	OVO Arena
11 May 2024	London	England	OVO Arena
15 May 2024	Aberdeen	Scotland	P&J Live
16 May 2024	Aberdeen	Scotland	P&J Live
17 May 2024	Glasgow	Scotland	OVO Hydro
18 May 2024	Glasgow	Scotland	OVO Hydro
19 May 2024	Glasgow	Scotland	OVO Hydro
24 May 2024	Birmingham	England	Utilita Arena
25 May 2024	Birmingham	England	Utilita Arena
26 May 2024	Birmingham	England	Utilita Arena
30 May 2024	Dublin	Ireland	3 Arena
31 May 2024	Belfast	Northern Ireland	SSE Arena
1 June 2024	Belfast	Northern Ireland	SSE Arena
6 August 2024	Oxford	England	Oxford Playhouse
20 August 2024	Cheltenham	England	Everyman Theatre
22 August 2024	Helsinki	Finland	House of Culture
23 August 2024	Helsinki	Finland	House of Culture
24 August 2024	Trondheim	Norway	Olavshallen
25 August 2024	Trondheim	Norway	Olavshallen
30 August 2024	Frankfurt	Germany	Jahrhunderthalle
31 August 2024	Stockholm	Sweden	Waterfront
1 September 2024	Berlin	Germany	Tempodrom
7 September 2024	Birmingham	England	Birmingham Hippodrome
12 September 2024	Pretoria	South Africa	SunBet Arena
13 September 2024	Cape Town	South Africa	GrandWest Arena
20 September 2024	Gibraltar		Europa Sports Arena
21 September 2024	Gibraltar		Europa Sports Arena
22 September 2024	Gibraltar		Europa Sports Arena
26 September 2024	Plymouth	England	Plymouth Pavillions
2 October 2024	Portsmouth	England	Kings Theatre
28 October 2024	London	England	Duchess Theatre
11 November 2024	London	England	Duchess Theatre
17 November 2024	Oslo	Norway	Spektrum
18 November 2024	Gjovik	Norway	Fjellhallen
27 November 2024	Montreal	Canada	Théâtre L'Olympia
28 November 2024	Ottawa	Canada	Arena at TD Place
29 November 2024	Kitchener	Canada	Centre in the Square
30 November 2024	Toronto	Canada	Massey Hall
1 December 2024	Toronto	Canada	Massey Hall
3 December 2024	Boston	United States	Boch Center Schubert Theatre
3 March 2025	London	England	Duchess Theatre
11 March 2025	London	England	Pleasance Theatre
14 March 2025	Ta' Qali	Malta	Malta Fairs & Conventions Centre
15 March 2025	Ta' Qali	Malta	Malta Fairs & Conventions Centre
18 March 2025	Killarney	Ireland	Gleneagle INEC Arena
19 March 2025	Killarney	Ireland	Gleneagle INEC Arena
20 March 2025	Galway	Ireland	Leisureland
21 March 2025	Galway	Ireland	Leisureland
7 May 2025	Halifax	England	Victoria Theatre
10 May 2025	Abu Dhabi	United Arab Emirates	Etihad Arena
25 July 2025	Cork	Ireland	Live at the Marquee
26 July 2025	Cork	Ireland	Live at the Marquee
27 July 2025	Cork	Ireland	Live at the Marquee
2 September 2025	Castlebar	Ireland	TF Royal Theatre
3 September 2025	Castlebar	Ireland	TF Royal Theatre
25 September 2025	Zurich	Switzerland	Hallenstadion
26 September 2025	Geneva	Switzerland	Geneva Arena
