= Professor Poopsnagle's Steam Zeppelin =

- Written by: Bruce Stewart; Betty Quinn; Roger Dunne; Rick Maier; Ken Saunders; Robert Guillemot
- Directed by: Howard Ruby; Russel Webb
- Starring: Gerry Duggan; José María Caffarel; Bill Conn; Ric Hutton; Justine Clarke
- Opening theme: "The Poop Poop Song" by Bob Young (music) and Roger Mirams (lyrics)
- Countries of origin: Australia; France; Netherlands; Spain
- No. of episodes: 24 episodes (in six parts)

Production
- Executive producers: Ian Holmes; Michel Noll
- Producer: Roger Mirams
- Running time: 25 mins (Some networks combined the episodes into the 6 parts of the story)
- Production companies: Grundy Organisation; Revcom Television; Katholieke Radio Omroep; Televisión Española

Original release
- Network: Nine Network
- Release: 1986
- Network: TVE 1
- Release: 18 July 1987 – 30 January 1988
- Network: KRO
- Release: 1989

Professor Poopsnagle's Steam Zeppelin (aka Professor Poopsnaggle and His Flying Zeppelin) is a children's television series, created as a spin-off of Secret Valley. It was produced by the Grundy Organisation from Australia, in association with Revcom Television from France, Katholieke Radio Omroep (KRO) from the Netherlands, and Televisión Española (TVE) from Spain. It was first aired in 1986 on the Nine Network in Australia, in 1987 on TVE 1 in Spain, and in 1989 on KRO in the Netherlands.

The series was also aired in Switzerland (TSI), Finland (1987), Greece (1988, ET1), France (1989, FR3), and Vietnam (1996, VTV3). In contrast to Secret Valley, which was a commercial failure in the United Kingdom when screened there in 1985, Professor Poopsnagle's Steam Zeppelin was hugely successful in the UK, where it was first broadcast in 1987 on the ITV network, and proved so popular that it was also later repeated on Channel 4 in both 1990 and 1998. The series still has a strong cult following in the United Kingdom today. The overall story is divided into 6 parts, each for a particular quest, with 4 episodes each. Some TV channels, such as ITV Anglia, therefore showed the series as TV movies of 90 minutes each. In this form the story is slightly abridged, cutting a few scenes that are present in cut for a half-hour slot.

== Summary ==
Professor Poopsnagle, the holder of a vital scientific secret, has been abducted and his mysterious disappearance jeopardizes the world of science. His young grandson, who assists him in his research, secures the help of Professor Garcia, a long-standing colleague and friend of the scientist. Assisted by a group of children, spending their holidays in the Secret Valley Camp, Professor Garcia and the young boy build a flying bus. They set off in pursuit of the kidnappers and attempt, at the same time, to complete Poopsnagle's unfinished work. They are helped in their quest by a document that Garcia and the children gradually manage to decipher. But alas, there is a traitor in their midst passing information to the evil kidnappers of Professor Poopsnagle: Count Sator and his accomplice. However, against all odds, and throughout countless and often irresistibly amusing adventures, Professor Garcia and his young group of friends finally win the day. Time after time, the children show great courage and skill. Matt, the traitor, sees the error of his ways and they all live happily ever after.

=== Part 1: The Stranger Arrives ===
Dr. Jose Calandre Garcia had been working on the theory of Mega- steam when he lost contact with his old friend Professor Poopsnagle. Determined to continue the work that Poopsnagle had originally begun, Garcia traveled to Australia in a hot air balloon in search of his old friend. Unbeknown to him, however, the evil, wealthy tycoon Count Sator had discovered his plan and sent his henchman Murk to shoot down the hot air balloon. Murk shot down the balloon, but the old doctor survived the crash and was rescued by some young children from a holiday camp in Secret Valley. When they heard the doctor's story of why he had come to Australia, they decided to help him in his quest to find the 6 minerals of Megasteam.

The only contact with Poopsnagle that remained was a telephone number. When Garcia called the number, he got a message machine. He left a message for his old friend to contact him at the Secret Valley holiday camp. Instead of Poopsnagle, Garcia was surprised when a young boy of 12 years old turned up instead. It was none other than Poopsnagle's grandson, Peter. Together they resolved to build a flying bus which was originally designed by Professor Poopsnagle to help them in their search for the minerals.

In a nearby deserted town, the children gathered all sorts of junk to help make the flying contraption. Luckily, they found the wreck of an old bus as the basis of the machine. With the help of the children, and following Poopsnagle's plan, the bus was eventually completed, and based on steam power it was able to rise into the sky and fly at will. Count Sator, however, sent another henchman called Willie Dingle (an intelligent but clumsy and accident-prone electronics expert, who Sator had employed to build, operate and maintain a complex radio communication and computer system) to spy on the children; whilst Sator and Murk were persistent in trying to sabotage Poopsnagle and Garcia's plans, Dingle was a more reluctant accomplice, who was repeatedly bullied and intimidated into co-operation by Sator and Murk. Within the ranks of the children, Sator also commissioned a young boy named Matt to keep him informed.

Poopsnagle's grandson Peter also had an ancient parchment that his grandfather had left him, and on the parchment was a cryptogram written in Latin. After the cryptogram had been decoded, it was only a matter of time before they found the first golden salamander.

The golden salamanders had been buried long ago to indicate where each mineral could be found. After the first one was found, the cryptogram on it would lead the children and the doctor to the next one. What they had to do in each case was to decipher the cryptogram on each salamander. The first one led them to a cave not far from Secret Valley, where after being caught in a mine shaft and surviving a gas explosion, they were able to find their way down the shaft and into an unknown valley where they found the second salamander and the first mineral.

=== Part 2: Island Adventure ===
The cryptogram on the second salamander indicated that the children were to follow the arrow pointing towards the sea. Once they had taken off in the Poopmobile, and were traveling in the right direction, they found themselves caught in a gale. The storm buffeted the bus mercilessly, and after some time in which the doctor had great difficulty in keeping control, the bus eventually came out of the other side of the storm. Seeing an island, they decided to land and check to see if they needed to repair the bus. Once they had landed on the tropical island, they found themselves confronted by a weird sound, and they also discovered footprints of an enormous size which indicated that there was a monster on the island.

The cryptogram of the last salamander, when it was deciphered, turned out to be the island that they were on. Inadvertently the storm had placed them on the correct island, so they decided to split up in various groups to search for the next salamander and the next mineral.

In their search, two of the children were captured by pirates, and Willie Dingle had been flown to the island by Murk to keep an eye on what the children were doing for Count Sator.

With great stealth, the doctor was able to free the two children and in turn Willie Dingle was captured by the pirates. They threw him into quicksand, but one of the children took pity on him when he heard his cries and pulled him out just in time.

Together with Dingle, the doctor and children pressed on to discover the third salamander, after climbing down into a deep ravine, behind a waterfall. And surrounding the salamander was the second mineral.

Once the Poopmobile had been fixed by Peter, the band took off from the island and headed homeward.

=== Part 3: Lost in the Desert ===
After returning to Secret Valley and deciphering the latest cryptogram. Doctor Garcia and the children prepare to search for the Rosy Prize. They know the way they must go, by the predetermined direction on the ancient Torres Parchment. So once more its to the Poopmobile, and away. Dingle however. has been ordered to keep watch, and he reports their departure to Count Sator. Matt helps Dingle in the search for the Poopmobile, with Sator following in his mobile computerised home. Because they have been traveling on the ground. the Poopmobile has left tracks which Dingle and Matt have been following, but when the children realize that they might be followed by their enemies, they take to the air.

Dingle is urged by Sator to use a hang glider to keep an aerial reconnaissance on the Doctor and his band, whilst he and Murk return to the Castle to deal with Poopsnagle, who has somehow escaped from his cell. When Dingle takes to the air in his hang glider, helped by Matt, he crashes, but manages to bring the Poopmobile down using Mats darts to burst the hot air balloon.

The children narrowly escape injury, but their precious Bus has been badly damaged. They have lost all the water from the steam turbine and it has evaporated away into the heat and sand.

Jamie believes he must prove to himself that he has the ability to use his bushman's knowledge to find water in the desert, and he takes Shorty and Sparks with him on a journey into the wild desert. He manages to survive the ordeal, but the two others are badly affected by the lack of water. and it is only the appearance of a traveling actor, Mr. Use-to-Was. who saves the boys from dire circumstances. Emanuel, M. Use-to-Was's camel brings the boys back to the camp, much to the relief of the old Doctor. Using the pulleys from the Bus, the children are able to pull it out of the sand with the help of the valiant camel. Now Jamie can use some plastic to help absorb the escaped water from beneath the bus. He shows the others how this is done, using the heat of the sun.

Meanwhile, Matt, who feels guilty at the children having no water. takes a large container from his own camp to the Poopmobile, under the cover of night. Jamie, who is sleeping under the bus, sees him do this, and the next morning all the children are amazed to see the container filled with the precious liquid.

When Sator returns to his comp, he berates Dingle and Matt for having lost the water, and commands them to raid the Poopmobile's camp. They do this at night, but are frightened out of their wits by Jamie, who has painted himself in ceremonial paint to commune with the spirits. He is trying to use his Aboriginal dream time powers to bring the rain. Whilst the Doctor and children are out looking for Jamie, Sator manages to raid the Poopmobile and steal the Doctors notes on Mega Steam. The Doctor and Children are devastated. The next morning the rains come in torrents. The children gather the water to fill the fixed steam accumulator. Eventually they are airborne once more, but Count Sator has become bogged in the desert.

It is Carmen who realizes that they are staring at the Rosy Prize and after a wind storm which whips some of the Doctor's notes away from Sator, the children not only find the Rosy Prize, but the Salamander as well. They gather the notes which are flying in the wind, and are more than relieved to see Use-to-Was with the remaining notes which he has found in Sator's van. He tells them that he has swapped his camel for the comfort of Sator's vehicle, whilst the villain wasn't looking. The Doctor and children return to Secret Valley, victorious, and we see Sator riding the camel, followed by Murk Dingle and a remorseful Matt.

=== Part 4: Commando Raid ===
In the barn at Secret Valley, the doctor and children decode the latest cryptogram. Matt however is listening outside and when the others leave the barn, he creeps inside and takes a copy of the decoded message. He is disturbed by the others, but not before he has planted a listening bug under the table, which Dingle is tuned in to, nearby. The lookout sees Dingle's car and Sparks decides to investigate. He discovers Dingle and learns that the barn is bugged. He runs back to warn the others. They find the bug and send Dingle in a different direction by giving him a false lead.

The doctor and children leave the camp to search for the next salamander and mineral. Followed by Murk in disguise, they make their way to a fishing village where two of the children are trapped in the hold of a ferry. Murk kidnaps Doctor Garcia and takes him to the castle, where Sator interrogates him and then throws him into a cell, not far from Poopsnagle himself. They do not know that they are so close to each other.

The children suspect that the Doctor has been captured and enlist the help of the police to question Sator. Sator is very helpful and allows them to search the dungeons, but they do not find a thing. Poopsnagle has escaped once more and, as the door to allow the police to leave opens automatically, Poopsnagle takes his chance and runs out; but Sator soon recaptures the old man once more.

The children mount a night raid on the castle to find Garcia, as they are convinced that he is in the dungeons. They find Garcia (but not Poopsnagle, as they do not realise that he is also in the dungeons), however Sator traps them in the tidal cell, where the tide will eventually drown them. Matt, however, has been following their movements and he is able to help the children escape from a high air grate. The Poopmobile is hovering overhead, and they scramble aboard with the help of the ladder. Sator is furious, but powerless to stop them.

Once free, the Doctor and children fly to the island "which is joined by sand". This is part of the cryptogram, and they sight it from the air. When they land, they soon find the salamander and mineral with the help of a metal detector. Successful again, they head for home to decipher the next cryptogram.

=== Part 5: Race to the Finish ===
The story begins with the children already on their way to their next destination. They have to find a bend in a river in the shape of an M. The River is in a northerly direction from their camp, and as they are flying, they see a bush fire in the distance and some people in distress. They land and rescue a man and a woman and some small animals. The woman is desperate for them to go after her daughter, who has left the farm in search of her horse Victory Stride. After dropping them off at the nearby town of Rivers Bend, the children search for Alice, the missing girl. They find her, and Carmen helps her by staying with her whilst the Poopmobile gives them directions from above. They escape the fire, and Sparks, back at Secret Valley, helps the situation by warning the nearby towns of Rivers Bend's distress. He also discovers the location of the salamander inadvertently, and is able to pass the information to the Doctor. The latest salamander has been attached to the Jambaroo Shield, a trophy which is to be presented to the winner of a horse race called the Jambaroo Shield stakes. The children decide to enter the race with Victory Stride as their champion, but he needs a trainer.

Dingle has been sent to buy all the other horses off; Sator wants to win the race for himself. He purchases a horse called Black Eye, and a jockey. Dingle then keeps an eye on the children and sees them searching for the mineral along the river.

It transpires that old Sid Chesney, a horse-trainer the children have been able to persuade to train their horse, also knows of the whereabouts of the fifth mineral, for he was the person who found the Salamander originally. After they have the mineral safely in their possession, they are about to go to the race when they find that their bus has been sabotaged by Murk who has sawn the drive shaft through. Race day arrives and Sator is filled with rage to see the Poopmobile flying to the race course, with Victory Stride slung underneath it. Sid Chesney has trained the horse well, and although Alice cannot ride it herself, because of an accident, Jamie has been prepared for the ordeal.

The race begins, and Dingle tries to send Jamie in a different direction by planting a confusing sign on the course. Sators jockey throws dirt in Jamie's face, and tries to push him from the horse. But Jamie hangs on, and even though Sator has planted a fresh horse on the track, Jamie still wins the race, with a little last moment help from Sid. The Salamander is theirs, but they are horrified to find that there is no cryptogram on it. And to make matters worse, Dingle has planted a vision bug on the Poopmobile which even Matt is unaware of.

=== Part 6: The Last Mineral ===
In the Poopmobile as they return from their last adventure, Peter uses an old trick to divulge the secret of the last Salamanders cryptogram. At the base camp, they decipher the coded message and to their amazement they discover that the last mineral is positioned underneath the Sydney Opera House. How are they going to find it?

Sator is heartily amused as he can see their every move on the vision bug, and he gloats in front of a terrified Poopsnagle. Sator has also arranged for Matt to let Dingle and Murk into Secret Valley late one night to take the minerals and Salamanders from the safe in the barn. Blackmailing Matt into helping him get the Doctor's notes, Sator now has all he needs to make Mega Steam. Despite his contributions in getting the notes and minerals, however, Dingle is vilified by Sator for the vision bug being destroyed after the raid, although both are unaware that the children discovered the bug and smashed it on purpose; already angry and frustrated by Sator and Murk continually blaming him for mishaps beyond his control, Dingle becomes increasingly alienated and turns against Sator, who tells him he is dismissed from his post, and that he was useless and had no value to Sator's mission, leaving Dingle feeling humiliated and dejected.

Meanwhile, in a kangaroo court back at Secret Valley, the children try a very despondent Matt, who tries to convince them that he has a plan to retrieve the booty from Sator. At first the children and the doctor are unwilling to listen, but when they realize that they do not have a plan without Matt's help, they decide to give him a last chance. Sator has given Matt a vision communicator designed by Dingle as his payment for letting the enemy into Secret Valley. He uses this communicator to contact Sator to record his voice, which they need to fool the computer that guards his castle. But to get into the castle, they have to somehow convince Sator to leave. Divina Devaga works in the department of antiquities in a museum in Sydney. Sator has never met the woman, although he knows she has a thick European accent. With the aid of Peter Poopsnagle's voice simulator, and a bit of make up, Carmen poses as the mysterious Divina, and fools Sator completely. Whilst she is dining with him at Roberto's Restaurant, the others reclaim the minerals, notes and Salamanders from Sator's strong hold. But Sator returns before they have finished and captures Peter Poopsnagle. This is when Peter is cruelly reunited with his grandfather.

Undaunted, the doctor and children go to the Opera House, where they are successful in discovering that the final mineral is water. Back at the doctor's laboratory, they are working on the Mega Steam problem when Sator contacts them on Matt's communicator. He tells the doctor that unless he gets the notes back by the next morning, they will never see Peter or his grandfather again. Garcia concedes victory to Sator, but after the communication, he is successful in developing a small amount of Mega Steam. It is with this amount of Mega Steam in the Poopmobile that they are able to pull the side wall of Sator's computer room out and save Peter and Professor Poopsnagle from the jaws of Baby Julius, Sator's fiendish caged pet. After having dismissed Dingle, who was last seen angrily walking out of the castle after his earlier altercation with Sator and Murk, Sator arrives on the scene just as the professor, doctor and children escape with their precious cargo, and is forced to watch in disbelief, completely powerless to stop them as they depart in the zeppelin. Sator then notices that he has Murk's radio handset, but that Murk himself is missing - and that Baby Julius is no longer in his cage. Suddenly realising that he is alone, unprotected, and cornered, Sator makes a desperate attempt to contact Dingle for help on the radio, only to get static in reply, followed by the radio going to a dead signal – just as he himself meets a sticky end at Baby Julius' jaws (it is not conclusively shown whether Dingle, fed up with his constant poor treatment at Sator's hands, simply deliberately ignored Sator's final plea for help and then intentionally cut off the radio signal, or if Dingle had simply moved out of range by then after he walked out). Murk's fate is left unrevealed; it is assumed he fled when he realised that Sator's situation was hopeless. Regardless, the secret of Mega Steam is intact for the Geneva Convention to be used in the cause of a pollution-free world. The Poopmobile is now free to fly on to other adventures.

== Characters ==
- Professor Poopsnagle (Gerry Duggan)
- Carmen (Justine Clarke)
- Matt (Kelan Angel)
- Peter (Philip Henville)
- Mike (Marc Gray)
- Jamie (Rory Bromhead)
- Sparks (Mark Kazuhiro Pearce)
- Robyn (Melissa Kounnas)
- Doctor García (José María Caffarel)
- Willie Dingle (Bill Conn)
- Count Sator (Ric Hutton)
- Murk (Ron Blanchard)
- Shorty (Ken Talbot)
- Joanne (Tonya Wright)
- Used-to-Was (Leonard Teale)
- Alice (Kym Wilson)
- Blaggard (Roger Ward)

== Bibliography ==
- Revcom/Grundy Organization "Professor Poopsnagle's Steam Zeppelin : Prospectus" (1986)
