= 17th National Television Awards =

British awards ceremony in 2012

- Date: 25 January 2012
- Location: The O2 Arena, London
- Country: United Kingdom
- Presented by: Various
- Hosted by: Dermot O'Leary
- Website: nationaltvawards.com

Television/radio coverage
- Network: ITV (Main show); ITV2 (Awards party)

The 17th National Television Awards was held on 25 January 2012. The main awards show was presented by Dermot O'Leary live from The O2 Arena on ITV, whilst the after party was covered by Caroline Flack on ITV2.

== Performances ==
- Bruce Forsyth, Anthony McPartlin and Declan Donnelly – "Let There Be Love"
- Little Mix (X Factor 2011 finalists) – "Don't Let Go (Love)"
- Military Wives – "Make You Feel My Love"

== Awards ==
Category Presenters	Winner	Nominated
Outstanding Serial Drama Performance; Presented by Lara Pulver	Katherine Kelly (Becky McDonald, Coronation Street)	Jessie Wallace (Kat Slater, EastEnders); Danny Miller (Aaron Livesy, Emmerdale); Alison King (Carla Connor, Coronation Street)
Outstanding Drama Performance (Male); Presented by Caroline Quentin	Matt Smith (Doctor Who)	Martin Clunes (Doc Martin); John Barrowman (Torchwood: Miracle Day); David Threlfall (Shameless)
Outstanding Drama Performance (Female); Presented by Hugh Bonneville	Karen Gillan (Doctor Who)	Jaye Jacobs (Waterloo Road); Suranne Jones (Scott & Bailey); Eve Myles (Torchwood: Miracle Day)
Talk Show; Presented by Thierry Henry	Alan Carr: Chatty Man (Channel 4)	The Graham Norton Show (BBC One); Loose Women (ITV1); The Jonathan Ross Show (ITV1)
Most Popular Drama; Presented by Military Wives	Downton Abbey (ITV1)	Waterloo Road (BBC One); Doctor Who (BBC One); Merlin (BBC One)
Most Popular Serial Drama; Presented by Paul O'Grady	Coronation Street (ITV1)	EastEnders (BBC One); Emmerdale (ITV1); Hollyoaks (Channel 4)
Most Popular Reality Programme; Presented by will.i.am	I'm a Celebrity...Get Me Out of Here! (ITV1)	Come Dine with Me (Channel 4); The Apprentice (BBC One); The Only Way Is Essex (ITV2)
Most Popular Entertainment Programme; Presented by Tulisa Contostavlos	Michael McIntyre's Comedy Roadshow (BBC One)	Harry Hill's TV Burp (ITV1); Take Me Out (ITV1); Dynamo: Magician Impossible (Watch)
Most Popular Entertainment Presenter; Presented by Kermit the Frog	Ant & Dec	Keith Lemon; Dermot O'Leary; Michael McIntyre
Most Popular Talent Show; Presented by Elle Macpherson	The X Factor (ITV1)	Dancing On Ice (ITV1); Britain's Got Talent (ITV1); Strictly Come Dancing (BBC One)
Most Popular Situation Comedy Programme; Presented by Richard Wilson	Outnumbered (BBC One)	Benidorm (ITV1); Miranda (BBC One)
Most Popular Factual Programme; Presented by Hilary Devey	This Morning (ITV1)	Top Gear (BBC Two); An Idiot Abroad (Sky 1); Big Fat Gypsy Weddings (Channel 4)
Most Popular Newcomer; Presented by Mark Wright	Jacqueline Jossa (Lauren Branning, EastEnders)	Chelsea Halfpenny (Amy Wyatt, Emmerdale); Chris Fountain (Tommy Duckworth, Coronation Street)
Most Popular Comedy Panel Show; Presented by Russell Kane	Celebrity Juice (ITV2)	QI (BBC Two); Have I Got News for You (BBC One); Mock the Week (BBC Two)
Landmark Achievement; Presented by Dermot O'Leary	David Walliams	
Outstanding Contribution to Charity; Presented by Chris Moyles	Gary Barlow	
Special Recognition; Presented by Bruce Forsyth	Jonathan Ross	

=== Longlist ===
The following is a list of programmes and people that did not make it past the 'Longlist' voting stage, which occurred between September and December 2011. Beside them is the percentage of votes they received.

- Talent Show:
1. "Popstar to Operastar": 9.8%
2. "Let's Dance for Comic Relief": 5.5%
3. "Got To Dance": 3.2%
4. "So You Think You Can Dance": 1.6%
- Comedy Panel Show:
1. "8 Out of 10 Cats": 7.9%
2. "Odd One In": 6.8%
3. "Pointless": 4.5%
4. "Would I Lie To You?": 1.0%
- Talk Show:
1. "Paul O'Grady Live": 10.2%
2. "Piers Morgan's Life Stories": 7.9%
3. "The Alan Titchmarsh Show": 3.4%
4. "The Wright Stuff": 3.0%
5. "The Rob Brydon Show": 1.9%
6. "That Sunday Night Show": 1.3%
- Situation Comedy:
1. "Mrs Brown's Boys": 15.2%
2. "Come Fly With Me": 9.8%
3. "My Family": 7.2%
4. "Candy Cabs": 4.8%
5. "Not Going Out": 3.2%
6. "Reggie Perrin": 2.8%
7. "Trollied": 1.9%
8. "Whites": 1.3%
9. "Friday Night Dinner": 0.7%
10. "In With The Flynns": 0.4%
- Serial Drama:
1. "Neighbours": 7.6%
2. "Home and Away": 3.4%
3. "Doctors": 2.6%
- Reality Programme:
1. "Celebrity Big Brother": 13.5%
2. "Coach Trip": 9.5%
3. "Peter Andre: The Next Chapter": 6.8%
4. "Don't Tell The Bride": 3.4%
5. "Made In Chelsea": 3.2%
6. "71 Degrees North": 1.6%
- Newcomer:
1. "Danny Mac - Hollyoaks": 10.6%
2. "Jimmy Akingbola - Holby City": 7.8%
3. "William Beck - Casualty": 5.6%
- Drama: (no percentage revealed)
1. "Above Suspicion"
2. "Case Histories"
3. "Casualty"
4. "DCI Banks"
5. "Doc Martin"
6. "Holby City"
7. "Hustle"
8. "Inspector George Gently"
9. "Kidnap and Ransom"
10. "Lark Rise to Candleford"
11. "Law & Order: UK"
12. "Lewis"
13. "Luther"
14. "Midsomer Murders"
15. "Monroe"
16. "New Tricks"
17. "Scott & Bailey"
18. "Shameless"
19. "Silent Witness"
20. "Silk"
21. "South Riding"
22. "Spooks"
23. "The Shadow Line"
24. "Torchwood"
25. "Upstairs Downstairs"
26. "Vera"
27. "Waking The Dead"
28. "Whitechapel"
29. "Wild At Heart"
- Drama Performance: Male: (no percentage revealed)
1. "Ciarán Hinds - Above Suspicion"
2. "Jason Isaacs - Case Histories"
3. "Ben Turner - Casualty"
4. "Stephen Tompkinson - DCI Banks"
5. "Brendan Coyle - Downton Abbey"
6. "Dan Stevens - Downton Abbey"
7. "Guy Henry - Holby City"
8. "Adrian Lester - Hustle"
9. "Martin Shaw - Inspector George Gently"
10. "Trevor Eve - Kidnap and Ransom"
11. "Jamie Bamber - Law & Order: UK"
12. "Bradley Walsh - Law & Order: UK"
13. "Laurence Fox - Lewis"
14. "Kevin Whately - Lewis"
15. "Idris Elba - Luther"
16. "Colin Morgan - Merlin"
17. "Bradley James - Merlin"
18. "Neil Dudgeon - Midsomer Murders"
19. "James Nesbitt - Monroe"
20. "Alun Armstrong - New Tricks"
21. "James Bolam - New Tricks"
22. "Dennis Waterman - New Tricks"
23. "David Morrissey - South Riding"
24. "Peter Firth - Spooks"
25. "Stephen Rea - The Shadow Line"
26. "Ed Stoppard - Upstairs Downstairs"
27. "Alec Newman - Waterloo Road"
28. "Rupert Penry-Jones - Whitechapel"
29. "Phil Davis - Whitechapel"
- Drama Performance: Female: (no percentage revealed)
1. "Kelly Reilly - Above Suspicion"
2. "Georgia Taylor - Casualty"
3. "Caroline Catz - Doc Martin"
4. "Joanne Froggatt - Downton Abbey"
5. "Michelle Dockery - Downton Abbey"
6. "Laila Rouass - Holby City"
7. "Kelly Adams - Hustle"
8. "Julia Sawalha - Lark Rise to Candleford"
9. "Freema Agyeman - Law & Order: UK"
10. "Katie McGrath - Merlin"
11. "Sarah Parish - Monroe"
12. "Amanda Redman - New Tricks"
13. "Lesley Sharp - Scott & Bailey"
14. "Sally Carman - Shameless"
15. "Emilia Fox - Silent Witness"
16. "Maxine Peake - Silk"
17. "Anna Maxwell Martin - South Riding"
18. "Nicola Walker - Spooks"
19. "Keeley Hawes - Upstairs Downstairs"
20. "Brenda Blethyn - Vera"
21. "Tara Fitzgerald - Waking The Dead"
22. "Dawn Steele - Wild At Heart"
- Factual Programme: (no percentage revealed)
1. "Antiques Roadshow"
2. "BBC Breakfast"
3. "Billy Connolly's Route 66"
4. "Britain's Hidden Heritage"
5. "Countryfile"
6. "Crimewatch"
7. "Daybreak"
8. "DIY SOS: The Big Build"
9. "Human Planet"
10. "Inside The Human Body"
11. "Long Lost Family"
12. "Lost Land of the Tiger"
13. "Masterchef"
14. "Ocean Giants"
15. "Royal Navy Caribbean Patrol"
16. "Strangeways"
17. "The Biggest Loser"
18. "The One Show"
19. "Turn Back Time - The High Street"
20. "Watchdog"
21. "Who Do You Think You Are?"
- Serial Drama Performance: (no percentage revealed)

Coronation Street

1. "Andrew Lancel"
2. "Chris Gascoyne"
3. "Jane Danson"
4. "Simon Gregson"

EastEnders

1. "Jake Wood"
2. "Lindsey Coulson"
3. "Nina Wadia"
4. "Nitin Ganatra"
5. "Steve McFadden"

Emmerdale

1. "Charley Webb"
2. "Jeff Hordley"
3. "Lucy Pargeter"
4. "Pauline Quirke"
5. "Steve Halliwell"

Hollyoaks

1. "Claire Cooper"
2. "Emmett J Scanlan"
3. "Jonny Clarke"
4. "Kieron Richardson"
5. "Rachel Shenton"
6. "Stephanie Davis"
- Entertainment Programme: (no percentage revealed)
1. "All Star Family Fortunes"
2. "Ant & Dec's Push The Button"
3. "Celebrity Mastermind"
4. "John Bishop's Britain"
5. "Lee Mack's All Star Cast"
6. "Live At The Apollo"
7. "New You've Been Framed!"
8. "Red or Black?"
9. "Sing If You Can"
10. "The Chase"
11. "The Cube"
12. "The Magicians"
13. "The Million Pound Drop"
14. "The National Lottery: In It To Win It"
15. "Tonight's The Night"
16. "Total Wipeout"
17. "University Challenge"
18. "Who Wants To Be A Millionaire?"
- Entertainment Presenter: (no percentage revealed)
1. "Adrian Chiles"
2. "Alan Carr"
3. "Alex Jones"
4. "Bradley Walsh"
5. "Bruce Forsyth"
6. "Cat Deeley"
7. "Chris Tarrant"
8. "Dale Winton"
9. "Davina McCall"
10. "Fearne Cotton"
11. "Graham Norton"
12. "Harry Hill"
13. "Holly Willoughby"
14. "James May"
15. "Jeremy Clarkson"
16. "John Barrowman"
17. "John Bishop"
18. "Jonathan Ross"
19. "Lee Mack"
20. "Lenny Henry"
21. "Myleene Klass"
22. "Paddy McGuinness"
23. "Paul O'Grady"
24. "Phillip Schofield"
25. "Piers Morgan"
26. "Richard Hammond"
27. "Rob Brydon"
28. "Steve Jones"
29. "Tess Daly"
30. "Vernon Kay"
