= Logie Awards of 1985 =

27th Logie Awards
- Date: 26 April 1985
- Site: World Trade Centre, Melbourne, Victoria
- Hosted by: Greg Evans

Highlights
- Gold Logie: Rowena Wallace
- Hall of Fame: Ken G. Hall
- Most awards: A Country Practice (5)

Television coverage
- Network: Network Ten

The 27th Annual TV Week Logie Awards was held on Friday 26 April 1985 at the World Trade Centre in Melbourne, and broadcast on Network Ten. The ceremony was hosted by Greg Evans. Guests included Anne Baxter, Larry Hagman, Linda Gray, Pamela Bellwood, Jane Badler, Melody Thomas, James Brolin, Andrew Stevens and Mel Blanc.

== Winners and nominees ==
Winners are listed first and highlighted in bold.

=== Gold Logie ===
Most Popular Personality on Australian Television
- **Rowena Wallace for Sons and Daughters (Seven Network)**
  - Greg Evans for Perfect Match (Network Ten)
  - Daryl Somers for Hey Hey It's Saturday (Nine Network)
  - Mike Walsh for The Mike Walsh Show (Nine Network)

=== Acting/Presenting ===
Most Popular Australian Lead Actor	Most Popular Australian Lead Actress
**Grant Dodwell for A Country Practice (Seven Network)**; Shane Porteous for A Country Practice (Seven Network); Shane Withington for A Country Practice (Seven Network)	**Anne Tenney for A Country Practice (Seven Network)**; Penny Cook for A Country Practice (Seven Network); Rowena Wallace for Sons and Daughters (Seven Network)
Best Lead Actor	Best Lead Actress
**Jack Thompson for Waterfront (Network Ten)**	**Greta Scacchi for Waterfront (Network Ten)**
Best Supporting Actor in a Miniseries or Telemovie	Best Supporting Actress in a Miniseries or Telemovie
**Max Cullen for The Last Bastion (Network Ten)**	**Noni Hazlehurst for Waterfront (Network Ten)**
Best Lead Actor in a Series	Best Lead Actress in a Series
**Shane Withington for A Country Practice (Seven Network)**	**Rowena Wallace for Sons and Daughters (Seven Network)**
Best Supporting Actor in a Series	Best Supporting Actress in a Series
**Ian Rawlings for Sons and Daughters (Seven Network)**	**Wendy Strehlow for A Country Practice (Seven Network)**; Gerda Nicolson for Prisoner (Network Ten); Christine Amor for Carson's Law (Network Ten)
Best Performance by a Juvenile	Best New Talent in Australia
**Ken Talbot for Danny's Egg (Nine Network)**; Robert Summers for Prisoner (Network Ten)	**David Reyne for Sweet and Sour (ABC)**; Greg Evans for Perfect Match (Network Ten); Julie Nihill for Bodyline (Network Ten)
TV Reporter of the Year	Special Award for Outstanding Contribution to the Australian Music Industry and Encouragement of Talent
**Mike Munro for Willesee (Seven Network)**	**Ian "Molly" Meldrum**

=== Most Popular Programs ===
Most Popular Australian Drama Program	Most Popular Australian Variety Program
**A Country Practice (Seven Network)**; Prisoner (Network Ten); Sons and Daughters (Seven Network)	**The Mike Walsh Show (Nine Network)**; Hey Hey It's Saturday (Nine Network)
Most Popular Australian Comedy Program	Most Popular Australian Games or Quiz Program
**Hey Hey It's Saturday (Nine Network)**; The Gillies Report (ABC); Kingswood Country (Seven Network)	**Perfect Match (Network Ten)**; Sale of the Century (Nine Network)
Most Popular Australian Current Affairs Program	Most Popular Australian Documentary Program
**60 Minutes (Nine Network)**; Willesee (Nine Network)	**Willesee Documentaries (Network Ten)**; John Laws' World (Network Ten)
Most Popular Australian Children's Program
**Simon Townsend's Wonder World (Network Ten)**; Wombat (Seven Network)

=== Best/Outstanding Programs ===
Best Single Miniseries or Telemovie	Best Documentary
**Waterfront (Network Ten)**	**Frontline Afghanistan (ABC)**
Best Special Events Telecast	Best News Report
**1984 Summer Olympics (Network Ten)**	"**Bank Siege**" **(Seven Network)**
Outstanding Public Affairs Report	Outstanding Coverage of Sport
**"The Education of Stephen Lusher", 60 Minutes (Nine Network)**	**James Hardie 1000 (Seven Network)**
Most Outstanding Contribution by a Regional Station	Special Award for Sustained Excellence
**Autumn Faces (GMV6, Shepparton)**	**Receiver: 60 Minutes (Nine Network)**

== Performers ==
- Ricky May
- Marcia Hines
- Debra Byrne

== Hall of Fame ==
After a lifetime in the Australian television industry, Ken G. Hall became the second inductee into the TV Week Logies Hall of Fame.
