= Ken Talbot (actor) =

Australian actor

- Occupation: Actor
- Years active: 1983–1998

Ken Talbot is an Australian actor. He won the 1985 Logie Award for Performance by a juvenile for his performance in Danny's Egg.

Talbot played lead roles of Danny in Danny's Egg, and Alec Fletcher in Colour in the Creek. He played the main character in The Other Facts of Life episode of the anthology series Winners and featured in Professor Poopsnagle's Steam Zeppelin.
