= Seeing Is Believing Tour =

Tour by English magician Dynamo, 2015–2018

Dynamo Seeing Is Believing
- Company: Inner Circle Films; Phil Mcintrye Productions; Frontier Touring; Mushroom Group
- Genre: Magic
- Location: Worldwide

Creative team
- Director: Tom Caruso
- Creative Producer: Dan Albion
- Frontier Touring Director: Michael Harrison
- Mushroom Group, CEO: Michael Gudinski
- Designer: Ric Lipson
- Creative Consultants: Paul Kieve; Luke Jermay; Harry De Cruz; Rory Adams; Tom Elderfield; Robert Pound
- Lighting Designer: Tim Lutkin
- Video Creative Director: Mark Hough
- Video Producer: Sam Pattinson
- Sound Designer: Rory Madden
- Music Director: Nicholas A Phillips
- Production Manager: Matt Towell
- Video Content and Direction: Alex Hartman; Amer Iqbal
- Tour Photographer: Andrew Timms

Other information
- Tour Manager: Gordon Issacs (UK); Adam Painter (Aus)
- Production Manager: Andy Gibbs
- Stage Management: Stuart Tucker (UK); Adam Painter; Kelly Butterfield (UK); Gary Young (UK); Darren Davidson (Aus); Clare Hill (Aus); Rosie Gilbert (Aus); Anneka Baughan (Aus)
- Personal Assistant: Charis Platford; Sarah Nicholls

Seeing Is Believing was a live tour by English magician Dynamo. The tour was initially billed as a run of UK dates in late 2015, beginning at the O2 Apollo, Manchester, visiting London, Glasgow, Edinburgh, Nottingham, Birmingham and Leeds.

Frayne's ambitions for the show were high, commenting to the press that “[he was] hoping that like [he] did for magic on TV, [he could] reinvent the live magic show and produce something fans [had] never seen before.”

Following high demand for tickets, the tour was extended to a three years and 145 dates across 3 continents, where he sold over 750,000 tickets and filled arenas across the UK, Australia, South Africa and New Zealand.

As part of the tour, Dynamo became the first magician in history to headline The O2, London.

== Dynamo Live at the O2 ==
In March 2016, Dynamo played three sold-out shows at The O2, London. In doing so, he became the first magician to headline the venue. To mark the occasion, Dynamo worked with TV channel Watch, with whom he had created his TV show Dynamo: Magician Impossible, to bring his live show to TV screens across the United Kingdom.

Dynamo Live at The O2 followed Frayne as he embarked on the biggest live magic performance in British history. The show was broadcast live across the UK on Watch.

== Tour ==
=== 2015 ===
==== UK ====
Date	Venue	City
6 October – 18 October	O2 Apollo	Manchester, England
22 October – 8 November	Eventim Apollo	London
19 November – 22 November	SECC Clyde Auditorium	Glasgow, Scotland
25 November – 29 November	Playhouse	Edinburgh, Scotland
2 December – 6 December	Capital FM Arena	Nottingham, England
9 December – 13 December	Barclaycard Arena	Birmingham, England
16 December – 20 December	First Direct Arena	Leeds, England

=== 2016 ===
==== UK ====
Date	Venue	City
27 January – 31 January	Brighton Centre	Brighton, England
3 February – 7 February	Motorpoint Arena	Cardiff, Wales
10 February – 14 February	Bournemouth International Centre	Bournemouth, England
18 February – 21 February	Metro Radio Arena	Newcastle, England
24 February – 28 February	Motorpoint Arena	Sheffield, England
2 March – 6 March	Echo Arena	Liverpool, England
9 March – 13 March	The SSE Arena	Belfast, Northern Ireland
16 March – 20 March	3Arena	Dublin, Ireland
23 March – 24 March	First Direct Arena	Leeds, England
26 March – 27 March	Barclaycard Arena	Birmingham, England
29 March – 30 March	The O2	London
1 April – 2 April	Manchester Arena	Manchester, England

==== Australia ====
Date	Venue	City
5 November – 6 November	Qudos Bank Arena	Sydney, Australia
8 November – 9 November	Entertainment Centre	Brisbane, Australia
12 November – 13 November	Rod Laver Arena	Melbourne
16 November – 17 November	Entertainment Centre	Adelaide, Australia
21 November – 24 November	Perth Arena	Perth, Australia

=== 2018 ===
==== South Africa ====
Date	Venue	City
11 May – 13 May	Sun Arena	Pretoria
18 May – 19 May	GrandWest Grand Arena	Cape Town

==== New Zealand ====
Date	Venue	City
20 July – 21 July	Horncastle Arena	Christchurch
23 July - 24 July	TSB Arena	Wellington
26 July – 29 July	Spark Arena	Auckland
