= Michael McIntyre's Big Show =

British variety and stand-up comedy television series

- Genre: Comedy; Entertainment; Variety; Music
- Created by: Michael McIntyre
- Written by: Michael McIntyre; Henry Paker
- Directed by: Chris Howe
- Presented by: Michael McIntyre
- Voices of: Michael McIntyre (host)
- Theme music composer: Paul Farrer
- Opening theme: "Michael McIntyre's Big Show"
- Ending theme: "Michael McIntyre's Big Show"
- Composer: Paul Farrer
- Country of origin: United Kingdom
- Original language: English
- No. of series: 9
- No. of episodes: 59 plus 2 compilation specials

Production
- Executive producers: Claire Horton; Daniel Baldwin; Ed de Burgh
- Producers: James Pratt; Christian Fletcher; Ed Daggett; Sonal Patel (series 1–2); Carol Baffour-Awuah (series 2–)
- Production locations: Theatre Royal, Drury Lane, London (2015–2018, 2023–); London Palladium, London (2019)
- Editors: Steve Andrews; Jamie Shemeld; Bex Murray (series 1–2)
- Running time: 50–60 minutes
- Production company: Hungry Bear Media

Original release
- Network: BBC One
- Release: 25 December 2015 – present

Michael McIntyre's Big Show is a British variety and stand-up comedy television series, presented by British comedian Michael McIntyre, and broadcast by BBC One. The show was originally a one-off Christmas special in 2015, Michael McIntyre's Big Christmas Show, before the BBC announced that they had ordered a full series in 2016. It premiered on 16 April of that year, and concluded on 28 May 2016.

The show features celebrity guests, musical performances, comedy sketches from McIntyre and guest comics. The show was initially recorded at the Theatre Royal, Drury Lane in London. The series was well received by the public and BBC One renewed the show for a second series which began airing November 2016, concluding in a Christmas special, which was broadcast on Christmas Eve 2016.

The show was commissioned for a third series to air in 2017, which ran for 6 episodes from 18 November. The series finished with its Christmas special on Christmas Eve. It was then announced in December 2017 that the show was renewed for a fourth series that aired in 2018. A fifth series aired in 2019 and was filmed at The London Palladium. Following a break during the COVID-19 pandemic, it returned on 14 January 2023.

== Items and game segments ==
Each episode of Michael McIntyre's Big Show includes a game segment or an item involving a celebrity or an unexpecting member of the public.

Regular segments (as of March 2025)
Segment	Information
Send to All	Send to All (also known as Celebrity Send to All) is a game in the show, which involves McIntyre taking a celebrity's phone and sending a usually awkward text message to all of his or her contacts; at the end of the show, Michael checks the celebrity's phone to see what replies have come through from the contacts. Celebrities that have appeared in this segment include presenter Holly Willoughby, comedian Bradley Walsh, pop stars Cheryl and Olly Murs, former footballer Alan Shearer, Italian dancer and Strictly Come Dancing judge Bruno Tonioli and actors Danny Dyer and Michael Sheen.
Unexpected Star of the Show	A member of the public who has no idea they are to appear on the show are told to come to the theatre and are asked to do various jobs that turn out to be fake. They are led into a fake room leading onto the theatre stage, after which either the walls of the fake room fall down or the person opens a door to see the audience. The unexpected star will then go backstage to prepare for their big performance at the end of the show. For children, Michael will play a worker and ask the child to do various jobs that turn out to be fake, before he removes his makeup to reveal himself. The child opens a door to see the audience, before going backstage to prepare for their big performance at the end of the show. In series two episode 5, there were two unexpected stars of the show and in series two episode 6 there were 21 unexpected stars of the show; a choir.
Celebrity Comedian	In most shows, there is a celebrity comedian who does a 5-minute item in the show while McIntyre goes offstage for a break. Standup comedians such as Russell Howard, Sarah Millican, Catherine Tate, Harry Enfield, Romesh Ranganathan, Colin Cloud, Josh Widdicombe and Jack Whitehall have appeared in or are scheduled to appear in this segment.
Midnight Gameshow	From the third series a new segment was introduced called Midnight Gameshow this sees Michael go into one of the audiences' homes at midnight without them knowing and sneaking in to play a gameshow at midnight in the house of the surprised audience member. Michael asks three questions and celebrity guests also make an appearance. In later series, Michael would go into celebrities' houses, rather than members of the public.
Big Audience Surprise	Only found in some of the episodes, Audience Surprise is a part of the show where Michael goes into the audience and will ask people questions until he finds the member of the audience he's looking for to surprise them with something about their lives in some way. In the second episode of the second series, McIntyre got a member of the audience up on the stage to play a game titled "Soap or Nope", where an audience member is shown a conveyor belt with actors and lookalikes travelling along it, for the audience viewer to guess whether they were from a soap or not. At the end of the segment, McIntyre introduced the audience member with her long- term pen pal and best friend from Australia, who she had never seen before: hence the fact that the audience member thought that her pen pal was a soap star, stating that she was "definitely soap". More surprises include “See it Win it” where an audience member's boyfriend ended up proposing to her and in the 2019 Christmas show where there was a family reunion.
Music Performance	In each episode, a guest performer or group will appear on stage with their latest song. In some episodes, the cast of new musicals appear with a number from their show. All Saints, Ellie Goulding, the cast of the musical School of Rock, Years & Years, Tom Odell, Shane Filan, Michael Ball and Jess Glynne are some of the performers to appear on the show.
Christmas Games	In Michael McIntyre's Big Christmas Show there was a new feature of the show where 4 people, some celebrities, some non-celebrities, are playing against each other in festive games. The first game was Tree Decorating, and the second was putting food into a fridge.
Remember Me?	A celebrity guest is presented with a succession of people rising into the middle of the stage through a trap door, the celebrity has to remember who they are. Each person is someone they have previously met; they may be a notable person from their past (e.g. former relationship) or someone they briefly encountered very recently (e.g. florist delivery).

== Series overview ==
Series	Episodes	Originally released		Average UK viewership (in millions)
Series	Episodes	First released	Last released	Average UK viewership (in millions)
Pilot		25 December 2015		—N/a
1	6	16 April 2016	28 May 2016	4.22
2	6	19 November 2016	24 December 2016	6.63
3	6	18 November 2017	24 December 2017	6.97
4	8	17 November 2018	12 January 2019	7.58
5	6	23 November 2019	25 December 2019	7.22
6	6	14 January 2023	18 February 2023	5.36
7	6	13 January 2024	17 February 2024	5.67
8	6	18 January 2025	22 February 2025	TBA
9	6	17 January 2026	28 February 2026	TBA

== Awards and nominations ==
Year	Result	Award	Category
2017	Won	British Academy Television Awards	Best Entertainment Performance
2017	Nominated	British Academy Television Awards	Best Entertainment Programme
2018	Nominated	British Academy Television Awards	Best Entertainment Performance
2018	Nominated	British Academy Television Awards	Best Entertainment Programme
2019	Nominated	British Academy Television Awards	Best Entertainment Programme
2024	Nominated	British Academy Television Awards	Best Entertainment Programme
2024	Nominated	National Television Awards	The Bruce Forsyth Entertainment Award
2025	Nominated	British Academy Television Awards	Best Entertainment Programme
2025	Won	National Television Awards	The Bruce Forsyth Entertainment Award

== International versions ==
Country	Name	Presenter	Channel	Dates
France	Le Big Show de Jarry	Jarry	France 2	14 May 2022 – 2024
Italy	Big Show con Andrea Pucci	Andrea Pucci	Italia 1	27 September 2017 – 18 October 2018
Italy	Big Show - Enrico Papi	Enrico Papi	Canale 5	8 April – 8 May 2022
Netherlands	The Big Show met Ruben Nicolai	Ruben Nicolai	RTL 4	29 October – 17 December 2022
Spain	La noche del Gran Show	Dani Martínez	Telecinco	24 June – 29 July 2025
