= Kings (Australian TV series) =

Kings is a 1983 Australian television series dealing with the working-class King family living in Sydney. Headed by George King (Ed Devereaux), who runs a panel beating shop, the family consists of his wife Rose (Melissa Jaffer), three sons, two daughters and two grandchildren. Each episode contains a self contained story. It was the first drama series produced by PBL Productions. It was scheduled for 26 weeks of hour-long episodes that began on 12 July 1983 on the Nine Network. After a good start in the ratings, its figures quickly fell by the fourth episode. Kings was later moved to the Summer non-ratings period, and a reporter for The Sydney Morning Herald observed that it was likely to "go the same way" as Nine's other short-lived soaps, Taurus Rising and Waterloo Station. Actor Ed Devereaux believed that Nine acted too quickly and should have waited to broadcast the show.

== Cast and characters ==
- Ed Devereaux as George King, a panel beater with "a reckless past".
- Melissa Jaffer as Rose King, wife of George.
- Dennis Grosvenor as Charlie King, eldest son of George and Rose.
- Simon Burke as Brian King, son of George and Rose.
- Scott Burgess as Shane King, youngest son of George and Rose.
- Deborra-Lee Furness as Frances Dalton, daughter of George and Rose.
- Kim Krejus as Donna King, daughter of George and Rose.
- Arna-Maria Winchester as Christine King, wife of Charlie and Alison's mother.
- Arkie Whiteley as Alison King, Christine's 16 year old daughter.
- Mark Kounnas as Brett Dalton, Frances and Mike's 12 year old son
- Peter Ford as Mike Dalton, Frances's husband who is serving a two-year prison sentence.
