= Seeing Is Believing (TV series) =

Australian magazine style television show (1985)

Seeing is Believing is an SBS magazine style television program for children in Australia that began broadcasting in 1985. It was aimed at an audience from 8-14 years old. It initially ran in the Friday 6PM slot and would present three stories each show. It was hosted by siblings Mark, Melissa and Debbie Kounnas (at the time ages 15, 14 and 12 respectively). In December 13-year old reporter Helen Anton was added to the cast for the second series.
