= Melissa Kounnas =

Australian actress

- Occupations: Actor, television presenter
- Known for: Professor Poopsnaggle and His Flying Zeppelin
- Relatives: Mark Kounnas

Melissa Kounnas is an Australian actress and television presenter, best known for her role in the children's television series Professor Poopsnaggle and His Flying Zeppelin as Robyn. She was a host on Seeing Is Believing. She is a television presenter for infomercials such as Guthy Renker on morning television.

Kounnas has appeared in the television series E Street and A Country Practice, and the movie Dating the Enemy.

== Personal life ==
Her brother is actor and television presenter Mark Kounnas.
