= Mark Kounnas =

Australian actor

- Born: Mark Kounnas
- Citizenship: Australia
- Occupations: Actor; Voice over artist
- Known for: Mad Max Beyond Thunderdome

Mark Kounnas (born 1969) is an Australian actor and television presenter. Mark has had many acting roles on television and films and is probably best known for his role in Mad Max Beyond Thunderdome as Gekko. He has also been a television presenter on the ABC children's television series Seeing Is Believing with his sister and fellow actor Melissa Kounnas.

He was the youngest cast member of Catch Us If You Can. He featured in the TV series Butterfly Island Kings and Chances (until October 1991) and appeared as a young Donald Bradman in the mini-series Bodyline. He had small roles in Water Rats, Heartbreak High and A Country Practice. He also appeared in the 1982 Ginger Meggs movie as Raggsy.

== Bibliography ==
- Holmstrom, John. The Moving Picture Boy: An International Encyclopaedia from 1895 to 1995. Norwich, Michael Russell, 1996, p. 376.
