= Dynamo: Magician Impossible =

British television series

- Genre: Documentary
- Directed by: Simon Dinsell; Mark McQueen
- Starring: Steven Frayne
- Country of origin: United Kingdom
- Original language: English
- No. of series: 4
- No. of episodes: 16

Production
- Executive producers: Dan Albion; Lucy Ansbro; Debbie Young; Helen Parker; Angela Robertson
- Producers: Randeep Sandhu; Luti Fagbenle
- Production locations: London; Bradford
- Running time: 45 minutes (approx.)
- Production companies: Phil McIntyre Television; Inner Circle Films

Original release
- Network: Watch
- Release: 7 July 2011 – 25 September 2014

Related
- Tricked; Troy

Dynamo: Magician Impossible is a fly on the wall documentary series following the life of English magician Steven Frayne, better known as Dynamo. The show is produced by Phil McIntyre Productions and Inner Circle Films for UKTV's channel Watch and Universal Networks International. In 2012, the show was nominated for Best Entertainment Programme at the 17th National Television Awards.

Four series of Dynamo: Magician Impossible were commissioned and broadcast on Watch between 2011 and 2014. The series reached over 30 million viewers in the UK and over 250 million viewers worldwide across 193 territories. After being broadcast on Watch, it was confirmed on 19 December 2013 that three episodes from the show's first series would air on BBC One the following year. Repeats are now regularly broadcast on UKTV's channel Dave.

== Background ==
In 2003, before Frayne created and filmed Dynamo: Magician Impossible, the Prince's Trust gave him a loan which allowed him to start his business and invest in camera equipment. Frayne left his hometown of Bradford, Yorkshire, to move to London in 2004 to begin developing his career in magic. His plan was to create the first ever 'magic mix-tape', where he set out with a small team to film his performances on the streets of London and backstage at events. In a year, Frayne had performed magic to talent including Coldplay, Gwyneth Paltrow, Snoop Dogg and more, and quickly developed a fan-base after posting the clips on YouTube.

Frayne first appeared on TV as Dynamo on Channel 4’s Richard & Judy, where the general public and television executives quickly noticed his kind-hearted and loveable attitude.

== Series overview ==
=== Series 1 ===
The four-episode first series aired from 7 July 2011 until 28 July 2011. To launch the show, Frayne walked on water across the River Thames outside the Houses of Parliament, in front of a crowd who had gathered on Westminster Bridge. The first series was filmed in London, Miami and Los Angeles, and racked up 6.69 million viewers in the UK, leading to UKTV renewing the show for a second and third series in February 2012.

No.	Location(s)	Date	Viewers (millions)	Watch weekly rank
1	London	7 July 2011	1.35	1
2	London	14 July 2011	1.73	1
3	Miami	21 July 2011	1.79	1
4	Los Angeles, London	28 July 2011	1.82	1

=== Series 2 ===
Series 2 of Dynamo: Magician Impossible premiered on 5 July 2012, and was again four-episodes in duration. Episode 2 of this series saw Dynamo visit Rio de Janeiro, where he appeared to levitate in front of the Christ the Redeemer statue.

The series generated 7.67 million viewers in the UK and won the award for Best Entertainment Programme at the Broadcast Awards, show of the year at the Virgin Media awards and was shortlisted for Best Entertainment Programme at the 17th National Television Awards. This series also received a BAFTA nomination for Best Entertainment Programme.

No.	Location(s)	Date	Viewers (millions)	Watch weekly rank
1	London, Bradford	5 July 2012	2.10	1
2	Rio de Janeiro	12 July 2012	2.05	1
3	Arizona, Las Vegas, Los Angeles	19 July 2012	1.95	1
4	London	26 July 2012	1.57	1

=== Series 3 ===
In 2013, Frayne travelled to New York City, Ibiza, South Africa and London to film content for the show's third series. The first episode, filmed in New York City, was broadcast on 11 July 2013 and was viewed by 1.35 million people. The series was again nominated for BAFTA's Best Entertainment Programme award, alongside Ant & Dec's Saturday Night Takeaway, Derren Brown: The Great Art Robbery and Strictly Come Dancing.

No.	Location(s)	Date	Viewers (millions)	Watch weekly rank
1	New York City	11 July 2013	1.35	1
2	Ibiza	18 July 2013	1.01	1
3	South Africa	25 July 2013	1.25	1
4	London, Sheffield	1 August 2013	0.70	1

=== Series 4 ===
A fourth and final series of the show was commissioned by UKTV in 2014, which aired in the September of the same year. In this series, Dynamo performed street magic in California, India, Paris, London, Manchester and Bradford. For the third year running, Dynamo: Magician Impossible was nominated by BAFTA for the Best Entertainment Programme award.

No.	Location(s)	Date	Viewers (millions)	Watch weekly rank
1	California	4 September 2014	0.80	1
2	India	11 September 2014	0.50	2
3	Paris, London	18 September 2014	0.48	3
4	Manchester, London, Bradford	25 September 2014	0.49	1

== International syndications ==
Country	Network
United Kingdom	Watch
United Kingdom	BBC One
United Kingdom	Dave
Ireland	Watch
Ireland	Dave
Australia	Seven
Australia	7mate
Canada	Casa
New Zealand	TV1
United States	BBC America
United States	Discovery Channel
United States	TLC
India	History TV18
Spain	Discovery Channel
South Africa	Discovery Channel
Poland	Discovery Channel
Italy	Discovery Channel
The Netherlands	Discovery Channel
Denmark	Discovery Channel
Bulgaria	Discovery Channel
Romania	Discovery Channel
Russia	Discovery Channel
