= Michael McIntyre =

English comedian (born 1976)

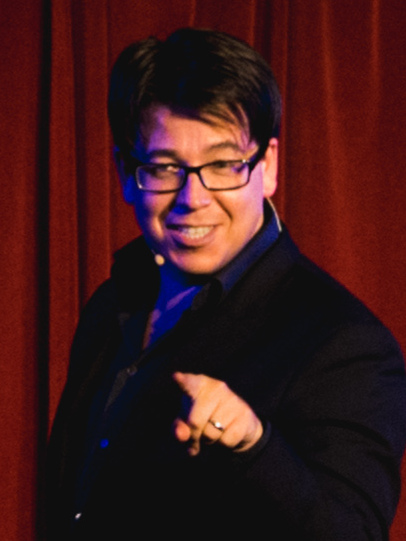
- McIntyre in 2017
- Born: Michael Hazen James McIntyre; 21 February 1976 (age 50); London, England
- Education: Merchant Taylors' School
- Spouse: Kitty Ward (m. 2003)
- Children: 2

Comedy career
- Years active: 1999–present
- Medium: Stand-up; television
- Genres: Social satire; observational comedy; physical comedy
- Subjects: Everyday life; marriage; family; British culture; British politics; sex
- Michael McIntyre's voice From the BBC programme Desert Island Discs, 17 July 2011.
- Website: michaelmcintyre.co.uk

Signature
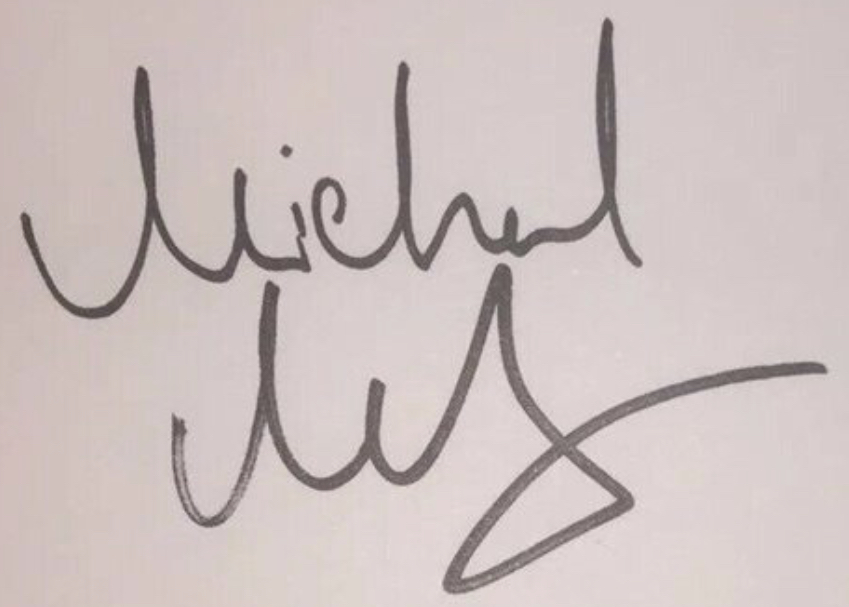

Michael Hazen James McIntyre (born 21 February 1976) is a British comedian, writer, and television presenter. In 2012, he was the highest-grossing stand-up comedian in the world. He presents the variety and stand-up comedy show Michael McIntyre's Big Show and the game show The Wheel.

McIntyre has fronted his own comedy show Michael McIntyre's Comedy Roadshow (2009–2011), featured in three episodes of the stand-up comedy show Live at the Apollo (2007–2009), and judged on the fifth series of the talent competition Britain's Got Talent (2011). McIntyre has performed three times on the Royal Variety Performance, including in 2010 when he became the youngest-ever host.

McIntyre has written and performed five stand-up comedy tours: Live & Laughing (2008–2009), Showtime (2012), Happy and Glorious (2015), Michael McIntyre's Big World Tour (2018–2020), and Macnificent (2023–2025).

== Early life ==
Michael Hazen James McIntyre was born on 21 February 1976 in London to Thomas Cameron McIntyre, professionally known as Ray Cameron, a Canadian comedian and comedy writer in British television, and his wife Kati. McIntyre grew up in a family closely associated with the entertainment industry and has a sister, Lucy. He holds dual British-Canadian citizenship, by virtue of his father.

In 1993, McIntyre was told that his father died of a heart attack, but in 2010, his stepmother Holly revealed that Cameron had died by suicide. His mother, Kati, is of Hungarian Jewish ancestry on her father’s side.

He was privately educated at both Arnold House School and Merchant Taylors' School, Northwood.

== Career ==
=== Television ===
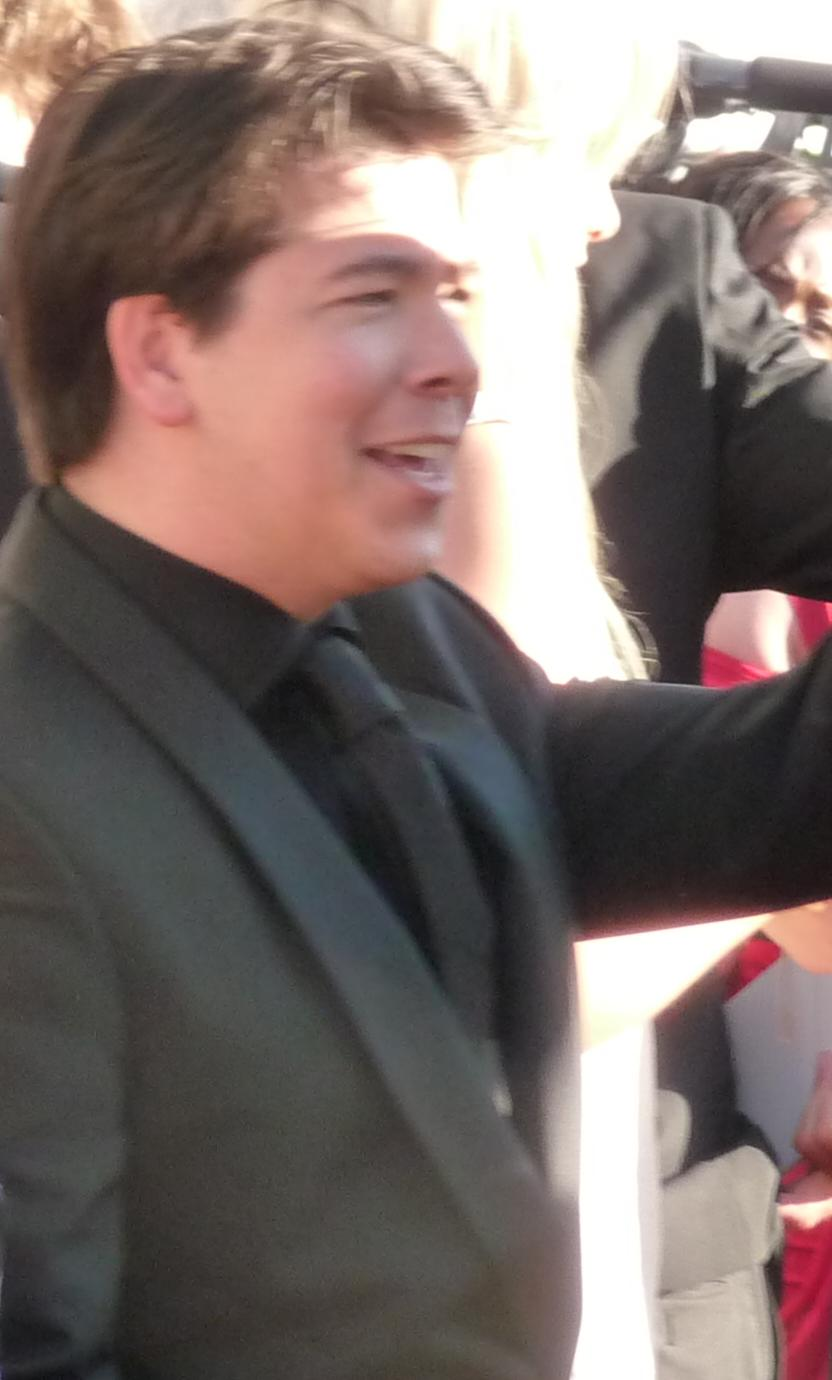
McIntyre at the British Academy Television Awards 2009

McIntyre has appeared three times on BBC One's Live at the Apollo, in 2007, 2008 and 2009. He has released four DVDs, Live and Laughing, Hello Wembley, Showtime and Happy and Glorious, which have sold a combined total of over five million copies in the UK.

McIntyre's many comedy panel show and chat show appearances include Chris Moyles' Quiz Night, Mock the Week, 8 out of 10 Cats, Have I Got News for You, The Big Fat Quiz of the Year, Would I Lie To You?, The Apprentice: You're Fired!, Alan Carr: Chatty Man and Friday Night with Jonathan Ross.

From 6 June 2009, McIntyre began hosting Michael McIntyre's Comedy Roadshow, which aired Saturday nights on BBC One. On 5 July 2009, McIntyre appeared on the BBC show Top Gear as the "star in a reasonably priced car", driving around the Top Gear test track in one minute and 48.7 seconds. During his lap of the track he almost rolled the car while going around the final corner.

On 31 March 2010, McIntyre took part in Channel 4's Comedy Gala, a benefit show held in aid of Great Ormond Street Hospital, filmed live at London's O2 Arena. He also appeared on the year's edition of The Big Fat Quiz of the Year on Channel 4, where he was partnered with Alan Carr.

On 14 December 2010, it was announced that McIntyre would join the ITV talent show Britain's Got Talent as a judge in 2011 with David Hasselhoff and Amanda Holden. McIntyre and Hasselhoff replaced Piers Morgan and Simon Cowell, although Cowell returned for the live shows and Hasselhoff was only the additional fourth judge. After only one series, McIntyre was replaced by Alesha Dixon.

In 2010 and 2014, McIntyre hosted the Royal Variety Performance on ITV. He also previously performed on the show twice: in 2006 and 2008.

McIntyre co-hosted various segments of Comic Relief in 2011 and 2013 on BBC One. On Christmas Day 2011, he hosted a Christmas Special edition of Michael McIntyre's Comedy Roadshow. The show was watched by 8.1 million viewers.

In 2014 McIntyre fronted his own BBC One talk programme, The Michael McIntyre Chat Show. A Christmas special aired on Christmas Day in 2014. On 5 April 2015, he presented Michael McIntyre Presents...Easter Night at the Coliseum, a one-off special for BBC One.

In November 2015, it was announced that McIntyre would return to BBC One for Michael McIntyre's Big Christmas Show. The show was recorded in front of a live audience in the Theatre Royal in London before airing on Christmas Day.

Since April 2016, McIntyre has presented Michael McIntyre's Big Show, a Saturday night entertainment series for BBC One. A second series began airing in November 2016. A third series began airing in November 2017.

In November 2020, McIntyre began hosting a new BBC gameshow entitled The Wheel. In August 2021, it was announced that McIntyre would host a U.S. version of The Wheel on NBC, which premiered on 19 December 2022.

=== Stage ===
Michael started his stand-up career in 1999. Shappi Khorsandi shared an Edinburgh Festival venue with him, in August 2003, and told how one night he performed to an audience of one.

McIntyre has performed three times on the Royal Variety Performance, including in 2010 when he became the youngest-ever host. In 2009, he performed for an estimated total of 500,000 people on his first tour of the United Kingdom that included a record-breaking six nights at Wembley Arena and four at The O2 Arena.

In 2012, McIntyre's UK tour included 71 arena dates, playing to over 700,000 people, including a record-breaking 10 nights at the O2 Arena in London. According to ticket sales company Pollstar, the tour helped make him the world's biggest selling comedian in 2012, bringing in around £21m. On 20 April 2013 he played the biggest comedy gig in Africa to 9,000 fans at the Coca-Cola Dome in Johannesburg.

In 2015, McIntyre toured the UK and Ireland with his "Happy & Glorious" tour. In February 2016, he and the tour went to Norway for two dates, and in October 2016 he took it to Australia for four dates. In 2018 he became the highest selling artist in the history of the O2 Arena, selling over 400,000 tickets over 28 shows, which surpassed the previous record held by Take That.

In 2023, McIntyre announced his 2023–2025 tour ‘Macnificent’. The tour included dates in the UK, Europe, North America, South Africa, and The United Arab Emirates.

=== Radio ===
McIntyre's radio appearances have included:

- Does the Team Think? (BBC Radio 2)
- Heresy, 4 Stands Up, Happy Mondays, The Unbelievable Truth (all on BBC Radio 4)
- The Jon Richardson Show (BBC 6 Music)
- The Jonathan Ross Show (BBC Radio 2)
- The Chris Moyles Show (BBC Radio 1)
- Desert Island Discs (BBC Radio 4)

=== Books ===
In 2010, McIntyre released his autobiography, Life and Laughing: My Story.

In 2021, he released the second part of his memoirs, A Funny Life, detailing his life after his debut at the 2006 Royal Variety Performance (his previous book concluded with the event).

== Personal life ==
As of 2023, McIntyre lives in Hampstead, London, with his aromatherapist wife, Kitty, who is a daughter of actor Simon Ward and sister of actress Sophie Ward. The couple have two sons.

McIntyre is a supporter of Tottenham Hotspur. He is also a cricket fan and has appeared on Test Match Special to discuss the sport.

== Stand-up ==
=== Tours ===
Year	Title	Notes
2008–09	Live & Laughing	
2012	Showtime	
2015	Happy and Glorious	
2018–20	Michael McIntyre's Big World Tour	
2023–25	Macnificent	

=== DVD releases ===
Title	Released	Notes
Live & Laughing	17 November 2008	Live at London's Hammersmith Apollo
Hello Wembley!	16 November 2009	Live at London's Wembley Arena
Showtime!	12 November 2012	Live at London's O2 Arena
Happy & Glorious - Live at the O2 Arena	16 November 2015	Live at London's O2 Arena
Showman	12 September 2020	Netflix special Live at London's Palladium

== Filmography ==
Year	Title	Role	Notes
2007	Michael McIntyre: Live at the Comedy Store	Comic	One-off entertainment show
2007–2009	Live at the Apollo	Comic	3 episodes
2009	Top Gear	Self as Star in the Reasonably Priced Car	1 episode; Season 13, Ep. 3
2009–2011	Michael McIntyre's Comedy Roadshow	Presenter	2 series
2010, 2014	Royal Variety Performance	Presenter	On two occasions
2011	Britain's Got Talent	Judge	Series 5
2011–2013	Comic Relief	Presenter	Main telethons
2014	The Michael McIntyre Chat Show	Presenter	1 series
2015	Michael McIntyre Presents... Easter Night at the Coliseum	Presenter	One-off entertainment show
2015–present	Michael McIntyre's Big Show	Presenter	9 series + 4 Christmas specials
2020–present	The Wheel	Presenter	7 series
2021	Michael McIntyre: In His Own Words	Himself	Documentary
2022	The Wheel	Presenter	American adaptation; 10 episodes

== Awards ==
Year	Category	Award	Result
2003	Perrier Award	Best Newcomer	Nominated
2007	Chortle Awards	Best Headliner	Nominated
2008	Chortle Awards	Best Headliner	Won
2008	British Comedy Awards	Best Live Stand-up	Nominated
2009	British Comedy Awards	Best Comedy Entertainment Personality	Nominated
2009	British Comedy Awards	Best Stand-Up	Won
2009	GQ Award	Best Comedian	Won
2010	National Television Awards	Best Entertainment Presenter	Nominated
2010	Chortle Awards	Best Tour	Won
2010	RTS Awards	Best Entertainment Presenter	Nominated
2010	BAFTA Awards	Entertainment Performance	Nominated
2010	British Comedy Awards	Best Male TV Comic	Won
2012	National Television Awards	Best Entertainment Show (Michael McIntyre's Comedy Roadshow)	Won
2012	BAFTA Awards	Best Entertainment Programme (Michael McIntyre's Christmas Comedy Roadshow)	Nominated
2014	National Television Awards	Best Chat Show Host (The Michael McIntyre Chat Show)	Nominated
2016	Billboard Touring Awards	Top Comedy Tour	Nominated
2017	BAFTA Awards	Best Entertainment Performance (Michael McIntyre's Big Show)	Won
2017	BAFTA Awards	Best Entertainment Show (Michael McIntyre's Big Show)	Nominated
2018	BAFTA Awards	Best Entertainment Performance (Michael McIntyre's Big Show)	Nominated
2018	BAFTA Awards	Best Entertainment Show (Michael McIntyre's Big Show)	Nominated
2019	RTS Awards	Best Entertainment Presenter (Michael McIntyre's Big Show)	Nominated
2019	BAFTA Awards	Best Entertainment Programme (Michael McIntyre's Big Show)	Nominated
2022	BAFTA Awards	Entertainment Performance (Michael McIntyre's The Wheel)	Nominated
2024	RTS Awards	Best Entertainment Programme (Michael McIntyre's The Wheel)	Nominated
2024	BAFTA Awards	Best Entertainment Programme (Michael McIntyre's Big Show)	Nominated
2025	BAFTA Awards	Best Entertainment Programme (Michael McIntyre's Big Show)	Nominated
2025	National Television Awards	Entertainment Award (Michael McIntyre's Big Show)	Won
