= Jack Savoretti discography =

- Studio albums: 9
- Extended plays: 2
- Compilation albums: 1
- Singles: 46
- B-sides: 8
- Music videos: 10

English singer-songwriter Jack Savoretti has released nine studio albums, one compilation album, two extended plays (EPs) and 46 singles, including two as a featured artist.

== Albums ==
=== Studio albums ===
Title	Details	Peak chart positions						Certifications
Title	Details	UK	AUS	GER	IRE	ITA	SWI	Certifications
Between the Minds	Released: 5 March 2007; Label: De Angelis Records; Formats: CD, digital download	70	—	—	—	—	—	
Harder Than Easy	Released: 15 September 2009; Label: De Angelis Records; Formats: CD, digital download	—	—	—	—	—	—	
Before the Storm	Released: 4 June 2012; Label: Fullfill Records; Formats: CD, LP, digital download	109	—	—	—	—	—	
Written in Scars	Released: 9 February 2015; Label: BMG Chrysalis UK; Formats: CD, LP, digital download	7	47	—	17	67	11	BPI: Gold
Sleep No More	Released: 28 October 2016; Label: BMG Chrysalis UK; Formats: CD, LP, digital download	6	58	—	89	15	23	BPI: Gold
Singing to Strangers	Released: 15 March 2019; Label: BMG; Formats: CD, LP, digital download	1	23	98	47	19	8	BPI: Gold
Europiana	Released: 25 June 2021; Label: EMI; Formats: CD, LP, digital download	1	—	—	—	46	15	BPI: Silver
Miss Italia	Released: 17 May 2024; Label: Lanza Music; Formats: CD, LP, digital download	43	—	—	—	23	98	
We Will Always Be the Way We Were	Released: 10 April 2026; Label: Lanza Music; Formats: CD, LP, digital download	2	—	—	—	—	73	
"—" denotes a recording that did not chart or was not released in that territory.

=== Compilation albums ===
Title	Details
Songs from Different Times	Released: 3 November 2017; Label: De Angelis Records; Formats: CD, digital download

== Extended plays ==
Title	Details
Sweet Hurt	Released: 27 January 2014; Formats: CD, digital download
Tie Me Down	Released: 20 October 2014; Formats: CD, digital download
Under Cover	Released: 18 December 2020; Formats: Digital download, streaming

== Singles ==
=== As lead artist ===
Title	Year	Peak chart positions		Album
Title	Year	UK	UK Digital	Album
"Without"	2006	90	—	Between the Minds
"Dreamers"	2007	123	—	Between the Minds
"Between the Minds"	2007	—	—	Between the Minds
"Dr Frankenstein"	2007	—	—	Between the Minds
"Gypsy Love" / "One Man Band"	2008	—	—	Between the Minds
"Map of the World"	2009	—	—	Harder Than Easy
"One Day"	2009	—	—	Non-album singles
"Hate & Love"	2012	—	—	Non-album singles
"Knock Knock"	2012	—	—	Before the Storm
"Take Me Home"	2012	—	—	Before the Storm
"Breaking the Rules"	2012	—	—	Before the Storm
"Changes"	2012	—	—	Before the Storm
"Not Worthy"	2013	—	—	Before the Storm
"Lifetime"	2013	—	—	Before the Storm
"Written in Scars" (live)	2013	—	—	Non-album single
"Sweet Hurt"	2014	193	—	Sweet Hurt EP
"Tie Me Down"	2014	—	—	Tie Me Down EP
"Back to Me"	2015	—	—	Written in Scars
"Home"	2015	—	98	Written in Scars
"The Other Side of Love"	2015	—	—	Written in Scars
"Written in Scars"	2015	—	85	Written in Scars
"Back Where I Belong"	2015	—	68	Written in Scars (New Edition)
"Catapult"	2015	89	—	Written in Scars (New Edition)
"When We Were Lovers"	2016	—	55	Sleep No More
"We Are Bound"	2017	—	—	Sleep No More
"Soldiers" (live)	2017	—	—	Sleep No More (Special Edition)
"Whiskey Tango"	2017	—	64	Sleep No More (Special Edition)
"Music's Too Sad Without You" (with Kylie Minogue)	2018	—	17	Golden
"Candlelight"	2019	70	—	Singing to Strangers
"Youth and Love"	2019	—	—	Singing to Strangers
"What More Can I Do?"	2019	—	21	Singing to Strangers
"Love Is on the Line"	2019	—	—	Singing to Strangers
"Greatest Mistake" (edit)	2019	—	33	Singing to Strangers
"You and Me as One" (with Sigma)	2019	—	—	Hope
"Andra Tutto Bene"	2020	—	70	Non-album single
"Secret Life"	2021	—	—	Europiana
"Who's Hurting Who"	2021	—	—	Europiana
"You Don't Have to Say You Love Me" ("Io che non vivo senza te")	2022	—	27	Europiana Encore
"Dancing Through the Rain"	2022	—	73	Europiana Encore
"What the World Needs Now Is Love" (with Katherine Jenkins)	2023	—	—	Non-album single
"Come Posso Raccontare"	2024	—	—	Miss Italia
"Senza una Donna" (with Zucchero)	2024	—	43	Miss Italia
"Ultime Parole" (with Natalie Imbruglia)	2024	—	—	Miss Italia
"Do It for Love"	2025	—	—	
"Only Gonna Cry for You"	2025	—	—	
"We Will Always Be The Way We Were"	2026	—	8	We Will Always Be The Way We Were
"I Hear You	2026	—	—	
"Tempting Fate" (with KT Tunstall)	2026	—	—	

=== As featured artist ===
Title	Year	Peak chart positions	Album
Title	Year	UK	Album
"Stop Crying Your Heart Out" (as Radio 2 Allstars for BBC Children in Need)	2020	7	Non-album singles
"Hold Your Head Up" (with Albin Lee Meldau)	2023	—	Non-album singles

== Other charted songs ==
Title	Year	Peak chart positions	Album
Title	Year	UK Digital	Album
"Soldiers Eyes"	2024	87	Between the Minds

== Guest appearances ==
List of non-single guest appearances, showing other artist(s), year released and album name
Title	Year	Artist(s)	Album
"Any Day Now"	2014	Red Sky July	Shadowbirds
"Waste Your Time on Me"	2017	Elisa	On
"Ready to Call This Love"	2019	Mika	My Name Is Michael Holbrook

== B-sides ==
Title	A-side
"Lay You Down"	"Without"
"Weightless"	"Without"
"Apologies"	"Without"
"One"	"Dreamers"
"Sacred Land"	"Dreamers"
"Mourning After"	"Dreamers"
"Lucy"	"Map of the World"
"Crazy Town"	"Take Me Home"

== Music videos ==
Title	Year
"Without"	2006
"Dreamers"	2007
"Between the Minds"	2007
"Dr Frankenstein"	2007
"One Man Band"	2008
"One Day"	2009
"Take Me Home"	2012
"Breaking the Rules"	2012
"Changes"	2012
"Not Worthy"	2012
"Tie Me Down"	2014
"Home"	2014
"The Other Side of Love"	2015
"Written in Scars"	2015
"Back Where I Belong"	2015
"Catapult"	2016
"When We Were Lovers"	2016
"I'm Yours"	2016
"Candlelight"	2019
