= List of UK top-ten albums in 2016 =

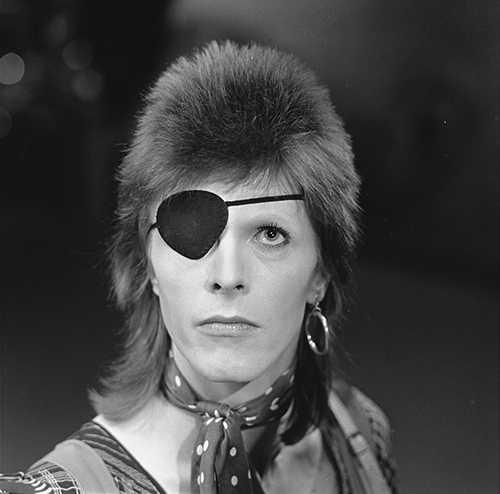
Following his death on 10th January 2016, David Bowie (pictured in 1974) debuted at number-one with his final studio album Blackstar, which ended up as the sixth best selling album of the year. Meanwhile, four other Bowie albums entered/re-entered the top 10, including the compilation album Best of Bowie, originally released in 2002, which peaked at number-one in February. Bowie ended up having the most top 10 albums this year, with six in total.

The UK Albums Chart is one of many music charts compiled by the Official Charts Company that calculates the best-selling albums of the week in the United Kingdom. Since 2004 the chart has been based on the sales of both physical albums and digital downloads. This list shows albums that peaked in the Top 10 of the UK Albums Chart during 2016, as well as albums which peaked in 2015 but were in the top 10 in 2016. The entry date is when the album appeared in the top 10 for the first time (week ending, as published by the Official Charts Company, which is six days after the chart is announced).

One-hundred and sixty-seven albums were in the top 10 this year. Two albums from 2014 and eight albums from 2015 remained in the top 10 for several weeks at the beginning of the year. A Head Full of Dreams by Coldplay was the only album from 2015 to reach its peak in 2016. Giggs and Jack Garratt were among the many artists who achieved their first UK charting top 10 album in 2016.

The 2015 Christmas number-one album, 25 by Adele, remained at number one for the first two weeks of 2016. The first new number-one album of the year was Blackstar by David Bowie. Overall, thirty-five different albums peaked at number-one in 2016, with David Bowie (2) having the most albums hit that position.

== Background ==
=== Chart debuts ===
The following table (collapsed on desktop site) does not include acts who had previously charted as part of a group and secured their first top 10 solo album, or featured appearances on compilations or other artists recordings.

Artist	Number of top 10s	First entry	Chart position	Other entries
Jack Savoretti	2	Written in Scars	7	Sleep No More (6)
Charlie Puth	1	Nine Track Mind	6	—
Jack Garratt	1	Phase	3	—
Kano	1	Made in the Manor	8	—
Killswitch Engage	1	Incarnate	10	—
Lukas Graham	1	Lukas Graham	2	—
Skepta	1	Konnichiwa	2	—
Kygo	1	Cloud Nine	3	—
Fifth Harmony	1	7/27	6	—
Christine and the Queens	1	Chaleur humaine	2	—
Bear's Den	1	Red Earth & Pouring Rain	6	—
Viola Beach	1	Viola Beach	1	—
DJ Khaled	1	Major Key	7	—
Blossoms	1	Blossoms	1	—
Giggs	1	Landlord	2	—
Moose Blood	1	Blush	10	—
Twenty One Pilots	1	Blurryface	5	—
Ward Thomas	1	Cartwheels	1	—
A Day to Remember	1	Bad Vibrations	6	—
Shawn Mendes	1	Illuminate	3	—
Airbourne	1	Breakin' Outta Hell	9	—
Blackberry Smoke	1	Like an Arrow	8	—
Bradley Walsh	1	Chasing Dreams	10	—

=== Soundtracks ===
The only film soundtrack album to enter the top 10 this year was Purple Rain by Prince and The Revolution. The album had previously charted in the top 10 upon its initial release in 1984 and peaked at number 7. Upon its 2016 re-entry, following Prince's death, the album reached a brand new peak of number 4.

=== Best-selling albums ===
For the second year in a row, Adele had the best-selling album of the year with 25. A Head Full of Dreams by Coldplay came in second place. Michael Ball & Alfie Boe's Together, Purpose from Justin Bieber and The Wonder of You by Elvis Presley with the Royal Philharmonic Orchestra made up the top five. Albums by David Bowie, Little Mix, Drake, Jess Glynne and David Bowie (Best of Bowie) were also in the top ten best-selling albums of the year.

== Top-ten albums ==
Key

Symbol	Meaning
‡	Album peaked in 2014 or 2015 but still in chart in 2016.
(#)	Year-end top-ten album position and rank
Entered	The date that the album first appeared in the chart.
Peak	Highest position that the album reached in the UK Albums Chart.

Entered (week ending)	Weeks in top 10	Album	Artist	Peak	Peak reached (week ending)	Weeks at peak
Albums in 2014
5 July 2014	77	× ‡	Ed Sheeran	1	5 July 2014	13
8 November 2014	43	1989 ‡	Taylor Swift	1	8 November 2014	1
Albums in 2015
4 April 2015	32	Chaos and the Calm ‡	James Bay	1	4 April 2015	1
3 September 2015	42	I Cry When I Laugh ‡ (#9)	Jess Glynne	1	3 September 2015	1
12 November 2015	13	If I Can Dream ‡	Elvis Presley with the Royal Philharmonic Orchestra	1	12 November 2015	2
19 November 2015	20	Get Weird ‡	Little Mix	2	19 November 2015	1
26 November 2015	9	Made in the A.M. ‡	One Direction	1	26 November 2015	1
26 November 2015	33	Purpose ‡ (#4)	Justin Bieber	2	26 November 2015	2
3 December 2015	43	25 ‡ (#1)	Adele	1	3 December 2015	13
17 December 2015	30	A Head Full of Dreams (#2)	Coldplay	1	18 February 2016	1
Albums in 2016
21 January 2016	6	Blackstar (#6)	David Bowie	1	21 January 2016	3
21 January 2016	5	Nothing Has Changed: The Very Best of David Bowie	David Bowie	5	21 January 2016	2
28 January 2016	11	Best of Bowie (#10)	David Bowie	1	11 February 2016	1
28 January 2016	1	Death of a Bachelor	Panic! at the Disco	4	28 January 2016	1
28 January 2016	1	Written in Scars	Jack Savoretti	7	28 January 2016	1
4 February 2016	1	Night Thoughts	Suede	6	4 February 2016	1
4 February 2016	1	Hunky Dory	David Bowie	9	4 February 2016	1
4 February 2016	1	The Rise and Fall of Ziggy Stardust and the Spiders from Mars	David Bowie	10	4 February 2016	1
11 February 2016	9	This Is Acting	Sia	3	11 February 2016	1
11 February 2016	2	Nine Track Mind	Charlie Puth	6	11 February 2016	1
11 February 2016	5	Anti	Rihanna	7	11 February 2016	2
18 February 2016	1	Wonderful Crazy Night	Elton John	6	18 February 2016	1
25 February 2016	1	Time of My Life	Ronan Keating	4	25 February 2016	1
3 March 2016	1	Phase	Jack Garratt	3	3 March 2016	1
10 March 2016	4	I Like It When You Sleep, for You Are So Beautiful yet So Unaware of It	The 1975	1	10 March 2016	1
10 March 2016	1	Believe – Songs of Inspiration	Richard & Adam	9	10 March 2016	1
17 March 2016	1	Untitled Unmastered	Kendrick Lamar	7	17 March 2016	1
17 March 2016	1	Made in the Manor	Kano	8	17 March 2016	1
24 March 2016	1	Incarnate	Killswitch Engage	10	24 March 2016	1
31 March 2016	1	Girl at the End of the World	James	2	31 March 2016	1
31 March 2016	1	Post Pop Depression	Iggy Pop	5	31 March 2016	1
31 March 2016	1	Barbara Barbara, We Face a Shining Future	Underworld	10	31 March 2016	1
7 April 2016	2	Mind of Mine	Zayn	1	7 April 2016	1
7 April 2016	1	Blues of Desperation	Joe Bonamassa	3	7 April 2016	1
7 April 2016	1	Beautiful Lies	Birdy	4	7 April 2016	1
14 April 2016	2	Everything You've Come to Expect	The Last Shadow Puppets	1	14 April 2016	1
14 April 2016	3	Lukas Graham	Lukas Graham	2	14 April 2016	1
14 April 2016	1	Super	Pet Shop Boys	3	14 April 2016	1
14 April 2016	1	Kentucky	Black Stone Cherry	5	14 April 2016	1
14 April 2016	4	One Voice	Aled Jones	3	28 April 2016	1
21 April 2016	1	Cleopatra	The Lumineers	1	21 April 2016	1
21 April 2016	1	Red Flag	All Saints	3	21 April 2016	1
21 April 2016	1	Gore	Deftones	5	21 April 2016	1
28 April 2016	1	The Hope Six Demolition Project	PJ Harvey	1	28 April 2016	1
28 April 2016	1	Santana IV	Santana	4	28 April 2016	1
28 April 2016	2	Ultimate Prince	Prince	3	5 May 2016	1
5 May 2016	13	Lemonade	Beyoncé	1	5 May 2016	1
5 May 2016	5	The Very Best of Prince	Prince	2	5 May 2016	1
5 May 2016	1	Purple Rain	Prince and The Revolution	4	5 May 2016	1
5 May 2016	1	Celebration	Katherine Jenkins	7	5 May 2016	1
12 May 2016	16	Views (#8)	Drake	1	12 May 2016	2
12 May 2016	3	Here You Are: The Best of Billy Ocean	Billy Ocean	4	12 May 2016	1
12 May 2016	1	Everything at Once	Travis	5	12 May 2016	1
19 May 2016	5	A Moon Shaped Pool	Radiohead	1	19 May 2016	2
19 May 2016	2	Konnichiwa	Skepta	2	19 May 2016	1
19 May 2016	2	Take Me to the Alley	Gregory Porter	5	19 May 2016	1
19 May 2016	1	Electronica 2: The Heart of Noise	Jean Michel Jarre	8	19 May 2016	1
26 May 2016	1	Cloud Nine	Kygo	3	26 May 2016	1
26 May 2016	1	Thank You	Meghan Trainor	5	26 May 2016	1
2 June 2016	2	Dangerous Woman	Ariana Grande	1	2 June 2016	1
2 June 2016	1	These People	Richard Ashcroft	3	2 June 2016	1
2 June 2016	1	Fallen Angels	Bob Dylan	5	2 June 2016	1
2 June 2016	1	I Still Do	Eric Clapton	6	2 June 2016	1
9 June 2016	3	The Ride	Catfish and the Bottlemen	1	9 June 2016	1
9 June 2016	1	The Lexicon of Love II	ABC	5	9 June 2016	1
9 June 2016	1	7/27	Fifth Harmony	6	9 June 2016	1
16 June 2016	2	Stranger to Stranger	Paul Simon	1	16 June 2016	1
16 June 2016	1	Facing Time	Bugzy Malone	6	16 June 2016	1
16 June 2016	1	Let the Record Show: Dexys Do Irish and Country Soul	Dexys	10	16 June 2016	1
23 June 2016	9	50	Rick Astley	1	23 June 2016	1
23 June 2016	1	Wrong Crowd	Tom Odell	2	23 June 2016	1
23 June 2016	1	Pure McCartney	Paul McCartney	3	23 June 2016	1
23 June 2016	11	All Over the World: The Very Best of Electric Light Orchestra	Electric Light Orchestra	1	4 August 2016	1
23 June 2016	1	Soulsville	Beverley Knight	9	23 June 2016	1
30 June 2016	3	The Getaway	Red Hot Chili Peppers	2	30 June 2016	1
30 June 2016	1	On My One	Jake Bugg	4	30 June 2016	1
30 June 2016	1	Johannesburg (EP)	Mumford & Sons with Baaba Maal	6	30 June 2016	1
30 June 2016	11	Chaleur humaine	Christine and the Queens	2	4 August 2016	1
7 July 2016	1	21	Adele	10	7 July 2016	1
14 July 2016	2	California	Blink-182	1	14 July 2016	1
14 July 2016	1	The Bride	Bat for Lashes	9	14 July 2016	1
21 July 2016	4	Ellipsis	Biffy Clyro	1	21 July 2016	1
21 July 2016	1	Wildflower	The Avalanches	10	21 July 2016	1
28 July 2016	4	Love & Hate	Michael Kiwanuka	1	28 July 2016	1
28 July 2016	9	Legend	Bob Marley and the Wailers	5	25 August 2016	2
4 August 2016	1	Red Earth & Pouring Rain	Bear's Den	6	4 August 2016	1
11 August 2016	2	Viola Beach	Viola Beach	1	11 August 2016	1
11 August 2016	1	Major Key	DJ Khaled	7	11 August 2016	1
18 August 2016	2	Blossoms	Blossoms	1	18 August 2016	2
18 August 2016	1	Landlord	Giggs	2	18 August 2016	1
18 August 2016	1	Boy King	Wild Beasts	9	18 August 2016	1
18 August 2016	1	Blush	Moose Blood	10	18 August 2016	1
25 August 2016	5	Blurryface	Twenty One Pilots	5	8 September 2016	1
1 September 2016	2	Blonde	Frank Ocean	1	1 September 2016	1
1 September 2016	2	Pure & Simple	Dolly Parton	2	1 September 2016	1
1 September 2016	1	Life on the Road	David Brent & Foregone Conclusion	3	1 September 2016	1
8 September 2016	2	Encore: Movie Partners Sing Broadway	Barbra Streisand	1	8 September 2016	1
8 September 2016	1	Glory	Britney Spears	2	8 September 2016	1
15 September 2016	3	Cartwheels	Ward Thomas	1	15 September 2016	1
15 September 2016	2	The Nation's Favourite Carpenters Songs	The Carpenters	2	15 September 2016	1
15 September 2016	1	Trick	Jamie T	3	15 September 2016	1
15 September 2016	1	Growing Over Life	Wretch 32	5	15 September 2016	1
15 September 2016	1	Bad Vibrations	A Day to Remember	6	15 September 2016	1
15 September 2016	1	Foreverland	The Divine Comedy	7	15 September 2016	1
22 September 2016	4	Wild World	Bastille	1	22 September 2016	2
22 September 2016	2	Skeleton Tree	Nick Cave and the Bad Seeds	2	22 September 2016	2
22 September 2016	2	Live at the Hollywood Bowl	The Beatles	3	22 September 2016	1
22 September 2016	1	Braver Than We Are	Meat Loaf	4	22 September 2016	1
22 September 2016	1	Kin	KT Tunstall	7	22 September 2016	1
22 September 2016	1	GLA	Twin Atlantic	9	22 September 2016	1
22 September 2016	1	Here	Teenage Fanclub	10	22 September 2016	1
29 September 2016	1	The Complete BBC Sessions	Led Zeppelin	3	29 September 2016	1
29 September 2016	1	Hard II Love	Usher	7	29 September 2016	1
6 October 2016	2	Young as the Morning, Old as the Sea	Passenger	1	6 October 2016	1
6 October 2016	2	Chapter and Verse	Bruce Springsteen	2	6 October 2016	1
6 October 2016	1	Illuminate	Shawn Mendes	3	6 October 2016	1
6 October 2016	1	F E A R	Marillion	4	6 October 2016	1
6 October 2016	1	Breakin' Outta Hell	Airbourne	9	6 October 2016	1
13 October 2016	2	Following My Intuition	Craig David	1	13 October 2016	1
13 October 2016	1	22, A Million	Bon Iver	2	13 October 2016	1
13 October 2016	2	My Universe	The Shires	3	13 October 2016	1
13 October 2016	1	Keep Me Singing	Van Morrison	4	13 October 2016	1
13 October 2016	1	Take Control	Slaves	6	13 October 2016	1
13 October 2016	1	Head Carrier	Pixies	7	13 October 2016	1
20 October 2016	2	Revolution Radio	Green Day	1	20 October 2016	1
20 October 2016	1	In the Now	Barry Gibb	2	20 October 2016	1
20 October 2016	1	The Last Hero	Alter Bridge	3	20 October 2016	1
20 October 2016	1	Stay Together	Kaiser Chiefs	4	20 October 2016	1
20 October 2016	1	Oh My My	OneRepublic	6	20 October 2016	1
20 October 2016	1	Keepin' the Horse Between Me and the Ground	Seasick Steve	8	20 October 2016	1
20 October 2016	1	Day Breaks	Norah Jones	9	20 October 2016	1
20 October 2016	1	All Bright Electric	Feeder	10	20 October 2016	1
27 October 2016	3	Walls	Kings of Leon	1	27 October 2016	1
27 October 2016	4	The Singles	Phil Collins	2	27 October 2016	1
27 October 2016	1	The Wave	Tom Chaplin	3	27 October 2016	1
27 October 2016	1	Be Here Now	Oasis	4	27 October 2016	1
27 October 2016	1	Gameshow	Two Door Cinema Club	5	27 October 2016	1
27 October 2016	1	Superwoman	Rebecca Ferguson	7	27 October 2016	1
27 October 2016	1	Like an Arrow	Blackberry Smoke	8	27 October 2016	1
27 October 2016	1	In Winter	Katie Melua	9	27 October 2016	1
3 November 2016	12	The Wonder of You (#5)	Elvis Presley with the Royal Philharmonic Orchestra	1	3 November 2016	1
3 November 2016	9	Nobody but Me	Michael Bublé	2	3 November 2016	1
3 November 2016	1	Joanne	Lady Gaga	3	3 November 2016	1
3 November 2016	2	You Want It Darker	Leonard Cohen	4	3 November 2016	1
3 November 2016	1	Aquostic II: That's a Fact	Status Quo	7	3 November 2016	1
3 November 2016	1	The Serenity of Suffering	Korn	9	3 November 2016	1
3 November 2016	1	Lazarus (Original Cast Recording)	David Bowie and the New York Cast of Lazarus	10	3 November 2016	1
10 November 2016	4	Back from the Edge	James Arthur	1	10 November 2016	1
10 November 2016	1	Mapping the Rendezvous	Courteeners	4	10 November 2016	1
10 November 2016	1	Can't Touch Us Now	Madness	5	10 November 2016	1
10 November 2016	1	Sleep No More	Jack Savoretti	6	10 November 2016	1
10 November 2016	2	Upon a Different Shore	Alexander Armstrong	8	10 November 2016	2
10 November 2016	1	Greatest Hits	Robbie Williams	9	10 November 2016	1
17 November 2016	8	The Heavy Entertainment Show	Robbie Williams	1	17 November 2016	1
17 November 2016	10	Together (#3)	Michael Ball & Alfie Boe	1	22 December 2016	2
17 November 2016	1	This House Is Not for Sale	Bon Jovi	5	17 November 2016	1
17 November 2016	7	Christmas	Michael Bublé	6	15 December 2016	1
17 November 2016	1	The Ultimate Collection	Roy Orbison	10	17 November 2016	1
24 November 2016	9	24 Hrs	Olly Murs	1	24 November 2016	1
24 November 2016	6	Long Live the Angels	Emeli Sandé	2	24 November 2016	1
24 November 2016	1	Just... Fabulous Rock 'n' Roll	Cliff Richard	4	24 November 2016	1
1 December 2016	29	Glory Days (#7)	Little Mix	1	1 December 2016	5
1 December 2016	1	Hardwired... to Self-Destruct	Metallica	2	1 December 2016	1
1 December 2016	8	24K Magic	Bruno Mars	3	1 December 2016	1
8 December 2016	1	Before the Dawn	Kate Bush	4	8 December 2016	1
8 December 2016	9	Starboy	The Weeknd	5	8 December 2016	1
8 December 2016	1	Falling in Love	Andre Rieu & the Johann Strauss Orchestra	7	8 December 2016	1
8 December 2016	1	Chasing Dreams	Bradley Walsh	10	8 December 2016	1
15 December 2016	7	Blue & Lonesome	The Rolling Stones	1	15 December 2016	1

== Entries by artist ==
The following table shows artists who achieved two or more top 10 entries in 2016, including albums that reached their peak in 2015. The figures only include main artists, with featured artists and appearances on compilation albums not counted individually for each artist. The total number of weeks an artist spent in the top ten in 2016 is also shown.

Entries	Artist	Weeks	Albums
6	David Bowie	25	Best of Bowie, Blackstar, Hunky Dory, Lazarus (Original Cast Recording), Nothing Has Changed: The Very Best of David Bowie, The Rise and Fall of Ziggy Stardust and the Spiders from Mars
3	Prince	8	Purple Rain, The Very Best of Prince, Ultimate Prince
2	Adele	44	21, 25
2	Elvis Presley	25	If I Can Dream, The Wonder of You
2	Jack Savoretti	2	Sleep No More, Written in Scars
2	Little Mix	49	Get Weird, Glory Days
2	Michael Bublé	16	Christmas, Nobody but Me
2	Royal Philharmonic Orchestra	25	If I Can Dream, The Wonder of You

== Notes ==
- Nothing Has Changed: The Best of David Bowie originally peaked at number 9 upon its initial release in 2014. It re-entered the top 10 at its brand new peak of number 5 on 21 January 2016 (week ending) following the death of David Bowie.
- Best of Bowie originally peaked outside the top-ten at number 11 upon its initial release in 2002. It made the top 10 for the first time in January 2016, following David Bowie's death, entering on 28 January (week ending) at number 3 and rising to number-one two weeks later.
- Hunky Dory first entered the UK Albums Chart in 1972 and made the top 10 for the first time in 1973, peaking at number 3. Following David Bowie's death, the album re-entered the top 10 at number 9 on 4 February 2016 (week ending).
- The Rise and Fall of Ziggy Stardust and the Spiders from Mars first entered the top 10 in 1972 and rose to its peak of number 5 in 1973. Following David Bowie's death, the album re-entered the top 10 at number 10 on 4 February 2016 (week ending).
- Ultimate Prince originally peaked at number 24 upon its initial release in 2006. It made the top 10 for the first time in 2007, peaking at number 6. Following Prince's death, the album re-entered the top 10 and reached a brand new peak of number 3.
- The Very Best of Prince originally peaked at number 2 upon its initial release in 2001. Following Prince's death, the album re-entered the top 10 at number 2, the second time the album had made the runner-up spot.
- Purple Rain originally peaked at number 7 upon its initial release in 1984. Following Prince's death, the album re-entered the top 10 and reached a brand new peak of number 4.
- All Over the World: The Very Best of Electric Light Orchestra originally peaked at number 6 upon its initial release in 2005. It re-entered the top 10 in both 2011 and 2012 and would ultimately reach its peak of number-one in 2016 following Electric Light Orchestra's performance at that year's Glastonbury festival.
- 21 originally peaked at number-one upon its initial release in 2011.
- Legend originally peaked at number-one upon its initial release in 1984. It re-entered the top 10 in 2014, this time reaching number 7.
- Greatest Hits originally peaked at number-one upon its initial release in 2004. It re-entered the top 10 in 2006, this time reaching number 5.
- Figure includes album that peaked in 2015.

== See also ==
- 2016 in British music
- List of number-one albums from the 2010s (UK)
