= List of songs recorded by Jack Savoretti =

This is a comprehensive list of songs by English folk singer Jack Savoretti.

== Original songs ==
All songs written by Jack Savoretti.

Title	Album/Single	Year
Apologies	Between The Minds	2007
Before the Storm	Before The Storm	2012
Better Change	Harder Than Easy (bonus track)	2009
Between the Minds	Between The Minds	2007
Blackrain	Between The Minds	2007
Blood on My Hands	Not Worthy EP	2013
Breaking News	Harder Than Easy	2009
Breaking the Rules	Before The Storm	2012
Broken Glass	Sweet Hurt EP	2014
Changes	Before The Storm	2012
Chemical Courage	Between The Minds	2007
Come Shine a Light	Before The Storm	2012
Crazy Fool	Before The Storm	2012
Crazy Town	Take Me Home EP	2012
Dreamers	Between The Minds	2007
Dr Frankenstein	Between The Minds	2007
For the Last Time	Before The Storm	2012
Gypsy Love	Between The Minds – Deluxe Edition	2008
Harder Than Easy	Harder Than Easy	2009
Hate & Love	-	2012
Him & Her	-	2009
Jack In A Box	Sweet Hurt EP	2014
Killing Man	Between The Minds	2007
Knock Knock	Before The Storm	2012
Last Call	Before The Storm	2012
Lay You Down	Without	2006
Lifetime	Before The Storm	2012
Lovely Fool	Between The Minds	2007
Lost America	Harder Than Easy	2009
Lucy	Between The Minds – Deluxe Edition	2008
Map Of The World	Harder Than Easy	2009
Mourning After	Dreamers	2007
Mother	Harder Than Easy	2009
No One's Aware	Between The Minds	2007
Not Worthy	Before The Storm	2012
Once Upon A Street	Between The Minds	2007
One	Dreamers	2007
One Day	Post Grad OST	2009
One Man Band	Between The Minds – Deluxe Edition	2008
Patriot	Harder Than Easy	2009
Sacred Land	Dreamers	2007
Soldier's Eyes	Between The Minds	2007
Song For a Friend	-	2009
Songs From Different Times	Harder Than Easy	2009
Sweet Hurt	Sweet Hurt EP	2014
Take Me Home	Before The Storm	2012
The Hurt	Sweet Hurt EP	2014
The Proposal	Before The Storm	2012
Russian Roulette	Harder Than Easy	2009
Vagabond	Before The Storm	2012
Weightless	Without	2006
Without	Between The Minds	2007
Written In Scars	-	2013
Wonder	Harder Than Easy	2009

== Covers ==
Title	Album	Year	Original artist	Writer
Ring Of Fire	-^{*}	2006–	Johnny Cash	June Carter, Merle Kilgore
Northern Sky	Harder Than Easy	2009	Nick Drake	

Notes

- ^* Live Performance

== Unreleased songs ==
Title	Period
Dare Devil Lindberg	2008–
Rosaline	2008–
