= Miss Italia (disambiguation) =

Miss Italia is a beauty pageant awarding prizes every year to young, female contestants from Italy.

Miss Italia may also refer to:

- Miss Italia (Patty Pravo album), 1978
- Miss Italia (Ditonellapiaga album), 2026
- Miss Italia, a 2024 album by Jack Savoretti
- My Beautiful Daughter (Italian: Miss Italia), a 1950 Italian comedy film
