= When You're Smiling (disambiguation) =

When You're Smiling is an American popular song written in 1928.

When You're Smiling may also refer to:

- When You're Smiling (film), a 1950 musical film by Joseph Santley
- When You're Smiling (Bradley Walsh album), 2017
- When You're Smiling (Regis Philbin album), 2004
- "When You're Smiling and Astride Me", a song by American folk musician Josh Tillman
