= Without =

Without may refer to:

- Without, an English preposition
- "Without" (The X-Files), an episode in the eighth season of The X-Files
- Without, a film that premiered at the 2011 Slamdance Film Festival
- "Without", a song by Jack Savoretti from the album Between the Minds, 2007
- "Without", a song by Sarah Blasko from the album Eternal Return, 2015
- "Without", a song by Pino, 2021
- "Without", a song by Brett Kissel from the album What Is Life?, 2021
