= Spin Star =

2008 British game show

- Genre: Game show
- Presented by: Bradley Walsh
- Country of origin: United Kingdom
- Original language: English
- No. of series: 1
- No. of episodes: 30

Production
- Production location: Pinewood Studios
- Running time: 60 minutes (inc. adverts)
- Production company: Initial

Original release
- Network: ITV
- Release: 10 November – 19 December 2008

Spin Star is a British television game show that was broadcast on ITV, and was hosted by Bradley Walsh. On each episode, five contestants answer questions to build up cash prizes that can be won by a sixth. Question categories, difficulty levels, values, and respondents are determined by a five-reel slot machine known as the Moneyspinner.

On each episode, the contestant who has been on the show the longest is designated the "Spin Star" for that day and is the only one eligible to win any money. Each contestant fills this role for one day, then leaves the show immediately afterward with whatever they have won. The other five contestants are "Daily Players," whose answers increase the money that can be won by the Spin Star. Every contestant appears on the show for six episodes - five as a Daily Player, one as the Spin Star - and a new Daily Player is introduced on each episode to fill the seat vacated by the departing Spin Star.

== Gameplay ==
From left to right, the reels on the Moneyspinner initially contain the following.

- One reel of categories, each assigned a difficulty rating of one (easy), two (medium), or three stars (hard). Categories are replaced as they are used.
- Three reels of Daily Player names; each name appears on every reel.
- One reel of cash values, which increase throughout the game.

All five Daily Players are spotted £500 each to begin the game. The Spin Star is the only contestant who operates the Moneyspinner.

=== Round 1: Speed Spins ===
On each spin, three questions in the spun category are asked to the Daily Players whose names come up. A correct answer adds the value to that individual's bank; wrong answers carry no penalty. If the same Daily Player's name appears twice on one spin, they receive two questions; if three times, they receive three questions at double value.

This round ends after three spins. The maximum value on the money reel is £2,000 on the first spin, £3,000 on the second, and £4,000 on the third.

=== Round 2 ===
The Spin Star is again given three spins, with money reel maximums of £5,000, £7,500, and £10,000 on each. Play proceeds as in Round 1, with the following changes.

- If the Spin Star is dissatisfied with the result of a spin, they may re-spin two or more of the reels, but not a single reel by itself.
- Two "Brain Buster" spaces are added to the category reel, indicating questions at a difficulty level beyond three stars. These spaces stay on the reel even after coming up in a spin.
- Two "Bank Buster" spaces are added to the money reel. If one of these comes up and a Daily Player misses their question, their bank is reset to zero.

=== Round 3 ===
The totals accumulated by the five Daily Players are placed on the three centre reels of the Moneyspinner, with each total appearing twice on every reel. One Bank Buster is placed on the leftmost of these reels, two on the centre one, and three on the rightmost. The money reel is taken out of play.

The Spin Star spins the category reel, with one re-spin allowed if an unwanted category comes up, and is asked three questions. Each correct answer removes one Bank Buster from a reel, working left to right, while each miss adds one more. After each question, the Spin Star spins the reel affected by it. If a cash total comes up, it is credited to the Spin Star's bank; if a Bank Buster comes up, the bank is reset to zero. After the third question and spin, the Spin Star wins all the money in their bank and leaves the show.

The maximum potential bank total was £568,500. To achieve this result, the same Daily Player's name and the maximum question value would first have to come up on every name/money reel in Rounds 1 and 2, and they would have to answer every question correctly (at double value). That Daily Player's total (£189,500) would then have to appear on all three reels in Round 3.
