= Barney Walsh =

English actor and television presenter (born 1997)

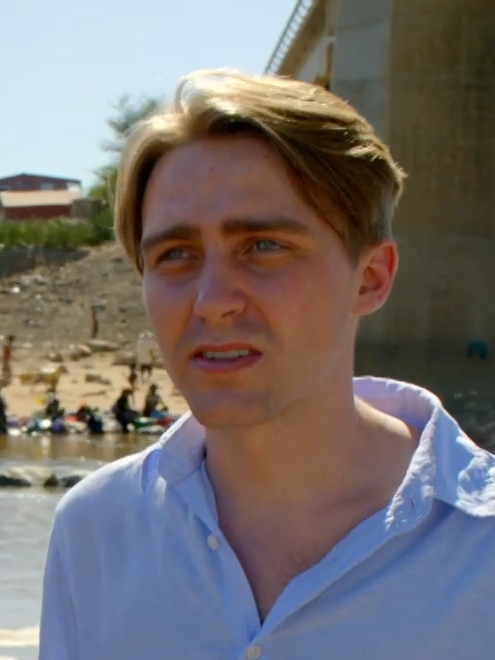
- Walsh in 2020
- Born: Barney Charles Peter Walsh; 2 December 1997 (age 28); Westminster, London, England
- Education: Chigwell School, Essex
- Alma mater: East 15 Acting School, Essex; Guildhall School of Music and Drama
- Occupations: Actor; television presenter
- Years active: 2013–present
- Employer(s): ITV; BBC
- Television: Bradley Walsh & Son: Breaking Dad; Casualty; Gladiators
- Father: Bradley Walsh

Barney Charles Peter Walsh (born 2 December 1997) is an English actor and television presenter. He began his career in various acting roles including Law & Order: UK and Doctors, before working alongside his father Bradley Walsh on several projects, including the ITV series Bradley Walsh & Son: Breaking Dad since 2019 and the BBC's revival of Gladiators since 2024. Since 2023, he has appeared in the BBC drama Casualty as Cameron Mickelthwaite.

== Early life ==
Walsh was born on 2 December 1997 in Westminster, London. He is the son of comedian, actor and television presenter Bradley Walsh and his wife Donna. He has an older half sister (b. 1982) from his father’s previous relationship.

== Education ==
Walsh was educated at Chigwell School, a private boarding and day school in the town of Chigwell, in Essex, and the East 15 Acting School, in Loughton (also in Essex), followed by the Guildhall School of Music and Drama, in London.

== Career ==
As an actor, Walsh has appeared in British television series such as The Larkins, Death in Paradise, Doctors and Law & Order: UK. He played a teenage King Arthur in 2017 Guy Ritchie feature film King Arthur: Legend of the Sword. In 2023, he joined the cast of Casualty as Cameron Mickelthwaite. In 2021, he took part in All Star Musicals. He has also made appearances on CelebAbility and Celebrity Catchphrase in 2021 and 2023 respectively.

Walsh co-presented the Miss World beauty pageant in 2017 and 2018, both of which were held in Sanya, China. Alongside his father Bradley, he appeared in the ITV series Bradley Walsh & Son: Breaking Dad, a travel series in which Walsh takes his father on a coming of age road trip across several countries. The fifth series of the show premiered on ITV on 10 January 2023. In May 2023, the pair were confirmed to be co-presenting a reboot of Gladiators together.

== Personal life ==
In 2020, Walsh became a dog-owner during the COVID-19 pandemic lockdown. In 2022 Walsh was revealed to be dating Puerto Rican model and Miss World 2016 Stephanie Del Valle. In 2026, Walsh was banned from driving for six months after breaking a temporary speed limit on a stretch of the M4 motorway near Bristol.

== Filmography ==
Year	Title	Role	Notes	
2013	Law & Order: UK	Kit	1 episode	Guest
2015	Doctors	Tom Enders	3 episodes	Guest
2017	King Arthur: Legend of the Sword	Young Arthur	Film	Guest
2019	Indulgence	Charlie		Guest
2019–present	Bradley Walsh & Son: Breaking Dad	Himself	6 series	Alongside Bradley Walsh
2021–2022	The Larkins	PC Harness	Recurring role	Guest
2021	All Star Musicals	Himself	Contestant	Guest
2021	CelebAbility	Himself	Guest	Guest
2023	Death in Paradise	Ryan Cook	1 episode	Guest
2023	Celebrity Catchphrase	Himself	Guest	Guest
2023–present	Casualty	Cameron Mickelthwaite	Main role	Main Cast
2024–present	Gladiators	Presenter	35 episodes	Alongside Bradley Walsh
