= Come On Down! The Game Show Story =

- Genre: Documentary
- Presented by: Bradley Walsh
- Country of origin: United Kingdom
- Original language: English
- No. of series: 1
- No. of episodes: 4

Production
- Running time: 60 minutes (inc. adverts)
- Production company: Shiver Productions

Original release
- Network: ITV
- Release: 10 August – 31 August 2014

Related
- ITV Specials

Come on Down! The Game Show Story is a British documentary that aired from 10 to 31 August 2014 on ITV and is presented by Bradley Walsh.
