= Cash Trapped =

British game show

- Genre: Game show
- Created by: Bradley Walsh
- Presented by: Bradley Walsh
- Theme music composer: Francis MacDonald
- Country of origin: United Kingdom
- Original language: English
- No. of series: 3
- No. of episodes: 65

Production
- Production locations: The London Studios (2016); BBC Elstree Centre (2017–2019)
- Running time: 60 minutes (inc. adverts)
- Production company: Possessed

Original release
- Network: ITV
- Release: 1 August 2016 – 20 December 2019

Cash Trapped is a British game show which aired on ITV from 1 August 2016 to 20 December 2019. Presented and based on an idea by Bradley Walsh, the show pits contestants against one another in a contest to amass and win prize money by answering questions in various categories.

== Gameplay ==
Six contestants compete through four rounds on each episode. All six remain on the show until one of them successfully "escapes" in the final round. Beginning with series 2, any contestant who wishes to leave the show at the end of an episode may do so, but must forfeit their accumulated money; they are replaced by a new contestant who starts with no winnings.

=== Round 1: Last One Standing / Last Man Standing ===
The contestants answer a series of toss-up questions on the buzzer. A correct response allows the contestant to temporarily freeze out one opponent; a miss freezes that contestant instead. The last remaining contestant chooses one category from a board of six and is asked a multiple-choice question with six answer options. A correct answer awards £1,000 and allows the contestant to "cash trap" one opponent, eliminating them from play for the rest of the round, but a miss results in the contestant being cash trapped instead.

Each category is removed from the board once it has been used, and the frozen contestants are then reinstated. The process continues until all six categories are gone; the last contestant standing plays the final category without the need for a toss-up.

Toss-up questions are worth £100 each in the first and third series.

=== Round 2: Head-to-Head ===
All six contestants are reinstated. A toss-up question is asked, and a correct answer allows the contestant to choose one category from a new board of six and challenge an opponent. The two alternate selecting answers to a question from a group of six, starting with the winner of the toss-up. The contestant who selects the correct answer wins £2,000 (£1,000 in the third series) and cash traps the opponent. If a contestant misses a toss-up, a new one is asked and they must sit it out.

As in Round 1, each category is removed from play after being used. The last contestant standing receives a question in the final category alone and has one chance to choose the correct answer for the same value as the other five that were played in the round.

Toss-up questions are worth £200 each in the first series, and £250 in the third.

=== Round 3: Catch-Up / The Accumulator ===
All six contestants are reinstated again, and each has 45 seconds to answer as many quick-fire questions as possible, receiving £500 per correct answer. They play in ascending order of their scores at the end of Round 2. In the event of a tie going into this round, the contestant who has banked the lowest total in previous shows (see below) plays first. From Series 3, this round is called The Accumulator.

At the end of this round, the highest-scoring player attempts to escape with their money in Round 4. Any ties for high score are broken with a sudden-death toss-up question.

=== Round 4: The Escape ===
The high scorer after Round 3 is dubbed the day's "escapee" and has a chance to win their total, consisting of both that day's winnings and any money they have banked (see below). The clock is set to 1 minute, and the contestants are asked a series of quick-fire questions on the buzzer. Each correct answer by the escapee allows them to cash trap one opponent, but a miss deducts 10 seconds from the clock. A correct answer by an opponent has no effect except for the time used to answer, but a miss causes them to become cash trapped.

If the escapee cash traps all five opponents before time runs out, they win their total and the others receive nothing. All six leave the show, and six new contestants are brought in for the next episode. If time runs out, all six contestants return for the next episode, with the escapee's total being reset to zero and the opponents' totals being banked. Upon reaching the Escape Round, each contestant's banked total is added to their current day's winnings to determine the overall money they have at stake. If a contestant decides to leave, they forfeit their entire total and a new contestant takes their place on the next episode.

Previously banked totals have no effect on the order of play in Round 3 or the final standings, except in the case of a tie for the former.

== Reception ==
Upon its premiere, viewers criticised the complexity of the format, and noted a continuity error which revealed the outcome of the first episode at the start of the show. Chaser Paul Sinha took to social media shortly after the episode aired and described the first episode of Cash Trapped as "weird". Frances Taylor of BT said that the show was "somewhat enjoyable. And if nothing else, the concept was innovative and offered something different to the majority of quiz shows on television right now. The beauty of The Chase is not only the thrill of, well, the chase – but also in the interactions between the Chasers, the contestants and Walsh himself. Cash Trapped was certainly enjoyable, but it wasn't a classic. The show was great."

== Transmissions ==
Series	Start date	End date	Episodes
1	1 August 2016	12 August 2016	10
2	31 July 2017	1 September 2017	25
3	11 November 2019	20 December 2019	30
