= Odd One In =

- Genre: Panel show
- Presented by: Bradley Walsh
- Starring: Peter Andre; Jason Manford
- Country of origin: United Kingdom
- Original language: English
- No. of series: 2
- No. of episodes: 16

Production
- Production location: BBC Elstree Centre
- Running time: 45 minutes (inc. adverts)
- Production company: Zeppotron

Original release
- Network: ITV
- Release: 17 July 2010 – 18 December 2011

Odd One In is a British panel show, broadcast on ITV. It is hosted by Bradley Walsh. The regular Home Team are Peter Andre and Jason Manford, the Away Team are two guest celebrities who change each week.

== Format ==
In each round, the teams are presented with a lineup of people who all claim to have a particular unusual trait or skill (e.g. being able to hold their breath underwater for more than five minutes), but only one of them is telling the truth. The teams may ask questions of the lineup members in order to determine the truth-teller. At the end of the round, each team may make one guess as to which one is the "Odd One In," receiving one point for a correct choice. Where appropriate, the lineup members are invited to demonstrate their purported skill.

During the first series, the members in one section of the audience are given keypads on which to lock in their guesses as to the Odd One In. After the penultimate lineup has been played, the high scorer is invited to compete for a £5,000 cash prize by correctly spotting the final Odd One In, with help from the two teams and the rest of the audience.

The keypads and cash prize are eliminated for the second series. The final round is replaced with a "Familiar Faces" lineup, consisting of one or more members from each of the previous rounds; the teams must determine which is the Odd One in as before.

== Transmissions ==
Series	Episodes	Originally released	
Series	Episodes	First released	Last released
1	8	17 July 2010	4 September 2010
2	8	18 June 2011	18 December 2011

== Episodes ==
The coloured backgrounds denote the result of each of the shows:

– Indicates the Home Team won.
– Indicates the Away Team won.
– Indicates the game ended in a draw.

Episode viewing figures from BARB.

=== Series 1 (2010) ===
No. overall	No. in series	Title	Away team	Original release date	UK viewers (millions)
1	1	"Episode 1"	Laurence Llewelyn-Bowen and Katherine Kelly	17 July 2010	3.030
Line Ups; Who has the fake beard? ― Who is part of a roller skating act? ― Which is the record breaking Glider pilot? ― Who married a pineapple? ― Which is the real nun? ― Who is doing a handstand?
2	2	"Episode 2"	Eamonn Holmes and Ruth Langsford	24 July 2010	2.810
Line Ups; Who is the hairiest man? ― Who is the real Frenchman? ― Who is the real hypnotist? ― Who is doing football keepie-uppies? ― Who is lifting real weights?
3	3	"Episode 3"	Katy Brand and Joe Swash	31 July 2010	2.860
Line Ups; Who is wearing a wig? ― Who is the real Russian? ― Who is the real stunts performer? ― Who is the real winner of Lithuania's Got Talent? ― Who is doing the Caribbean dance?
4	4	"Episode 4"	Lorraine Kelly and Julian Clary	7 August 2010	3.810
Line Ups; Who is the real hula-hoop dancer? ― Who is the real London geezer? ― What animal can go on a skateboard? ― Who is part of a balancing act? ― Who is the professional whistler?
5	5	"Episode 5"	Angela Griffin and Mark Durden-Smith	14 August 2010	3.190
Line Ups; Who is the real riverdancer? ― Who is the real contortionist? ― Who is the real Mexican? ― Who is getting shocked? ― Who can do a backflip from a wall? ― Who is the professional hairdresser?
6	6	"Episode 6"	Donal MacIntyre and Sarah Millican	21 August 2010	4.260
Line Ups; Who has a fake moustache? ― Who can pull a chariot with their teeth? ― Who is the real woman that a man married? ― Who is the musical genius? ― Who is the professional escapologist? ― Which pair of legs belong to a woman?
7	7	"Episode 7"	Craig Gazey and Angellica Bell	28 August 2010	3.740
Line Ups; Who holds the current Guinness World Record for having stretchy skin? ― Who is the sibling of a celebrity? ― Who is the current champion for eating stingy nettles? ― Which Coronation Street star is having their feet licked by a dog? ― Who is actually playing the electric guitar?
8	8	"Episode 8"	Lynda Bellingham and Gino D'Acampo	4 September 2010	4.550
Line Ups; Who is the real tapdancer? ― Which contestant changed their name by deed poll to Captain Fantastic faster than Superman Spider-Man Batman Wolverine Hulk and the Flash combined? ― Which couple have been married for over fifty years? ― Who of the line up is fluent in Mandarin? ― Who is actually beatboxing?

=== Series 2 (2011) ===
No. overall	No. in series	Title	Home team	Away team	Original release date	UK viewers (millions)
9	1	"Episode 1"	Peter Andre and Jason Manford	Jenny Eclair and Jack Whitehall	18 June 2011	3.510
Line Ups; Who is really Welsh? – Who injured themselves while doing something with a sausage? – Who's the real Karate champion? – Who has a famous voice? and for the familiar faces round – Who won a TV talent contest in Spain?
10	2	"Episode 2"	Peter Andre and Jason Manford	Eamonn Holmes and Ruth Langsford	25 June 2011	3.550
Line Ups; Who is the real Italian? – Who can walk a tightrope? – Who's a genuine royal? – Who is known as the 'Human Windmill'? and for the familiar faces round – Who is the real conga player in a Brazilian band?
11	3	"I'm a Celebrity...Get Me Out of Here! Special"	Caroline Flack and Russell Kane	Joe Pasquale and Siân Lloyd	2 July 2011	3.330
Line Ups; Who is the real sport stacker? – Who eats something unusual as part of their job? – Who is the real Scotsman? – Who has had a silent role in a well-known TV programme? and for the familiar faces round – Who can do a handstand and shoot an arrow with their feet?
12	4	"Episode 4"	Peter Andre and Jason Manford	Stephen K. Amos and Stacey Solomon	9 July 2011	2.770
Line Ups; Who is the real player of street basketball? – Who can sing like a woman? – Who is the real country bumpkin? – Who is a super-citizen? and for the familiar faces round – Who is the real fast player of a violin?
13	5	"Episode 5"	Peter Andre and Jason Manford	Joe Swash and Lorraine Kelly	16 July 2011	Under 2,800
Line Ups; Who is the real Australian? – Who is the real cheerleader? – Who holds the Guinness World Record for stuffing 400 drinking straws in their mouth? – Who is the real Bollywood actor? and for the familiar faces round – Who can play the trombone?
14	6	"Episode 6"	Peter Andre and Jason Manford	Sarah Millican and Stephen Mulhern	23 July 2011	2.890
Line Ups; Who is the real American? – Who can hold their breath underwater for five minutes? – Who can balance a table (that someone is to sit on) with their mouth? – Who has fake sideburns? and for the familiar faces round – Who can jump on a pogo-stick?
15	7	"Soap Special"	Michelle Keegan and John Thomson	Charlie Baker and Adele Silva	30 July 2011	2.900
Line Ups; Who is the real Greek? – Who has a fake tattoo? – Who can lift a basket with their ears? – Who has a fake mullet? and for the familiar faces round – Who is part of a knife-throwing double act?
16	8	"Christmas Special"	Peter Andre and Jason Manford	Carol Vorderman and Mark Watson	18 December 2011	2.980
Who has a voice of an angel? – Who is the real pretentious Santa? – Which is the fake Christmas tradition? – Which is the real couple? and for the familiar faces round – Who can play the tuba?

== International versions ==
Country	Name	Presenter	Channel	Date of transmission
Italy	Colpo d'occhio - L'apparenza inganna	Max Giusti	Rai 1	21 August – 10 September 2011
Spain	Salta a la vista	Roberto Vilar	Cuatro	7 November 2011 – 12 January 2012
Ukraine	Тільки один Til’ky odyn	Leonid Senkevych	TRK Ukrayina	13 January – 30 March 2012
Vietnam	Người bí ẩn	Trấn Thành; Trường Giang	HTV7	30 March 2014 – 8 September 2019

Other international versions were aired in Germany and Chile.
