= Keep It in the Family (British game show) =

- Genre: Game show
- Presented by: Bradley Walsh
- Country of origin: United Kingdom
- Original language: English
- No. of series: 2
- No. of episodes: 13 (inc. 1 special)

Production
- Production location: BBC Elstree Centre
- Production companies: ITV Studios and Over the Top Productions

Original release
- Network: ITV
- Release: 26 October 2014 – 19 December 2015

Keep It in the Family is a British game show that aired on ITV from 26 October 2014 to 19 December 2015 and was hosted by Bradley Walsh.

== Format ==
Two families of four participate in a series of rounds for the chance to win prizes, including a family holiday. The children take the lead in the show rather than the parents. The rounds feature family members nominated for routines, dressing up as TV characters and trying to guess phrases based on clues given by grandmothers. Celebrities appear in the show and may be dropped down a trapdoor depending on the prizes chosen by the contestants; these celebrities include those known for The X Factor, Coronation Street, and Britain's Got Talent.

== Transmissions ==
=== Series ===
Series	Start date	End date	Episodes
1	26 October 2014	30 November 2014	6
2	8 August 2015	19 September 2015	7

=== Special ===
Date	Entitle
19 December 2015	Christmas Special

== Reception ==
The Guardian said that although the show "shouldn't work", it was well-suited to the presenter, calling Walsh "a virtuoso of amiable schtick".
