= Bradley Walsh & Son: Breaking Dad =

British television series

- Directed by: Phil Ashton
- Starring: Bradley Walsh; Barney Walsh
- Narrated by: Alexander Armstrong
- Country of origin: United Kingdom
- Original language: English
- No. of seasons: 7
- No. of episodes: 41

Production
- Executive producer: Dan Baldwin
- Producers: Robert Fletcher; Molly Sayers
- Running time: 30 minutes including adverts 60 minutes (Christmas special) including adverts
- Production company: Hungry Bear Media

Original release
- Network: ITV
- Release: 2 January 2019 – present

Bradley & Barney Walsh: Breaking Dad (titled Bradley Walsh & Son: Breaking Dad in series 1) is a British television series in which the comedian and presenter Bradley Walsh is taken by his son Barney on a coming-of-age road trip across several countries. To date all episodes have been narrated by Alexander Armstrong. The title of the series is a play on the American crime drama Breaking Bad. The sixth series premiered on 1 April 2025. On 27 March 2026 it was announced by ITV that the show would return for a seventh series.

== Overview ==
Bradley Walsh and his son Barney visit countries in an RV whilst taking part in challenges along the way.

== Episodes ==
Series	Episodes	Originally released	
Series	Episodes	First released	Last released
1	4	2 January 2019	23 January 2019
2	6	8 January 2020	12 February 2020
3	6	11 January 2021	15 February 2021
Christmas Special		24 December 2021	
4	6	17 January 2022	21 February 2022
5	7	10 January 2023	14 February 2023
6	6	1 April 2025	6 May 2025
7	6	1 May 2026	12 June 2026

=== Series 1 (2019) ===
No.	Title	Original release date	UK viewers (millions)
1	"LA (Los Angeles)"	2 January 2019	6.34
The duo begin their trip by picking up their 36-foot, 7.5 tonne RV from their starting point in the city of Los Angeles. They travel straight to Venice Beach where they play volleyball, and then move on to a workout on Muscle Beach with two burly personal trainers. The day ends with the duo driving to Banning Airport in California.
2	"Arizona"	9 January 2019	6.67
Barney and Bradley leave LA behind them, and head into the Mojave Desert towards Arizona, arriving at the famous Route 66. On the way, they stop by at Roy’s Café to have their picture taken with the café’s sign. Their next stop is Lake Havasu City, followed by Arizona Cowboy College deep in the Sonoran Desert. As the ranch owners review their work as cowboys, Barney and Bradley round off their day with a singalong around the campfire.
3	"Texas"	16 January 2019	6.40
Barney and Bradley visit a space centre, learn how to fire tanks and hear tales about UFOs. They follow in the footsteps of astronauts such as John Glenn as they undertake centrifuge training, letting them experience five times the gravitational force than that on earth. They then speak to some UFO enthusiasts on the outskirts of the city of Houston.
4	"New Orleans"	23 January 2019	N/A (<6.64) (Note: Not reported in the weekly top 15 programmes for four-screen viewer ratings.)
Bradley meets the Captain of The Natchez boat and experiences the jazz on board. Soon after, Barney reveals he has arranged for them to meet a Voodoo High Priest for some energy cleansing. After the session ends, the duo head 75 miles out of the city to the small town of Gibson, where they find the home of many alligators. The final stop of the trip is New Orleans's famous French Quarter, the home of the Mardi Gras parade.

=== Series 2 (2020) ===
No.	Title	Original release date	UK viewers (millions)
1	"Florida"	8 January 2020	5.97
Bradley and Barney begin their second series in Florida, where they visit the Palm Beach International Raceway and the home of the author Earnest Hemmingway, and get close up to sharks.
2	"Smoky Mountains"	15 January 2020	N/A (<6.22)
The duo head to the Great Smoky Mountains on the Tennessee-North Carolina border and go canoeing. After a swig of whiskey, they experience clog dancing and chopping wood with the aid of competitive lumberjacks.
3	"Kentucky"	22 January 2020	N/A (<6.27)
For the next leg of their journey, Bradley and Barney visit the Red River Gorge in Kentucky, before heading to the supposedly haunted Poasttown Elementary School in Middletown, Ohio. The next day, they travel to Louisville, birthplace of legendary boxer Muhammad Ali, where they follow in his footsteps by sparring at the local boxing gym. At the end of a long day, Barney rewards his dad with a well-earned meal at a KFC restaurant in Kentucky - the home state of the chain's founder Colonel Harland Sanders.
4	"Ohio"	29 January 2020	N/A (<5.83)
This time, the actor and his son arrive in Ohio, where they head for Dayton - the birthplace of aviation - before the pair attend a local rodeo later that evening. Brad soon realises that they are not just there to spectate on the sport, they are also expected to take part. However, a nasty fall from an angry bull means Brad spends the rest of the night in hospital.
5	"Vermont"	5 February 2020	5.97
Bradley is on the mend following his rodeo injury and determined to get back behind the wheel of the RV. As the pair continue on their journey, Barney is thrilled to be celebrating his birthday with a trip to the iconic Niagara Falls. Later, Bradley and Barney take the RV on a small cargo ferry as they head to Vermont. Here, the pair have a go at ice climbing, which proves treacherous for them and the crew, before a spot of dog sledding through the frozen wilderness and an inevitable race through the forests.
6	"Maine"	12 February 2020	N/A (<6.04)
On the final leg of their journey, the pair continue through the snow to New Hampshire. Here, they meet rally-driving champion Tim O'Neil who gives them a crash course in driving in the ice and snow before they take on an intense time trial. The pair travel on to Maine, where they take part in some wilderness training, before bidding farewell to the RV and heading out into the extremely choppy seas for some lobster fishing. Before heading home, the pair look back on some of their favourite moments from the trip.

=== Series 3 (2021) ===
The third series was originally planned for broadcast from 4 January 2021, but was pulled back a week because of Boris Johnson's Prime Ministerial broadcast.

No.	Title	Original release date	UK viewers (millions)
1	"Netherlands"	11 January 2021	6.11
In the first episode of the series they'll be travelling from their home in Essex all the way to The Netherlands, where they try out one of the country’s oldest sports, canal jumping. The action continues when the pair don lycra for a spot of velodrome track cycling, alongside a world champion, and before they leave the country, father and son take on the world’s tallest freestanding climbing wall.
2	"Germany"	18 January 2021	5.82
Bradley and Barney continue their European adventure in Germany. They head to the city of Frankfurt, where Brad is pushed to the edge, as he attempts to abseil down the side of a building, facing forwards. The boys also make a stop at a bratwurst themed hotel and soak up some local Bavarian culture when they have a go at Finger Wrestling. The pair finish off their time in Germany with an adventure in the mountains.
3	"Switzerland"	25 January 2021	5.88
The next stop on Bradley and Barney’s European road trip is Switzerland. They take in the views with a ride on a mountain rollercoaster, before exercising their vocal chords when they try the Swiss tradition of yodeling. The following day, Barney arranges a unique way for them to enjoy some local cheese, and then drive to the Contra Dam, where Barney reveals they are about to attempt one of James Bond’s most iconic stunts, a 220 metre-high bungee jump.
4	"Slovenia"	1 February 2021	5.54
This week the pair head to Slovenia where Bradley’s passion for bikes gives Barney an excuse to take his dad motocross racing, which turns out to be a very slippery challenge. After hearing that 1 in 200 people in Slovenia are beekeepers, they make a stop to meet one. They are then treated to some unusual honey therapies. Upon reaching the capital city of Ljubljana, things take a turn when the pair join Slovenia’s national Quidditch team, followed by a trip towards the mountains in Planica, where they have a go at ski jumping. Their stay in Slovenia ends with a visit to a cave.
5	"Italy: Part 1"	8 February 2021	5.88
For the penultimate leg of their journey, Bradley and Barney head to Italy, starting in Lake Garda, where Barney surprises his dad by explaining they'll be running off the top of Monte Baldo and paragliding over the lake below. Soon after, Bradley takes a dip in the lake when he tries paddleboard yoga. The next day they travel to the River Po for a boat trip, as Bradley is treated to a hair-raising ride in a Formula 1 speed boat. They then head towards the coast for a surprise when father and son are invited to the home of opera superstar, Andrea Bocelli.
6	"Italy: Part 2"	15 February 2021	5.92
Barney and Bradley Walsh embark on the final leg of their European road trip, as they continue to explore Italy. Having reached Rome, they take a trip back in time to battle it out as gladiators. They continue south and make a stop to soak up the views from a sky high zipwire. As the boys reach their final stop on the Amalfi Coast, they get the chance to swim in the sea, but they'll have to cliff dive in first.

=== Christmas Special (2021) ===
No.	Title	Original release date	UK viewers (millions)
1	"Iceland"	24 December 2021	N/A

=== Series 4 (2022) ===
No.	Title	Original release date	UK viewers (millions)
1	"Croatia"	17 January 2022	N/A
Bradley and Barney Walsh embark on a 3000 mile journey through Europe, starting off in the sunny south of Croatia where the pair go head-to-head on aqua bikes.
2	"Hungary"	24 January 2022	N/A
Bradley and Barney say hello to Hungary, where the boys take to Lake Balaton for some high-speed catamaran sailing before sampling some world-famous goulash.
3	"Poland"	31 January 2022	N/A
The boys take in a spot of sightseeing in Krakow, before they don wetsuits and head to a freezing cold lake to try out water blobbing.
4	"Denmark (Scandinavia)"	7 February 2022	N/A
The boys arrive in Denmark for the Scandinavian leg of their tour. Bradley's fear of heights is pushed to the limits with a visit to an offshore wind turbine.
5	"Sweden (Scandinavia)"	14 February 2022	N/A
6	"Norway (Scandinavia)"	21 February 2022	N/A

=== Series 5 (2023) ===
No.	Title	Original release date	UK viewers (millions)
1	"Mexico: Part 1"	10 January 2023	N/A
2	"Mexico: Part 2"	10 January 2023	N/A
3	"Guatemala"	17 January 2023	N/A
4	"Nicaragua"	24 January 2023	N/A
5	"Costa Rica: Part 1"	31 January 2023	N/A
6	"Costa Rica: Part 2"	7 February 2023	N/A
7	"Panama"	14 February 2023	N/A

=== Series 6 (2025) ===
No.	Title	Original release date	UK viewers (millions)
1	"Tokyo"	1 April 2025	N/A
2	"Tokyo to Gifu"	8 April 2025	N/A
3	"Osaka"	15 April 2025	N/A
4	"Thailand (Southern Thailand)"	22 April 2025	N/A
5	"Thailand (Bangkok)"	29 April 2025	N/A
6	"Thailand (Chiang Mai)"	6 May 2025	N/A

=== Series 7 (2026) ===
No.	Title	Original release date	UK viewers (millions)
1	"Sydney"	1 May 2026	TBD
2	"Into the Country"	8 May 2026	TBD
3	"Gold Coast"	15 May 2026	TBD
4	"Brisbane to Rockhampton"	22 May 2026	TBD
5	"The Outback and Whitsundays"	29 May 2026	TBD
6	"Cairns"	12 June 2026	TBD

== Reception ==
The Times stated, "Bradley Walsh and his son took a good-natured road trip to the US, but it all seemed like an excuse to get Walsh Jr some TV exposure."

The series achieved average viewing figures of 5 million an episode, making it Britain's highest rating celebrity travelogue in nearly 10 years.

A critical Radio Times review said that the show had "a distinct feel of scripted banter" and that Bradley Walsh was in "his least-convincing role to date".
