= Europiana =

Studio album by Jack Savoretti
- Released: 25 June 2021
- Studio: Abbey Road, London
- Length: 45:43
- Label: EMI
- Producer: Cam Blackwood

Jack Savoretti chronology
Singing to Strangers (2019)	Europiana (2021)	Miss Italia (2024)

Professional ratings
Review scores
Source	Rating
The Arts Desk	3/5 stars
Retropop	5/5 stars

Europiana is the seventh studio album by English singer-songwriter Jack Savoretti, released on 25 June 2021 through EMI; it is his first album recorded for this label after departure from BMG. It was preceded by the single "Who's Hurting Who", which was the only track on the album produced by Nile Rodgers and Mark Ralph. The album debuted atop the UK Albums Chart, becoming Savoretti's second number-one album in the country.

== Commercial performance ==
Europiana debuted atop the UK Albums Chart dated 2 July 2021 with 21,000 chart sales, becoming Savoretti's second UK number-one album following his previous album, 2019's Singing to Strangers.

== Track listing ==
Europiana track listing
No.	Title	Writer(s)	Length
1.	"I Remember Us"	Jack Savoretti; Pedro Vito; Sebastian Sternberg	4:45
2.	"Secret Life"	Savoretti; Samuel Dixon	3:23
3.	"Who's Hurting Who" (featuring Nile Rodgers)	Savoretti; Mark Ralph; Nile Rodgers	3:12
4.	"When You're Lonely" (featuring John Oates)	Savoretti; Jon Green; Dixon	5:32
5.	"More Than Ever"	Savoretti	4:06
6.	"Too Much History"	Savoretti; Joel Pott	3:38
7.	"Dancing in the Living Room"	Savoretti; Green; Dixon	4:05
8.	"Each and Every Moment"	Savoretti	4:25
9.	"The Way You Said Goodbye"	Savoretti; Shannon Harris	4:16
10.	"Calling Me Back to You" (featuring Gizmo Varillas)	Savoretti; Gizmo Varillas	4:19
11.	"War of Words"	Savoretti; Harris	4:02
Total length:			45:43

Europiana Encore bonus tracks
No.	Title	Writer(s)	Length
12.	"Love of Your Life"	Savoretti; Jon Green	3:47
13.	"You Don't Have to Say You Love Me / Io che non vivo senza te (Medley)"	Pino Donaggio	3:41
14.	"Dancing Through the Rain"	Savoretti; Susannah Taylor	4:05
15.	"Mea Culpa"	Savoretti; Wayne Hector; Dixon	3:45
16.	"Why Not"	Savoretti; Pott	3:55
17.	"Late Night"	Savoretti; Pott	3:32
Total length:			69:15

== Charts ==
Chart performance for Europiana
Chart (2021)	Peak position
Italian Albums (FIMI)	46
Scottish Albums (OCC)	1
Swiss Albums (Schweizer Hitparade)	15
UK Albums (OCC)	1

== Certifications ==
Certifications for Europiana
Region	Certification	Certified units/sales
United Kingdom (BPI)	Silver	60,000^{‡}
^{‡} Sales+streaming figures based on certification alone.
