= Gizmo Varillas =

Spanish singer-songwriter

- Born: Guillermo Varillas Kortabarria; 9 January 1990 (age 36); Santander, Cantabria, Spain
- Genres: Singer-songwriter; Latin alternative; Worldbeat; Funk; Reggae; Acoustic; Folk; Soul; Rock
- Occupations: Songwriter; musician; record producer
- Instruments: Vocals, guitar, piano, charango, bass, percussion
- Years active: 2014–present
- Website: www.gizmovarillas.com

Gizmo Varillas (Spanish: [ˈɡismo βaˈɾiʎas]; born Guillermo Varillas Kortabarria on 9 January 1990) is a Spanish singer-songwriter, musician, and record producer based in Brighton, England. Raised between Spain and Wales, he is bilingual, recording and performing in both English and Spanish.

== Early life and education ==
Varillas was born in Santander, Cantabria, Spain. During his childhood he moved several times, living in Cardiff, Santander, and the Basque Country. His mother is of Basque heritage and his upbringing exposed him to both Spanish and Welsh cultures. He began learning flamenco and classical guitar at the age of ten and later formed his first ska punk band while attending school in Cardiff. After completing his education in Wales, Varillas travelled through France and northern Spain before moving to London, where he worked a variety of jobs while pursuing a music career. He initially performed with indie rock bands before embarking on a solo career.

== Career ==
=== 2014–2017: Early career and El Dorado ===
Varillas received early support from BBC Introducing London in 2015. Choosing to remain an independent artist rather than sign a traditional recording contract, he recorded in his home studio and released music under his own label, Sonteca Records.

In 2016, Varillas wrote, produced, arranged, engineered, and performed all the instruments on his debut album. During this period, he sampled John Lennon on the track "No War", having obtained permission from Yoko Ono. The dialogue was drawn from a Lennon interview broadcast on BBC Two as part of the arts programme Release on 6 June 1968.

In 2017, Varillas released his debut studio album, El Dorado, it was named one of the top ten albums of the year by Classic Pop magazine. The title track was included on the Café del Mar XXV compilation album. In 2020, Rolling Stone (German edition) selected "Give a Little Love" from the album as their number one undiscovered summer track, and named El Dorado as an ideal summer playlist.

=== 2018–2020: Dreaming of Better Days and Out of the Darkness ===
Varillas released his second studio album, Dreaming of Better Days, in 2018. Its single "Losing You" was written in response to the 2016 Orlando nightclub shooting and was chosen as song of the year by Songpickr.

In 2019, a remix of "Losing You" by Baio of Vampire Weekend was featured on the official soundtrack of the video game FIFA 19. His song "Fever, Fever" was also featured in the Netflix series Special. Later that year, Varillas partnered with Movember, donating half the proceeds from his cover of "I Put a Spell on You" - originally recorded by Screamin' Jay Hawkins - to Movember projects supporting mental health, suicide prevention, prostate cancer, and testicular cancer awareness.

In 2020, Varillas released his third studio album, Out of the Darkness. The album included the single "Saving Grace", a collaboration with Nigerian-born Afrobeat drummer Tony Allen, recorded at RAK Studios in London. The collaboration became one of Allen's final recorded appearances before his death in April 2020. The accompanying music video was premiered by The Independent, whose music correspondent Roisin O'Connor selected Varillas as her spotlight artist. In an interview with the newspaper, Varillas described "Saving Grace" as a homage to music and its role in sustaining him through difficult periods in his life.

=== 2021–2024: Collaborations and screen composing ===
In 2021, Varillas collaborated with Sergio Mendoza y la Orkesta, a member of Calexico, on the song "A La Vida". He also co-wrote "Calling Me Back to You" with Jack Savoretti, which appeared on Savoretti's album Europiana; the album debuted at number one on the UK Albums Chart. That same year, Varillas collaborated with Mexican artist Pahua on "La Cura", with the music video filmed in Los Piloncillos, Michoacán, Mexico, and Laguna Verde, Valparaíso, Chile. BBC Radio 2 presenter Craig Charles referred to Varillas on air as a "Flamenco Funkateer".

In 2022, Varillas worked with Grammy Award-winning producer and engineer Noah Georgeson on the single "A New Dawn". He also composed the score for the BBC podcast series Transfer: The Emiliano Sala Story, and its documentary companion Transfer: The Fate of Emiliano Sala, both examining the disappearance and death of Argentine footballer Emiliano Sala. Varillas' song "Freedom for a Change" was included on the soundtrack of the Netflix film I Used to Be Famous (2022).

In 2023, "Summer Rain" - a collaboration with Spanish artist Le Parody originally released in 2015 - gained international attention after becoming viral on TikTok and Instagram Reels. Varillas also co-wrote "Living Again" with Canadian singer-songwriter Bobby Bazini for Bazini's album Pearl; Atwood Magazine described the song as "cinematic and soulful".

=== 2025–present: The World in Colour ===
In 2025, Varillas released his fourth studio album, The World in Colour. Written during a period marked by the illness and death of his father, the album explores themes of grief, resilience, love, and personal transformation. It features contributions from Mexican trumpeter Alfredo Pino (known for his work with Natalia Lafourcade and Silvana Estrada), Welsh harpist Amanda Whiting, Argentine vocalist Cande Buasso, and British string player Rob Lewis.

The album received extensive coverage from BBC Radio 6 Music: during a live interview, presenter Cerys Matthews said Varillas was "about to blow" and that his song 'Desde el Otro Lado' was "massive". She later included him in her Best of 2025 compilation for the station. Fellow BBC Radio 6 Music presenters Huey Morgan and Craig Charles also praised the record, with Charles describing it as a "wonderful slice of shimmering soul". Atwood Magazine described Varillas as "a beacon of light, love, and warm, wondrous sound". He was named "Ones to Watch in 2025" by Record of the Day.

Also in 2025, Varillas collaborated with the American instrumental group City of the Sun (band) on the single "Vuela," which marked the band's first official release to feature lead vocals. He also collaborated with Polish singer Ralph Kaminski on "Still Holdin' On".

In 2026, Varillas recorded an ambient version of his song "Follow the Sun" for Café del Mar, released as a single and included on the label's compilation album Café del Mar XXXII. Café del Mar praised his "finely crafted guitar style" and "impressive musical and personal evolution".

Also in 2026, Varillas co-wrote "Tú y Yo", with French indie duo Camel Power Club, and collaborated with the Canadian band Bedouin Soundclash on "Islands in the Fog".

== Live performances ==
During the early part of his career, Varillas performed as a support act for Brazilian musician Seu Jorge, Mexican guitarists Rodrigo y Gabriela, Latin singer Natalia Lafourcade, Julieta Venegas, French singer Zaz, and Italian-British singer-songwriter Jack Savoretti across Europe.

He appeared at Montreux Jazz Festival in 2017, The Great Escape and Latitude Festival in 2018, and Zermatt Unplugged and Eurosonic Noorderslag in 2019. He was named Artist of the Month by Caffè Nero in February 2017.

In 2024, Varillas performed alongside Polish artist Paweł Domagała at the Europejski Stadion Kultury festival in Poland, and co-headlined a show with British artist Blanco White at the Stimmen festival in Lörrach, Germany.

In 2025, following the release of The World in Colour, Varillas undertook a series of sold-out dates across Europe and Turkey. A reviewer for a performance at La Maroquinerie in Paris called it "a sun-drenched sanctuary of rhythm and melody," noting that "what was special was Varillas' genuine connection with the audience. Through stories, shared singing, and rhythmic participation, the show transcended mere entertainment to become a communal celebration of music’s borderless power to unite and uplift."

These sold-out shows culminated in a headline performance with a five-piece band at the Reeperbahn Festival, which was recorded live and released as part of Reeperbahn Festival Collide Session #29. Later that year, Varillas performed at the Corona Capital festival in Mexico City, sharing the bill with Vampire Weekend, Franz Ferdinand, and Aurora.

== Personal life ==
Varillas is married to Gati Varillas, with whom he relocated from Cardiff to London and subsequently to Brighton. They have two Italian Greyhound dogs.

== Musical style and influences ==
Varillas' music combines elements of Latin music, folk, funk, soul, indie rock, flamenco, and world music. Over the years, he has collected various string instruments during his travels - most notably a Mexican Vihuela, a Portuguese Cavaquinho, an Andean Charango and an Argentinan Bichito Cordobés. He also collects Central and South American flutes and percussion instruments, frequently featuring and sampling them in his studio productions and live-streamed jam sessions on social media.

== Discography ==
=== Studio albums ===
Year	Title	Notes
2017	El Dorado	Debut studio album
2018	Dreaming of Better Days	Second studio album
2020	Out of the Darkness	Third studio album
2025	The World in Colour	Fourth studio album; dedicated to his late father
