= When You're Smiling (Bradley Walsh album) =

Studio album by Bradley Walsh and The Bradettes
- Released: 10 November 2017
- Recorded: 2017
- Genre: Traditional pop
- Length: 49:07
- Label: Sony
- Producer: Steve Sidwell

Bradley Walsh chronology
| Chasing Dreams (2016) | When You're Smiling (2017) |

The Bradettes chronology
| When You're Smiling (2017) |

When You're Smiling is the second studio album by Bradley Walsh, credited to Walsh and The Bradettes. It was released on 10 November 2017 through the record label Sony Music. The album contains mainly covers of traditional pop songs, by artists such as Frank Sinatra, Nat King Cole and Tony Bennett. One original track is featured, "You Know Best", co-written by Walsh and Steve Sidwell, who also produced the album.

== Background ==
Walsh decided to release a second album following the success of his debut album, saying "I am very flattered that so many people loved Chasing Dreams. The amazing response that we received was a big surprise to us all, and now we have to follow up that success with the second album. We have had a great time revisiting some of our favourite songs from stage and screen, and I am very proud of what we've achieved. I can only hope that people enjoy listening to it as much as we did making it."

== Track listing ==
Standard edition
| No. | Title | Length |
|---|---|---|
| 1. | "Get Happy" (featuring The Bradettes) | 3:24 |
| 2. | "The Very Thought of You" | 3:34 |
| 3. | "Who Can I Turn To?" | 3:22 |
| 4. | "Luck Be a Lady" | 3:40 |
| 5. | "When Do the Bells Ring for Me" | 2:44 |
| 6. | "When You're Smiling / All of Me" | 3:35 |
| 7. | "This Is All I Ask" | 4:56 |
| 8. | "Maybe This Time" | 3:54 |
| 9. | "I Have Dreamed" | 2:57 |
| 10. | "Come Fly with Me" | 3:23 |
| 11. | "The Good Life" | 2:17 |
| 12. | "One for My Baby" (featuring Barney Walsh) | 3:57 |
| 13. | "When You're Smiling / All of Me" (with Spoken Credits) | 4:01 |
| 14. | "You Know Best" (featuring The Bradettes) | 3:23 |
| Total length: | | 49:07 |

== Critical reception ==
When You're Smiling received mixed reviews from critics.

== Charts ==
=== Weekly charts ===
| Chart (2017) | Peak position |
|---|---|
| Scottish Albums (OCC) | 13 |
| UK Albums (OCC) | 11 |
