= Bradley Walsh =

English actor, singer and television presenter (born 1960)

- Walsh in 2012
- Born: Bradley John Walsh; 4 June 1960 (age 66); Watford, Hertfordshire, England
- Education: Francis Combe School, Hertfordshire
- Occupations: Actor, television presenter, singer
- Years active: 1988–present
- Employer(s): ITV; BBC
- Spouse: Donna Derby (m. 1997)
- Children: 2, including Barney
Association football career
Youth career
- Wormley Rovers
Senior career*
Years	Team	Apps	(Gls)
1978–1980	Brentford	0	(0)
1979–1980	Barnet (loan)	5	(0)
1980	Tring Town	?	(?)
1980–1981	Boreham Wood	?	(?)
1981–1982	Chalfont St Peter	?	(?)
- * Club domestic league appearances and goals

Bradley John Walsh (born 4 June 1960) is an English actor, television presenter, comedian, singer, and former professional footballer.

Walsh's acting roles on television include Danny Baldwin in the ITV soap opera Coronation Street (2004–2006), DS Ronnie Brooks in the procedural series Law & Order: UK (2009–2014), and Graham O'Brien in the BBC One sci-fi series Doctor Who (2018–2022). He has also presented various television game shows, including Wheel of Fortune (1997), The Chase (2009–present), Odd One In (2010–2011), Keep It in the Family (2014–2015), Cash Trapped (2016–2019), and Blankety Blank (2020–2026).

Bradley Walsh hosted the ITV variety show Tonight at the London Palladium (2016–2019) and was a team captain on the sports-themed panel show Play to the Whistle (2015–2017). He appeared as the coach in the 2001 comedy film Mike Bassett: England Manager. Since 2019, he has starred in Bradley Walsh & Son: Breaking Dad alongside his son Barney, and the two began hosting the reboot of Gladiators on BBC One in 2024. He also often appears onstage, particularly in pantomimes.

As a singer, Walsh has released the studio albums Chasing Dreams (2016) and When You're Smiling (2017), with the two respectively reaching No. 10 and 11 on the UK Albums Chart.

== Early life ==
Bradley John Walsh was born in Watford on 4 June 1960, the son of Scottish mother Margaret and English father Daniel. He grew up in Leavesden and has a sister named Kerri.

Walsh was educated at Francis Combe School (now known as Future Academies Watford), a state comprehensive school in the suburban village of Garston, in Hertfordshire, where he was voted most likely to become a TV host.

== Career ==
After leaving school, Walsh got an apprenticeship at Rolls-Royce's aircraft engine factory in Watford.

=== Football career ===
Walsh started his youth football career at Wormley Rovers. In 1979, at the age of 18, Walsh became a professional football player for Brentford, although he failed to make the first team, and was regularly a member of the reserves. While Walsh was at Brentford, he also played for Barnet on loan, making five Alliance Premier League appearances in the 1979–80 season. He also played for Tring Town, Boreham Wood and Chalfont St Peter. Ankle fractures ended his football career at the age of 22, in 1982.

He has participated in Soccer Aid, a charity football match in which England takes on The Rest of the World, with teams made up of celebrities and professional footballers. He helped England secure a victory in the inaugural 2006 event as a player and later led his team to another win as manager in 2026. He also served as a coach during the 2012 and 2016 events. Walsh also made an episode for Soccer Aid in June 2022.

=== Television career ===
Following his football career, Walsh had a variety of jobs, including working as a bluecoat at Pontins in Morecambe for three months. In October 1982, performing as a newcomer comedian, he came third in a talent contest at the Rolls-Royce Sports and Social Club in his hometown of Leavesden.

Walsh was recruited by television channel ITV, who offered him the role as presenter on one of the network's new game shows, Midas Touch. In 1997, Walsh was asked to front the British adaptation of the popular US game show Wheel of Fortune, following the decision of long-time presenter Nicky Campbell to leave the show after more than eight years.

Walsh's tenure on Wheel of Fortune lasted just one year, when he decided to turn his hand to acting. He also appeared on Lily Savage's Blankety Blank.

==== Acting ====
Walsh's first acting job was a minor role in the Channel 4 series, Lock, Stock.... He also appeared as Dave Dodds in the 2001 Channel 4 TV film Mike Bassett: England Manager. He returned to ITV in 2002 after landing a regular role in the short lived British soap opera Night and Day. He featured in a total of 52 episodes. In 2003, while appearing in Les Miserables in the West End, he played a minor role in an episode of The Bill spin-off series, M.I.T.: Murder Investigation Team.

On 31 May 2004, he made his first appearance in Coronation Street as factory boss Danny Baldwin, a nephew of the long-running character Mike Baldwin. It was originally envisaged that Walsh's character would be called Vic; however, Walsh asked for the character's name to be changed to Danny after his late father. In December 2006, Walsh was written out of Coronation Street at his own request.

In October 2007, he appeared in TV drama Torn. The following year, Walsh appeared in two episodes of Doctor Who spin-off The Sarah Jane Adventures, in the second story of series two, The Day of the Clown, as a sinister entity that fed off other people's fear. In his role, he played three parts of the same ego: a sinister American-sounding clown called Odd Bob, a mysterious European-sounding ringmaster called Elijah Spellman, and the infamous Pied Piper of Hamelin.

In January 2009, Walsh began appearing in ITV crime drama Law & Order: UK. He played the character of DS Ronnie Brooks, a recovering alcoholic who has been in the police force for more than twenty years. From 2009 until 2014, Walsh starred in a total of 53 episodes. After the eighth series, Walsh decided to take a break from the programme and ITV decided to rest the show, though it has not been cancelled, and is on a hiatus. Walsh said he would "like the opportunity to pursue other drama projects which ITV are developing".

In May 2014, Walsh was cast as Brutus in a BBC One comedy series, SunTrap, starring alongside Kayvan Novak and Keith Allen. The show premiered on 27 May 2015.

In October 2017, the BBC announced that Walsh had been cast as a companion to Jodie Whittaker as the Thirteenth Doctor, Graham O'Brien, in the eleventh series of Doctor Who. He reprised the role for the twelfth series in 2020 and departed the programme in the 2021 New Year's Day special "Revolution of the Daleks". He also appears in the 2022 special "The Power of the Doctor".

In December 2020, it was announced that Walsh had been cast as Pop Larkin in The Larkins, a new six-part adaptation of The Darling Buds of May. He started appearing on The Larkins in October 2021.

==== Presenting ====
On 9 September 2007, Walsh hosted the countdown TV's 50 Greatest Stars on ITV, in which people had to vote for their favourite television personalities. Later that year, on 29 December 2007, Walsh hosted the quiz show No. 1 Soap Fan on ITV.

In August 2008, Walsh fronted his own ITV series entitled My Little Soldier, in which young contestants are required to do "grown-up things" such as travelling on their own by train. In November and December 2008, Walsh hosted another game show for ITV, Spin Star.

In June 2009, Walsh became the presenter of ITV game show The Chase, as well as the celebrity editions of the programme. The Chase has become popular, beating rival BBC quiz show Pointless regularly. The show features contestants who take on the "Chaser" in a series of general knowledge quiz rounds. There have also been a number of series of celebrity versions of the show, also hosted by Walsh.

Walsh hosted a pilot for an American version of The Chase in 2012. However, it was decided that Brooke Burns would host the show instead.

Between 2010 and 2011, Walsh was the presenter of the Saturday panel show Odd One In, with regular panellists Peter Andre and Jason Manford.

Since 2012, Walsh has hosted the Crime Thriller Awards on ITV3. He also hosted the Crime Thriller Club on ITV3 in 2013. Walsh also narrated a one-off documentary for ITV called The Circus.

In August 2014, Walsh hosted an ITV series, Come on Down! The Game Show Story, which looked back on the history of British game shows.

On 26 October 2014, after two successful pilots, Walsh began hosting the first series of Keep It in the Family. He returned to host a second series in 2015.

In 2014, Walsh presented an episode of Sunday Night at the Palladium. He returned to the show to present another episode in 2015. In 2016, he presented eight episodes of Tonight at the London Palladium, a spin-off from the Sunday night series. A second series began airing in April 2017. On 26 December 2014, Walsh hosted an entertainment special called A Christmas Cracker, filmed at the Hammersmith Apollo in London.

In 2016, Walsh began presenting Cash Trapped, a daytime game show for ITV. A second and third series aired in 2017 and 2019, respectively.

In 2017, Walsh guest-hosted five episodes of The Nightly Show on ITV, which aired from 3 to 7 April. On 1 May 2019, it was announced that Walsh would host a new late-night talk show on ITV, titled Bradley Walsh's Late Night Guestlist. The pilot episode, featuring guests Holly Willoughby, Maya Jama and Piers Morgan, aired on 11 May 2019. A full series was not commissioned.

In 2020, Walsh was announced as the host of a one-off festive revival of the game show Blankety Blank for the BBC. The show was later commissioned for a full series, and Walsh has presented the show ever since.

In May 2023, the BBC announced that Walsh and his son Barney would be co-presenting the reboot of Gladiators. In December 2023, Walsh hosted the Royal Variety Performance at the Royal Albert Hall.

==== Other appearances ====
In 2007, Walsh took part in Northern Rock's All Star Golf Tournament on ITV, in which his team, Team Europe, won.

In August 2008, Walsh appeared in talent show Maestro on BBC Two, in which he was placed sixth.

Since 2015, Walsh has been a team captain on the sports-based panel show Play to the Whistle. Hosted by Holly Willoughby, the first series lasted for seven episodes, beginning in April 2015. The second series began in April 2016, followed by a third in 2017.

Since 2019, Walsh has starred in the ITV travel series Bradley Walsh & Son: Breaking Dad alongside his son Barney Walsh.

In May 2022, Walsh appeared on BBC Radio 4's Desert Island Discs; his chosen favourite record, book, and luxury item were "Always and Forever" by Heatwave, The Count of Monte Cristo by Alexandre Dumas, and a set of golf clubs and balls respectively.

=== Singing career ===
Walsh approached rival game show host Alexander Armstrong to ask him for singing advice in 2016. The result, in November, was Walsh's release of his debut album, Chasing Dreams, which peaked at number 10 on the UK Albums Chart. It consists of covers of jazz standards such as "That's Life" and "Mr. Bojangles" as well as the title track, an original song written by Walsh. It became the biggest-selling debut album by a British artist in 2016, selling 111,650 copies.

A year later, due to the success of Chasing Dreams, Walsh released a second album, When You're Smiling, consisting of more covers of traditional pop songs, and one original track. It reached number 11 in the charts.

== Personal life ==
Walsh married dancer Donna Derby in 1997. They have a son named Barney, with whom Walsh appeared in the travel series Bradley Walsh & Son: Breaking Dad. Walsh also has a daughter born in 1982 from a previous relationship.

Walsh lives in a barn conversion in Epping, Essex, with his family.

Walsh attends church and has described himself as "very spiritual".

== Filmography ==
=== Film ===
Year	Title	Role	Notes
2001	Mike Bassett: England Manager	Dave Dodds	
2001	The Glow	George	
2005	Coronation Street: Pantomime	Prince Charming/Danny Baldwin	Coronation Street Spin-Off film
2007	To Each His Own Cinema	Father	Segment: "Happy Ending"
2013	Imagine Africa	Himself	
2016	Mike Bassett: Interim Manager	Dave Dodds	
2016	The Lights	Mr. Elliott	Short film

=== Television ===
Year	Title	Role	Notes
1995–1996	Midas Touch	Presenter	
1997	Wheel of Fortune	Presenter	50 episodes
2000	Lock, Stock...	Larry Harmless	
2000	The Thing About Vince...	Perry	
2001	Hotel!	Henry	
2002–2003	Night and Day	Eddie "Woody" Dexter	
2003	Reps	Terry Arnold	
2003	M.I.T.: Murder Investigation Team	Phil Seagrove	
2004	The Basil Brush Show	Mr. Savage	
2004	Murder City	Ken Hill	
2004–2006	Coronation Street	Danny Baldwin	391 episodes
2006	Children's Party at the Palace	Burglar Bill	TV pantomime movie
2005, 2020	Ant & Dec's Saturday Night Takeaway	Himself	2 episodes
2007	Torn	Steven Taylor	
2007	The Old Curiosity Shop	Mr. Liggers	
2007–2008	The National Lottery Draws	Presenter	Occasional episodes
2008	The Sarah Jane Adventures	Odd Bob; Elijah Spellman; The Pied Piper	2 episodes
2008	Spin Star	Presenter	1 series
2008	Dangerous Adventures for Boys	Himself	1 episode
2009–2014	Law & Order: UK	DS Ronnie Brooks	8 series
2009–present	The Chase	Presenter	19 series (Regular); 15 series (Celebrity); 2 series (Family); Guest (Sidemen Edition) 1 series (Around The World)
2010–2011	Odd One In	Presenter	2 series
2012	The Revolting World of Stanley Brown	Headmaster	1 episode
2012–2014	The Crime Thriller Awards	Presenter	Annually
2013	Crime Thriller Club	Presenter	One-off special
2014	Come On Down! The Game Show Story	Presenter	1 series
2014	A Christmas Cracker	Presenter	One-off special
2014–2015	Sunday Night at the Palladium	Presenter	2 episodes
2014–2015	Keep It in the Family	Presenter	2 series
2015	SunTrap	Brutus	1 series
2015–2017	Play to the Whistle	Team captain	3 series
2016–2017	Tonight at the London Palladium	Presenter	2 series
2016–2019	Cash Trapped	Presenter	3 series
2016	Drunk History	Arthur Conan Doyle	1 episode
2016	The One Show	Guest presenter	1 episode
2017	The Nightly Show	Guest presenter	5 episodes
2018	The London Palladium: The Greatest Stage on Earth	Presenter	One-off special
2018	Doctor Who Access All Areas	Himself	Guest; 7 episodes
2018	When Dummies Took Over the World	Presenter	One-off special
2018–2022	Doctor Who	Graham O'Brien	Main role; 22 episodes (Series 11–12) Guest role: 1 episode (2022 Specials)
2019–present	Bradley Walsh & Son: Breaking Dad	Himself	7 series; 1 Christmas special
2019	Bradley Walsh's Late Night Guestlist	Presenter	1 episode
2019–2021	Take Off with Bradley & Holly	Presenter	1 Christmas special; 1 series
2020–present	Beat the Chasers	Presenter	7 series
2020–2026	Blankety Blank	Presenter	5 series; 50 episodes
2020	Bradley Walsh's How to Win a Gameshow	Presenter	One-off special
2021–2022	The Larkins	Pop Larkin	Main role
2022	Bradley Walsh: The Laugh's on Me	Himself	Two-part biographical series
2023	Bradley Walsh: My Comedy Heroes	Himself	Three-part series
2023	The Royal Variety Performance	Host	
2024–present	Gladiators	Presenter	TV series
2026	Bradley Walsh's Million Pound Shot	Host	Documentary and public information film
2027	Britain's Got Talent	Guest Judge	Series 20

=== Web ===
Year	Title	Role	Notes
2024	The Chase: Sidemen Edition	Himself	

== Theatre credits ==
Year	Title	Role	Location
1988	Aladdin	Wishee Washee	Theatre Royal, Norwich
1991–1992	Aladdin	Wishee Washee	Liverpool Empire Theatre
1994–1996	Peter Pan	Smee	The Alban Arena, St Albans
1996–1997	Cash on Delivery		Whitehall Theatre
1997–1998	Cinderella	Buttons	Theatre Royal, Nottingham
1998	Cinderella	Buttons	Wimbledon Theatre
1999	Run For Your Wife		Churchill Theatre
2000–2001	Dick Whittington	Dick	Orchard Theatre, Dartford
2001–2002	Snow White	Muddles	White Rock Theatre, Hastings
2002–2003	Cinderella	Buttons	The Gordon Craig Theatre, Stevenage
2003	Tom, Dick and Harry		Theatre Royal, Windsor
2003–2004	Jack & the Beanstalk		The Gordon Craig Theatre, Stevenage
2006–2007	Cinderella	Buttons	Milton Keynes Theatre
2007–2008	Aladdin	Wishee Washee	Milton Keynes Theatre
2008–2009	Aladdin	Wishee Washee	New Victoria Theatre, Woking
2010–2011	Peter Pan	Smee	Cliffs Pavilion, Southend
2013–2014	Cinderella	Buttons	Orchard Theatre, Dartford
2014–2015	Peter Pan	Smee	Milton Keynes Theatre
2015	Peter Pan: A Musical Adventure	Captain Hook	Adelphi Theatre, London (one-off concert)
2015	Cinderella – The World's Biggest Panto	Buttons	Barclaycard Arena, Birmingham
2017	Peter Pan – The World's Biggest Panto	Smee	Barclaycard Arena, Birmingham
2017	Peter Pan – The World's Biggest Panto	Smee	SSE Arena, Wembley
2023–2024	Foundation Theatres	Fire Warden	Sydney Lyric Theatre

== Discography ==
=== Studio albums ===
Title	Details	Peak chart positions	Certifications
Title	Details	UK	Certifications
Chasing Dreams	Released: 25 November 2016; Label: Sony Music; Format: CD, digital download	10	BPI: Gold
When You're Smiling	Released: 10 November 2017; Label: Sony Music; Format: CD, digital download	11	BPI: Silver

== Awards and nominations ==
Year	Award		Work	Result	Notes
2005	National Television Awards	Most Popular Actor	Coronation Street	Nominated	
2006	National Television Awards	Most Popular Actor	Coronation Street	Nominated	
2006	British Soap Awards	Best Dramatic Performance	Coronation Street	Won	
2006	British Soap Awards	Best Actor	Coronation Street	Nominated	
2006	British Soap Awards	Best Storyline	Coronation Street	Nominated	Shared with Jane Danson and Johnny Briggs
2014	National Television Awards	Radio Times – TV Detective	Law & Order: UK	Nominated	
2015	National Television Awards	Most Popular Entertainment Presenter	—N/a	Nominated	
2018	National Television Awards	Most Popular TV Presenter	—N/a	Nominated	
2019	National Television Awards	Most Popular TV Presenter	—N/a	Nominated	
2020	National Television Awards	Most Popular TV Presenter	—N/a	Nominated	
2021	British Academy Television Awards	Best Entertainment Performance	Beat the Chasers	Nominated	
2025	TRIC Awards	TV Personality	—N/a	Won	
