= Chasing Dreams =

Studio album by Bradley Walsh
- Released: 25 November 2016
- Recorded: 2016
- Genre: Traditional pop, jazz, musical theatre, swing
- Length: 46:36
- Label: Sony
- Producer: Steve Sidwell

Bradley Walsh chronology
Chasing Dreams (2016)	When You're Smiling (2017)

Chasing Dreams is the debut studio album by English singer, comedian, television presenter and actor Bradley Walsh. The album was released on 25 November 2016 through Decca Records. It peaked at number 10 on the UK Albums Chart and has been certified Gold by the British Phonographic Industry (BPI) for sales of 100,000 copies in the UK. Chasing Dreams was the biggest selling debut album by a British artist in 2016, outselling albums by the likes of Zayn Malik, Blossoms and Jack Garratt.

== Track listing ==
No.	Title	Length
1.	"Almost Like Being in Love"	1:44
2.	"That's Life"	3:06
3.	"Our Love Is Here to Stay"	2:44
4.	"Fly Me to the Moon"	3:26
5.	"Mr. Bojangles"	3:22
6.	"For Once in My Life"	3:33
7.	"Amapola"	3:27
8.	"Steppin' Out"	3:16
9.	"How Do You Keep the Music Playing?"	4:01
10.	"What Kind of Fool"	3:26
11.	"Night and Day"	3:09
12.	"Smile"	3:24
13.	"Chasing Dreams"	3:30
14.	"Chasing Dreams (Reprise)"	4:20
Total length:		46:36

== Charts and certifications ==
=== Weekly charts ===
Chart (2016)	Peak position
Scottish Albums (OCC)	13
UK Albums (OCC)	10

=== Year-end charts ===
Chart (2016)	Position
UK Albums (OCC)	57

=== Certifications ===
Region	Certification	Certified units/sales
United Kingdom (BPI)	Gold	111,650
