= Singing to Strangers =

Studio album by Jack Savoretti
- Released: 15 March 2019
- Studio: Ennio Morricone's studio, Rome
- Length: 64:18
- Label: BMG
- Producer: Cam Blackwood

Jack Savoretti chronology
Sleep No More (2016)	Singing to Strangers (2019)	Europiana (2021)

Singing to Strangers is the sixth studio album by English singer-songwriter Jack Savoretti, released on 15 March 2019 through BMG. The lead single, "Candlelight", was released in December 2018. Savoretti embarked on a European tour in support of the album. It debuted at number one on the UK Albums Chart with 32,264 units. It is Savoretti's final album for BMG.

== Background ==
Savoretti named the album Singing to Strangers because, he said, "That's my job: I sing to strangers. That's what I've spent most of my life doing. Singing to friends and family and fans; they're already onside, so you can, to some extent sing anything. Strangers need convincing, touching, connection."

== Recording ==
The album was recorded in Rome at Ennio Morricone's studio in mid-2018 with producer Cam Blackwood. In addition to writing with Kylie Minogue, Savoretti co-wrote a track with Bob Dylan titled "Touchy Situation".

== Track listing ==
No.	Title	Writer(s)	Length
1.	"Candlelight"	Jack Savoretti; Joel Laslett Pott	4:31
2.	"Love Is on the Line"	Savoretti; Davide Rossi; Pedro Vito; Sebastian Sternberg	3:30
3.	"Dying for Your Love"	Savoretti; Jake Gosling	4:02
4.	"Better Off Without Me"	Savoretti; Gosling	4:01
5.	"What More Can I Do?"	Savoretti; Rossi; Vito; Sternberg	4:57
6.	"Singing to Strangers" (interlude)	Savoretti; Rossi; Vito; Sternberg	2:53
7.	"Youth and Love"	Savoretti; Samuel Dixon; Cam Blackwood; Thomas Visser	3:55
8.	"Touchy Situation"	Savoretti; Robert Zimmerman	4:26
9.	"Greatest Mistake"	Savoretti	4:59
10.	"Things I Thought I'd Never Do"	Savoretti	4:10
11.	"Going Home"	Savoretti	4:26
Total length:			64:18

Deluxe edition bonus tracks
No.	Title	Writer(s)	Length
12.	"Symmetry"	Savoretti; Matthew Benbrook	3:29
13.	"Beginning of Us"	Savoretti; Nikolaj Torp Larsen	3:48
14.	"Music's Too Sad Without You" (with Kylie Minogue; live from Venice)	Kylie Minogue; Savoretti; Dixon	4:40
15.	"Vedrai Vedrai / Oblivion" (live from Venice)	Astor Piazzolla; Luigi Tenco	6:31

Special edition additional tracks
No.	Title	Writer(s)	Length
16.	"Waiting for the Sun"	Savoretti; Rossi; Vito; Sternberg	3:16
17.	"Closer"	Savoretti; Steve Mac	3:21
18.	"Christmas Morning"	Savoretti; Kristoffer Sonne; Larsen	2:46
19.	"Greatest Mistake" (edit)	Savoretti	3:40
20.	"Youth and Love" (featuring Mika)	Savoretti; Dixon; Blackwood; Visser	3:32
21.	"Music's Too Sad Without You" (with Kylie Minogue)	Minogue; Savoretti; Dixon	4:08
22.	"Human" (with Ward Thomas; live at the SSE Arena, Wembley)	Brandon Flowers; Dave Keuning; Mark Stoermer; Ronnie Vannucci, Jr.	4:11
23.	"Things I Thought I'd Never Do" (live at the SSE Arena, Wembley)	Savoretti	7:06
24.	"Candlelight" (Ken Bruce piano session)	Savoretti; Pott	4:30
25.	"You and Me as One" (with Sigma)	Savoretti; Joe Lenzie	3:27
Total length:			104:32

== Charts ==
=== Weekly charts ===
Chart (2019)	Peak position
Australian Albums (ARIA)	23
Belgian Albums (Ultratop Flanders)	200
Dutch Albums (Album Top 100)	99
German Albums (Offizielle Top 100)	98
Irish Albums (IRMA)	47
Italian Albums (FIMI)	19
Scottish Albums (OCC)	1
Swiss Albums (Schweizer Hitparade)	8
UK Albums (OCC)	1

=== Year-end charts ===
Chart (2019)	Position
UK Albums (OCC)	28
