= Written in Scars =

2015 studio album by Jack Savoretti

Studio album by Jack Savoretti
- Released: 9 February 2015
- Recorded: 2013–2014
- Genre: Americana; folk rock; indie pop
- Length: 38:00
- Label: BMG Chrysalis UK
- Producer: Sebastian Sternberg, Pedro Vito, Samuel Dixon, Matty Benbrook, Emre Ramazanoglu

Jack Savoretti chronology
| Before the Storm (2012) | Written in Scars (2015) | Sleep No More (2016) |

Written in Scars is the fourth studio album by English-Italian singer-songwriter Jack Savoretti. It was released on 9 February 2015 by BMG Chrysalis UK.

The album has peaked at number 7 on the UK Albums Chart and has sold 147,092 copies as of November 2016.

== Reception ==
Professional ratings
Review scores
| Source | Rating |
|---|---|
| The Independent | 4/5 stars |
| Q | 4/5 stars |

The album was critically acclaimed, with reviews including 4 stars from The Independent and 4 stars from Q. BBC Radio 2 made Written in Scars their Album of the Week on 1 February 2015, and Tesco also made it their Album of the Week on 10 April 2015.

== Track listing ==
| No. | Title | Writer(s) | Length |
|---|---|---|---|
| 1. | "Back to Me" | Jack Savoretti/Samuel Dixon | 3:18 |
| 2. | "Home" | Savoretti/Pedro Vito/Sebastian Sternberg | 3:17 |
| 3. | "Don't Mind Me" | Savoretti/Dixon | 3:27 |
| 4. | "Tie Me Down" | Savoretti/Matty Benbrook | 3:01 |
| 5. | "Broken Glass" | Savoretti/Dixon | 3:15 |
| 6. | "The Other Side of Love" | Savoretti/Dixon | 4:14 |
| 7. | "Nobody 'Cept You" | Bob Dylan | 3:13 |
| 8. | "The Hunger" | Savoretti/Vito/Sternberg | 3:38 |
| 9. | "Written in Scars" | Savoretti/Dixon | 3:57 |
| 10. | "Wasted (feat. Lissie)" | Savoretti/Benbrook | 2:57 |
| 11. | "Fight 'Til the End" | Savoretti/Vito/Sternberg | 3:34 |

=== Additional tracks ===
The online release also contained three bonus tracks:

| No. | Title | Length |
|---|---|---|
| 12. | "Home (acoustic Version)" | 3:19 |
| 13. | "The Other Side of Love (acoustic Version)" | 3:24 |
| 14. | "Written in Scars (acoustic Version)" | 4:37 |

== Written in Scars (New Edition) ==
Written in Scars (New Edition)

Studio album by Jack Savoretti
- Released: 18 September 2015
- Recorded: 2013–2015
- Genre: Acoustic, folk, rock
- Length: 73:37
- Label: BMG Rights Management (UK) Ltd

After the success of the album, Savoretti released a lengthier 20-track edition on BMG Rights Management (UK) Ltd titled Written in Scars (New Edition). The first 11 tracks were identical and in same order as appearing in the original album.

The remaining nine tracks included two brand new songs, "Back Where I Belong" and "Catapult", five live renditions of tracks appearing in the original album including the title track. The remaining two new tracks are collaborations with Alexander Brown, first in a rendition of "Jack In a Box" as a duet with him, the second the track "The Other Side of Love" with a vocal remix of Alexander Brown.

=== Track listing ===
1. "Back to Me" – 3:18
2. "Home" – 3:17
3. "Don't Mind Me" – 3:27
4. "Tie Me Down" – 3:01
5. "Broken Glass" – 3:15
6. "The Other Side of Love" – 4:14
7. "Nobody 'Cept You" – 3:13
8. "The Hunger" – 3:38
9. "Written in Scars" – 3:57
10. "Wasted" – 2:57
11. "Fight 'Til the End" – 3:34
12. "Back Where I Belong" – written by Jack Savoretti & Matt Benbrook – 4:47
13. "Catapult"- written by Jack Savoretti and Jon Green – 3:26
14. "Written in Scars" (live in Rome) – 5:05
15. "Back to Me" (live in Rome) – 3:29
16. "Fight 'Til the End (live in Rome) – 4:08
17. "Home" (live in Rome) – 3:33
18. "Broken Glass" (live in Rome) – 4:02
19. "Jack In a Box" (Alexander Brown version) – duet with Alexander Brown – written by Jack Savoretti & Matt Benbrook – 3:12
20. "The Other Side of Love" (Alexander Brown vocal remix) – 3:55

== Charts ==
=== Weekly charts ===
| Chart (2015–16) | Peak position |
|---|---|
| Australian Albums (ARIA) | 47 |
| Italian Albums (FIMI) | 67 |
| New Zealand Albums (RMNZ) | 17 |
| Swiss Albums (Schweizer Hitparade) | 11 |
| UK Albums (OCC) | 7 |

=== Year-end charts ===
| Chart (2015) | Position |
|---|---|
| UK Albums (OCC) | 81 |
| Chart (2016) | Position |
| UK Albums (OCC) | 98 |
