= Harder Than Easy =

Studio album by Jack Savoretti
- Released: 15 September 2009
- Genre: Acoustic; folk
- Label: De Angelis
- Producer: Rick Barraclough

Jack Savoretti chronology
Between the Minds (2007)	Harder Than Easy (2009)	Before the Storm (2012)

Singles from Harder Than Easy
- 1. "Map of the World" Released: 6 July 2009

Harder Than Easy is the second studio album by English singer and songwriter Jack Savoretti. It was released for digital distribution by De Angelis Records on 15 September 2009, in the United States.

== Recording ==
Harder Than Easy was recorded over seven days in Los Angeles at Jackson Browne's studio with members of Tom Waits' band (Larry Taylor and Steve Hodges) and Counting Crows (Charlie Gillingham and David Immergluck). It was mixed by Jack Joseph Puig (U2, Snow Patrol, John Mayer).

== Track listing ==
All tracks are written by Jack Savoretti, except where noted.

No.	Title	Writer(s)	Length
1.	"Map of the World"		3:56
2.	"Wonder"		4:23
3.	"Northern Sky"	Nick Drake	3:34
4.	"Lost America"		3:48
5.	"Mother"		3:21
6.	"Songs from Different Times"	Savoretti/Rick Barraclough	3:24
7.	"Russian Roulette"		4:36
8.	"Breaking News"		4:40
9.	"Harder Than Easy"		3:43
10.	"Patriot"		3:27

== Personnel ==
- Jack Savoretti – acoustic guitar

Technical

- Rick Barraclough – production
- Jack Joseph Puig – mixing
