= Sleep No More (Jack Savoretti album) =

2016 album by Jack Savoretti

Studio album by Jack Savoretti
- Released: 28 October 2016
- Genre: Americana; folk rock; indie pop
- Length: 42:36
- Label: BMG
- Producer: Mark Ralph; Samuel Dixon; Jon Green; Matty Benbrook; Cam Blackwood; Steve Robson

Jack Savoretti chronology
Written in Scars (2015)	Sleep No More (2016)	Singing to Strangers (2019)

Sleep No More is the fifth studio album released by English-Italian singer-songwriter Jack Savoretti, released on 28 October 2016. The album peaked at number 6 on the UK Albums Chart and sold 100,000 copies as of September 2017.

== Track listing ==
All tracks are written by Jack Savoretti, except where noted.

Sleep No More – Standard edition
No.	Title	Writer(s)	Producer(s)	Length
1.	"When We Were Lovers"		Mark Ralph	3:30
2.	"Deep Waters"	Savoretti; Samuel Dixon	Dixon	3:45
3.	"I'm Yours"	Savoretti; Dixon; Jon Green	Dixon; Green	3:07
4.	"Helpless"	Savoretti; Matty Benbrook	Benbrook	3:13
5.	"We Are Bound"	Savoretti; Pedro Vito; Sebastian Sternberg	Cam Blackwood	3:01
6.	"Tight Rope"		Benbrook	3:45
7.	"Troubled Souls"		Blackwood	3:30
8.	"Only You"		Blackwood	3:50
9.	"Sleep No More"	Savoretti; Benbrook	Benbrook	3:11
10.	"Any Other Way"	Savoretti; Dixon	Dixon	4:25
11.	"Start Living in the Moment"	Savoretti; Steve Robson	Robson	3:25
12.	"Lullaby Loving"	Savoretti; Dixon	Dixon	3:54
Total length:				42:36

Sleep No More – Special edition
No.	Title	Writer(s)	Producer(s)	Length
13.	"Whiskey Tango"		Blackwood	3:41
14.	"Soldier's Eyes" (live)			4:12
15.	"Breaking the Rules" (live)			5:52
16.	"Home" (live)	Savoretti; Vito; Sternberg		3:29
17.	"The Other Side of Love" (live)	Savoretti; Dixon		4:26
18.	"Tie Me Down" (live)	Savoretti; Benbrook		4:15
19.	"When We Were Lovers" (acoustic)			3:33
20.	"Deep Waters" (acoustic)	Savoretti; Dixon		3:34
21.	"Start Living in the Moment" (acoustic)	Savoretti; Robson		2:59
22.	"Only You" (acoustic)			3:43
23.	"I'm Yours" (acoustic)	Savoretti; Dixon; Green		3:04
24.	"Soldiers Eyes" (acoustic)		Blackwood	4:03
Total length:				1:21:00

== Charts ==
Chart (2016)	Peak position
Australian Albums (ARIA)	58
Italian Albums (FIMI)	15
Irish Albums (IRMA)	86
Swiss Albums (Schweizer Hitparade)	23
UK Albums (OCC)	6
