= Before the Storm (Jack Savoretti album) =

Studio album by Jack Savoretti
- Released: 4 June 2012
- Recorded: January–February 2012
- Genre: Acoustic, folk
- Length: 45:29
- Label: Fullfill Records
- Producer: The Suppliers

Jack Savoretti chronology
Harder Than Easy (2009)	Before the Storm (2012)	Written in Scars (2015)

Before the Storm is the third studio album released by singer and songwriter Jack Savoretti. It was recorded at Kensaltown Studios in London and released on 4 June 2012.

== Track listing ==
All tracks are written by Jack Savoretti, except where noted.

No.	Title	Writer(s)	Length
1.	"Not Worthy"	Savoretti/Steve Booker	3:03
2.	"Take Me Home"		3:57
3.	"Breaking the Rules"		3:36
4.	"The Proposal"		3:37
5.	"Vagabond"		3:49
6.	"Changes"		4:15
7.	"Last Call"		3:38
8.	"Come Shine a Light"		3:30
9.	"Before the Storm"		3:35
10.	"Crazy Fool"		3:31
11.	"Lifetime"	Savoretti/Julian Emery/Jim Irvin	3:11
12.	"Knock Knock"		2:59
13.	"For the Last Time"		3:12

== Reception ==
Professional ratings
Review scores
Source	Rating
The Independent	3/5 stars
Daily Express	4/5 stars
MusicMuso	5/5 stars
Female First	5/5 stars

Critical reception of the album was generally positive.

== Personnel ==
- Jack Savoretti – Vocals, acoustic guitar
- Pedro Vito – Electric guitar

=== Production ===
- The Suppliers – Producers
- Martin Terefe – Executive Producer
- Dyre Gormsen – Mixing
