= Jack Savoretti =

British-Italian singer and musician

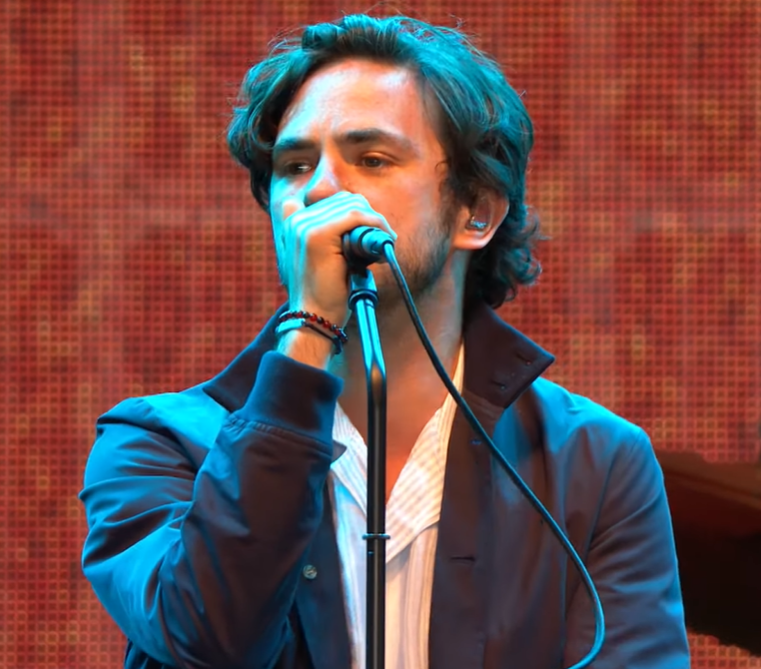
- Savoretti performing at Pinkpop in 2019

Background information
- Born: Giovanni Edgar Charles Galletto-Savoretti; 10 October 1983 (age 43); Westminster, London, England
- Genres: Folk rock; indie pop; acoustic; Americana; alternative rock
- Instruments: Acoustic guitar; electric guitar; piano; harmonica
- Years active: 2005–present
- Label: EMI
- Website: jacksavoretti.com

Giovanni Edgar Charles Galletto-Savoretti (born 10 October 1983), known professionally as Jack Savoretti, is a British acoustic singer, songwriter, and musician. He has released eight studio albums to date: Between the Minds (2007), Harder Than Easy (2009), Before the Storm (2012), Written in Scars (2015), Sleep No More (2016), Singing to Strangers (2019), Europiana (2021) and Miss Italia (2024). Singing to Strangers became his first number-one album on the UK Albums Chart.

== Early career ==
Born in Westminster to an Italian father and a mother of half Polish Jewish and half German descent, Savoretti grew up in London, before moving to Lugano, a Swiss city near the Italian border. Moving around Europe as a child, he ended up at the American School in Switzerland where he picked up an accent he describes as "transatlantic mutt".

As a teenager, he was interested only in poetry. "I was writing all the time, it was the thing to do, sit under a tree with a notebook, go somewhere else in your head. I was in the clouds." When his mother gave him a guitar and suggested he try putting some of his words to music he was "surprised how much more people listen to you when you are singing than if you read a poem". "After that, I couldn't stop, it was constant writing, every day, it became almost a form of conversation, the way I interact with the world."

He began playing guitar at 16. Savoretti did two duets with Shelly Poole called "Anyday Now" and "Hope", both of which appear on Poole's album Hard Time for the Dreamer, which was released in September 2005. Jack was signed to De-angelis Productions when he was 18 years of age and subsequently signed to De-angelis Records, a label set up by Anne Barrett and Eric Ramon. Rick Barraclough joined De-angelis in 2005 and produced the first two albums Between the Minds and Harder than Easy. The label contracted Nick Fleming's radio promotions company who introduced Savoretti to Radio 2 where his album Between The Minds became the album of the week. De-angelis then flew Savoretti out to the US where Sue Crawshaw, who was working for De-angelis publishing, set up a showcase at Fox film studios, where he performed and quickly became the darling for many film and television supervisors. During this time the label suggested to the MD of Caffè Nero Paul Ettinger (who had previously seen Jack perform at Tony Moore's venue in Hammersmith) that Jack do a tour of the cafés, becoming the first label to come up with this marketing idea. Graham Stokes who was consulting for De-angelis suggested that De-angelis should approach the new Grammy award-winner Corinne Bailey Rae's management to have Savoretti as the support act for Corinne's upcoming European tour. Further to that tour Jack also supported Gavin DeGraw on a European tour. Savoretti parted ways with De-angelis in 2010.

== Career ==
=== 2006–2008: Debut ===
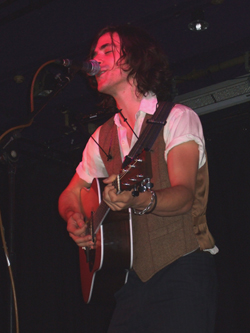
Savoretti performing in 2008.

Savoretti released his first single on 9 October 2006, called "Without". The video, filmed in Mallorca was directed by Oscar-nominated director Bobby Garabedian. The single charted at number 90 in the UK Singles Chart and was B-Listed on BBC Radio 2. His second single, "Dreamers", was less successful, reaching No. 123 in the UK Singles Chart; it was also playlisted on Radio 2. Savoretti was then spotted by Corinne Bailey Rae, who invited Savoretti to perform with her on her European tour. His album gained support on Radio 2, where it was declared Album of the Week. The album Between the Minds was released in March 2007, and it débuted at number 5 on the UK indie charts. On 6 August 2007 he made his television debut on GMTV, where he performed "Dr Frankenstein". Throughout February and March 2008, Savoretti embarked on a solo mini-tour of Caffè Nero bars in the UK.

After his Caffè Nero tour he re-released his debut album Between the Minds with a bonus disc with unplugged versions of some of his songs, three new songs, as well as a live cover version of Johnny Cash's "Ring of Fire" on 31 March 2008. Four days later, on 4 April 2008, he made another television performance, performing "Gypsy Love" on This Morning.

Savoretti joined Steve Booker (writer of Duffy's "Mercy") to write the A-side to his single, "Gypsy Love", which captures the sincerity of Savoretti's song-writing. Songs such as the A side of his single "One Man Band" are a testament to how he spent the beginning of the year, and an expression of his ability to showcase his voice without the support of a full band.

Two of his songs featured in series 5 of the hit TV series One Tree Hill. "Between the Minds" was featured in the episode "Cryin' Won't Help You Now", and "No One's Aware" was featured in the episode "What Do You Go Home To?" "No One's Aware" was also featured in the film The Sisterhood of the Traveling Pants 2, which was released in August in the US and was released in the UK in January 2009. His song "Chemical Courage" was featured on the A&E television series The Cleaner. The track "Soldier's Eyes" from Between the Minds played over the closing credits of the second episode of the fifth series of Sons of Anarchy.

Savoretti toured Europe with Gavin DeGraw after he approached Savoretti asking him to be his support act. To coincide with Savoretti supporting DeGraw, Savoretti's debut album, Between the Minds, was released on all European iTunes stores.

=== 2009–2013: Harder Than Easy and Before the Storm ===
Savoretti's second album, Harder Than Easy, was due for release on 6 July 2009. The album release was postponed and it was finally released in North America on 15 September 2009. On 14 April a new song called "Him & Her" was released through gigwise.com as a free download to launch the new album.

Savoretti wrote the track "One Day" specifically for the American film Post Grad, and a version of "One Day" is performed in the film by Zach Gilford's character. A "One Day" music video featuring Post Grad footage was released. The film was released in the USA on 21 August 2009.

On 2 November 2010, Savoretti announced via Facebook that he was in London working on his third album. He spent most of 2011 touring and working on his third album, debuting many new songs.

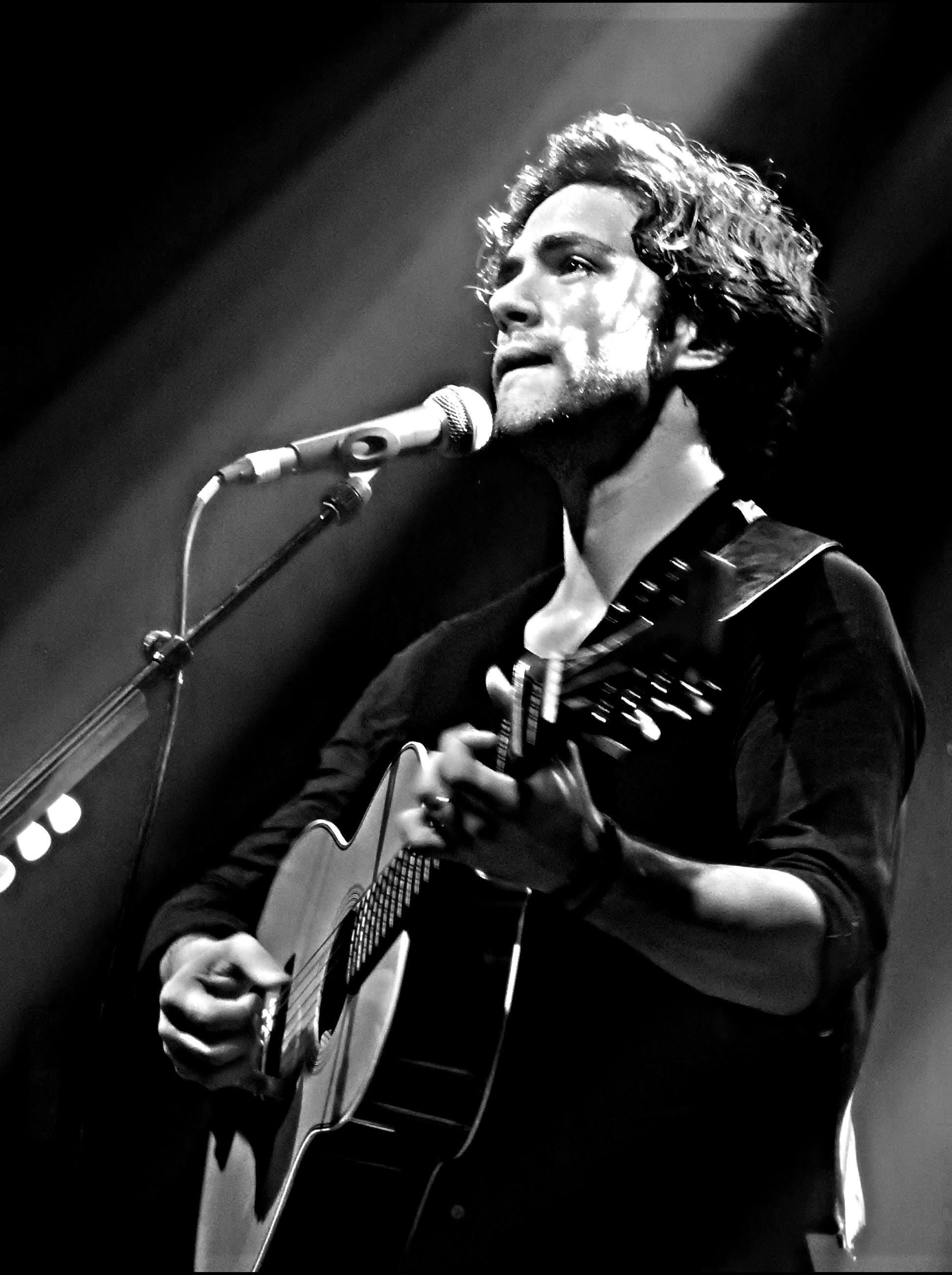
Savoretti performing in 2014.

On 2 February 2012 Savoretti released the song "Hate & Love", featuring Sienna Miller, followed by the first single, "Knock Knock", on 12 February. On 3 May Savoretti released a third single called "Take Me Home" along with a music video. A competition was set for fans to cover this song and submit to the Facebook page in order to win the chance to tour with Savoretti. The third album, Before the Storm, was released on 4 June. With his band, The Dirty Romantics, they recorded at Kensaltown Studios and mastered the LP at Abbey Road Studios. The album showed a new side to Savoretti, yet kept the same poetic charm seen in previous albums. Starting his UK leg of the tour at The Borderline, Savoretti showcased the new material whilst also appearing to have something else up his sleeve with a song called "Crazy Town". In the autumn of 2012, Jack co-wrote songs with Janet Devlin for her upcoming debut release.

=== 2014–2018: Written in Scars and Sleep No More ===
Before the Storm re-ignited Savoretti's passion for songwriting, taught him how to put himself in his songs and, crucially, led him to the musicians who helped him helm Written in Scars – his fourth album and his first to be released by a major label, BMG Chrysalis, with whom he signed in 2014. Many of the songs on the album were co-written with Samuel Dixon and Matt Benbrook. The track "Wasted" featured Lissie and a deluxe version contained three acoustic tracks.

The singles "Tie Me Down", "Home" and "The Other Side of Love" were playlisted and championed by BBC Radio 2, where Savoretti appeared as a guest on the shows of Dermot O'Leary, Chris Evans and Richard Madeley. Savoretti also appeared on BBC One's The One Show on 20 February 2015 to perform his single "Home".

The official video for "Home" was filmed during a football match at the stadium of Genoa, Jack's hometown; fortunately Genoa won.

The official video for "The Other Side of Love" premièred in March 2015, and stars the actor Rafe Spall.

Written in Scars was released on 9 February 2015 on BMG Chrysalis. The album peaked in the official UK Albums Chart at number 7, registering 41 weeks to date. BBC Radio 2 made Written in Scars their Album of the Week on 1 February 2015, and Tesco also made it their Album of the Week on 10 April 2015.

To mark the album's release, Savoretti embarked on a sold-out headline UK and Ireland tour, which took in cities including Manchester, Glasgow, Dublin and Leeds before finishing with a sold-out show at London's Shepherd's Bush Empire, which was given a four-star review by Emily Jupp of The Independent.

In 2016, Savoretti recorded a duet with Elisa, called "Waste Your Time on Me", on her album, On. He also had a sold-out show at the Hammersmith Apollo, and played at a special event in the centre of the elegant small Italian village of Portofino.

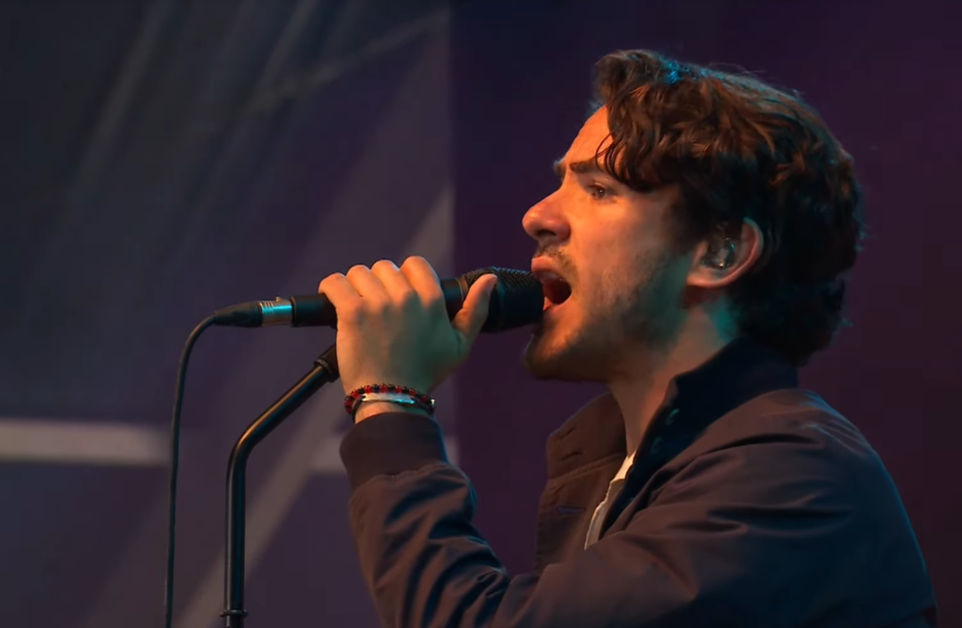
Savoretti performing in 2019

Savoretti's fifth album Sleep No More was released on 28 October 2016.

In 2018, he featured on Kylie Minogue's album Golden, where he dueted with her on the song "Music's Too Sad Without You".

=== 2019–2022: Singing to Strangers and Europiana ===
Promoted by an appearance on The Graham Norton Show, Singing to Strangers became Savoretti's first number-one album on 24 March 2019.

Europiana, Jack's seventh studio album, was released on 25 June 2021 through EMI. It was preceded by the single "Who's Hurting Who", which was the only track on the album produced by Nile Rodgers and Mark Ralph. The album debuted atop the UK Albums Chart, becoming Savoretti's second number-one album in the country.

=== 2024–present: Miss Italia and We Will Always Be the Way We Were ===
On 17 May 2024, Savoretti released his eighth studio album, Miss Italia, which was the singer's first album to consist mostly of tracks sung in Italian. The album debuted and peaked at number 43 on the UK Albums Chart. Miss Italia produced three singles: "Come Posso Raccontare", "Senza una Donna" (a collaboration with Zucchero) and "Ultime Parole", featuring Australian singer Natalie Imbruglia. On 6 June 2024, Savoretti performed "Soldier's Eyes", from his debut album Between the Minds, as part of the BBC's coverage of the eightieth anniversary of the Normandy landings. The track debuted at number 87 on the UK Singles Downloads Chart after just one day of renewed interest.

On 8 January 2026, Savoretti announced that his ninth studio album, We Will Always Be the Way We Were, would be released on 10 April 2026. He released the title single on the same day as the announcement, debuting at number 8 on the UK Singles Downloads Chart on 16 January 2026. Discussing the forthcoming studio album, he shared, "This is a full-circle album. It's going back to my roots, to the neighbourhood where I first started making music—with the same friends and musicians I met around Ladbroke Grove and Portobello Road. It’s the album I always wanted to make when I was starting out, but didn't yet have the courage or experience to make. Now I do."

== Personal life and family ==
Savoretti's grandfather led the Italian partisan movement in Genoa that fought German occupation during World War II. He was posthumously recognised by the city and a street in Genoa has been named in his memory.

A fluent Italian speaker, Savoretti is a fan of the Italian football club Genoa C.F.C., which appears in the video of the single "Home". Savoretti is married to the British actress Jemma Powell. They live in Great Tew, Oxfordshire with their three children - Connie, Winter and Celeste. Savoretti also has a house on Formentera in the Balearic Islands.

== Discography ==
=== Studio albums ===
- Between the Minds (2007)
- Harder Than Easy (2009)
- Before the Storm (2012)
- Written in Scars (2015)
- Sleep No More (2016)
- Singing to Strangers (2019)
- Europiana (2021)
- Miss Italia (2024)
- We Will Always Be the Way We Were (2026)

=== Soundtrack ===
==== Films ====
Year	Film	Song
2008	The Sisterhood of the Traveling Pants 2	"No One's Aware"
2009	Post Grad	"One Day"
2013	Universitari	"Changes"

==== TV shows ====
Year	TV show	Song
2008	One Tree Hill	"No One's Aware"
2008	One Tree Hill	"Between the Minds"
2008	One Tree Hill	"Dreamers"
2008	The Cleaner	"Chemical Courage"
2008	EastEnders	"Gypsy Love"
2009	One Tree Hill	"Wonder"
2009	Grey's Anatomy	"Songs from Different Times"
2009	One Tree Hill	"Mother"
2010	Grey's Anatomy	"Breaking News"
2010	Grey's Anatomy	"Wonder"
2011	Grey's Anatomy	"Harder Than Easy"
2011	Greek	"Ring of Fire"
2012	The Vampire Diaries	"Hate and Love"
2012	One Tree Hill	"Changes"
2012	Sons of Anarchy	"Soldier's Eyes"
2016	Teen Wolf	"Fight Til' the end"
2017	The Royals	"Deep Waters"

==== Video games ====
Year	Game	Song
2019	Days Gone	"Soldier's Eyes"

=== TV appearances ===
Year	TV show	Song
2007	Top of the Pops 2	"Dreamers"
2007	GMTV	"Dr Frankenstein"
2008	This Morning	"Gypsy Love"
2008	MDA Telethon	"Dr Frankenstein"
2012	Got to Dance	"Knock Knock"
2012	Morgan Spurlock's New Britannia	"Knock Knock"
2012	The Xtra Factor	"Lifetime"
2012	The Xtra Factor	"Take Me Home"
2012	The Xtra Factor	"For the Last Time"
2012	Freshly Squeezed	"Breaking the Rules"
2012	Sunday Brunch	"Breaking the Rules"
2013	BBC Breakfast	"Not Worthy"
2013	MOTD Kickabout	"Not Worthy"
2013	Sunday Brunch	"Not Worthy"
2014	Life's a Pitch	"Sweet Hurt", "Broken Glass"
2014	Vintage TV	"Sweet Hurt"
2015	Sunday Brunch	"Written in Scars", "Back Where I Belong"
2016	The Graham Norton Show	"Catapult"
2016	The London Palladium	"Catapult"
2017	The Graham Norton Show	"Only You"
2018	Michael McIntyre's Big Show	"Music's Too Sad Without You"
2018	Jonathan Ross	"Music's Too Sad Without You"
2019	The Graham Norton Show	"Candlelight"
2019	Soccer AM	"Candlelight"
2019	Saturday Kitchen	"Singing To Strangers"
2020	Saturday Morning with James Martin	"Singing To Strangers"
2021	Loose Women	"Who's Hurting Who"
2021	Martin & Roman's Weekend Best!	"Who's Hurting Who"
2021	The Graham Norton Show	"Who's Hurting Who"
2024	BBC D-Day 80th Anniversary	"Soldier's Eyes"
2024	The Graham Norton Show	"Bada Bing, Bada Boom" (with Miles Kane)
