= Between the Minds =

Studio album by Jack Savoretti
- Released: 5 March 2007
- Genre: Acoustic; folk
- Length: 47:12
- Label: De Angelis
- Producer: Rick Barraclough

Jack Savoretti chronology
Between the Minds (2007)	Harder Than Easy (2009)

Singles from Between The Minds
- 1. "Without" Released: 9 October 2006; 2. "Dreamers" Released: 12 February 2007; 3. "Between the Minds" Released: 7 May 2007; 4. "Dr Frankenstein" Released: 23 July 2007; 5. "Gypsy Love" / "One Man Band" Released: 31 March 2008

Professional ratings
Review scores
Source	Rating
AllMusic	3/5 stars
Q	4/5 stars

Between the Minds is the debut album by English singer and songwriter Jack Savoretti, released on 5 March 2007. It charted at number 70 in the UK Albums Chart and includes the singles "Without", "Dreamers", "Between the Minds", and "Dr Frankenstein".

On 31 March 2008, a double-CD version of the album was released in the UK, charting at number 195 in the UK Albums Chart. The second disc contains acosustic versions of some of the original album's tracks, one live track and an additional song from the double A-side single "Gypsy Love" / "One Man Band".

The song "Soldier's Eyes" was featured prominently in the TV show Sons of Anarchy as well as the video game Days Gone.

To date the album has spent a total of 6 weeks in the UK Albums Chart, selling 4,603 copies.

== Track listing ==
No.	Title	Writer(s)	Length
1.	"Dreamers"	Jack Savoretti/Steve Booker	4:43
2.	"No One's Aware"	Savoretti/Rick Barraclough	3:28
3.	"Dr. Frankenstein"	Savoretti/Boo Hewerdine/Gary Clark	3:52
4.	"Once Upon a Street"	Savoretti	3:42
5.	"Without"	Savoretti/Barraclough	4:42
6.	"Blackrain"	Savoretti/Barraclough	3:22
7.	"Apologies"	Savoretti	2:59
8.	"Between the Minds"	Savoretti/Barraclough	3:49
9.	"Soldier's Eyes"	Savoretti	3:09
10.	"Lovely Fool"	Savoretti/James Dean Hicks	3:26
11.	"Chemical Courage"	Savoretti	4:31
12.	"Killing Man"	Savoretti/Angela Kaset	5:36

=== Between the Minds: Deluxe Edition ===
Disc 1

1. "Dreamers"
2. "No One's Aware"
3. "Dr. Frankenstein"
4. "Once Upon a Street"
5. "Without"
6. "Blackrain"
7. "Apologies"
8. "Between the Minds"
9. "Soldier's Eyes"
10. "Lovely Fool"
11. "Gypsy Love"
12. "Chemical Courage"
13. "Killing Man"

Disc 2

1. "One Man Band" [acoustic]
2. "Russian Roulette" [acoustic]
3. "Without" [acoustic]
4. "Killing Man" [acoustic]
5. "Between the Minds" [acoustic]
6. "Dr. Frankenstein" [acoustic]
7. "Blackrain" [acoustic]
8. "Lucy" [acoustic]
9. "Ring of Fire" [live from Paris]

== Charts ==
Chart (2007)	Peak position
UK Albums (OCC)	70
UK Independent Albums (OCC)	5

== Release details ==
Country	Date	Label	Format	Catalog
United Kingdom	5 March 2007	De Angelis Records	CD	DAR 2 CD
United Kingdom	31 March 2008	De Angelis Records	2×CD	DAR 11 CD
