= List of television programmes broadcast by ITV =

This is a list of television programmes that are either currently being broadcast or have previously been broadcast on ITV in the United Kingdom.

== Current programming ==
=== Soap operas ===
- Coronation Street (1960–present)
- Emmerdale (1972–present)

=== Drama ===
- Midsomer Murders (1997–present)
- Grantchester (2014–present)
- Unforgotten (2015–present)
- The Bay (2019–present)
- Grace (2021–present)
- Trigger Point (2022–present)
- Karen Pirie (2022–present)
- Red Eye (2024–present)
- After the Flood (2024–present)

=== Comedy ===
- It'll Be Alright on the Night (1977–present)
- Sorry, I Didn't Know (2016–present)
- Changing Ends (2024–present)
- G'wed (2024–present)
- Piglets (2024–present)

=== Reality and talent shows ===
- I'm a Celebrity... Get Me Out of Here! (2002–present)
- Britain's Got Talent (2007–present)
- Dinner Date (2010–present)
- The Voice (2017–present)
- The Masked Singer (2020–present)
- Cooking with the Stars (2021–present)
- My Mum, Your Dad (2023–present)
- Big Brother (2023–present)
- Celebrity Big Brother (2024–present)

=== Game shows ===
- Family Fortunes (1980–2002; 2020–present)
- Catchphrase (1986–2002; 2013–present)
- Lingo (1988; 2021–present)
- Jeopardy! (1990–1993; 2024–present)
- Who Wants to Be a Millionaire? (1998–2014; 2018–present)
- The Chase (2009–present)
- Tipping Point (2012–present)
- Tenable (2016–present)
- In for a Penny (2019–present)
- Beat the Chasers (2020–present)
- Limitless Win (2022–present)
- The 1% Club (2022–present)
- Riddiculous (2022–present)
- Deal or No Deal (2023–present)
- Wheel of Fortune (1988–2001; 2024–present)

=== Chat shows ===
- The Jonathan Ross Show (2011–present)

=== Award shows ===
- Brit Awards (1993–present)
- National Television Awards (1995–present)
- Academy Awards (2024–present)

=== News and current affairs ===
- ITV News at Ten (1967–1999; 2001–2004; 2008–present)
- ITV Evening News (1955–present; 1999–present at 18:30)
- ITV Weekend News (1955–present)
- ITV Lunchtime News (1972–present)
- Tonight (1999–present)
- Exposure (2011–present)
- The Martin Lewis Money Show (2012–present)
- Good Morning Britain (2014–present)
- Peston (2018–present)

=== Factual and lifestyle ===
- Long Lost Family (2011–present)
- Love Your Garden (2011–present)
- James Martin's Saturday Morning (2017–present)
- Gordon, Gino and Fred: Road Trip (2018–present)

=== Daytime magazine and talk shows ===
- Lorraine (2010–present)
- This Morning (1988–present)
- Loose Women (1999–present)

=== Specials ===
- Royal Variety Performance (1960–present)
- An Audience with... (1980–present)
- The Big Quiz (2011–present)
- The Real Full Monty (2017–present)
- Britain Get Singing (2022–present)
- Summertime Ball (2023–present)
- Jingle Bell Ball (2023–present)

=== Overnight programming ===
- Unwind with ITV (2021–present)

== Former programmes ==
=== 0–9 ===
- 1000 Heartbeats (2015–16)
- The 10 Percenters (1994–1996)
- 2DTV (2001–2004)
- The 21st Question (2014)
- 24 Hour Quiz (2004)
- 24 Hours with... (2007)
- 3@Three (2010)
- 3-2-1 (1978–1988)
- 5 Gold Rings (2017–2020)
- 500 Questions (2016)
- 60 Minute Makeover (2004–14)
- The $64,000 Question (1956–1958, 1990–1993)
- 71 Degrees North (2010–11)

=== A ===
- All Star Mr & Mrs (2008–2016)
- All Star Family Fortunes (2006–2015)
- Alphabetical (2016–2017)
- Above Suspicion (2009–2012)
- Across a Crowded Room (1978)
- The Adventurer (1972–1973)
- The Adventures of Ellery Queen (1955–1956)
- The Adventures of the Scarlet Pimpernel (1956)
- The Adventures of Sherlock Holmes (1984–1994)
- The Adventures of Sir Lancelot (1956–1957)
- The Adventures of Twizzle (1957–1959)
- The Adventures of William Tell (1958–1959)
- AEW Dynamite (2019–2024)
- AEW Rampage (2022–2024)
- After the Flood (2024–present)
- Agatha Christie's Marple (2004–2013)
- Agatha Christie's Poirot (1989–2013)
- American Dad! (from Fox, 2016–present)
- Alan Carr's Epic Gameshow (2020–present)
- The Alan Titchmarsh Show (2007–2014)
- Ambulance (1993–2001)
- Anne (2022)
- Ant & Dec's DNA Journey (2019)
- Aubrey (children's animated series) (1983)
- Ant & Dec's Limitless Win (2022–present)
- Ant & Dec's Push the Button (2010–2011)
- Ant & Dec's Saturday Night Takeaway (2002–2009, 2013–2018, 2020–2024)
- Auf Wiedersehen, Pet (ITV 1983–1986, BBC One 2002–2004)
- The Avengers (1961–1969)

=== B ===
- BBQ Champ (2015)
- Babushka (2017)
- Bad Girls (ITV 1999–2006; repeated on ITV2 & ITV3 from (2010–2014))
- Bad Move (ITV 2017)
- Bancroft (2017–2020)
- Band of Gold (1995–1997)
- Barbara (1995–2003, still repeated on ITV3)
- Barney & Friends (from PBS, 1992–2010)
- The Baron (1966–1967)
- The Beachcomber (1962)
- Beadle's About (1986–1996)
- Bordertown (2016)
- Beat the Chasers (2020–present)
- Benidorm (2007–2018)
- The Benny Hill Show (BBC TV/ BBC One 1955–1968, ITV/Thames 1969–1989)
- Big Brother (Channel 4 2000–2010, Channel 5 2011–2018, ITV2/ITV1 2023–present)
- Bigheads (2017)
- The Big Match (1968–1992, ITV4 2008–present as The Big Match Revisited)
- The Bill (1983, 1984–2010, repeated on Drama)
- Birds of a Feather (BBC One 1989–1998, ITV 2014–2020)
- A Bit of a Do (1989)
- Black Work (2015)
- Blankety Blank (BBC One 1979–1990 & 1997–1999, ITV 2001–2003)
- The Bletchley Circle (2012–2014)
- Billy Connolly: Journey to the Edge of the World (2009)
- Blind Date (1985–2003, Channel 5 2017–2019)
- Blockbusters (ITV 1983–1993, Sky One 1994, BBC 1997, Challenge 2012)
- Blues and Twos (1993–1998)
- Bonkers (2007)
- Boohbah (2003–2006)
- Born to Shine (2011)
- Brief Encounters (2016)
- Brideshead Revisited (1981)
- Britain's Best Dish (2007–2011)
- Britain's Brainiest Kid (2001–2002)
- Britain's Brightest Celebrity Family (2020)
- Britain's Brightest Family (2018–present)
- Britain's Got More Talent (2007–2019)
- Britain's Got Talent (2007–2020, 2022–present)
- Britain's Got Talent: The Champions (2019)
- Britannia High (2008)
- Broadchurch (2013–2017)
- The Buccaneers (1956–1957)
- Bullseye (1981–1995, revived on Challenge 2006, later revived for Gameshow Marathon 2005–2007 and Alan Carr's Epic Gameshow 2020)

=== C ===
- Cannonball (1958–1959)
- Cannonball (2017)
- Capstick's Law (1989)
- Captain Planet and the Planeteers (shown on CITV)
- Captain Scarlet and the Mysterons (1967–1968, later repeated on BBC Two 1993–2008)
- Captain Star (1997–1998)
- Case Closed (Funimation Version on CITV 2005–2012)
- Cash Cab UK (2005–2006)
- Cash Trapped (2016–2019)
- Catchphrase (1986–2002, 2013–present)
- Celebrity (2000)
- Celebrity Juice (ITV2 2008–2022)
- Celebrity Squares (1975–1979, 1993–1997, 2014–15)
- Chain Letters (1987–1997)
- Challenge Anneka (BBC One 1987–1995, ITV 2006–2007)
- The Champions (1968–1969)
- The Chase (2009–present)
- The Chase: Celebrity Special (2011–present)
- Cilla (2014)
- CITV (the block in ITV Breakfast; CITV got its own channel.) (CITV Weekday Block on ITV: 1983–2007, Weekend CITV 1983–2026, CITV Channel 2006–2023)
- Cleaning Up (2019)
- The Cleveland Show (from Fox, 2016–present)
- Colonel March of Scotland Yard (1956–1957)
- The Colour of Money (2009)
- Coming Home (1998)
- Coronation Street (1960–present)
- The Count of Monte Cristo (1956)
- A Country Practice (various ITV regions between 1982 and 1999)
- Countrywise (2009–present)
- Court Martial (1966)
- Cracker (1993–1996 & 2006)
- The Cook Report (1987–2000)
- The Crezz (1976)
- Crossroads (1964–1988 & 2001–2003)
- The Cube (2009–2015, 2020–present & revived as The Million Pound Cube in 2020)
- Culinary Genius (2017)
- Curry and Chips (1969)

=== D ===
- Dance Dance Dance (2017)
- The Dance Years (2001)
- Dancing on Ice (2006–2014, 2018–2025)
- Dancing on Ice at Christmas (2019)
- Danger Man (1960–1968)
- Danger Mouse (ITV 1981–1992, BBC Two 2007–2009, CBBC 2015–present)
- Danger UXB (1979)
- Dark Heart (2018)
- The Darling Buds of May (1991–1993)
- Dave Spud: the Movie (2022 as a movie)
- Davina & Shania: We love Monaco
- Daybreak (1983, 2010–2014)
- Deal or No Deal (Channel 4 2005–2016, ITV1 2023–present)
- Deep Water (2019)
- Demons (2009)
- Denver, the Last Dinosaur (shown on CITV) (1989–1994)
- Department S (1969–1970)
- The Des O'Connor Show (1963–1973)
- Des O'Connor Tonight (BBC Two 1977–1982, ITV 1983–1999 & 2001–2002)
- DI Ray (2022–2024)
- Dickinson's Real Deal (2006–2023)
- Dinosaur Britain (2015)
- Doc Martin (2004–2022, still repeated on ITV3)
- Doctor Finlay (1993–1996)
- Don't Ask Me Ask Britain (2017)
- Don't Drink the Water (1974–1975)
- Downton Abbey (2010–2015)
- Duel (2008)
- The Durrells (2016–2019)
- Duty Free (1984–1986, repeated on ITV3)

=== E ===
- Echo Beach (2008)
- Edward & Mrs. Simpson (1978)
- Eleventh Hour (2006)
- Emergency – Ward 10 (1957–1967)
- Emmerdale (originated from ITV Yorkshire) (1972–present)
- Endeavour (2012–2023)
- IBA Engineering Announcements (moved to Channel 4)
- Espionage (1963–1964)
- Eternal Law (2012)
- Everybody's Equal (1989–1991)
- Executive Stress (1986–1988)
- The Exit List (2012)

=== F ===
- The Family Chase (2017–present)
- Family Fortunes (1980–2002, 2020–)
- Family Guy (from Fox, 2016–present)
- The Famous Five (1978–1979)
- Ffizz (1987–1989)
- Fierce (2016)
- Finding Alice (2021)
- Fireball XL5 (1962–1985)
- Flockstars (2015)
- Food Glorious Food (2013)
- Footballers' Wives (2002–2006)
- Freeze Out (2015)
- The Forsyte Saga (2002)
- Four Feather Falls (1960)
- The Four Just Men (1959–1960)
- Foyle's War (2002–2015)
- Fraggle Rock (British version, 1984–1990)
- From a Bird's Eye View (1970–1971)

=== G ===
- The Gaffer (1981–1983)
- Game for a Laugh (ITV 1981–1985)
- Game of Talents (2021)
- The Gay Cavalier (1957)
- The Geisses (Die Geissens – Eine schrecklich glamouröse Familie, 2012–2024)
- General Hospital (1972–1979)
- George and Mildred (1976–1979)
- Geronimo Stilton (2009–2017)
- Get a Grip (2007)
- Get Lost! (1981)
- Get Real (1998)
- Ghost Squad (1961–1964)
- Gideon's Way (1965–1966)
- Give Us A Clue (ITV 1979–1992, BBC One 1997)
- Gladiators (ITV 1992–2000, Sky One 2008–2009)
- Glitterball (2007)
- Golden Balls (2007–2009)
- The Goldbergs (from ABC, 2014–2026)
- The Golden Shot (1967–1975, later revived for Gameshow Marathon 2005–2007)
- Gone (2026)
- Good Morning Britain (ITV 1984–1993, 2014–present)
- Good Morning Britain With Lorraine (2020)
- The Goodies (BBC Two 1970–1980, ITV 1981–1982)
- The Good Karma Hospital (2017–present)
- Gordon, Gino and Fred: Road Trip (2019–present)
- Grimefighters (2009–2012)
- The Grimleys (1999–2001)
- Grundy's Northern Pride (2007–2008)

=== H ===
- The Halcyon (2017)
- Harry Hill's TV Burp (2002–2012)
- Harry Hill's Alien Fun Capsule (2017–2019)
- Heartbeat (1992–2010, still repeated on ITV3)
- Heathrow: Britain's Busiest Airport (2015–present)
- Hell's Kitchen (2004–2009)
- Holding (2022)
- Hollington Drive (2021)
- Home and Away (ITV 1989–2000, Channel 5 2001–present)
- Homefront (2012)
- The Hot Desk (2007–2017) ITV2
- Hot Metal (1986–1989)
- Hot Money (2001)
- House Gift (2009–2011)
- House Guest (2008)

=== I ===
- I Fought the Law (2025)
- I'm a Celebrity: Extra Camp (ITV2 2002–2019)
- I'm a Celebrity...Get Me Out of Here! (ITV & ITV2 2002–present)
- In for a Christmas Penny (2019–2024)
- In for a Penny (2019–2024)
- In Plain Sight (2016)
- The Informer (1966–1967)
- Interceptor (1989–1990)
- Interpol Calling (1959–1960)
- It'll Be Alright on the Night (1977–present)
- The Invisible Man (1958)
- ITV News (1955–present)
- ITV Nightscreen (1998–2021)
- ITV Sport (ITV 1965–present, ITV4 2005–present)
- ITV Telethons (ITV 1988–1992)
- ITV Television Playhouse (1955-1967)
- Ivanhoe (ITV 1958–1959)

=== J ===
- Jackpot247 (2011–2019)
- James Bond Jr. (1991)
- Jason King (1971–1972)
- Jeopardy! (Channel 4 1983–1984, ITV 1990–1993, Sky One 1995–1996, ITV1 2023)
- Jeeves and Wooster (1990–1993)
- The Jeremy Kyle Show (2005–2019)
- Japandemonium (2018)
- Jericho (2005)
- Jericho (2016)
- Jesus of Nazareth (1977)
- The Jewel in the Crown (1984)
- The Job Lot (ITV 2013, ITV2 2014–2015)
- Joe 90 (1968–1969, repeated on BBC One 1994)
- Joan (2024)
- Jonathan Dimbleby (1994–2005)
- The Jonathan Ross Show (2011–present)
- Judge Rinder (2014–2020)
- The Julie Andrews Hour (1972–1973)

=== K ===
- Kate (1970-1972)
- Kate & Koji (2020–2022)
- Keith Lemon's Lemonaid (2012)
- Keith Lemon's Very Brilliant World Tour (2008)
- Keynotes (1989–1992)
- Kirby: Right Back at Ya! (2003–2008)
- Kinvig (1981)
- The Kit Curran Radio Show (1984–1986)
- Knock on Any Door (1965-1966)
- The Krypton Factor (1977–1995 & 2009–2010)

=== L ===
- The Labours of Erica (1989–1990)
- Ladette to Lady (2005–2010)
- Langley Bottom (1986–1987)
- Lavender Castle (1999–2000)
- Lemon La Vida Loca (2012–2013)
- Let's Do Lunch with Gino & Mel (2011–2014)
- Lewis (2006–2015)
- Liar (2017–2020)
- Little Big Shots (2017–2018)
- Little Boy Blue (2017)
- Lizzie the Lizard (1989–1991)
- London Bridge (1996–1999, only available in London region)
- London's Burning (1986–2002)
- Long Lost Family (2011–present)
- Loose Women (1999–present)
- Lorraine (2010–present, from 1987 to 1992 & 1993–2010; Lorraine Kelly worked for TVAM & GMTV on a number of shows)
- Lost in Austen (2008)
- Love Island (2005–2006)
- Love Island (2015–present)
- Lucan (2013)
- Lucky Ladders (1988–1993)

=== M ===
- Madeline (1991)
- Magic Numbers (2010)
- Malpractice (2023–2025)
- Man in a Suitcase (1967–1968)
- Man of the World (1962–1963)
- Marcella (2016–2020)
- The Masked Dancer (2021–2022 )
- The Masked Singer (2020–present)
- Maternal (2023)
- May The Best House Win (2010–2013)
- Men Behaving Badly (ITV 1991–1992, BBC 1993–1998)
- Midsomer Murders (1997–present)
- Minder (1979–1994, Channel 5 2009)
- Moneyball (2021)
- Monkey Trousers (2005)
- Monroe (2011–2012)
- Morecambe & Wise (ATV 1961–1968, BBC 1968–1977, Thames/ITV 1978–1983)
- Motormouth (1988–1992)
- The Moment of Truth (1998–2001)
- The Movie Show on ITV2 (2011)
- Mr. Bean (1990–1995; Thames 1990–1993, Central 1993–1995)
- Mr Selfridge (2013–2016)
- Mrs Biggs (2012)
- Munch Bunch
- The Muppet Show (1976–1981)
- Murder, She Wrote (originally shown on ITV, repeated on BBC, ITV 2011–present)

=== N ===
- Name That Tune (ITV 1976–1988, Channel 5 1997–1998, revived for Alan Carr's Epic Gameshow 2021)
- Nearest and Dearest (1968–1973)
- Network First (1994–1997)
- Never the Twain (1981–1991)
- The New Avengers (1976–1977)
- New Captain Scarlet (ITV & CITV 2005)
- New Faces (1973–1978 & 1986–1988)
- New Look (1958–1959)
- The New Statesman
- News Knight with Sir Trevor McDonald (2007)
- Newzoids (2015–2016)
- The Next Great Magician (2016)
- Next Level Chef UK (2023)
- Ninja Warrior UK (2015–2019, 2022)
- The Nightly Show (2017)
- Night Shift (1992–1998)
- Nightwatch with Steve Scott (2008–2010)
- No Heroics (2008)
- No Return (2022)
- The Noise (1996)
- Northanger Abbey (2007)
- Not with a Bang (1990)

=== O ===
- O.S.S. (1957–1958)
- Odd Man Out (1977)
- Odd One In (2010–2011)
- Oh, Mr. Toad (1990)
- Oliver Twist (1999)
- On the Buses (1969–1973)
- The Only Way Is Essex (ITV2 2010–2014, ITVBe 2014–present)
- Only When I Laugh (1979–1982)
- Opportunity Knocks (ITV 1956–1978, BBC One 1987–1990)
- Orson Welles' Great Mysteries (1973–1974)
- Out of Step (1957)
- Out There (2025)
- Oggy and the Cockroaches (shown on CITV) (1999–2001)

=== P ===
- P.O.W (2003)
- The Palace (2008)
- The Paper Lads (1977–1979)
- Parkinson (BBC One 1971–1982 & 1998–2004, ITV 2004–2007)
- Pan Am (TV series) (BBC Two 2011)
- The Passions of Girls Aloud (2008)
- Password (1963–1983)
- Paul O'Grady: Animal Orphans (2014–2016)
- Paul O'Grady: For the Love of Dogs (2012–present)
- Paul O'Grady: For the Love of Dogs at Christmas (2012–present)
- Paul O'Grady: For the Love of Dogs - India (2018)
- Paul O'Grady Live (2010–2011)
- Paul O'Grady's Saturday Night Line-up (2021)
- The Paul O'Grady Show (ITV 2004–2006 & 2013–2015, Channel 4 2006–2009)
- Payback (2023)
- Penn & Teller: Fool Us (2011)
- The Pembrokeshire Murders (2021)
- The People Versus (2000–2001)
- The Persuaders! (1971–1972)
- Peter Andre: The Next Chapter (2009–2013)
- Pepper Ann (from ABC, 1998–2001)
- Piece of Cake (TV series) (1988)
- Piers Morgan's Life Stories (2009–present)
- The Piglet Files (1990–1992)
- The Planet's Funniest Animals (ITV & ITV2 1999–2008)
- Play to the Whistle (2015–2017)
- Play with Me Sesame (2002–2007)
- Play Your Cards Right (1980–1987, 1994–1999 & 2001–2003, revived for Alan Carr's Epic Gameshow 2020)
- Playhouse (1967-1982)
- Please Sir! (1968–1972)
- Potatoes and Dragons (2004–2006)
- Police Camera Action! (ITV & ITV4 1994–2010)
- Pop Idol ITV & ITV2 (2001–2003)
- Popstar to Operastar (2010–2011)
- Prehistoric Park (2006)
- Press Gang (1989–1993)
- Prey (2014–2015)
- The Price Is Right (ITV 1984–1988, 1995–2001 & 2006–2007, Sky One 1989–1991, revived for Alan Carr's Epic Gameshow 2020)
- Primeval (2007–2011, Watch 2011)
- Prisoner: Cell Block H (on various ITV regions between 1984 and 1999; later on Channel 5 from 1997 to 2001)
- The Prisoner (1967–1968, remake 2009)
- The Professionals (1977–1983)
- The Protectors (1972–1974)

=== Q ===
- Quatermass (1979)
- Quantum Leap (from NBC, 2004–2008)
- Quayside (1997)
- Queenie's Castle (1970–1972)
- Quiet as a Nun (1978)
- Quincy, M.E. (from NBC, 2003–2009)
- Quiz (2020)
- Quizmania (2005–2007)
- Quizmaster (2019)

=== R ===
- Rainbow (1972–1991, 1994–1996)
- Randall and Hopkirk (Deceased) (1969–1970, revived on BBC One with Vic Reeves & Bob Mortimer 2000–2001)
- Real Prison Breaks
- Red Heat
- Red or Black? (2011–2012)
- Return of the Saint (1978–1979)
- Richard Bacon's Beer & Pizza Club (ITV4 2010–2011)
- Riddiculous (2022–present)
- Rising Damp (1974–1978, repeated on ITV3)
- The Rivals of Sherlock Holmes (1971-1973)
- Robin of Sherwood (1984–1986)
- The Rockford Files (from NBC; BBC One 1970–1997, 2000–2006 ITV, 1997–2000 Granada Plus, 2002–2004 BBC Two, 2000–2006 ITV, 2006–2010 repeated on ITV3)
- Rolling In It (2020)
- Room Service (1979)
- The Royal (2003–2011, still repeated on ITV3)
- The Ruffy-Tuff Show (2015–present; spinoff version of Saturday Night Takeaway)
- Russian Roulette (2002–2003)
- The Rubbish World of Dave Spud (2019 - 2023 CITV; last aired show before replaced by ITVX) (2023 - 2024 ITV2; ITVX programming block)

=== S ===
- Safe House (2015–2017)
- The Saint (1962–1969)
- Saint & Greavsie (1985–1992)
- Samurai Pizza Cats
- Sale of the Century (ITV 1971–1983, Sky One 1989–1991, Challenge 1997–1998)
- Sapphire & Steel (1979–1982)
- Scott & Bailey (2011–2016)
- Seaway (1965–1966)
- The Second Coming (2003) Show Me What You've Got 2008
- The Secret Service (1969)
- The Sentimental Agent (1963)
- Sexton Blake (1967–1971)
- Shillingbury Tales (1980–1981)
- Shine on Harvey Moon (1982–1995)
- Shirley's World (1972)
- Shortland Street (1993–2003)
- Show Me The Funny (2011)
- Show Me What You've Got (2006)
- Sing If You Can (2011)
- Sir Francis Drake (1961–1962)
- Sitting On A Fortune (2021)
- Small Fortune (2019)
- Soapstars (2001)
- Soapstar Superstar (2006–2007)
- Sons and Daughters (on various ITV regions between 1983 and 1995; UK Gold: 1992 to 1996; Channel 5: 1998 to 2005)
- South by South East (1991)
- Space: 1999 (1975–1977)
- Space Patrol (1963–1964)
- Space Precinct (BBC Two 1995–2003, ITV 2004–2010)
- Spin Star (2008)
- Spitting Image (1984–1996)
- Splash! (2013–2014)
- SpongeBob SquarePants (from Nickelodeon, shown on CITV)
- Squeak! (2003–2008; shown on CITV)
- Stars In Their Eyes (1990–2006, 2015)
- Starstruck (2022–2023)
- Star Wars films (1977–2005, 2015–present)
- Stay Lucky (1989–1993)
- Staying Alive (1996–1997)
- Stepping Out (2013)
- Sticks and Stones (2019)
- Stingray (1964–1965, repeated on BBC Two 1990s–2000s)
- Strange Report (1969–1970)
- Strangers (2018)
- Strike It Lucky (1986–1994, revived for Alan Carr's Epic Gameshow 2020)
- Strike It Rich (1996–1999)
- The Super Mario Bros Super Show! (TV-am & GMTV)
- Supercar (1961–1962)
- Supermarket Sweep (ITV 1993–2001, 2007 & 2020, ITV2 2019)
- Surprise Surprise (1984–2001, 2012–2015)
- Survivor (2001–2002)
- The Suspect (2022)
- The Sweeney (1975–1978)
- Sword of Freedom (1958–1961)

=== T ===
- A Tale of Two Toads (1989)
- Tales from the Crypt (from HBO)
- Take Me Out (2010–2019)
- Take the High Road (1980–2003)
- Take Your Pick (1955–1968 & 1992–1998, revived for Alan Carr's Epic Gameshow 2020)
- Tales of the Unexpected (1979–1988)
- Talking Telephone Numbers (1994–1997)
- Tell Me Everything (2022)
- Tenable (2016–present)
- Tenable All Stars (2019–present)
- Terrahawks (1983–1986)
- Thank God You're Here (2008)
- That Sunday Night Show (2010–2011)
- That's Love (1988–1992)
- The Thief, His Wife and the Canoe (2022)
- This Is Tom Jones (1969–1971)
- This Morning (1988–present)
- Thomas the Tank Engine (1984–1994, 2002–2006)
- Through the Keyhole (ITV 1987–1995 & 2013–present, Sky One 1996, BBC 1997–2008)
- Thunderbirds (ITV 1965–1966, BBC Two 1991–2009, 2014–present)
- The Tomorrow People (1973–1979, revival 1992–1995)
- Tipping Point (2012–present)
- Tonight (1999–present)
- Too Close (2021)
- Torchy the Battery Boy (1960–1961)
- Total Emergency (2009)
- A Touch of Frost (1992–2010, still repeated on ITV & ITV3)
- The Tower (2021–24)
- Trauma (2018)
- Tripper's Day (1984)
- Trisha (ITV 1999–2004, Channel 5 2005–2009)
- The Two of Us (1986–1990)
- The Witches and the Grinnygog (1983)

=== U ===
- UFO (1970–1971)
- Ultimate Force (2002–2008, repeated on ITV4 & CBS Action)
- Unforgotten (2015–present)
- University Challenge (ITV 1962–1987, BBC Two 1994–present)
- Until I Kill You (2024)
- Up the Elephant and Round the Castle (ITV 1983–1985)
- Upstairs, Downstairs (ITV 1971–1975; remake, BBC One 2010–2012)

=== V ===
- Van der Valk (1972–1977 & 1991–1992)
- Van der Valk (2020–present)
- Vanity Fair (2018)
- The Vault (2002–2004)
- Vera (2011–2025)
- The Vice (1999–2003)
- Vicious (2013–2016)
- Victoria (2016–present)
- A Village Affair (1995)
- Vincent (2005–2006)
- Vital Signs (2006)
- The Voice UK (BBC One 2012–2016; 2017–present)
- The Voice Kids (2017–2023)
- The Void (2021)

=== W ===
- Walk The Line (2021)
- The Walk-In (2022)
- Warren United (ITV4 2014)
- Watching (1987–1993)
- The Wheels on the Bus (2006)
- Whiplash (1960–1961)
- Whitechapel (2009–2013)
- White House Farm (2020)
- Who Dares, Sings! (2008)
- Who Killed Lamb? (1974)
- Who Wants to Be a Millionaire? (1998–2014, 2018–present)
- The Whole 19 Yards (2010)
- Whoops Apocalypse (1982)
- Wild at Heart (2006–2012)
- Will Shakespeare (1978)
- Win, Lose or Draw (1990–2004)
- Without Motive (2000–2001)
- Without Sin (2022)
- The Wombles (1973–1975, 1977–2002, 2013–present BBC Two, 1974–2009, 2013–present ITV, 1982–2004, 2013–present Channel 4)
- World in Action (1963–2000)
- Wycliffe (1994–1998)

=== X ===
- The X Factor (ITV & ITV2 2004–2018)
- The X Factor: Celebrity (2019)
- The X Factor: The Band (2019)
- The XYY Man (1976)

=== Y ===
- Yakari (1960–1970)
- Yanks Go Home (1976–1977)
- Yellowthread Street (1990)
- You Bet! (1988–1997, 2024-2025)
- You Don't Know You're Born (2007)
- Young Sherlock: The Mystery of the Manor House (1982)
- You're Only Young Twice (1977–1981)
- Your Face Sounds Familiar (2013)
- You've Been Framed! (1990–2022)
- Yus, My Dear (1976)

=== Z ===
- The Zodiac Game (1984–1986)
- Zoe Ball on... (2018)
- The Zone (2012–2015)
- Zone of Champions (2019)
- The Zoo Gang (1974)
- Zoo Vet at Large (1965)
