= Carl Plate =

Australian painter (1909–1977)

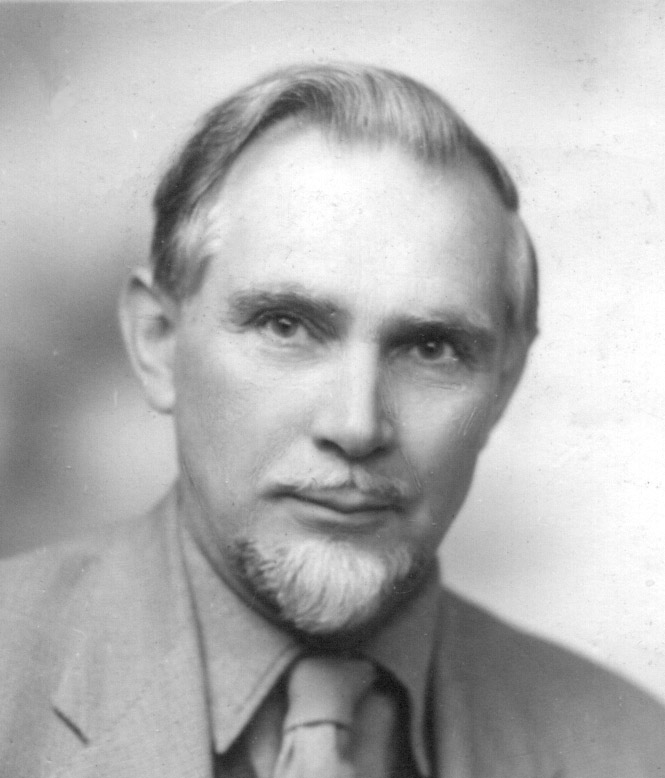
- Carl Plate in 1959
- Born: 19 December 1909; Perth, Western Australia
- Died: 15 May 1977 (aged 67); Woronora, New South Wales, Australia
- Education: Central School of Arts and Crafts, St Martins School of Art
- Known for: Lyrical abstraction, Collage
- Notable work: Graph Segments No 1

Carl Olaf Plate (19 December 1909 – 15 May 1977) was a prominent Australian modernist painter and collage artist.

== Biography ==
Born in Perth, Western Australia, Plate was the son of German born artist and writer Adolph Gustav Plate and the younger brother of artist Margo Lewers.

While working in advertising, he studied part-time at the East Sydney Technical College during 1930–34. In 1935 Plate travelled to Europe via Cuba, Mexico and the USA. Between 1935–40 he studied at Central School of Arts and Crafts under Bernard Meninsky and at St Martins School of Art under Vivian Pitchforth where he was influenced by Pitchforth’s ideas on ‘holistic composition’. Through his friend Arthur Wheen, he began to mix with leading English artists and writers such as Roland Penrose, Herbert Read and T. S. Eliot. The 1936 London International Surrealist Exhibition stimulated his interest in collage. While living in London he also travelled extensively in Europe, including Scandinavia and the USSR.

Returning from France in 1940, he re-established the Notanda Gallery in Rowe Street Sydney, as a contemporary art gallery and later book and print shop focussing on Modernism. Between 1940 and 1943 Plate curated many exhibitions at the Notanda Gallery including England Today: Exhibition of Modern British Art featuring 64 works by 34 artists including Barbara Hepworth, Henry Moore, Paul Nash, and Ben Nicholson; a Balinese art show, 20th Century Masters, a show of prints including Braque, Klee, Kokoschka, Odilon Redon, Dalí and Modern French Art which included works by Braque, Joan Miró and Picasso. Notanda Gallery also presented solo exhibitions by Plate and Desiderius Orban.

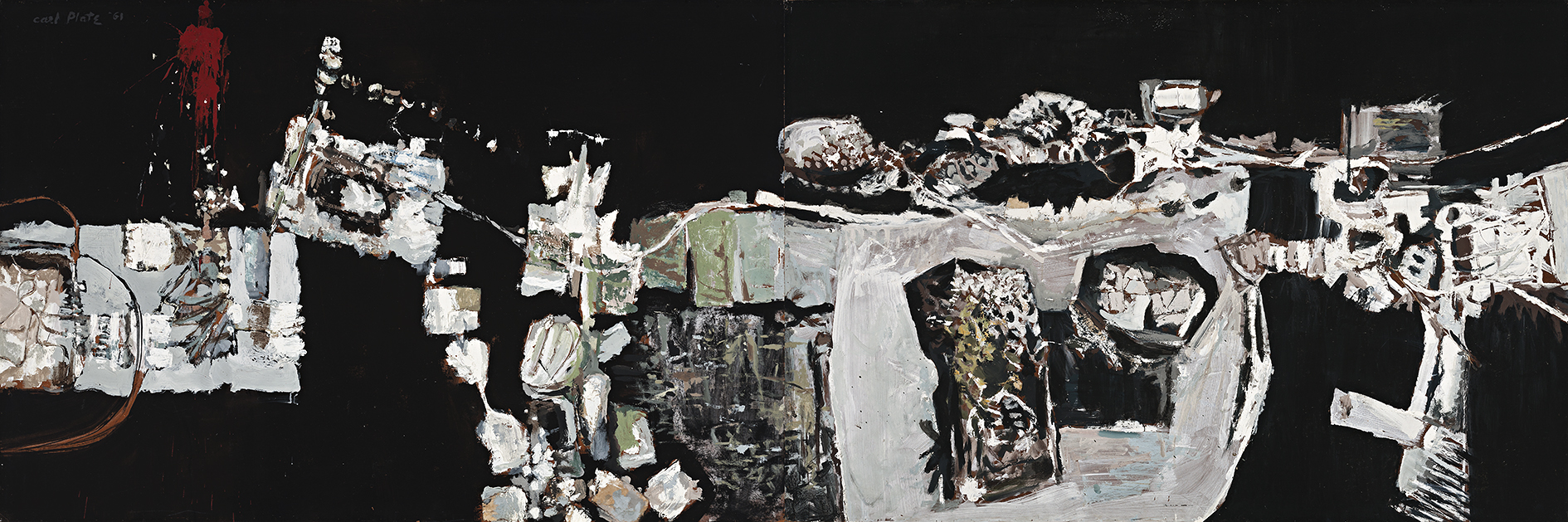
Carl Plate, 1961,Graph Segments No. 1, pva and mixed media on hardboard, 122 x 365 cm, National Gallery of Australia

In the 1940s and '50s, Plate was a prominent board member and exhibitor of the NSW Branch of the Contemporary Art Society (Australia).

Plate had 28 solo exhibitions in his lifetime. and was the first Australian non-figurative artist to have solo exhibitions in London and New York, at the Leicester Galleries, 1959 and Knapik Gallery, 1962 which included his large scale painting Graph Segments No. 1. He exhibited in numerous group exhibitions including Contemporary Australian Painting which toured the Pacific in 1956, Recent Australian Painting at the Whitechapel Gallery, Australian Contemporary Art at the São Paulo Biennial in 1961 and Australian Painting Tate Gallery London, 1962. Plate was a member of the group calling themselves Sydney 9, which included Robert Hughes, Robert Klippel, Clement Meadmore, John Olsen and Stanislav Rapotec, holding exhibitions in Sydney and Melbourne to show that as well as the Antipodeans, the Sydney abstractionists were an important part of the Australian art scene. He was represented by the Hungry Horse Gallery and Bonython Gallery, Sydney and Galerie de France in Paris. In Paris he collaborated with Alekos Fassianos on a lithography series. In 1967 he won the Aubusson tapestry-Australian Wool Board Prize (dual), travelling to France to complete the tapestry design.

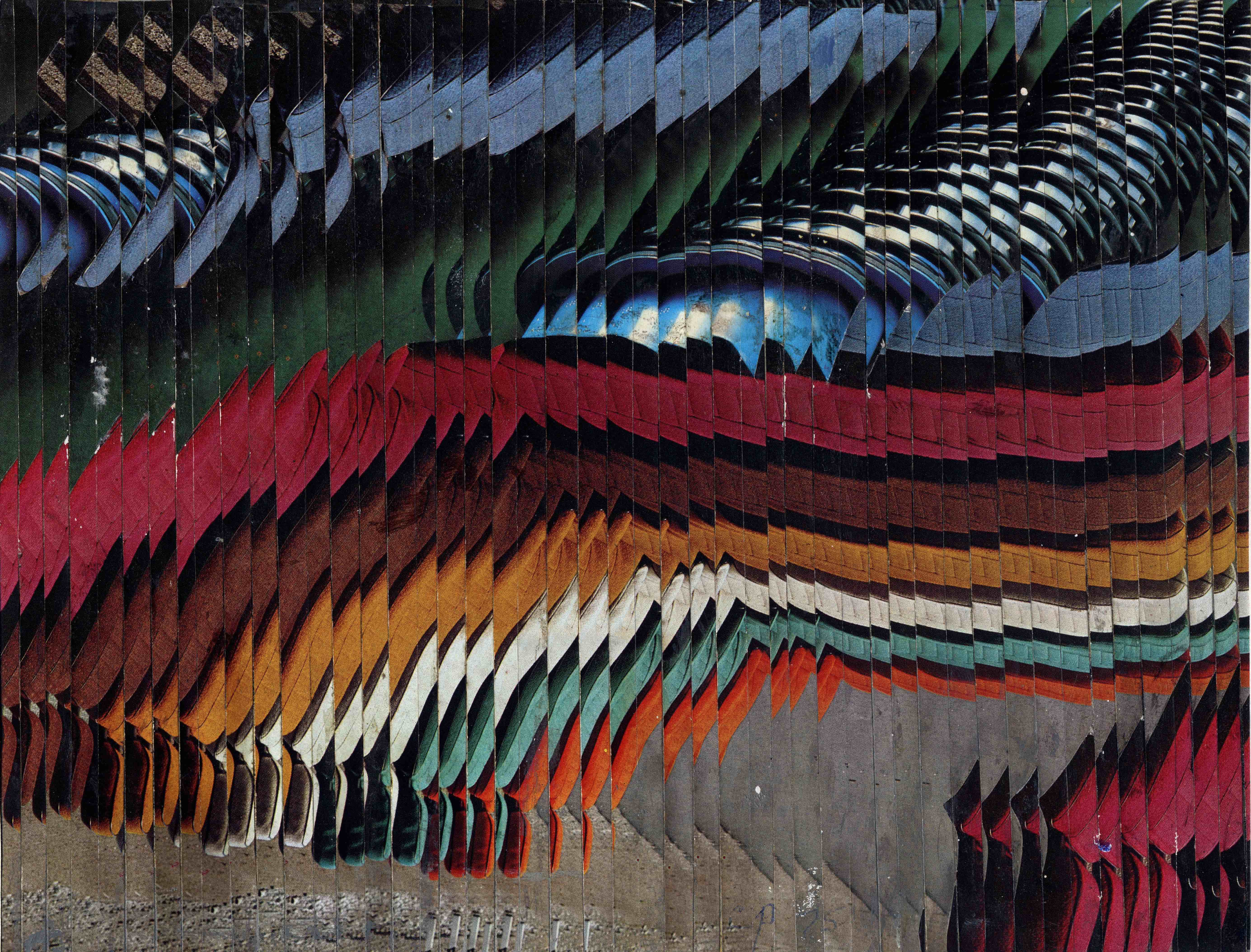
Carl Plate, 1975, Rows, collage

Plate lived and worked most of his life in the Sydney suburb of Woronora and lived and worked in France for extended periods. In 1945 he married painter Jocelyn Zander, daughter of curator Clarice Zander. He was a close friend of celebrated Greek writer Costas Taktsis. Taktsis's novel The Third Wedding Wreath (Το τρίτο στεφάνι) is dedicated to Carl and Jocelyn Plate. Plate died at Woronora in 1977.

In the same year the Art Gallery of New South Wales presented a retrospective of his work Project 22, Carl Plate 1909–1977. His collage, paintings and sculpture are represented in many collections including the National Gallery of Australia, Art Gallery of New South Wales, National Gallery of Victoria, Art Gallery of Western Australia, Newcastle Art Gallery, Tasmanian Museum and Art Gallery, Queensland Art Gallery, Reserve Bank of Australia, Artbank, Merz Collection USA, Cornell University Collection, Australian Embassy Washington and private collections in Argentina, Australia, France, New Zealand, Greece, UK and the USA.
