= Alekos Fassianos =

Greek painter (1935–2022)

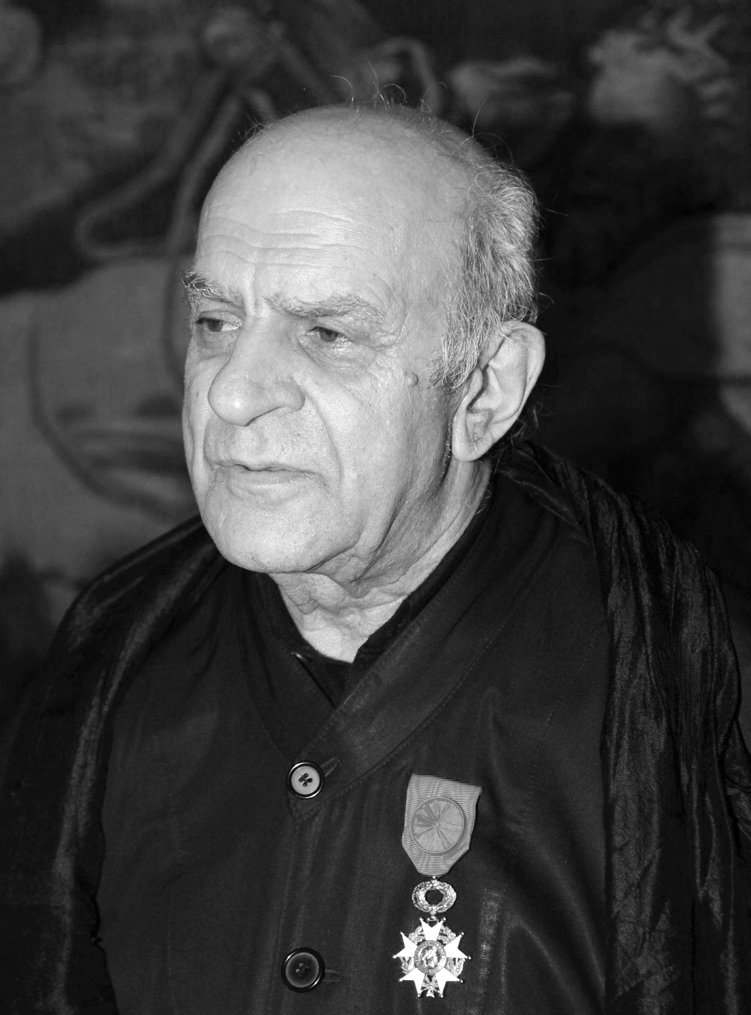
- Born: 13 December 1935; Athens, Greece
- Died: 16 January 2022 (aged 86)
- Education: Athens School of Fine Arts, Paris School of Fine Arts
- Known for: Painting, drawing, lithograph
- Notable work: The Messenger (1981), Adam & Eve (2000)

Alekos Fassianos (Greek: Αλέκος Φασιανός, 13 December 1935 – 16 January 2022) was a renowned Greek painter. He gained recognition for his distinctive style, which was characterized by immediacy and a deliberate departure from standardized painting techniques.

== Life and career ==
The son of a musician and a philologist, and the grandson of a priest, Fassianos was born in Athens. During the Axis Occupation, he lived for a short time in a village in Nafpaktia to ensure his survival. After the war, he lived for a short time in Livadeia, where his mother was a teacher. During his school years in Athens, he met Lefteris Papadopoulos, Theodoros Angelopoulos, and Christos Giannaras.

He studied violin at the Athens Conservatory and later painting at the Athens School of Fine Arts from 1956 to 1960 in the studio of Yannis Moralis, while also taking classes with Yannis Tsarouchis, an artist who had a decisive influence on the artist's work. During his studies, he participated in his first exhibitions, collaborated with Tsarouchis, Minos Argyrakis, and architect Aris Konstantinidis, and expanded his circle of acquaintances to include Odysseas Elytis, Takis Sinopoulos, Andreas Embeirikos, Kostas Tachtsis, Eleni Vakalo, and other prominent figures of the time. Fassianos' first solo exhibition took place at the A23 Gallery in Athens.

He then studied lithography and printmaking at the École des Beaux-Arts in Paris, on a scholarship from the French government (1960–1963), in the studios of Pierre-Eugène Clairin and Georges Dayez. In 1966, he held his first exhibition in Paris. Its success led to the artist's long-standing presence in the French art scene, which lasted for five decades. During the military dictatorship in Greece, he lived in self-imposed exile in Paris.

During his tenure in France, Fassianos collaborated in numerous ways with the writers Jean-Marie Drot, Pierre Seghers and Bernard Gheerbrant, the photographer and art gallerist Paul Facchetti, and with the Fata Morgana publishing house, following a referral by Louis Aragon.

In the 1970s, he participated in the Venice and São Paulo Biennales, expanding his collaborations and exhibiting in New York City, Milan, Geneva, Tokyo, and elsewhere. Over the next decade, he participated in major exhibitions such as the 1984 FIAC and the Baden-Baden Graphic Design Biennale (1985), while retrospective exhibitions dedicated to his work began to be organized.

Fasianos continued his artistic output in the years that followed, receiving numerous awards and participating in retrospective exhibitions. In 2000, he created works for the Metaxourgeio Station of the Athens Metro. After 2002, he was based in Athens. He remained active in the art scene until the final years of his life. On 13 December 2007, a Fassianos painting titled The Messenger sold for €550,701 at Bonhams in London.

Fassianos died on 16 January 2022, at the age of 86.

== Work ==
Since 1959, the year of his first solo exhibition in Athens, he has held more than seventy individual exhibitions both in Greece and abroad. He has repeatedly participated in collective exhibitions and renowned international events around the world. Fassianos was also active in printmaking, poster and jewelry design, as well as architecture, furniture design, and ceramics.

He also served as a set designer and costume designer for productions at the National Theater of Greece (Kafka’s America, 1975; Euripides’ Helen, 1976; Aristophanes’ The Birds, 1978, among others), the National Theater of Northern Greece, the Greek National Opera, and others. He worked with directors including Karolos Koun, Alexis Solomos, and Giorgos Messalas.

He illustrated numerous books in Greece and France by well-known poets and authors, as well as album covers. He has also published his own articles and books (both prose and poetry). Fassianos's paintings are characterized by immediacy and a rejection of standardization. His distinctive style took shape in the early 1960s. Three central themes have remained constant throughout his career: people (primarily depicted as cyclists or smokers), nature, and the environment. His study of Greek culture and his engagement with the graphic arts and printmaking also influenced his paintings.

His works can be found in art galleries, museums, and private collections around the world (the National Gallery, the Averoff Gallery, the Athens Municipal Gallery, the Mobilier National, the Museum of Modern Art in Paris, Centre Pompidou, Fondation Maeght, etc.). His works are also on display at the museum bearing his name, which has been open since 2023 in Metaxourgeio, on the grounds of his family former house.

== Honours ==
- 1985: Knight of the Order of Arts and Letters (France)
- 2009: Honorary Member of the Russian Academy of Fine Arts (Russia)
- 2010: Officer of the Order of Arts and Letters (France)
- 2013: Officer of the National Order of the Legion of Honour (France)
- 2020: Commander of the Order Arts and Letters (France)

== Collection and exhibition history ==
=== Public and private collections ===
France

- National Centre for Visual Arts (CNAP)
- Paris Museum of Modern Art (MAM Paris)
- Mobilier National Museum, Paris
- Maeght Foundation, Saint Paul de Vence
- Villa Tamaris Art Center, La Seyne Sur Mer
- Paul Valéry Museum, Sète
- Center of engraving and printed image, La Louvière
- Museum of Grenoble, Grenoble

Greece and Cyprus

- National Art Gallery – Alexandros Soutzos Museum, Athens
- Benaki Museum, Athens
- Cycladic Art Museum, Athens
- Frissiras Museum, Athens
- Theocharakis Foundation, Athens
- American College of Greece (ACG Art), Athens
- Hellenic Olympic Committee, Athens
- European Culture Centre of Delphi, Delphi
- Museum of the Olive and Greek Olive Oil, Sparta
- Macedonian Museum of Contemporary Art (MMCA), Thessaloniki
- Averoff Museum, Metsovo
- Museum of Contemporary Art Andros, Andros
- Municipality of Rhodes Modern Greek Art Museum, Rhodes
- Nikos Kazantzakis Museum, Crete
- Historical Archive – Museum of Hydra (I.A.M.Y), Hydra
- Nicosia Municipal Art Center (NiMAC), Nicosia, Cyprus
- Pierides Museum, Nicosia, Cyprus

Worldwide

- Hellenic Foundation for Culture, New-York, Usa
- Hellenic Foundation for Culture, London, United-Kingdom
- Creator Vesevo, Ercolano, Italy
- Osten Museum of Drawing, Skopje, North Macedonia
- Museum of history and religion, Saint-Petersburg, Russia

=== Solo shows ===
==== 1970s ====
- 1978 Galerie Origrafica, Malmö, Sweden

==== 1980s ====
- 1987 Galerie Origrafica, Malmö, Sweden

==== 1990s ====
- 1991 Galerie Zoumboulakis, Athens, Greece
- 1991 Galerie La Hune – Brenner, Paris, France
- 1992 SAGA, Grand Palais, Galerie La Hunne – Brenner, Paris, France
- 1992 Galerie Grafika Tokyo, Tokyo, Japan
- 1992 Galerie Zoumboulakis, Athens, Greece
- 1992 Galerie Origrafica, Malmö, Sweden
- 1993 Galerie Beaubourg, Paris, France
- 1993 Macedonian Museum of Contemporary Art (MMCA), Retrospective, Thessaloniki, Greece
- 1993 Galerie La Hune – Brenner, Paris, France
- 1994 Galerie Origrafica, Malmö, Sweden
- 1995 Galerie La Hune – Brenner, Paris, France
- 1996 Galerie Pudelco, Bonn, Germany
- 1996 Kunstkabinett Regensburg, Regensburg, Germany
- 1996 Jaski Art Gallery, Amsterdam, Netherlands
- 1997 Paul Valery Museum & Nikos Kazantakis Museum (Twinning), Sète, France
- 1997 Galerie Grafika Tokyo, Tokyo, Japan
- 1998 European Culture Center of Delphi, Retrospective, Delphi, Greece
- 1998 Galerie Rachlin-Lemarié, Angels and Loves, Paris, France
- 1999 Paul Valery Museum, Sète, France
- 1999 NIKAF art fair, Galerie Futura, Tokyo, Japan

==== 2000s ====
- 2000 Art Miami, Galerie Futura, Miami, Usa
- 2000 Galerie La Hune – Brenner, Paris, France
- 2000 Galerie Rachlin-Lemarié, Daily Mythology, Paris, France
- 2000 Villa Kerylos, Daily Mythology, Beaulieu-sur-Mer, France
- 2000 Galerie Bixio 2, Milan, Italy
- 2001 Hellenic Foundation for Culture, New York, Usa
- 2001 Château de Chenonceau, Le Mythe à bicyclette, Chenonceau, France
- 2002 Museum of Cycladic Art, The winners, Athens, Greece
- 2003 Hellenic Foundation for Culture, London, United-Kingdom
- 2003 Galerie Zannettacci, Geneva, Switzerland
- 2003 Galerie La Hune – Brenner, Les Travaux Des Dieux, Paris, France
- 2003 Galerie Grafika Tokyo, Tokyo, Japan
- 2004 Benaki Museum, Travaux, mythes, Eros, Athens, Greece
- 2004 National Art Gallery, A. Soutzos Museum, Everyday Mythologies, Athens, Greece
- 2004 Galerie Grafika Tokyo, Tokyo, Japan
- 2005 Tem Sanat Galerisi, Alecos Fassianos, Istanbul, Turkey
- 2005 Galerie Zannettacci, Geneva, Switzerland
- 2007 Galerie Potnia Thiron, L'éternel Retour, Athens, Greece
- 2007 Galerie Schneider, Munich, Germany
- 2008 Galerie Di Meo, Eroticon, Paris, France
- 2008 Central House of Artists, Moscow, Russia
- 2008 Galerie Potnia Thiron, Tout ce qu'il nous reste, Athens, Greece
- 2009 Galerie Helenbeck, Soft Mythology, Nice, France
- 2009 Galerie Zannettacci, Geneva, Switzerland
- 2009 Municipality of Rhodes Modern Greek Art Museum, Fassianos – 45 Years Of Creation, Rhodes, Greece

==== 2010s ====
- 2010 Galerie Grafika Tokyo, The Aegean Breeze, Tokyo, Japan
- 2010 Galerie Pierre-Alain Challier, Recovery of happiness, Paris, France
- 2010 Galerie Thierry Salvador, Memories, Brussels, Belgium
- 2011 Opera Gallery, Fassianos, London, United Kingdom
- 2011 Villa Tamaris Art center, Memories, La Seyne-sur-Mer, France
- 2011 Galerie Herrmann, Fassianos, Berlin, Germany
- 2011 Pavlos Kountouriotis Mansion, Fassianos: Giorgos Economopoulos Collection, Hydra, Grèce
- 2011 Tem Sanat Galerisi, Fassianos, Istanbul, Turkey
- 2011 Hellenic Museum, Fassianos, Ancient myth – Modern situations, Melbourne, Australia
- 2012 Galerie Di Meo, Fassianos, The light rediscovered, Paris, France
- 2012 Galerie Estades, Fassianos, Lyon, France
- 2012 Abbaye-école de Sorèze, Alecos Fassianos et sa muse Gudrun Von Leitner, Sorèze, France
- 2012 Grosvenor Gallery, Everyday myths, London, United Kingdom
- 2014 Galerie Zannettacci, Fassianos, Geneva, Switzerland
- 2014 Galerie Française – Gérard Schneider, Fassianos, Munich, Germany
- 2014 Espace Paul-et-André-Vera, Fassianos, Saint-Germain-en-Laye, France
- 2015 Kapopoulos Fine Arts, Alekos Fassianos, Mykonos, Greece
- 2016 Museum of History and religion, Ancient Greek Myths in everyday life, Saint-Petersburg, Russia
- 2016 Kapopoulos Fine Arts, Apocalypse, Patmos, Greece
- 2016 Galerie Pierre-Alain Challier, Fassianos – joie de vivre, Paris, France
- 2017 Kapopoulos Fine Arts, Alekos Fassianos, Athens, Greece
- 2018 Galerie Sophie Scheidecker, Fassianos, Paris, France
- 2018 Iris Gallery, Small works, Athens, Greece
- 2018 Historical Archive – Museum of Hydra (I.A.M.Y), Fassianos in France, Hydra, Greece
- 2019 Galerie Estades, Alecos Fassianos, Paris, France

=== Group exhibitions ===
- 1963 Pantechnicon, San Francisco
- 1965 SWEA, Stockholm
- 1968 Biennale of Menton
- 1982 Palais des Congrès : Europalia with Caras, Christoforou, Gaïtis & Alkis Pierrakos, Brussels, Belgium
- 2000 Kunstkabinett Regensburg, Contemporary Drawings and Sculptures, Regensburg, Germany
- 2009 Opera Gallery, Fassianos – Timur D'Vatz, Dubai, United Arab Emirates
- 2011 Galerie Pascal Polar, The Figurative Art of Greek Artists, Brussels, Belgium
- 2012 Musée du verre et de ses métiers, Daum – Art, luxury & crystal, Dordives, France
- 2012 Opera Gallery, A Century of Nudes, Geneva, Switzerland
- 2013 Villa Tamaris Art Center, Retrospective, La Seyne-sur-Mer, France
- 2014 Galerie Morfi, Group exhibition of Cypriot and Greek artists, Limassol, Cyprus
- 2015 Galerie David Hicks, Fassianos – Oppenheim, Paris, France
- 2016 Opera Gallery, Shades of blue, Monaco, France
- 2016 Ikastikos Kiklos Sianti Gallery, Small Paintings, Athens, Greece
- 2016 Manege Central Exhibition Hall, Genii Loci – Greek Art From 1930 To The Present, Saint-Petersburg, Russia
- 2017 Manoir du Boulanc, Greeks !, Verderonne, France
- 2017 Kapopoulos Fine Arts, Segui – Fassianos, Mykonos, Greece
- 2017 Ikastikos Kiklos Sianti Gallery, Small Paintings, Athens, Greece
- 2018 Paul Valéry Museum, Painting and Poetry, Sète, France
- 2018 Moca Skopje, The Greek Collection, Skopje, North Macedonia
- 2018 Maeght Foundation, The Spirit of a Collection : Gifts, Saint-Paul-de-Vence, France
- 2019 Roma Gallery, Alekos Fassianos – Dimitris Mytaras, Athens, Greece
- 2019 Ikastikos Kiklos Sianti Gallery, A Beach in the City, Athens, Greece
- 2019 Theocharakis Foundation, Alekos Fassianos, Vangelis Chronis – 30 Years of Friendship, Paintings and poetry, Athens, Greece
- 2020 Galerie Élysée Saint-Honoré, Yves Navarre meets Alekos Fassianos, Paris, France

== See also ==
- Art in modern Greece
- National Gallery of Greece
- Contemporary Greek Art
