= Oedipus the King (film) =

1968 film adaptation of Sophoclean tragedy, directed by Philip Saville

- Directed by: Philip Saville
- Written by: Michael Luke; Philip Saville; Paul Roche
- Based on: Oedipus Rex by Sophocles
- Produced by: Michael Luke
- Starring: Christopher Plummer; Orson Welles; Lilli Palmer; Richard Johnson
- Cinematography: Walter Lassally
- Edited by: Paul Davies
- Music by: Jani Christou
- Production companies: Crossroads World Film Services; Universal Pictures
- Distributed by: Rank Film Distributors
- Release date: June 1968
- Running time: 97 minutes
- Country: United Kingdom
- Language: English

Oedipus the King is a 1968 British film adaptation of the Sophoclean tragedy Oedipus Rex, directed and co-written by Philip Saville. It stars Christopher Plummer as the title character, Orson Welles as Tiresias, Lilli Palmer as Jocasta, Richard Johnson as Creon and Donald Sutherland as the leading member of the Chorus, though the latter's voice was dubbed by Valentine Dyall. The score was composed by Jani Christou.

Saville's first theatrical film effort, the film remained highly theatrical in nature, and is known for its intensive dialogue typical of an ancient play. It was released in the UK by Rank Film Distributors in June 1968.

== Plot ==
The film is a largely faithful adaptation of the original text, with a screenplay based on Paul Roche's translation directly from the Greek published in the early 1950s. However, the film went a step further than the play, by actually showing, in flashback, the murder of King Laius. It also showed Oedipus and Jocasta in bed together, making love.

== Cast ==
- Christopher Plummer as Oedipus
- Orson Welles as Tiresias
- Lilli Palmer as Jocasta
- Richard Johnson as Creon
- Cyril Cusack as the Messenger
- Roger Livesey as the Shepherd
- Donald Sutherland as Chorus Leader
  - Valentine Dyall as the Chorus Leader's voice
- Friedrich von Ledebur as King Laius
- Dimos Starenios as the Priest
- Alexis Mann as the Palace Official
- Oenone Luke as Antigone
- Cressida Luke as Xemene
- Minos Argyrakis, Takis Emmanuel, and Paul Roche as Members of the Chorus

== Production ==
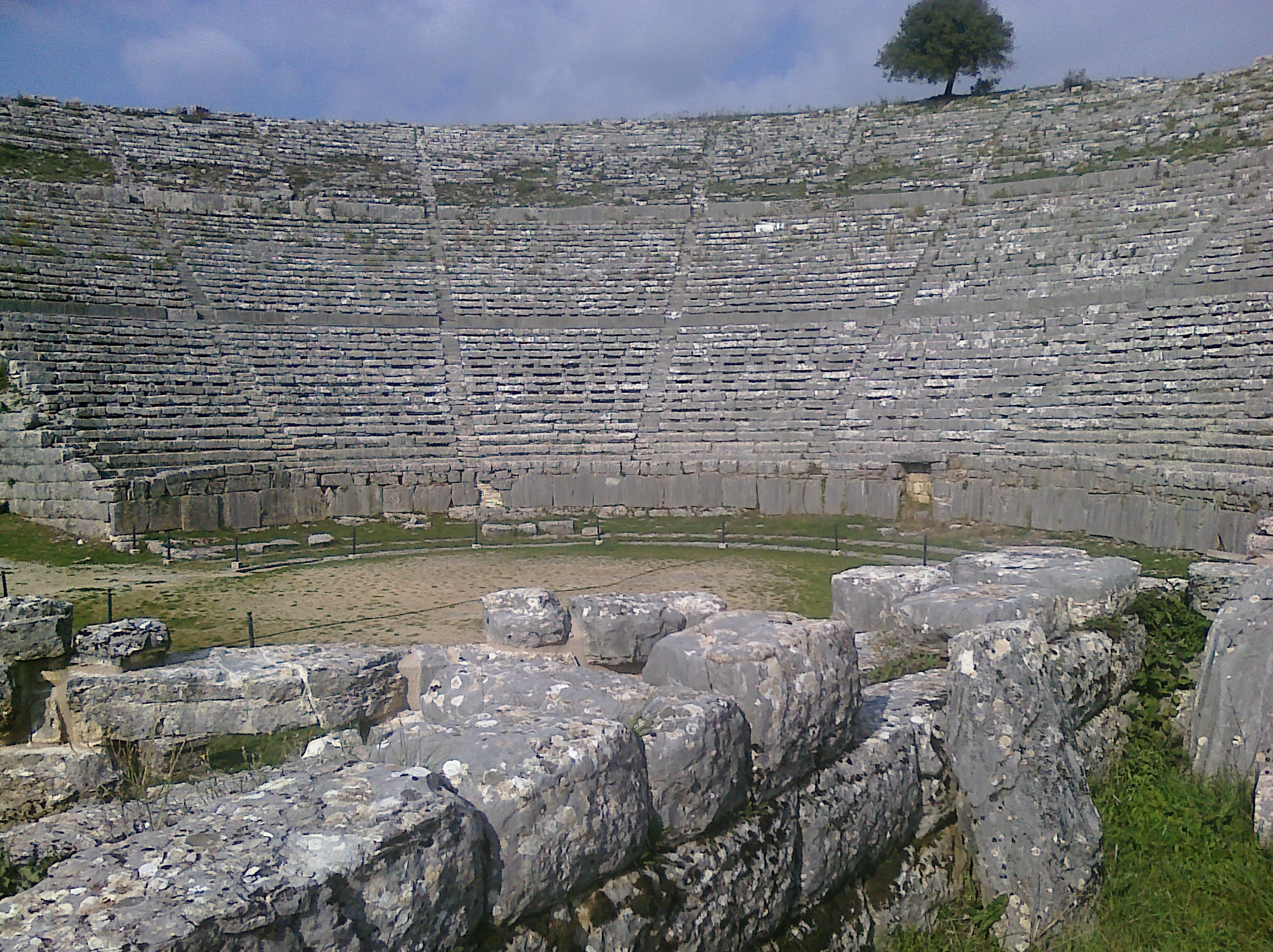
The amphitheatre in Dodoni.

Filming of Oedipus the King began in August 1967, on-location in Epirus, Greece, in the municipality of Ioannina. Much of the film was shot in an ancient amphitheatre, since converted into an archaeological site, at Dodoni.

Many of the cast members were from the Royal Shakespeare Company. Theoni V. Aldredge (credited as 'Deni Vachlioti') was the costume designer.

== Reception ==
The film was released in the United Kingdom in June 1968, by Rank Film Distributors. It was not seen in Europe and the U.S. until the 1970s and '80s, after legal release and distribution rights were granted to video and TV, and was considered a rare film.

=== Critical response ===
Despite its calibre of actors, the film was not universally well received. New York Magazine described it as "almost comical" in a September 1968 review; a 1972 review said "An elaborate production, overly academic and without much force or cinematic merit." Leonard Maltin in 2006 said that the "film version of Sophocles play is OK for students who have a test on it the next day, but others won't appreciate this version."

However, in 1968 the Illustrated London News praised its "cinematic fluidity" and Jon Solomon in 2001 said that the film was "distinguished by intensity and fine acting", with Plummer's Oedipus boasting "an arrogant, strong-willed title character". However, Solomon also remarked that the film "would never have won first prize at an ancient Athenian contest.
