= Alekos Fassianos Museum =

Art museum in Athens, Greece

Coordinates: 37.99°N 23.72°E

- Αλέκος Φασιανός Μουσειο
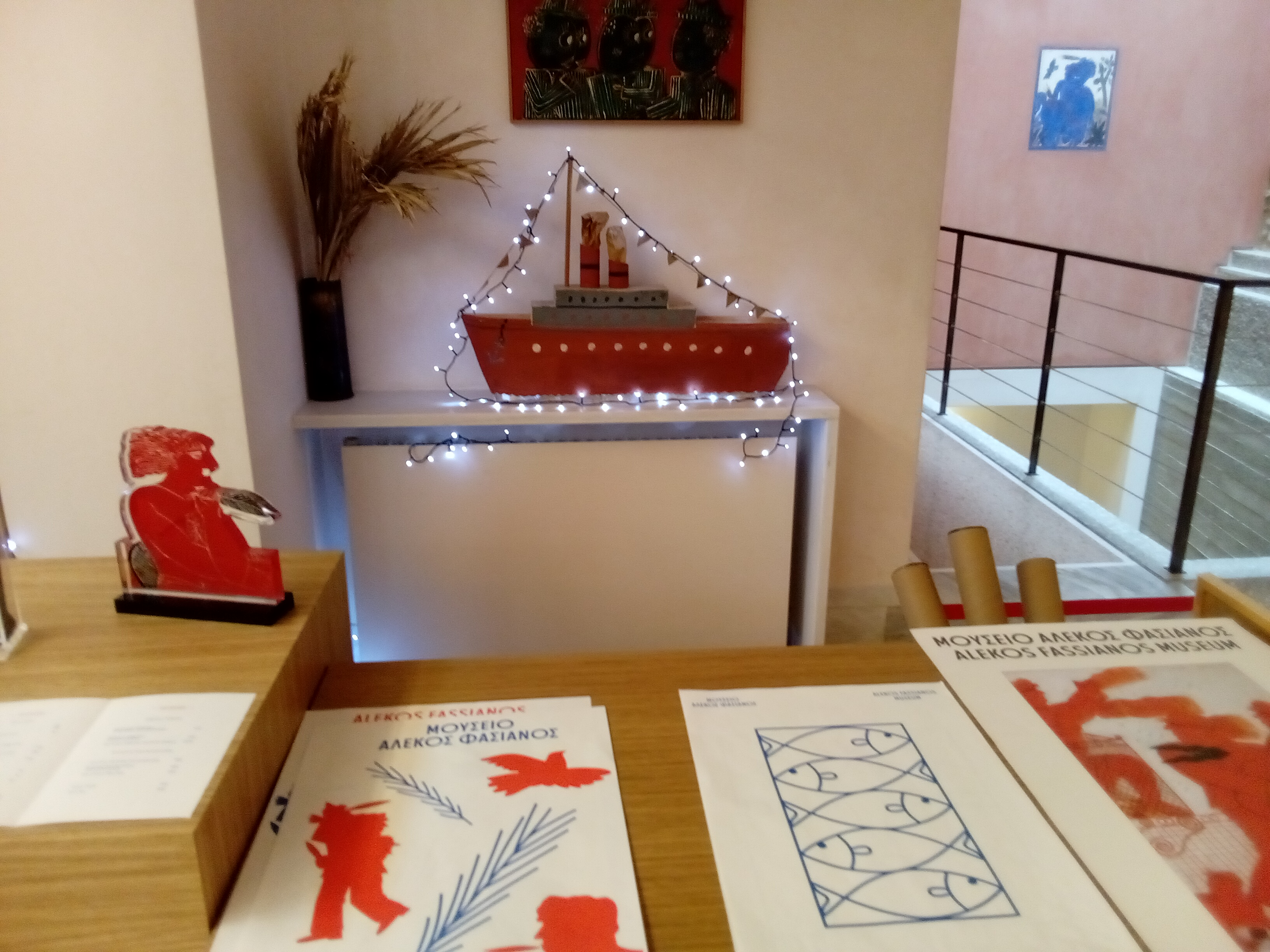
- Ground Floor of Alekos Fassianos Art Museum
- Established: October 21, 2023
- Location: Metaxourgeio, Athens, Greece
- Type: Art museum
- Executive director: Viktoria Fassianou
- Directors: Ioanna Piperigos, Nikos Fassianos
- Website: https://www.alekosfassianos.gr/en/alekos-fassianos-museum/

The Alekos Fassianos Museum (Greek: Μουσείο Αλέκος Φασιανός), is an art museum in Athens, Greece, dedicated to the life and multifaceted work of the Greek painter Alekos Fassianos (1935–2022).

== Building ==
The museum is located in the Metaxourgeio area, in the Agios Pavlos neighborhood, between the Metaxourgeio Metro station and the Athens railway station (also known as Larissa Station). Alekos Fassianos's family's neoclassical house once stood on this very site, but it was demolished in 1970 when the lot was traded away.

The museum is housed in a 1970s apartment building that was redesigned and reconstructed between 1990 and 1995 by the architect and Fassianos’ friend Kyriakos Krokos, in collaboration with the artist himself. In its current form, it is an example of modernism, incorporating elements from the three architectural phases it underwent, as well as the contribution of Fassianos, who oversaw the work and oversaw details such as the decoration, murals, floors, the design of door knobs and light fixtures, etc.

== Collection ==
The museum held its official opening on October 21, 2023. Its mission is to preserve, study, and promote Fassianos's artistic work. The permanent exhibition consists of the artist's works, such as paintings, drawings, engravings, sculptures, and handmade objects of daily use created by him, as well as archival material (texts, notes, sketches, correspondence, etc.). The exhibits span the period from the beginning of Fassianos's artistic career—including portraits of his mother and brother from 1954—through the end of his life.

The museum also hosts temporary exhibitions, educational programs, and other events.

== Gallery ==
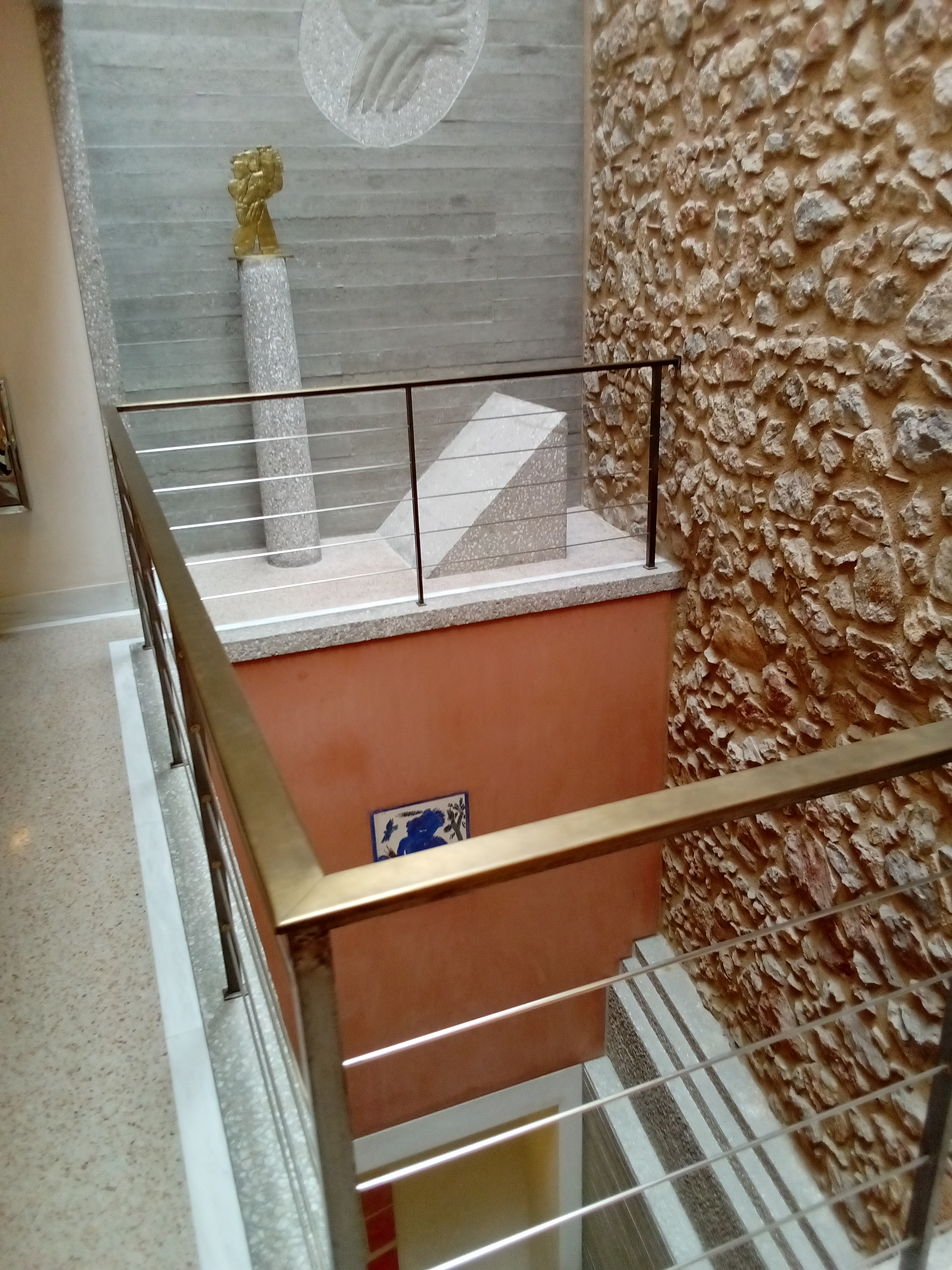
Upper floor

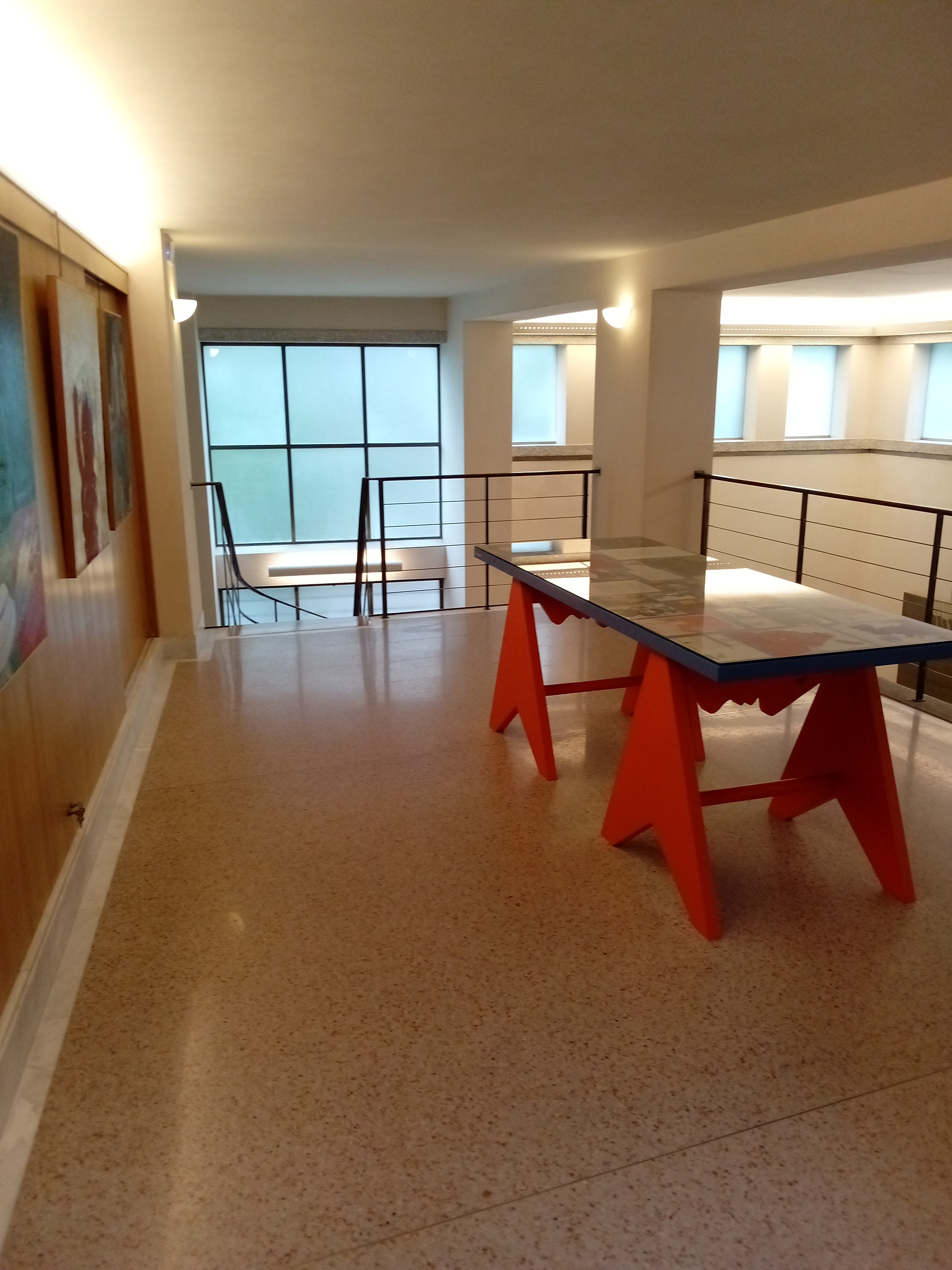
Indoor view

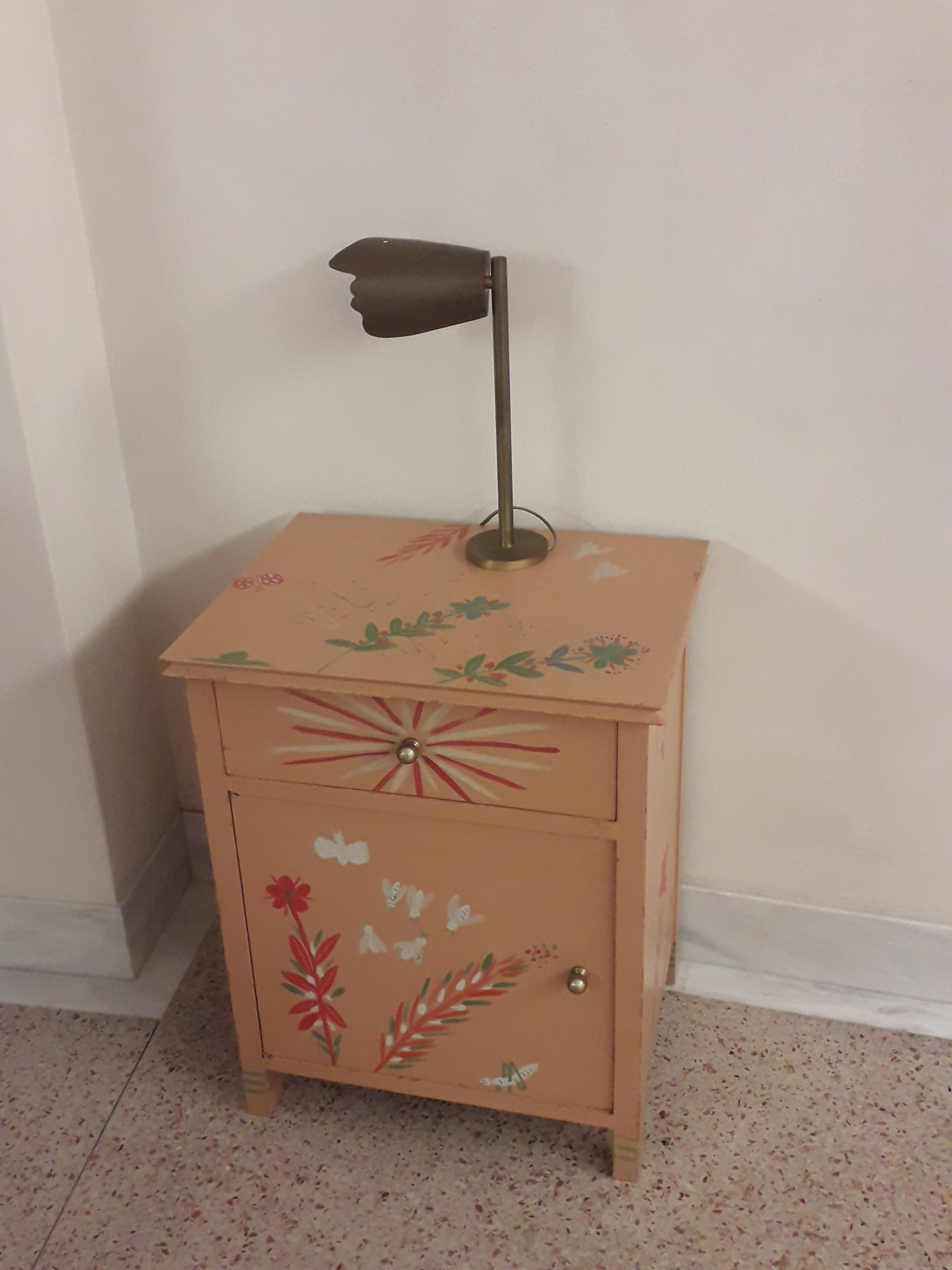
Bedside Table and Lamp by Alekos Fassianos

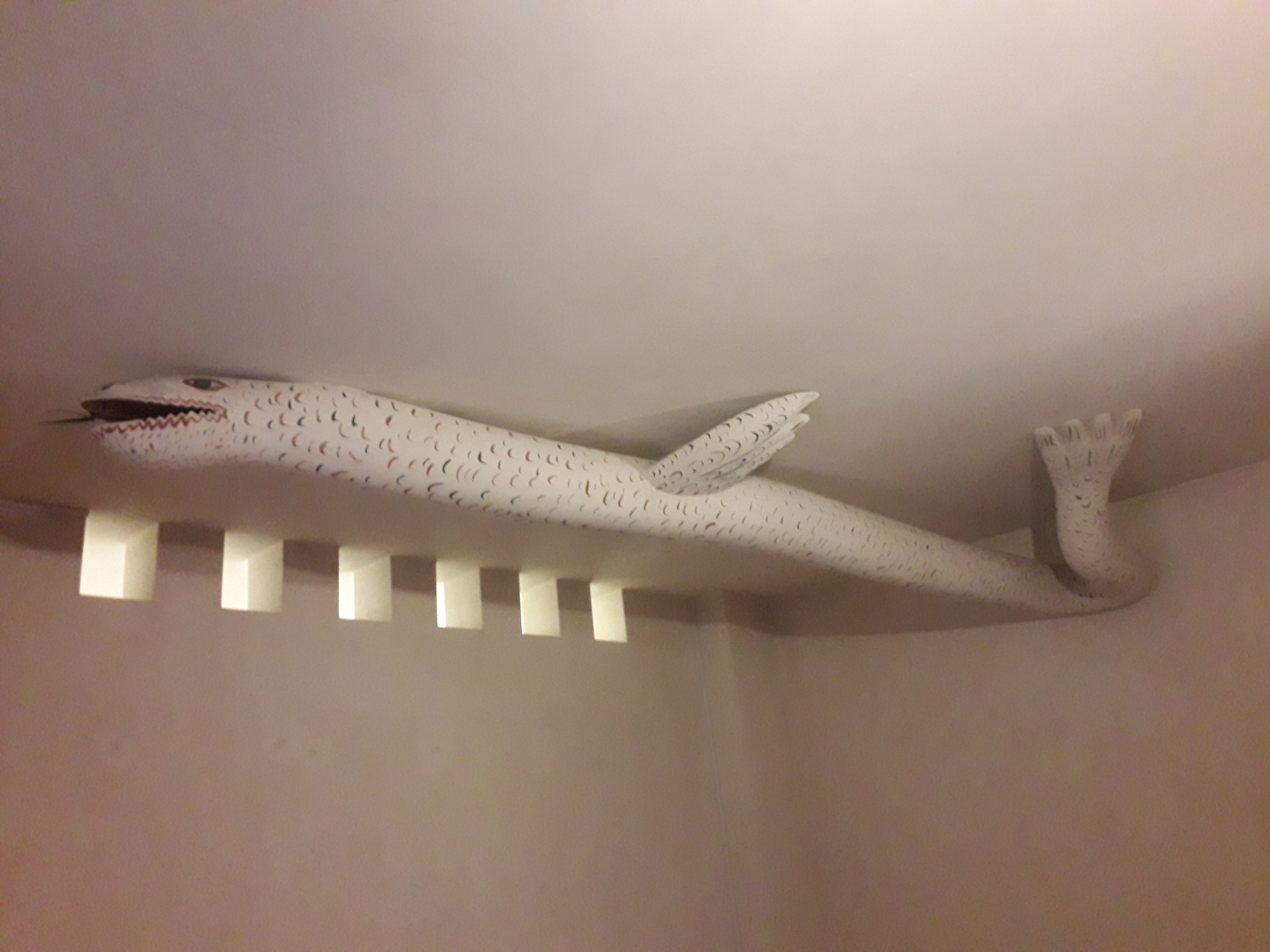
Decorative Plaster Dragon by Alekos Fassianos
