= Paul Roche =

British writer (1916–2007)

Donald Robert Paul Roche (/ˈrɔːʃ/; 25 September 1916 – 30 October 2007) was a British poet, novelist, and professor of English, a critically acclaimed translator of Greek and Latin classics, notably the works of Aeschylus, Sophocles, Euripides, Aristophanes, Sappho, and Plautus. Born in Mussoorie, India, Roche was an associate of the Bloomsbury group, especially of painter Duncan Grant, whom he met in the summer of 1946 and who lived with Roche and his family until Grant's death in 1978.

He used his translation of Sophocles', Oedipus Rex, to write a screenplay for a film version of the work released in 1967 with Christopher Plummer in the title role. Roche played a small role in the Greek chorus.

== Personal life ==
Roche was educated at Ushaw College. He was ordained as a priest in 1943. He earned his PhB and his PhL (Licentiate in Philosophy) at the Gregorianum, but left the priesthood in the 1950s. He was a father of four children with his wife, Clarissa Tanner, whom he divorced in 1983, and one son, Tobit, from a prior relationship with Mary Blundell.

Significantly, he also had a long relationship with the Bloomsbury painter, Duncan Grant and modelled for him for years, being the subject of hundreds of paintings and drawings. Roche returned to England from where he and his wife, Clarissa were living in In Mexico with their children, to be with Grant after Vanessa Bell's death, eventually joined by his entire family. He and Grant had not seen each other for eight years.

Roche's daughter has confirmed that her father was not Grant's lover.
