= May the Best House Win =

- Genre: Lifestyle
- Voices of: Guy Porritt
- Country of origin: United Kingdom
- Original language: English
- No. of series: 5 (regular series); 1 (abroad series)
- No. of episodes: 135(regular series); 20 (abroad series)

Production
- Executive producer: Ruth Gray
- Producer: Mark Robinson
- Running time: 60 minutes (inc. adverts)
- Production company: Shiver Productions

Original release
- Network: ITV
- Release: 22 February 2010 – 28 June 2013

Related
- Come Dine with Me; House Gift

May the Best House Win is a British lifestyle show that aired on ITV from 22 February 2010 to 28 June 2013 and was narrated by Guy Porritt. The show sees four proud homeowners compete to win £1,000 by showing off their homes to the other contestants, who will then rate their home based on their interior design, homeliness, comfort, and hospitality. Since 2014, repeats of the show had been airing on ITVBe

== Show overview ==
The programme consists of four homeowners each preparing their houses in their own unique style to impress the other three contestants, who rate the interior design, homeliness, comfort, and hospitality all in a bid to win £1,000. The show is often compared with other daytime shows Come Dine with Me and House Gift.

== Adaptation ==
An adaptation of this show was Mein Zuhause, Dein Zuhause – Wer wohnt am schönsten? on kabel eins in Germany in 2013.

The American version of the show is called May the Best House Win USA and it airs it on TLC.

== Criticism ==
The show has been criticised for being too much like Channel 4's Come Dine with Me, mainly in Harry Hill's TV Burp. Sian Brewis on Leicester Mercury described May The Best House Win as a Come Dine With Me, for houses. Lorraine Gibson of the Bournemouth Echo also noted the similarity predicting that the show would, like Come Dine With Me, eventually be transferred to the evening schedules. UKGameshows.com said "It's not such a bad programme really, but the likeness to Come Dine with Me is hard to ignore, and makes the programme feel quite derivative".

== Transmissions ==
=== May the Best House Win ===
Series	Start date	End date	Episodes
1	22 February 2010	5 March 2010	10
2	10 January 2011	18 February 2011	30
3	14 November 2011	23 December 2011	30
4	28 May 2012	10 July 2012	30
5	13 May 2013	28 June 2013	35

=== May the Best House Win Abroad ===
Series	Start date	End date	Episodes
1	1 October 2012	26 October 2012	20

=== Specials ===
Title	Start date	End date	Episodes
May the Best Christmas House Win	21 December 2010		1
