= Radiator (film) =

- Film poster
- Directed by: Tom Browne
- Written by: Tom Browne; Daniel Cerqueira
- Produced by: Tom Browne; Genevieve Stevens
- Starring: Daniel Cerqueira; Julia Ford; Richard Johnson; Gemma Jones
- Cinematography: David Johnson
- Edited by: Joe Randall-Cutler
- Music by: Simon Allen
- Production company: Eon Productions
- Distributed by: Picturehouse Entertainment
- Release dates: 15 October 2014 (London); 27 November 2015
- Running time: 93 minutes
- Country: United Kingdom
- Languages: English; French
- Box office: $41,101

Radiator is a 2014 British drama film directed by Tom Browne and co-written with Daniel Cerqueira, who also stars in the film along with Richard Johnson and Gemma Jones. The film was released on 27 November 2015 and received critical acclaim for its direction, acting, humour and emotion.

== Premise ==
Daniel's life is turned upside down when he is summoned to his parents' remote farm in order to help them adjust to their new squalor.

== Cast ==
- Daniel Cerqueira as Daniel
- Julia Ford as Jean
- Richard Johnson as Leonard
- Gemma Jones as Maria
- Frankie Browne as Charlie

Monty portrayed Captain, Leonard and Maria's dog.

== Production ==
Filming took place in the Lake District in Cumbria.

Radiator was Johnson's final film prior to his death on 5 June 2015.

== Release ==
Radiator premiered at the London Film Festival on 15 October 2014. The film was released in the United Kingdom on 27 November 2015.

== Accolades ==
Fisher was nominated for "Breakthrough British Filmmaker" at the London Film Critics Circle Awards 2015, but he lost to John Maclean for Slow West. Radiator won the Audience Award at Glasgow Film Festival 2015.
