= Richard Johnson (actor) =

British actor (1927–2015)

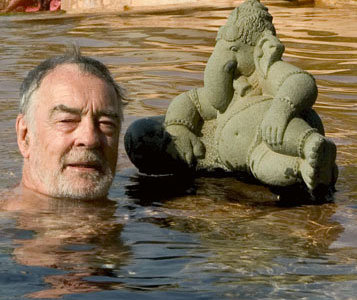
- Johnson c. 2008
- Born: Richard Keith Johnson; 30 July 1927; Upminster, Essex, England
- Died: 6 June 2015 (aged 87); Chelsea, London, England
- Education: Royal Academy of Dramatic Art
- Years active: 1950–2014
- Spouses: Sheila Sweet (m. 1957; div. 1962); Kim Novak (m. 1965; div. 1966); Marie-Louise Norlund (m. 1982; div. 1989); Lynne Gurney (m. 1989)
- Children: 4, including Jervis

Richard Keith Johnson (30 July 1927 – 6 June 2015) was an English stage and screen actor, writer and producer. Described by Michael Coveney as "a very 'still' actor – authoritative, calm and compelling," he was a staple performer in British films and television from the 1960s until the 2010s, often playing urbane sophisticates and authoritative characters. He had a distinguished theatrical career, notably as a cornerstone member of the Royal Shakespeare Company, and was once acclaimed as "the finest romantic actor of his generation."

== Biography ==
=== Early life and career ===
Johnson was born to Frances Louisa Olive (née Tweed) and Keith Holcombe Johnson in Upminster, Essex, in 1927.

Johnson went to Felsted School, and wanted to act instead of going into the family paint business. He trained at RADA and due to the manpower shortage of wartime made his first professional appearance relatively quickly, on stage in Manchester with John Gielgud's company in a production of Hamlet in 1944.

He served in the Royal Navy from 1945 to 1948.

=== Early screen appearances ===
Johnson made his screen debut in an adaptation of Tusitala for BBC Sunday-Night Theatre. He made his film debut with an uncredited part in Captain Horatio Hornblower (1951) and was also uncredited in Calling Bulldog Drummond (1951).

He was at the Shakespeare Memorial Theatre from 1952 to 1957. "It was an electric time to be in that company", he later recalled.

Johnson played Mr. Wickham in a 1952 TV adaptation of Pride and Prejudice (with Peter Cushing as Darcy) and was D'Artagnan in a TV adaptation of The Three Musketeers (1952). He could be seen in Lady in the Fog (1952), "The Mayor of Torontal" for Wednesday Theatre (1952), The Heir of Skipton (1953), Saadia (1953) for MGM, A Party for Christmas (1954), The Queen Came By (1954), "The Rescue" for ITV Television Playhouse, "The Orderly" for Theatre Royal, and Plaintiff in a Pretty Hat (1955).

In 1955, he was in The Lark, by Jean Anouilh, with Dorothy Tutin.

He was Laertes to Paul Scofield's Hamlet in 1956. That was directed by Peter Brook who also directed Johnson in Heaven and Earth (1957).

In 1958, he and Tutin played Romeo and Juliet at Stratford.

He also appeared in episodes of Assignment Foreign Legion, The Buccaneers, Armchair Theatre, and Four Just Men, and had the lead in Epilogue to Capricorn (1960).

=== Royal Shakespeare Company ===
In 1958, he appeared in Peter Hall's second production at the theatre, Cymbeline, alongside Peggy Ashcroft. Reviews were strong, praising Johnson as "The finest romantic actor of his generation".

Johnson appeared in the title role in Tony Richardson's production of Pericles, Prince of Tyre in 1958. The same year he was in Twelfth Night (as Sir Andrew Aguecheek) for Peter Hall.

Hall took over the direction of the company in 1959 – it was renamed the Royal Shakespeare Company (RSC), and he invited Johnson to be part of the first group of actors to be named an Associate Artist of the RSC, a position he retained until he died.

=== MGM ===
After Johnson's stage performances had received excellent reviews, MGM offered him a long-term contract in June 1959. His first work for the studio was in Never So Few (1959) with Frank Sinatra.

"I never took myself very seriously as a movie star", said Johnson later. "But it was thrilling to be among the idols I'd worshipped as a kid. I did a test with Gary Cooper, went to a party with Spencer Tracy, made a film with Frank Sinatra."

Johnson was director Terence Young's preferred choice for the role of James Bond in the first film in the series, but he had to turn the role down as he was under contract to MGM. Johnson said later, "Eventually they offered it to Sean Connery, who was completely wrong for the part. But in getting the wrong man they got the right man, because it turned the thing on its head and he made it funny. And that's what propelled it to success."

Johnson did Ondine on stage for the RSC with Leslie Caron and director Peter Hall (this was filmed in 1961). Also for TV he did productions of Journey's End, This Happy Breed, Sword of Vengeance and The Sponge Room.

In 1961–62, he portrayed Clive Root on Broadway in Graham Greene's The Complaisant Lover, which ran for 101 performances at the Ethel Barrymore Theatre.

Johnson was second-billed to George Sanders in Cairo (1963) for MGM-British. He co-starred with Claire Bloom in 80,000 Suspects (1963) for Val Guest.

He was then in The Haunting (1963) also featuring Claire Bloom and Julie Harris. It was directed by Robert Wise, who said Johnson has "the attack of the young Gable" and predicted he would be a big star.

Johnson wrote a play The Golden Age, composed from poems, diaries and speeches from the age of Queen Elizabeth I. It had a short run on Broadway in 1963.

In 1964 he did a Kingsley Amis script, A Question of Happiness #1: A Question About Hell for TV, followed by A Question of Happiness #2: Another Port, Another Storm.

Johnson had a support role in The Pumpkin Eater (1964) and went to France for The Other Woman (1964). He did episodes of Armchair Mystery Theatre, The Human Jungle, and The Alfred Hitchcock Hour. He also portrayed Duncan Sandys in Operation Crossbow (1965).

=== Film stardom ===
Johnson was second billed to Kim Novak in The Amorous Adventures of Moll Flanders (1965), directed by Terence Young. When filming ended, Johnson and Novak were married. Around this time he expressed interest in writing and directing as well as acting.

Johnson was Colonel Stewart in Khartoum (1966) with Charlton Heston and Laurence Olivier.

He was top billed in the Italian horror film The Witch (1966) then was cast as Bulldog Drummond in Deadlier Than the Male (1967) with Elke Sommer for director Ralph Thomas, a James Bond-style adventure. Johnson said about playing Drummond "I consciously tried to use more of myself than in anything else I've done... I said, all right, if you want me, you'll get me, but this is a braver, more physical version of me."

He supported Anthony Quinn and Rita Hayworth in The Rover (1967), again directed by Young. He starred in another James Bond-type spy film, Danger Route (1967) for director Seth Holt. He announced he had formed his own company and would star in An Alibi for a Playboy but it was not made.

Johnson was Creon in Oedipus the King (1968) with Christopher Plummer, then starred in the adventure film A Twist of Sand (1968).

He was a Roman officer in Columna (1968) and Horatio Nelson in Emma Hamilton (1968), with Michèle Mercier. He reprised his role as Drummond in Some Girls Do (1969).

Johnson later recalled in 2000 that "It comes as a curious shock to me now to realise that I was making around £1m a year in today's money. And I managed to spend it all having a hell of a good time... I knew it wasn't going to last for ever, but I also knew I had to enjoy it while the time was right." Filmink argued "Richard Johnson never became a star despite producers trying to make him one for a decade" later suggesting "Despite all these chances as a leading man, Johnson’s essential problem as a movie star remained – he had the looks, the voice, the ability, the talent, but he lacked personality. He was an ideal foil, but he couldn’t carry a movie."

Johnson played Rembrandt for British TV in 1969 and was Cassius in Charlton Heston's version of Julius Caesar (1970).

He did The Fifth Day of Peace (1970) with Franco Nero, Hamlet (1970) with Richard Chamberlain, The Beloved (1971) with Raquel Welch, A Man About a Dog (1972), A Marriage (1972) and I Want to Marry Your Son (1973).

=== Return to theatre ===
Johnson returned to theatre in 1972, going to Stratford to play Antony, opposite Janet Suzman's Cleopatra, in one of Trevor Nunn's season of Roman plays. He continued to act on TV in such shows as Thriller (1973) and Orson Welles' Great Mysteries, and filmed his Antony and Cleopatra (1974) for TV. He also co-starred with Diana Rigg in Molnar's The Guardsman on stage in London in 1978.

He did a horror film Beyond the Door (1974), and Churchill's People, The Night Child (1975), and Hennessy (1975) for director Don Sharp; he provided the original story of the latter.

Johnson was in episodes of Quiller, Space: 1999, and Hart to Hart. He was in the films Aces High (1976), Take All of Me (1976) in Italy, The Four Feathers (1978) for Sharp, The Comeback (1978), Screamers (1979), Zombi 2 (1979), The Flame Is Love (1979), Island of the Fishmen (1979) and The Great Alligator (1979). He had the lead in A Nightingale Sang in Berkeley Square (1979) directed by Thomas.

In the 1980s, Johnson could be seen in Spy!, Portrait of a Rebel: The Remarkable Mrs. Sanger (1980), Haywire (1980), The Marquise (1980), The Monster Club (1981), The Member for Chelsea (1981), The Kenny Everett Television Show, Tales of the Unexpected (several episodes), Cymbeline (1982) in the title role, Magnum, P.I., The Aerodrome (1983), and Mr. Palfrey of Westminster (1984).

=== Producer ===
In 1982, Johnson helped set up United British Artists, the film and theatre-producing company, along with fellow actors Albert Finney, Maggie Smith and Glenda Jackson. Johnson said, "In this profession it is mighty irritating always to be in the hands of other people, waiting on the end of a telephone, unable to guide your ship. When I propounded the idea that we all get together to do high-quality work on a continuing commercial basis, they were very enthusiastic."

He acted in and was executive producer on The Biko Inquest (1984). Johnson acted in What Waits Below (1985) for Don Sharp, and acted in and produced Turtle Diary (1985). He worked as a producer on Castaway (1986) and The Lonely Passion of Judith Hearne (1987).

Johnson says however that the company "didn't quite come off. Unfortunately we ran out of money. We didn't have enough to start with... One day I was in Hollywood with my old friend Angela Lansbury and she said, 'Anybody can be a producer. You've got talent and you're wasting it.' I decided to get back to what I've always wanted to do since I was seven: acting. I'd like to be on test. I need challenges."

Filmink argued "These films were all decent, honourable attempts to make something of quality, and most of them succeeded... But United British Artists couldn’t make it work financially – it lacked a backer with deep pockets to ride through the rough times (the late 1980s was a particularly rough time for the British film industry) – and the company eventually wound up."

As an actor only, he was in Lady Jane (1986), Dempsey and Makepeace, Murder, She Wrote, A Man for All Seasons (1988) with Heston, Voice of the Heart (1989), Treasure Island (1990) with Heston as Squire Trelawney, The Secret Life of Ian Fleming (1990), Made in Heaven, Diving In (1990), Duel of Hearts (1991), The Crucifer of Blood (1991) with Heston as Sherlock Holmes and Johnson as Dr. Watson, The Camomile Lawn (1992), and Anglo-Saxon Attitudes (1992). According to one reviewer, his performance in Anglo Saxon earned him "a sheaf of golden notices and put him at the top of the ratings for mature heart-throbs. The key attraction was his effortless screen technique in saying so little yet conveying so much. There was much virtuoso eyebrow work and a wonderful use of the crinkled tissue around the eyes." He did Antony and Cleopatra on stage again in 1991.

In 1992, Johnson returned to the RSC after a 25-year absence under the direction of Peter Hall, appearing in a production of All's Well that Ends Well. "It would have been nice to be able to afford to go back more often", he said. "Unfortunately, what my agent used to call the 'shit factor' comes into play: the better quality the work, the less the money."

Johnson appeared in Heavy Weather (1995), Kavanagh QC, Murder Most Horrid, Tales from the Crypt, Breaking the Code (1996), The Ruth Rendell Mysteries (1996), Supply & Demand, The Echo, Milk (1999), and Happy Days (2000). He did the original story for A Kind of Hush (1999).

A third divorce and the financial failure of a hotel he co owned meant he needed to work. In a 2000 interview he said "Now I'm constantly worried where the next job is coming from. At least at my age the opposition gets less and less because they keep dying."

=== Later career ===
Johnson's later career appearances included doing The Seagull at Stratford in 2000, plus The Whistle-Blower (2001), Lara Croft: Tomb Raider (2001), The Royal, The Robinsons, Whatever Love Means (2005) as Louis Mountbatten, 1st Earl Mountbatten of Burma, Wallis & Edward (2005) (as Stanley Baldwin), Rebus, Scoop (2006), Doc Martin, Midsomer Murders, Waking the Dead, The Raven (2007), Two Families (2007), and Jump! (2008) (which he also helped produce).

From 2007, he led the cast of the BBC's radio comedy series Bleak Expectations which ran until 2012. He also had a successful stage show with a revival of On Golden Pond.

Film-wise he was in The Boy in the Striped Pajamas (2008), Spooks, Lewis, The Bleak Old Shop of Stuff (2011), and Silent Witness. He had a good role in Radiator (2015), saying "Right from the off I felt it was a superior piece of writing for the screen."

His final role was in The Man Who Knew Infinity (2015).

== Other work ==
Throughout his career Johnson continued to teach young actors and students. He toured American universities and taught summer schools at the Royal Academy of Dramatic Art (RADA). He was appointed to the Council of RADA in 2000, and served as a Council Member of the British Academy of Film and Television Arts (BAFTA) in the 1970s. Johnson wrote the original story for the 1975 thriller, Hennessy.

As well as founding the British production company United British Artists (UBA) in 1981, he also served as the company's CEO until 1990, when he resigned in order to resume his acting career. During his tenure at UBA he produced the films Turtle Diary (starring Glenda Jackson and Ben Kingsley, with a screenplay commissioned from Harold Pinter), and The Lonely Passion of Judith Hearne. In London, he produced Pinter's Old Times, a revival of Serjeant Musgrave's Dance (Old Vic), and for theatre and television, the docudrama Biko, about the death of Stephen Biko.

Johnson wrote travel articles regularly for the London mass-circulation newspaper The Mail on Sunday. He kept a blog and teaching website called The Shakespeare Masterclass.

== Personal life ==
By his first marriage, to Sheila Sweet, Johnson had two children, tabletop games designer son Jervis Johnson (b. 1959) and a daughter. His second wife was American actress Kim Novak, with whom he appeared in the film The Amorous Adventures of Moll Flanders (1965); the marriage did not last long but they remained on friendly terms after the divorce. He also had another daughter by his third wife, Marie-Louise Norlund, and a fourth child, a son, by Françoise Pascal. Johnson then married Lynne Gurney on a beach in Goa, India, in 1989, following this with a discreet civil wedding at Kings Road, Chelsea, in 2004.

Johnson was the founder of It's a Green Green World, a global listing of environmentally friendly hotels.

Johnson died in 2015, aged 87, after a short illness at the Royal Marsden Hospital in Chelsea, London.

== Filmography ==
=== Film ===
Year	Title	Role	Notes	Ref.
1951	Captain Horatio Hornblower	Macrae	Uncredited	
1951	Calling Bulldog Drummond	Control Tower Operator	Uncredited	
1952	Lady in the Fog	Danny McMara		
1953	Saadia	Lieutenant Girard		
1959	Never So Few	Captain Danny De Mortimer		
1963	Cairo	Ali		
1963	80,000 Suspects	Dr. Steven Monks		
1963	The Haunting	Dr. John Markway		
1964	The Pumpkin Eater	Giles		
1964	L'autre femme	Daniel		
1965	Operation Crossbow	Duncan Sandys		
1965	The Amorous Adventures of Moll Flanders	Jemmy		
1966	Khartoum	Col. John Stewart		
1966	La strega in amore	Sergio Logan		
1967	Deadlier Than the Male	Hugh Drummond		
1967	The Rover	Real		
1967	Danger Route	Jonas Wilde		
1968	Oedipus the King	Creon		
1968	A Twist of Sand	Geoffrey Peace		
1968	The Column	Tiberius		
1968	Emma Hamilton	Horatio Nelson		
1969	Some Girls Do	Hugh Drummond		
1970	Julius Caesar	Caius Cassius		
1970	The Fifth Day of Peace	Captain Miller		
1971	The Beloved	Orestes		
1972	Antony and Cleopatra	Lepidus / Alexas / Ventidias (voices)	Uncredited	
1974	Beyond the Door	Dimitri		
1975	The Cursed Medallion	Michael Williams		
1975	Hennessy	Inspector Hollis		
1976	Aces High	Major Lyle		
1976	The Message	Narrator		
1976	Take All of Me	Richard Lasky		
1978	Across a Crowded Room	Fergus Mariner	Television film	
1978	The Comeback	Macauley		
1979	Island of the Fishmen	Edmund Rackham		
1979	Zombi 2	Dr. Menard		
1979	The Great Alligator River	Prophet Jameson		
1979	A Nightingale Sang in Berkeley Square	Inspector Watford		
1981	The Monster Club	Mr. Busotsky	Segment: "Vampire Story"	
1984	What Waits Below	Ben Gannon		
1985	Turtle Diary	Mr Johnson		
1986	Lady Jane	The Earl of Arundel		
1990	Diving In	Richard Anthony		
1990	Treasure Island	Squire Trelawney		
1999	Milk	John		
2001	Lara Croft: Tomb Raider	Distinguished Gentleman		
2006	Scoop	Mr. Quincy		
2007	Two Families	Don Cataldo		
2007	Jump!	Judge Larcher		
2008	The Boy in the Striped Pyjamas	Grandpa		
2014	Radiator	Leonard		
2015	The Man Who Knew Infinity	Vice Master Trinity College		

=== Television ===
Year	Title	Role	Notes	Ref.
1952	Pride and Prejudice	Mr Wickham	3 episodes	
1953	The Heir of Skipton	John Lord Clifford / Henry Clifford	3 episodes	
1973–74	Moses the Lawgiver	Narrator	Voice	
1974	Antony and Cleopatra	Mark Antony	TV movie	
1975	Churchill's People	Claudius	Episode: “The Lost Island”	
1975	Space: 1999	Lee Russell	Episode: “Matter of Life and Death”	
1978	The Four Feathers	Abou Fatma	TV movie	
1979	Hart to Hart	Alex Constantine	Episode: "With This Gun, I Thee Wed"	
1980	Tales of the Unexpected	Dr James Carpenter	Episode: “Back for Christmas”	
1981	Tales of the Unexpected	Archaeologist, Tanner	Episode: “Would You Believe It?”	
1981	Magnum, P.I.	Alistair Folkes	Episode: “No Need to Know”	
1981–82	The Kenny Everett Television Show	Various	3 episodes	
1982	Tales of the Unexpected	Parnell	Episode: “Who's Got the Lady?”	
1983	Magnum, P.I.	Alistair Folkes	Episode: “Faith and Begorrah”	
1986	Dempsey and Makepeace	Daish	Episode: “Guardian Angel”	
1987	Murder, She Wrote	Lord Geoffrey Constable	Episode: “It Runs in the Family”	
1988	A Man for All Seasons	Duke of Norfolk	TV movie	
1992	The Camomile Lawn	Oliver (older)	1 episode	
1992	Anglo-Saxon Attitudes	Gerald Middleton	3 episodes	
1996	Murder Most Horrid	Rev. Charles Quentin	Episode: "The Body Politic"	
1999	Midsomer Murders	James Fitzroy	Episode: “Death of a Stranger”	
2000	Rederiet	Norman Burton	2 episodes	
2004–06	Doc Martin	Colonel Gilbert Spencer	2 episodes	
2005	The Robinsons	Hector Robinson	6 episodes	
2007	Midsomer Murders	Rex Masters	Episode: “The Animal Within”	
2007	Waking The Dead	Dr. Raymond Parke	Episode: “Double Bind”	
2008	Spooks	Bernard Qualtrough	4 episodes, released as MI-5 in USA	
2013	Silent Witness	Sir William Embleton	Episode: "Legacy" Pts. 1 & 2	
