= Across a Crowded Room (TV play) =

1978 TV play by Philip Mackie

- Written by: Philip Mackie
- Directed by: Marc Miller
- Starring: Elliott Cooper; Judi Maynard; Peggy Ann Wood; Glynis Johns; Richard Johnson; Charles Gray; Peter Sallis
- Country of origin: England

Production
- Production location: London
- Running time: 52 Minutes
- Production company: ITV Yorkshire

Original release
- Network: ITV Yorkshire
- Release: 26 March 1978

Across a Crowded Room is a 1978 TV play starring Elliott Cooper, Judi Maynard, Peggy Ann Wood, Glynis Jones, Richard Johnson, Charles Gray and Peter Sallis as a group of people working for the West End theatre. The play was produced and broadcast by ITV Yorkshire on the 26 March 1978.

== Plot ==
A group of people working for the West End theatre are about to start a new show but Freddie Churton and Pure who work for the group are so egotistical stars, but they soon develop a grand passion which threatens to disrupt the new show that Cyril Smallpiece is working on.

== Cast ==
- Elliott Cooper as Freddie Churton
- Judi Maynard as Prue
- Peggy Ann Wood as Millie
- Glynis Jones as Julia Saint
- Richard Johnson as Fergus Mariner
- Charles Gray as Harold Charles
- Peter Sallis as Cyril Smallpiece

== Production ==
The concept idea for Across a Crowded Room first came along in 1976 with the first draft script for this TV play first being worked on by Philip Mackie from 1976-1977. Peter Willes, Brenda Loader and Marc Miller (all from Yorkshire TV) worked together to make script changes and revisions to make sure the script would translate well to a TV play.

== Reception ==
Across a Crowded Room was also said to be an episode of the 1978 tv series A Play For Love, although it's more viewed as a TV Movie rather than an episode of a series. The TV Movie itself received great positive feedback from both critics and audiences. Across a Crowded Room has unfortunately like many other old TV Movies around this time period has not been released on DVD or any other home media platforms, although the TV Movie is available to watch at the British Film Institute.
