= Lizzie the Lizard =

Children's TV show

Lizzie the Lizard was a British children's television show airing from 1989 to 1991 on ITV. Four series were commissioned. Half of the series featured Lizzie and her pals (Patrick the Pig and Geoffrey the Donkey) discovering an item and then researching it. The other half featured the gang's normal life in school, at home, and in the forest. Each series featured 20 episodes. There was one Christmas special in 1990.

== Characters ==
Other characters included Lizard Lady's Man John, who fancied Lizzie; Lizard Sister Catherine, who was older and was obsessed with clothes and boys; and Lizard Mum Mary, who loved knitting and was blind.

In Series 2, Jumping, Jackie the Lion was a dance teacher at the school and often tried the gang out with endless exercises. In the episode, the gang tied her up and threw green slime on her. She was then seen again in series 3 in the school panto as a princess, but she fell off stage and went into hospital.

In Series 3, the grumpy old horse teacher, Mr. Nay, becomes a regular character. He often fell asleep and was very stupid. He last appeared in the final episode when Lizzie and her friends received invites to a disco, but they bunked to school to research what it was. They returned, and Mr Nay tried to stop them from coming, but John persuaded him to let them in. John and Lizzie also shared their first dance in the episode.

In Series 4, a batty old owl was introduced for five episodes (episodes 1–5), who used to try to kidnap Patrick the Pig and make him Pig Soup. In Episode 5, she is finally arrested and put in prison. After the gang investigated what the police were, they contacted them.

== Songs ==
It included repeated songs every episode (The Morning Boogie and What's A) and a new song featuring at the end of each episode.

== Final episode ==
In the final episode, Lizzie and her pals leave school and say goodbye to each other one final time, and Lizzie prepares to move house away from her friends. John stops the boat in time and declares his love for Lizzie. In the end, the two finally marry and are seen with baby lizards a few months later. It ends with a song reflecting the true message of the show, which is that everything will be alright if you have good friends. The final image is of the cast walking off into the sunset.
