= Costas Taktsis =

Greek writer (1927–1988)

- Born: 8 October 1927; Thessaloniki, Greece
- Died: 25 August 1988 (aged 60); Athens, Greece
- Education: Law School, University of Athens
- Occupations: Novelist, poet, translator, editor
- Writing career
- Notable work: The Third Wedding

Costas Taktsis (Greek: Κώστας Ταχτσής [ˈkostas taxˈtsis]; 8 October 1927 – 25 August 1988) was a Greek writer. Described as a "landmark of post-war literature in Greece", Taktsis wrote The Third Wedding (Greek: Το τρίτο στεφάνι, romanized: To tríto stefáni) partly in Australia. The book unfolds in the years before and after World War II through the flowing personal narrative of two women: Ekavi and Nina, who speak in a direct and everyday language about what they live through. Unable to find a publisher in Greece he published it at his own expense in 1962. The book has been translated into 18 languages. The French edition was released by Éditions Gallimard in 1967, translated by Jacques Lacarrière. In 1969 it became the first Greek novel published by Penguin Books. A new English translation by John Chioles, was published as The Third Wedding Wreath, by Hermes in 1985.

Many directors including Michael Cacoyannis unsuccessfully tried to produce a film based on the book. Greek broadcaster ANT1 TV produced a television series based on the book in 1995 with Nena Menti in the role of Nina and Lida Protopsalti as Ekavi. A 4-hour adaption for the theatre, directed by Stamatis Fassoulis was produced by the National Theatre of Greece in 2009–2010.

Multi-lingual, he also translated ancient Greek drama, mainly Aristophanes' comedies (The Frogs, The Clouds, The Birds (play), Lysistrata), as well as foreign literature. Together with Nanos Valaoritis and others he participated in the editorial team of the pioneering literary magazine Pali (1964–1967). One theme that is ubiquitous in Taktsis's later texts is homosexuality, which he sometimes accepts and sometimes sees as a permanent curse.

== Biography ==
Costas Taktsís' father, Grigórios, and his mother Eli were from Eastern Rumelia, a region of Thrace now part of Bulgaria. At the age of seven, after the separation from his parents, young Costas was sent to Athens to live with his grandmother. At the end of high school, he enrolled at the Athens Law School, but would never finish his studies.

In 1947, he was called up for military service, and in 1951 he was hired as assistant to the American director of the Louros dam project. From the beginning of 1954 to 1964, he travelled and lived in Australia where he was befriended by the Australian modernist painter Carl Plate, various Western European countries, Africa and the United States, practicing various trades, from seafarer to sous-chef in a restaurant. When he returned to Greece, he tried to survive as a tour guide, translator and finally as a professional writer. During the period of the Greek junta (1967–1974), he had several encounters with the police. A homosexual, he advocated for gay rights and denounced their repression and marginalization.

On August 25, 1988, he was discovered by his sister, strangled at his home in Kolonos. This crime has never been solved.

== Work ==
Taktsís appeared in Greek literature in the early 1950s with his collections of poems: Δέκα ποιήματα (Ten Poems), Μικρά ποιήματα (Little Poems) and Περί ώραν δωδεκάτην (Towards the Twelfth Hour), which he later disavowed. Two other collections followed: Συμφωνία του “Μπραζίλιαν” (The Symphony of the Brazilian) (1954) and Καφενείο “Το Βυζάντιο” (Café Byzantium) (1956).

In 1962 he published his novel Το τρίτο στεφάνι (The Third Wedding), which brought him international acclaim after it was translated into French as Le troisième anneau by Jacques Lacarrière and published by Gallimard in 1967 and then into English by John Chioles. With Nanos Valaoritis and others, he was part of the editorial team of the avant-garde literary magazine Pali (1964-1967). In 1972, he published the collection of short stories Τα ρέστα (Small Change), and in 1979 a series of autobiographical stories under the title Η γιαγιά μου η Αθήνα (My grandmother Athens).

== Bibliography ==
- Poems (poetry collection) 1951
- Small Poems (poetry collection) 1952
- About Twelve O'Clock (poetry collection) 1953
- Symphony of the Brazilian (poetry collection) 1954
- Café Byzantium and Other Poems (poetry collection) 1956
- The Third Wedding (novel) 1962
- The Editions or the Rest (short story collection) 1972
- My Grandmother Athens (autobiographical collection) 1979
- The Terrible Step (unfinished autobiography) 1989
- From a Low Point of View 1992
- Sorry, Aren't you Mr. Taktsis? 1996
- Notebook of Constantine Grig. Taktsis 1996
- A Greek Dragon in London 2002
