= House Gift =

British lifestyle game show television series

- Logo from the opening titles.
- Starring: Laurence Llewellyn-Bowen; Philip Chklar; Stephen Collins; Anita Kaushal; Tom Keane; Gillian Anderson-Price; Danielle Proud
- Narrated by: Pip Torrens
- Country of origin: United Kingdom
- Original language: English
- No. of series: 4
- No. of episodes: 56

Production
- Running time: 60 minutes (including advertisements)
- Production company: ITV Studios

Original release
- Network: ITV
- Release: 31 August 2009 – 18 March 2011

Related
- 60 Minute Makeover; Come Dine with Me; House Guest; How Not to Decorate

House Gift is a lifestyle game show created by ITV.

== Show overview ==
Three interior designers set out to find the perfect gift for a house. The gift they'll choose must complement the home, and also appeal to the homeowner's tastes. Each designers must buy an item in four hours with different amounts of money: one getting £200, one getting £500 and one getting £1,000. The homeowners at the end of the show must pick one of the three gifts chosen by the designers, having no idea how much the items cost. In early series, the amounts were slightly different, with the lowest being £80, the middle amount being £300 and the highest being £1,000.

== Interior designers ==
Three designers try to impress the homeowner each day. Laurence Llewelyn-Bowen is always one of the designers, along with an antiques expert and another female designer, usually Danielle Proud.

A list of interior designers who appear listed in order of frequency:

Designers	Appearances
Laurence Llewelyn-Bowen	Everyday
Tom Keane	Often
Danielle Proud	often
Gillian Anderson-Price	Occasionally
Philip Chklar	Occasionally
Stephen Collins	Occasionally
Anita Kaushal	Occasionally

== Transmissions ==
=== Original series ===
Series	Start date	End date	Episodes
1	31 August 2009	4 September 2009	5
2	25 January 2010	12 February 2010	15
3	29 November 2010	17 December 2010	15
4	21 February 2011	18 March 2011	20

=== Special ===
Date	Entitle
20 December 2010	Christmas special
