= Minos Argyrakis =

Greek painter, sketcher and scenic designer

Minos Argyrakis (Aydın, 1919 – Athens, 26 May 1998) was a Greek painter, sketcher and scenic designer.

== Biography ==
He was born in Aydin in 1919. His parents indicated the place of birth as Smyrna and the year as 1920.

He studied at Psychiko College under the guidance of Penelope Delta. He tried twice to be accepted by Athens School of Fine Arts, but unsuccessfully. Then he turned to the Higher School of Commerce (today's Athens University of Economics). During the Occupation period, he joined United Panhellenic Organization of Youth. In 1948 and 1951, he participated in the Panhellenic painting exhibitions. At the same time, he published texts and sketches in newspapers and magazines of the time (Greek Creation, Avgi). He was a member of the artistic group "Armos" from 1949 to 1953 (the year Armos ceased its activity).

== Bibliography ==
- Minos Argyrakis, Οδός Ονείρων, ίδια έκδοση, 1957. Επανέκδοση: Εκδ. Δέκα, Αθήνα, αγνώστου ημερομηνίας.
- Minos Argyrakis, Ο γύρος του Κόσμου, εκδ. Γαλαξία, Αθήνα, 1964.
- Minos Argyrakis, Η Πολιτεία Έπλεε εις την Μελανόλευκον, εκδ. Θεμέλιο, Αθήνα, 1963
- Minos Argyrakis, Travelling in Greece, Kastaniotis Publications, Αθήνα 1984.
- Konstantinos Papachristou, 'Minos Argyrakis: an unknown side of his. His techno-criticism in the magazine 'Greek Creation'". Chrisanthos Christou, Tribute, Aristotle University of Thessaloniki, p. 239-243, Thessaloniki, 2006.
