= Kate Robbins =

English actress, singer-songwriter (born 1958)

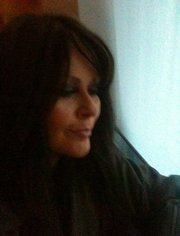
- Robbins, 2011
- Born: 21 August 1958 (age 68); Margate, Kent, England
- Occupations: Actress; comedian; singer; songwriter; director
- Years active: 1978–present
- Spouse: Keith Atack (m. 1987; div. 2007)
- Children: 3, including Emily Atack
- Relatives: Ted Robbins (grandfather); Ted Robbins (brother); Amy Robbins (sister); Paul McCartney (first cousin once removed)
- Musical career
- Genres: Pop; electronica
- Occupations: Actress; musician; comedian; singer
- Instruments: Vocals; piano; keyboards
- Years active: 1978–present
- Labels: Anchor; Ariola; RCA; Bright; Double Art; International Artists
- Website: katerobbins.co.uk

Kate Elizabeth Robbins (born 21 August 1958) is an English actress, director, singer, and songwriter. She scored a top ten single on the UK Official Charts with "More Than in Love", while she was appearing in the television soap opera Crossroads (1980–1981). She also represented the UK in the 1980 Eurovision Song Contest as a member of the group Prima Donna; they finished third, singing "Love Enough for Two". Robbins went on to become a prolific voice comedy actress, most notably for ten years with the satirical show Spitting Image (1986–1996).

== Early life ==
Robbins is the elder sister of fellow actress Amy Robbins, sculptor Jane Robbins, and The Sheilas singer Emma Robbins. Her older brother is radio broadcaster and actor Ted Robbins. Through her sister Emma, she became the sister-in-law of Simon Shelton, and through her sister Amy, the sister-in-law of actor Robert Daws. Her father was Mike Robbins, who grew up in Hightown, Wrexham, the son of Ted Robbins, who served as the secretary of the Football Association of Wales for more than 35 years.

Robbins is a first cousin once removed of Paul McCartney, as her mother Elizabeth "Bett" Robbins (née Danher) was McCartney's cousin. In 1960, McCartney and John Lennon performed as "The Nerk Twins" at the Fox and Hounds pub in Caversham, Reading, which was run by Robbins' parents Bett and Mike.

Robbins grew up on the Wirral Peninsula, where she attended Wirral Grammar School for Girls.

== Career ==
=== Singing ===
Robbins' first released recording, in 1978, was the song "Tomorrow", from the musical Annie. Robbins' first chart appearance was as a backing singer, along with her sister Jane, on the minor Top 40 hit "Lines" by Liverpool group Planets, a spin-off from Deaf School. In 1980 she and Jane represented the United Kingdom in the Eurovision Song Contest as part of the group Prima Donna; they finished third singing the UK entry "Love Enough for Two".

The following year, Robbins joined the cast of the ITV soap opera Crossroads, playing the part of a pop singer who was recording a single in the fictional motel's basement recording studio. The song, "More Than in Love", was released commercially in the UK, credited as Kate Robbins and Beyond and gave Robbins a major hit single, reaching number 2 in the UK Singles Chart.

Robbins also sung the vocals to the credits of the final episode of The Young Ones.

Robbins wrote the first theme tune to Surprise, Surprise performed by Cilla Black. She sang the lead vocals on "The Chicken Song" with Michael Fenton Stevens, which reached number 1 in 1986.

In December 2010, Robbins released her third album, Soho Nights. She co-wrote the easy listening album We're Just Passing Through, with broadcaster and journalist Nicky Campbell, which was released in 2014.

=== Television and film ===
Robbins provided female voices on the television show Spitting Image from series 3 to series 20 (1986–1996).

She played Cilla Black in Harry Enfield's Television Programme (1992), and voiced Princess Anne in Drop the Dead Donkey in 1993.

In 1995, Robbins provided all of the voices, including the male ones, in the children's television series The Caribou Kitchen. The 1986 Granada Television sketch show Robbins featured Kate, her brother Ted Robbins, and her sisters Amy Robbins, Jane Robbins and Emma Robbins.

Robbins was named "Best Supporting Actress" at the Angel Awards of the Monaco International Film Festival in 2006, for her role as Kathleen in the low-budget British film Fated (2005). She played Joan in Sex Lives of the Potato Men (2004). The following year, she appeared with James Franco and Jean Reno in the film Flyboys, playing the role of Clarisse, a brothel Madame.

She also starred in Farrena Films' comedy-thriller short movie The Other Side with Valerie Hope, and played Babs in two series of the comedy series dinnerladies. Robbins later appeared with the sitcom's writer Victoria Wood in the Christmas special Victoria Wood with All the Trimmings, and Victoria Wood's Big Fat Documentary. Alongside daughter Emily Atack, Robbins appeared is a regular contributor on Channel 4's Steph's Packed Lunch, and appeared in Celebrity Gogglebox in 2024.

=== Radio ===
During the 1990s, Robbins performed a number of different roles as both an impersonator and a singer in the BBC Radio 4 satirical comedy series A Look Back at the Nineties and its sequel A Look Back at the Future. Robbins took part in the original BBC Radio 4 series of Dead Ringers in 2000.

=== Live comedy ===
Robbins was part of the Grumpy Old Women Live tours in 2014 and 2015.

== Honours ==
In 2007, Robbins was awarded an honorary Bachelor of Arts degree from the University of Bedfordshire, for her lifetime contribution to performing arts.

== Personal life ==
Robbins divorced musician Keith Atack in 2007, after 19 years of marriage together. Robbins and Atack had three children: actress Emily (born 1989), Martha (born 1991), and George (born 1992).

== Filmography ==
=== Film ===
| Year | Title | Role | Notes |
|---|---|---|---|
| 1990 | Bullseye! | The Queen (voice) | |
| 1995 | The Band Parts | Blossom | Short films |
| 2000 | Ogri | Mitzi (voice) | Short films |
| 2003 | 16 Years of Alcohol | Fighting Couple Woman | |
| 2004 | Sex Lives of the Potato Men | Joan | |
| 2004 | Boo, Zino & the Snurks | Female Gayan / Valerie (voice) | English version |
| 2005 | MirrorMask | Female Giant / Mrs. Shoe-Thing / Chicken | |
| 2006 | Flyboys | Clarise | |
| 2006 | Fated | Kathleen | |
| 2017 | The Legend of Kung Funk | Natalie | Short films |
| 2018 | The Other Side with Valerie Hope | Valerie Hope | Short films |
| 2022 | Road Trip | Mother | Short films |
| 2022 | A Last Resort | Rose | Short films |
| 2022 | Dead on the Vine | Eva | |
| 2024 | Clown | Taxi Woman | Short film |
| 2024 | Restless | Jackie | |
| 2025 | Egg Timer | Sandra | Short film |
| TBA | Blueberry Inn | Leanne | In production |

=== Television ===
| Year | Title | Role | Notes |
|---|---|---|---|
| 1980–1981 | Crossroads: Kings Oak | Kate Loring | 11 episodes |
| 1982 | Mike Yarwood in Persons | Impressionist (various) | 1 episode |
| 1986 | Saturday Live | Cilla Black, Sarah Ferguson | Recurring roles (3 episodes) |
| 1986–1996 | Spitting Image | Various (voice) | Regular roles (Series 3–18; 93 episodes) |
| 1987 | Spitting Image: The Ronnie and Nancy Show | Nancy Reagan (voice) | Television film |
| 1987 | Kate and Ted's Show | Various characters | Regular roles (7 episodes) |
| 1988 | The Kate Robbins Show | Various characters | Regular roles (6 episodes) |
| 1989–1990 | Round the Bend! | Jemimah Wellington-Green / Various (voice) | Regular roles (Series 1–3; 18 episodes) |
| 1989–1991 | The Staggering Stories of Ferdinand de Bargos | Various (voice) | Series 1–3; 11 episodes |
| 1990 | Wicked Willie | Voice role | Television film |
| 1991 | Wicked Willie Rides Again! | Voice role | Video film |
| 1992 | Fiddley Foodle Bird | Voice role | 13 episodes |
| 1992 | Pallas | Voice role | Series 2; episode 3: "Pallas 2" |
| 1992 | Red Dwarf | Woman in Film (voice) | Series 5; episode 1: "Holoship" (uncredited role) |
| 1992 | Harry Enfield's Television Programme | Cilla Black | Series 2; episode 3 |
| 1992 | Sean's Show | Cilla Black | Series 1; episode 6: "Blind Date" |
| 1992 | My Little Pony Tales | Additional voices | Episode 15: "Princess Problems" |
| 1993 | Comedy Playhouse | Bella White | Episode 5: "Once in a Lifetime" |
| 1993 | The Comic Strip Presents... | Nurse Larkin | Series 7; episode 4: "Gregory: Diary of a Nutcase" |
| 1993 | Dizzy Heights | Madame Visniskaye | Series 4; episode 1: "A Star Is Bored" |
| 1993 | KYTV | Truddles | Series 3; episode 2: "Those Sexciting '60s" |
| 1993 | Thatcherworld | Voice role | Television film |
| 1993 | Last of the Summer Wine | Gypsy Girl | Series 15; episode 8: "There Are Gypsies at the Bottom of Our Garden" |
| 1993 | Drop the Dead Donkey | Princess Anne (voice) | Series 3, episode 11: "Awards" |
| 1993–2001 | Numbertime | Mama (voice) | Regular role (Series 1–9; 68 episodes) |
| 1995–1997 | The Caribou Kitchen | Narrator / All character voices | Regular role (Series 1–4; 52 episodes) |
| 1996 | Jack and Jeremy's Real Lives | Pam Ayres (voice) | Episode 2: "Writers" |
| 1996 | Drop the Dead Donkey | Sarah, Duchess of York (voice) | Series 5, episode 6: "George's Car" |
| 1996 | The Willows in Winter | Voice role | Television film |
| 1996 | Bamboo Bears | Ai-Ai (voice) | English dub |
| 1996 | Bimble's Bucket | Voice role | Series 1; episode 1: "The Beginning" |
| 1997 | Alas Smith & Jones | Various roles | Series 9; episode 4: "Hookers." |
| 1997 | Animal Madness | Various roles | Television film |
| 1998 | Archibald the Koala | Voice role | Episode 1: "The Dragon" |
| 1998 | The National Lottery Big Ticket | Bernie (voice) | Regular role (16 episodes) |
| 1998 | You Are Here | Rita Cohen | Television film |
| 1998–1999 | Dinnerladies | Babs | Series 1; episode 5: "Party" and series 2; episode 3: "Holidays" |
| 1999 | Mimi and Mr. Bobo | Voice role | 1 episode |
| 1999–2000 | The Big Knights | Sorceress Abigail / Aunt Iris (voices) | Regular roles (13 episodes) |
| 2000 | The 10th Kingdom | Singing Ring (voice) | Recurring roles (2 episodes) |
| 2000 | Where the Heart Is | Angela Taylor | Series 4, episode 9: "A Good Day" |
| 2001 | Where the Heart Is | Beverley Garton | Series 5, episode 11: "Temptation" |
| 2001–2003 | El Nombre | Mama (voice) | Regular role (Series 1 & 2; 26 episodes) |
| 2002 | Phoenix Nights | Ladies Night Organiser | Series 2; episode 5: "Ladies' Night" |
| 2002 | Holby City | Leslie Harris | Series 4, episode 42: "Design for Living" |
| 2003–2005 | Monkey Dust | Various characters | Series 1–3; 18 episodes |
| 2004 | The Impressionable Jon Culshaw | Various characters | 4 episodes |
| 2004 | Doctors | Sheila Lovatt | Series 6, episode 46: "Wild, Wild West Midlands" |
| 2006 | Heartbeat | Sheryl Cooper | Series 15; episode 21: "Wine and Roses" |
| 2007 | Touch Me, I'm Karen Taylor | Prime Minister's Aide | Recurring role (Series 1; 4 episodes) |
| 2008 | Doctors | Marylin Harvey | Series 10, episode 19: "The Hex" |
| 2008 | Ruddy Hell! It's Harry and Paul | Various roles | Series 2; episode 5 |
| 2009 | Casualty | Jackie | Series 23; episode 43: "Not Over 'Til the Fat Lady Sings" |
| 2009 | The Legend of Dick and Dom | Baroness Clap | Series 1, episode 6: "Hairwolf" |
| 2010 | The Legend of Dick and Dom | Dana | Series 2, episode 9: "Haunted" |
| 2011 | In with the Flynns | Jackie | Series 1; episode 5: "Guitar" |
| 2011 | The Slammer | Blue Fairy | Series 4; episode 10: "Angry Puppet" |
| 2012 | Ben & Holly's Little Kingdom | Miss Jolly (voice) | Series 2; episodes 19 & 33: "Mrs. Witch's Spring Clean" and "The Dwarf Mine" |
| 2014 | Citizen Khan | Nail Bar Technician | Series 3; episode 5: "Stags and Hens" |
| 2017 | Holby City | Stella Clark | Series 19, episode 16: "Daylight" |
| 2017 | Haters Back Off! | Nurse #2 | Series 2; episode 4: "Modelling at the Hospital" |
| 2019 | Hold the Sunset | Mrs. Brown | Series 2; episode 1: "The Sale" |
| 2020–2022 | The Emily Atack Show | Various characters | Series 1–3; 4 episodes |
| 2021 | EastEnders | Jen Glover | Recurring role (5 episodes) |
| 2022 | Mandy | Joan MacDonald | Series 2; episode 3: "Holiday for One" |
| 2022 | After Life | Penny Spencer-Wright | Recurring role (Series 3; 3 episodes) |
| 2022 | The Walk-In | Robbie's Mum | Episode 1 |
| 2022 | It's What She Would Have Wanted | Annie's Mum | Television film |
| 2022 | Midsomer Murders | Lyra Kaine | Series 23; episode 1: "The Blacktrees Prophecy" |
| 2023 | Silent Witness | Bev | Series 26; episode 4: "Familiar Faces - Part 2" |
| 2023 | The Couple Next Door | Jean | Series 1; 6 episodes |
| 2023 | The Good Ship Murder | Vida Devine | Episode 8: "Malta" |
| 2023–present | Unforgotten | Kate | Series 5 & 6; 9 episodes |
| 2024 | Death in Paradise | Lucky Clayborn | Series 13, episode 3 |
| 2024 | Doctors | Barbara Hill | Series 24, episode 200: "Dead Woman Talking" |
| 2024 | Whitstable Pearl | Janet | Series 3; episode 4: "Prisoners of the Past" |
| 2025 | Sister Boniface Mysteries | Sister Laurence | Series 4; episode 8: “The Happiest Family” |
| 2025 | Brassic | Mrs. Waif | Series 7; episode 3: “School Reunion” |
| 2025 | Three Wisest Men | Older Woman | Television film |
| 2026 | Rivals | Patricia Banks | Series 2; 2 episodes |
| TBA | California Avenue | Priscilla Pinnock | TBA |

== Theatre ==
| Year | Title | Role | Notes |
|---|---|---|---|
| 2008 | Songs from the Pool | Various | Gilded Balloon (Edinburgh Fringe) |
| 2014 | Grumpy Old Women | Grumpy Old Woman | UK Tour |
| 2015 | Grumpy Old Women | Grumpy Old Woman | UK Tour |
| 2019 | Club Tropicana | Consuela | UK Tour |

== Radio ==
| Year | Title | Role | Notes |
|---|---|---|---|
| 2000 | Dead Ringers | Various | 2 episodes (BBC Radio 4) |

== Voices ==
- 1993 The Beano Video - Neighbour's Wife
- 1994 The Beano VideoStars - Various characters
- 1995 Discworld (Video game) - Various characters
- 1996 Discworld II: Missing Presumed...!? (Video game) - Various characters
- 1999 Discworld Noir (Video game) - Various characters

== UK discography ==
=== Singles ===
- 1978 "Tomorrow" (Anchor)
- 1980 "Love Enough for Two" (Ariola) (with Prima Donna) UK No. 48
- 1980 "Just Got to be You" (Ariola) (with Prima Donna)
- 1981 "More Than in Love (RCA) UK No. 2
- 1981 "I Want You Back" (RCA)
- 1981 "Run Wild" (RCA)
- 1983 "The Real Me" (RCA)
- 1983 "That First Love"
- 1986 "The Chicken Song" (Lead female vocal)
- 1988 "If You Wanna Help Somebody"

=== Albums ===
- 1981 Kate Robbins (RCA)
- 2008 Songs from the Pool
- 2010 Soho Nights
- 2014 We're Just Passing Through (Long Lunch Music)
