= The Keith & Paddy Picture Show =

British ITV comedy parody series (2017–2018)

- Promotional Poster
- Genre: Parody
- Written by: Dan Johnston; Jamie Deeks; Leigh Francis; Paddy McGuinness
- Directed by: Dan Johnston; Jamie Deeks
- Starring: Keith Lemon; Paddy McGuinness
- Country of origin: United Kingdom
- Original language: English
- No. of series: 2
- No. of episodes: 11

Production
- Executive producers: Leigh Francis; Paddy McGuinness
- Producers: Dan Johnston; Jamie Deeks
- Production location: United Kingdom
- Editors: Justin James; Nigel Williams
- Camera setup: Multi camera
- Running time: 30 minutes
- Production company: Talkback

Original release
- Network: ITV
- Release: 6 May 2017 – 24 December 2018

The Keith and Paddy Picture Show is a British comedy parody series, written by and starring Leigh Francis (as Keith Lemon) and Paddy McGuinness, first broadcast on ITV on 6 May 2017. The series is billed as a "comedic tribute" to some of Lemon and McGuinness's favourite films. Each week they attempt to recreate an iconic film, with the help of a celebrity cast.

== Production ==
The series originated as the result of a semi-regular sketch featured in The Keith Lemon Sketch Show, known as Keith & Paddy's Film Bit, and non-broadcast pilot entitled The Keith and Paddy Show, which was recorded in 2016 and featured a number of celebrity guests and film parody sketches. The series was first announced on 24 November 2016, when ITV announced the commission of a five-episode series, featuring parodies of the films Dirty Dancing, Ghostbusters, Star Wars: Return of the Jedi, Jaws and Rocky. The first series began transmission on 6 May 2017 at 9:15pm.

The first series drew a strong viewing audience for the timeslot. As a result, a second series, extended to six episodes, was confirmed on 11 January 2018. Parodies in this series include Grease, Top Gun, Pretty Woman, Terminator 2: Judgment Day and Jurassic Park. Series two, began broadcasting on 14 April 2018. Five episodes were broadcast over April and May, with the remaining episode, a parody of Gremlins, being broadcast as a Christmas Special on Christmas Eve 2018.

== Episodes ==
=== Transmissions ===
Series	Episodes	First Aired	Last Aired
Series 1	5	6 May 2017	3 June 2017
Series 2	6	14 April 2018	24 December 2018

=== Series 1 (2017) ===
No. overall	No. in series	Title	Original release date	UK viewers (millions)
1	1	"Dirty Dancing"	6 May 2017	5.80
Lemon and McGuinness recreate Dirty Dancing. Starring Jessica Hynes as Marjorie, Larry Lamb as Dr. Houseman, Kimberly Wyatt as Penny, Adam C. Booth as Billy Kosteki / Bib Fortuna, George Potts as Max Kellerman and John Barrowman as himself
2	2	"Ghostbusters"	13 May 2017	4.22
Lemon and McGuinness recreate Ghostbusters. Starring Robbie Williams as Dr. Egon Spengler, Will Mellor as Dr. Egon Spengler (Replacement), Sarah Parish as Dana Barrett, Emily Atack as Slimer, Emma Willis as Janine Melnitz, Gary Wilmot as Winston Zeddmore, Vicki Michelle as the Chambermaid, Chris Kamara as Ray Parker Jr., Paul Denson as Mr. Blobby and Bob Carolgees as himself
3	3	"Star Wars: Return of the Jedi"	20 May 2017	4.18
Lemon and McGuinness recreate Star Wars: Return of the Jedi. Starring Phillip Schofield as Yoda, Ant & Dec as Ewoks, David Dickinson as Emperor Palpatine, Michelle Keegan as Princess Leia, Malcolm Lord as Bungle and Richard Arnold and Jeremy Kyle as Themselves
4	4	"Jaws"	27 May 2017	4.10
Lemon and McGuinness recreate Jaws. Starring Stephen Tompkinson as Quint, Myleene Klass as Chrissie, Hank Osasuna as Mad Paul, Angela Simpson as the Reporter, and Nik & Eva Speakman as Themselves
5	5	"Rocky"	3 June 2017	3.63
Lemon and McGuinness recreate Rocky. Starring Anna Friel as Adrian, Marvin Humes as Apollo Creed, Stefan Kopiecki as the Russian General and Andi Peters as Mr. T

=== Series 2 (2018) ===
No. overall	No. in series	Title	Original release date	UK viewers (millions)
6	1	"Grease"	14 April 2018	4.41
Lemon and McGuinness recreate Grease. Starring Marvin Humes, Emily Atack, Emma Willis, Nicole Scherzinger, Stacey Solomon, Fearne Cotton, Georgia Toffolo and Hunter
7	2	"Top Gun"	21 April 2018	2.99
Lemon and McGuinness recreate Top Gun. Starring Kriss Akabusi as Sundown, Keith Allen as Stinger, Adam C. Booth as Slider, Paul Elliott as Viper, Sarah Parish as Charlie, John Whitby as the Sergeant Major and Marc Warren as Iceman
8	3	"Pretty Woman"	28 April 2018	3.70
Lemon and McGuinness recreate Pretty Woman. Starring Philip Glenister, Amanda Holden, Louise Redknapp, Tracy-Ann Oberman, George Potts and Ainsley Harriott
9	4	"Terminator 2"	12 May 2018	Under 2.92
Lemon and McGuinness recreate Terminator 2: Judgment Day. Starring Jaime Winstone as John Connor, Rick Astley as T1000 and Hank Osasuna
10	5	"Jurassic Park"	19 May 2018	Under 2.66
Lemon and McGuinness recreate Jurassic Park. Starring Sian Gibson, Sally Phillips, George Potts, Shaun Ryder and Bernie Clifton
11	6	"Gremlins"	24 December 2018	N/A
Lemon and McGuinness recreate Gremlins. Starring Zach Galligan, Kara Tointon, John Thomson, Su Pollard, Les Dennis, Arthur Bostrom, Basil Brush, Zippy and Gordon the Gopher
