= The Emily Atack Show series 2 =

The Emily Atack Show
- Series 2
- No. of episodes: 6

Release
- Original network: ITV2
- Original release: 7 October – 11 November 2021

Series chronology
- ← Previous; Series 1 Next → Series 3

The second series of The Emily Atack Show, is a British comedy television series, which began airing on 7 October 2021 and concluded after six episodes on 11 November 2021. The show was renewed for its second series in March 2021 by ITV. The series follows the same premise as the first instalment in 2020, covering Emily Atack's performances at the Clapham Grand with sketches and impressions.

In February 2022, it was announced the show would return for a third series in the same year.

== Cast ==
All cast members are played by themselves.

- Emily Atack
- Ambreen Razia
- Barney Fishwick
- Bryony Twydle
- Cam Spence
- Cole Anderson-James
- Harry Kershaw
- Holli Dempsey
- James McNicholas
- Jarreau Antoine
- Rebecca Rogers
- Rich Keeble
- Shiloh Coke
- Zadeiah Campbell-Davies

== Episodes ==
No. overall	No. in series	Title	Duration	Original release date
7	1	"Dating"	45 minutes	7 October 2021
The Emily Atack Show returns for its second series, with the opening episode focusing on holidays. It covers common dilemmas, from packing to holiday romance, destination weddings and finally camping.
8	2	"Life Lessons"	45 minutes	14 October 2021
Emily talks about life lessons in episode two. She goes back to school, takes an eventful road trip and expects her boyfriend could be cheating. Emily also tells all with a stand up scene about sex education, bunking off school and five times she failed her driving test.
9	3	"Relationships"	45 minutes	21 October 2021
The episode combines comedy sketches, stand-up and impressions covering the theme of relationships. Emily meets a new partner's parents, pitches relationship insurance and meets an old school friend at an inappropriate time.
10	4	"Modern Life"	45 minutes	28 October 2021
All about modern life, poking fun at situations like sending naughty pictures to the wrong person and having an addiction for motivational quotes.
11	5	"Men & Women"	45 minutes	4 November 2021
Emily's comedy sketches cover the theme of men and women. Emily takes revenge on a catcalled and the horrors of when the club lights come on.
12	6	"The Body"	45 minutes	11 November 2021
Stand-up routines explore enduring meditation, rubbish halloween outfits and other terrible fashion choices. The episodes theme is on the subject of the body.
