= The Emily Atack Show series 1 =

The Emily Atack Show
- Series 1
- No. of episodes: 6

Release
- Original network: ITV2
- Original release: 4 November – 9 December 2020

Series chronology
- Next → Series 2

The first series of The Emily Atack Show, is a British comedy television series, which began airing on 4 November 2020 and concluded after six episodes on 9 December 2020. The show follows Emily Atack's performances at the Clapham Grand along with sketches and impressions.

== Cast ==
All cast members are played by themselves.

- Emily Atack
- Ambreen Razia
- Barney Fishwick
- Bryony Twydle
- Cam Spence
- Cole Anderson-James
- Harry Kershaw
- Holli Dempsey
- James McNicholas
- Jarreau Antoine
- Rebecca Rogers
- Rich Keeble
- Shiloh Coke
- Zadeiah Campbell-Davies

== Episodes ==
No. overall	No. in series	Title	Duration	Original release date
1	1	"Dating"	33 minutes	4 November 2020
Emily focuses on the theme of dating throughout the episode, and opens up about her own experiences. From being single to one-night stands, she also shares flirting tips.
2	2	"Going Out"	33 minutes	11 November 2020
This episode's topic is going out. Emily gives the viewers unique tips on the best etiquette for the hens' WhatsApp group and tight friends that never buy a round of drinks, along with the dos and don'ts while on a Bucking Bronco.
3	3	"Family"	33 minutes	18 November 2020
Emily shares details about her family life and her childhood, all while her parents are in the audience. The episode also includes impressions of stars including Stacey Solomon, Holly Willoughby and Keith Lemon.
4	4	"Image"	33 minutes	25 November 2020
The 4th episode of the series focuses on image. How to achieve the perfect, sometimes deceptive, Instagram shot. The good, the bad, and the ugly realities of dieting and Emily's ongoing battle with her nemesis.
5	5	"Friends"	33 minutes	2 December 2020
Emily's audience is made up of the most cherished people in her life, her friends. The episode follows Emily's friends' commentary of her life and why she's the naughty one of the group. Emily doesn't hold her punches either, sharing escapades over their 19 years of friendship.
6	6	"Growing Up"	33 minutes	9 December 2020
The series finale is all about growing up. Emily talks about turning 30, and the struggles of pretending to be an adult. She covers her teens and how in the blink of an eye she is in her 30s, to pretending not to be drunk at a baby shower.
