= 30 Years to Life =

30 Years to Life may refer to:

- 30 Years to Life (1998 film), an American television science-fiction film
- 30 Years to Life (2001 film), an American comedy film
