= Kathryn Flett =

British television critic (born 1964)

- Born: 1 April 1964 (age 62); Watford, Hertfordshire, England
- Occupations: Television critic and author
- Notable credit: Grumpy Old Women
- Parent(s): Patricia (née Jenkins) and Douglas J. Flett

Kathryn Alexandra Flett (born 1 April 1964) is a British television critic, author, and star of the BBC's Grumpy Old Women series.

== Early life ==
Daughter of songwriter Douglas J. Flett and Patricia (née Jenkins), Kathryn Flett was educated at Notting Hill & Ealing High School, and Hammersmith and West London College. When Kathryn was 16 years old, by which time her parents had been divorced for seven years, Flett's mother "flattered [her] into thinking [she] was so grown-up and on top of things that [she] didn't really need any hands-on mothering any more", sending her to live with her father, while her mother returned to her native Australia with the man who would become Flett's stepfather, Arthur. Flett has remained largely estranged from her mother since this time.

== Career ==
Flett began her career as a staff writer for i-D Magazine in 1985. This was followed by a period as features editor and fashion editor of The Face (1987–1989), three years as a freelancer, and then editor of Arena magazine from 1992 to 1995.

In 1995, at the age of 31, Flett joined The Observer as associate editor of the magazine Observer Life, later becoming a features writer and TV critic on the newspaper.

In 1997, Flett's husband of 17 months left her and as the couple were going through a divorce, Flett found an outlet for her grief by writing about the break-up week-by-week in her Observer newspaper column. She published a book about the relationship, The Heart-shaped Bullet (ISBN 0330370383), in 1999. The book was often savagely reviewed, including an infamous stinker in her own paper by psychologist Oliver James; Flett then wrote about this experience in Elle magazine.

Since 2004, Flett has starred in the BBC TV's Grumpy Old Women series and, in 2008, was a judge on Channel 4's Miss Naked Beauty. Her first novel, Separate Lives, was published in 2012 by Quercus Books. Her latest book,Outstanding, was published in 2016 by Quercus.

Flett was given an honorary M.Litt. by the University of Brighton in 2015.

In April 2016, Flett began writing a fortnightly restaurant review column in The Daily Telegraph.

== Sources ==
- Observer biog
- Miss Naked Beauty profile
