= Nobody's Fool (TV series) =

2026 British TV series

- Genre: Reality quiz show
- Presented by: Emily Atack; Danny Dyer
- Country of origin: United Kingdom
- Original language: English
- No. of series: 1
- No. of episodes: 6

Production
- Running time: 48 minutes
- Production company: Lifted Entertainment

Original release
- Network: ITV
- Release: 23 May – 1 June 2026

Nobody's Fool is a British reality television quiz show which was first broadcast on 23 May 2026 on ITV1 and ITVX. It is presented by Danny Dyer and Emily Atack.

== Premise ==
Ten contestants will stay in a "unique and mischievous Smart House" where intelligence is tested. It is described as a "strategic reality quiz".

== Development ==
The show was announced by ITV Studios in August 2025. Nobody’s Fool is the first commission for ITV by the American indie company Nobody’s Hero. The first trailer was released on 2 May 2026. It is presented by Rivals cast members Danny Dyer and Emily Atack.

== Contestants ==
Contestant	Age	Job	Residence	Place
Billy Bowness	55	Clairvoyant	Harrogate, England	6th
Ella Cunningham	21	Hospitality manager	Leeds, England	5th
Harry Kind	33	TV presenter	Carmarthenshire, Wales	Runner-up
Jackie Waring	68	Retired HR manager	Morecambe, England	7th
John Bullard	73	Banker	London, England	8th
Kamaal Busari	25	Financial analyst	London, England	Winner
Melissa Todd	49	Dominatrix	Broadstairs, England	4th
Omar Tinsley	31	Entrepreneur	Benfleet, England	9th
Parissa Kamal	32	Influencer and HR	Crawley, England	10th
Sonja Angelevska	32	Legal project manager	Ipswich, England	3rd
