= Jenny Eclair =

English comedian, novelist, and actress (born 1960)

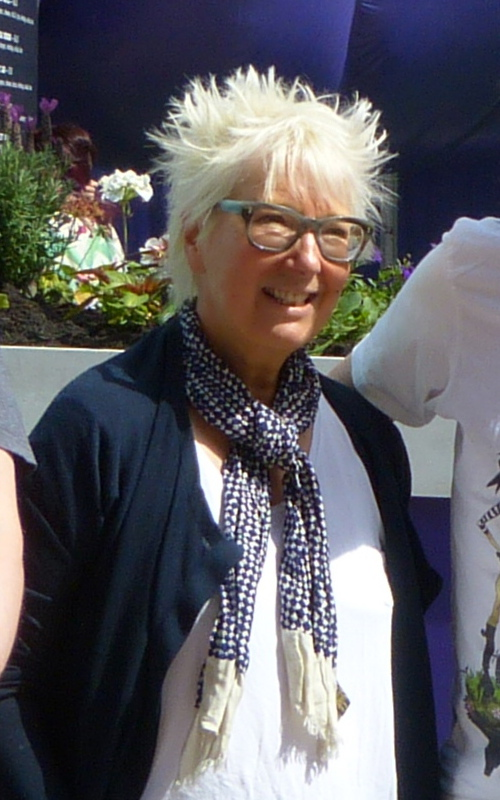
- Eclair in 2013
- Born: Jenny Clare Hargreaves; 1960 (age 65–66); Kuala Lumpur, Federation of Malaya (now Malaysia)
- Notable work: Grumpy Old Women (2004–2007); I'm a Celebrity...Get Me Out of Here! (2010)
- Spouse: Geof Powell
- Children: Phoebe Eclair-Powell

Comedy career
- Years active: 1983–present
- Medium: Comedian, author
- Genres: Stand-up, television
- Website: Official site

Jenny Eclair (born Jenny Clare Hargreaves, 1960) is a Malaysian-born English comedian, novelist, and actress, best known for her roles in Grumpy Old Women between 2004 and 2007 and in Loose Women in 2011 and 2012.

== Early life ==
Eclair was born to English parents in Kuala Lumpur, Malaya, where her father, Derek Hargreaves, a major in the British Army, had been posted in 1952. The family lived in Malaysia, Singapore, and Germany before settling in Lancashire. Eclair returned to England when she was two years old, and she started her education at Queen Mary school (now AKS Lytham) in Lytham St Annes.

She is said to have adopted the alternative surname Eclair (later her stage name) in her teens, when she was at a disco in Blackpool and pretended to be French. She studied at the Manchester Polytechnic School of Drama (now Manchester Metropolitan University) and joined a cabaret group variously referred to as Kathy Lacreme and the Rum Babas, or Cathy La Crème and the Rum Babas.

After she moved to London, Eclair's first job was at Camberwell Arts College as a life model, which she did for about two terms. She then saw an advert in The Stage looking for novelty acts and found work doing punk poems. In 1989, when she was named the Time Out Cabaret Award winner, she said it "was nice because it's the first time I've ever won without having to run 100 metres balancing an egg on a spoon". In 1995, Eclair was the first woman to win the Perrier Award at the Edinburgh Fringe Festival for her show Prozac and Tantrums. In a 2024 interview with The Guardian, she said that the prize "didn't make me feel fulfilled" and that she "unravelled" after she had won it.

== Television ==
After an early appearance as a German hotel worker in Auf Wiedersehen, Pet, Eclair starred in the ITV drama The Bill and appeared in the early 1990s Channel 4 comedy series Packet of Three with Frank Skinner, as well as the follow-up series Packing Them In. In 1997, she played Josie in the stage play Steaming by Nell Dunn. In 2001, she published her first novel, Camberwell Beauty.

Eclair provided alternative commentary of the Eurovision Song Contest 2002 for BBC Choice viewers as part of the channel's Liquid Eurovision Party coverage, as a late replacement for broadcaster Christopher Price, who died the month before the contest took place.

=== Grumpy Old Women ===
Eclair helped develop, and appeared on, BBC Two's Grumpy Old Women and its various spin-off shows. In 2006, Eclair starred in the stage show Grumpy Old Women Live! with Dillie Keane and Linda Robson. The show was co-written by Eclair and Judith Holder. The spring saw a sell-out national tour, and June and July a run at the Lyric Theatre in London's West End, and the autumn saw another national tour.

=== Loose Women ===
In 2003, Eclair was a panellist on Loose Women and returned from 2011 to 2012. Her last appearance was on 30 May 2012. She was replaced by actress Shobna Gulati.

=== Empire's Children ===
In 2007, Eclair was featured in episode 5 of the Channel 4 series Empire's Children, a genealogy research programme which followed British public figures as they rediscovered their heritage and its links to British colonialism. Eclair returned to her birthplace of Kuala Lumpur (Malaysia) to explore the historical background of the Malayan Emergency in which her father had fought. During her childhood, Eclair had discovered photographs of beheaded corpses among her father's belongings. She confronted her father who confirmed that they were real and that collecting severed heads was a common practice by the British military in Malaya.

Eclair's reaction to learning of British war crimes during the Malayan Emergency was poorly perceived by some critics as being dismissive of British atrocities during the war. Her behaviour during the episode was later used as a case study by academics researching the Malayan Emergency and British media culture.

=== Drawers Off: The Big Naked Painting Challenge ===
Eclair hosted two seasons of the Channel 4 life drawing competition Drawers Off: The Big Naked Painting Challenge from 2021 to 2022.

=== As a contestant ===
In 2005, Eclair appeared in the reality show Comic Relief Does Fame Academy.

On 18 November 2010, she joined the 2010 series of I'm a Celebrity...Get Me Out of Here!, finishing in third place behind Stacey Solomon and Shaun Ryder.

In August 2012, she appeared in Celebrity MasterChef on BBC One.

She was a contestant in The Great Pottery Throw Down's December 2022 festive celebrity show.

She was a contestant in the fifteenth series of Taskmaster (aired March–June 2023), alongside comedians Frankie Boyle, Mae Martin, Kiell Smith-Bynoe and Ivo Graham.

==== Splash! ====
On 25 January 2014, Eclair took part in the second series of the ITV celebrity diving show Splash!, appearing in the fourth heat.

Stage	Air date	Dive	Judges' scores				Result
Stage	Air date	Dive	Andy Banks	Jo Brand	Leon Taylor	Total	Result
Heat 4	25 January 2014	Forward pike fall (5 metre)	7.0	8.0	6.5	21.5	Eliminated

Scores are out of a possible 30 points in total.

In January 2024, she was a contestant on Richard Osman's House of Games, and again in October 2026 after Michael Sheen replaced Richard Osman as presenter.

=== Guest appearances ===
- Room 101 (26 October 2005) – Guest
- That Sunday Night Show (30 January 2011, 2 October 2011, 19 February 2012) – Panellist
- The Chase: Celebrity Special (5 November 2011) – Contestant
- Saturday Cookbook (7 July 2012) – Guest
- Let's Do Lunch with Gino & Mel (19 July 2012) – Guest
- Pointless Celebrities (12 December 2012) – Contestant
- Tipping Point: Lucky Stars (30 June 2013) – Contestant
- Weekend Kitchen with Waitrose (17 May 2014) – Guest
- Draw It! (19–23 May 2014) – Contestant
- Celebrity Fifteen to One (23 December 2014) – Contestant
- Fifty Shades Uncovered (2015) – Contributor
- QI – Series M, Episode 8 "Merriment" (25 December 2015) – Panellist
- Taskmaster – Series 15 (30 March to 1 June 2023)
- Richard Osman's House of Games – (1 January to 5 January 2024) – Contestant
- Beat the Chasers – (16 February 2024) – Contestant
- House of Games – (26 to 30 October 2026) – Contestant

== Radio ==
Until April 2008, Eclair hosted a weekend talk show on LBC 97.3. Her other radio credits include appearing on BBC Radio 4 in the Just a Minute panel game and afternoon plays, various comedy shows on BBC 7, and regularly covering for Sandi Toksvig on LBC's weekday lunchtime chat show (now defunct).

Between 2014 and 2022, Eclair wrote seven series (36 episodes) of Little Lifetimes, short monologues for female actors, broadcast on BBC Radio 4. As well as Eclair herself, actors including Harriet Walter, Haydn Gwynne, Monica Dolan, Vicki Pepperdine, Imelda Staunton, Anita Dobson, and Ruth Sheen have been the monologist.

Eclair has also hosted her own show on the London radio station LBC Radio and starred in various stage productions.

Eclair sat in for Danny Baker on BBC London 94.9 from Tuesday 30 August until Friday 2 September 2011.

== Other work ==
Eclair fronts the Food Standards Agency's salt reduction campaign "Salt, is your food full of it?".

Eclair appeared at Derby Playhouse in The Killing of Sister George from 13 September 2008 until 18 October 2008.

Eclair hosts a podcast called Older and Wider Podcast, co-hosted with Judith Holder, whom she had previously met and worked with on Grumpy Old Women.

== Books ==
- The Book of Bad Behaviour (non-fiction) Virgin, 1994. ISBN 978-0-86369-856-9
- Camberwell Beauty (novel). Little, Brown, 2000. ISBN 978-0-316-85318-7
- Sit-Down Comedy (contributor to anthology, edited by Malcolm Hardee and John Fleming). Ebury Press/Random House, 2003. ISBN 978-0-09-188924-1
- Having a Lovely Time (novel). Little, Brown, 2005. ISBN 978-0-7515-3605-8
- Life, Death and Vanilla Slices (novel). Sphere, 2012. ISBN 978-1847444936
- Moving (novel). Sphere, 2015. ISBN 9780751550955 (Italian translation: Le stanze dei ricordi, Sperling & Kupfer, 2017. ISBN 978-8820061531)
- Inheritances (novel). Sphere, 2020 ISBN 978-0751567038
- The Writing on the Wall (novel). Hachette Children's Group, 2022. ISBN 978-1510108288

== Personal life ==
Eclair is married to Geof Powell. She previously stated that marriages are "naff". She is the mother of the playwright Phoebe Eclair-Powell, who was born in 1989.

Eclair has discussed having an eating disorder and becoming anorexic while at drama school, saying that she "didn't cook or eat for about 10 years". Her third year of drama school was interrupted when she was sent home and almost hospitalised. She has said that her anorexia is "something I can joke about now, because I'm overweight".
