= I'm a Celebrity...Get Me Out of Here! (British TV series) series 18 =

I'm a Celebrity...Get Me Out of Here!
- Series 18
- Presented by: Declan Donnelly; Holly Willoughby
- No. of days: 22
- No. of castaways: 11
- Winner: Harry Redknapp
- Runner-up: Emily Atack
- Companion show: I'm a Celebrity: Extra Camp
- No. of episodes: 22

Release
- Original network: ITV
- Original release: 18 November – 9 December 2018

Series chronology
- ← Previous; Series 17 Next → Series 19

I'm a Celebrity...Get Me Out of Here! returned for its eighteenth series on 18 November 2018 on ITV, as confirmed by Ant & Dec at the end of the Coming Out show in December 2017.

On 9 August 2018, Anthony McPartlin confirmed that he would not be presenting the then upcoming eighteenth series. On 29 August, it was confirmed that Holly Willoughby would host the eighteenth series with Declan Donnelly whilst McPartlin took a year long break from television. The series opener was watched by just over 14 million people, giving the show its highest rating since the third series in 2004. The show was watched by an average of 12.18 million people a night, making it the most watched season in the show’s history.

The series ended on 9 December 2018 and was won by Harry Redknapp, who was crowned the next 'King of the Jungle', becoming the show's oldest winner and the first male winner since Carl Fogarty in 2014. Emily Atack finished as the runner-up. Redknapp would return to the series eight years later to participate in the second series of I'm a Celebrity... South Africa, alongside other returning campmates to try become the second I'm a Celebrity legend. Redknapp would finish in third place but was the highest placed former winner.

== Celebrities ==
The line-up was confirmed on 12 November 2018.

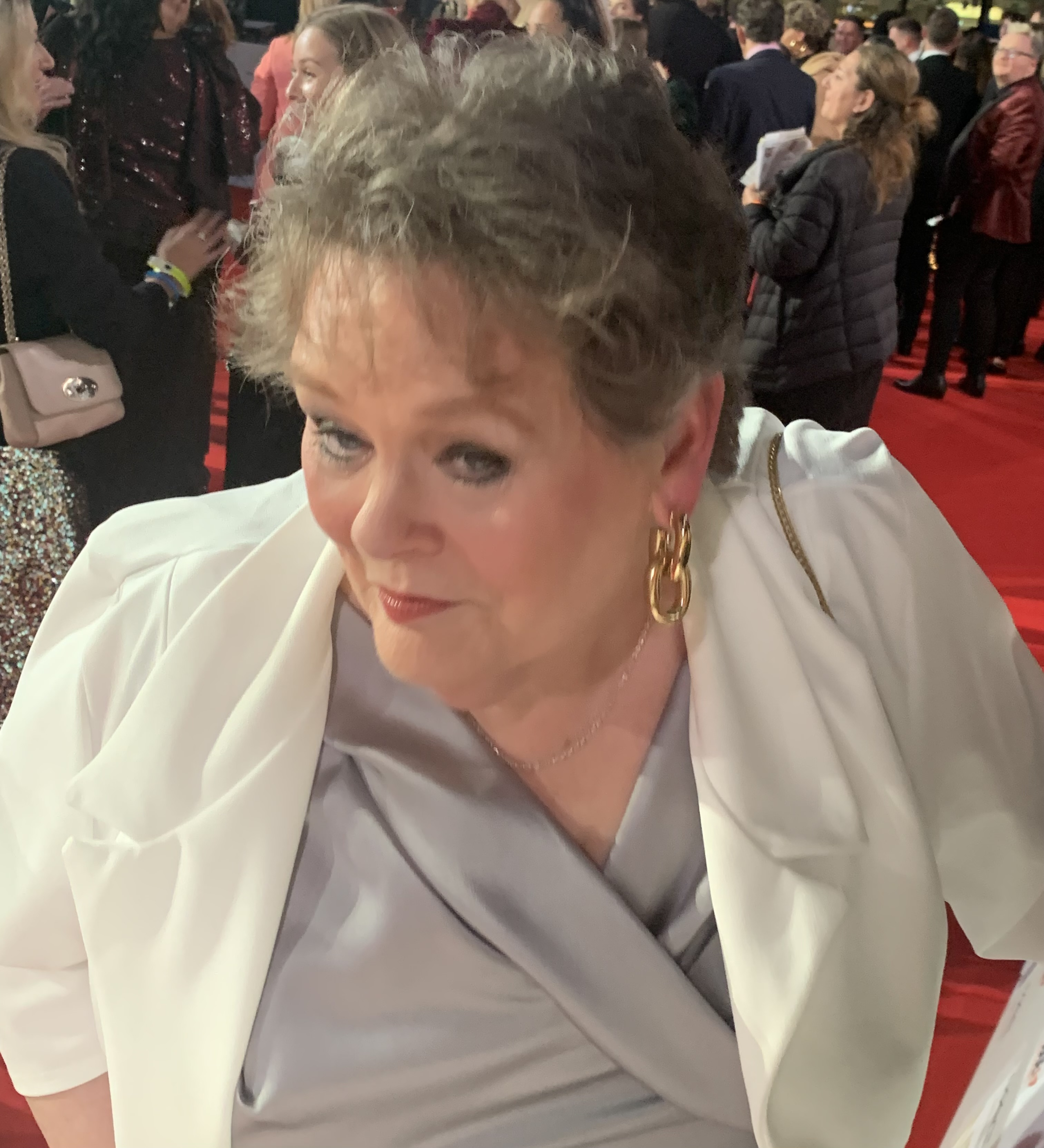
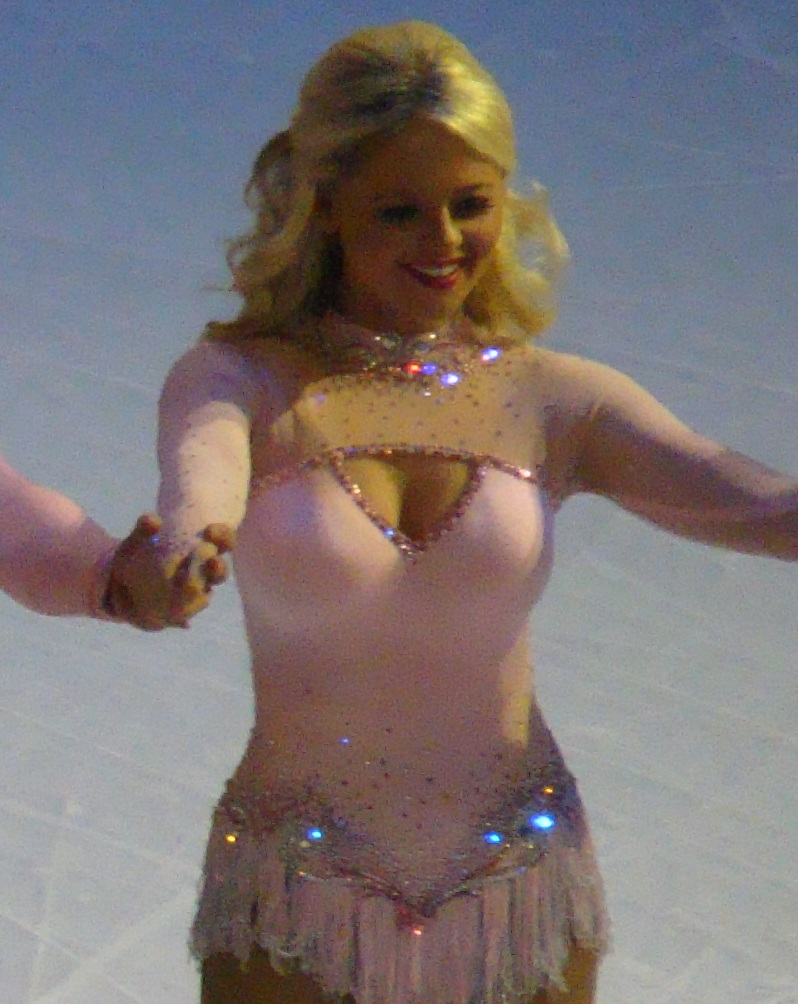
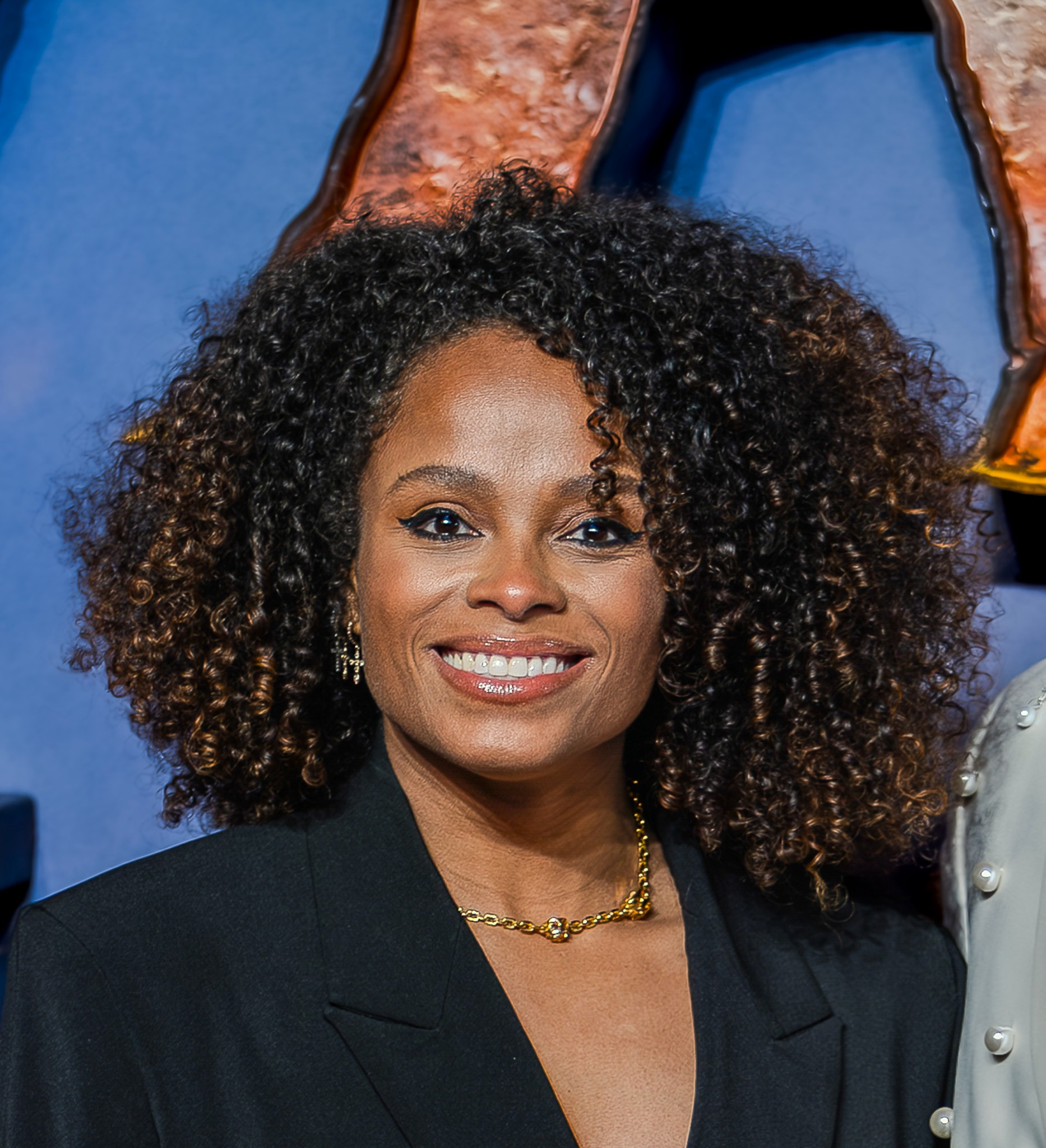
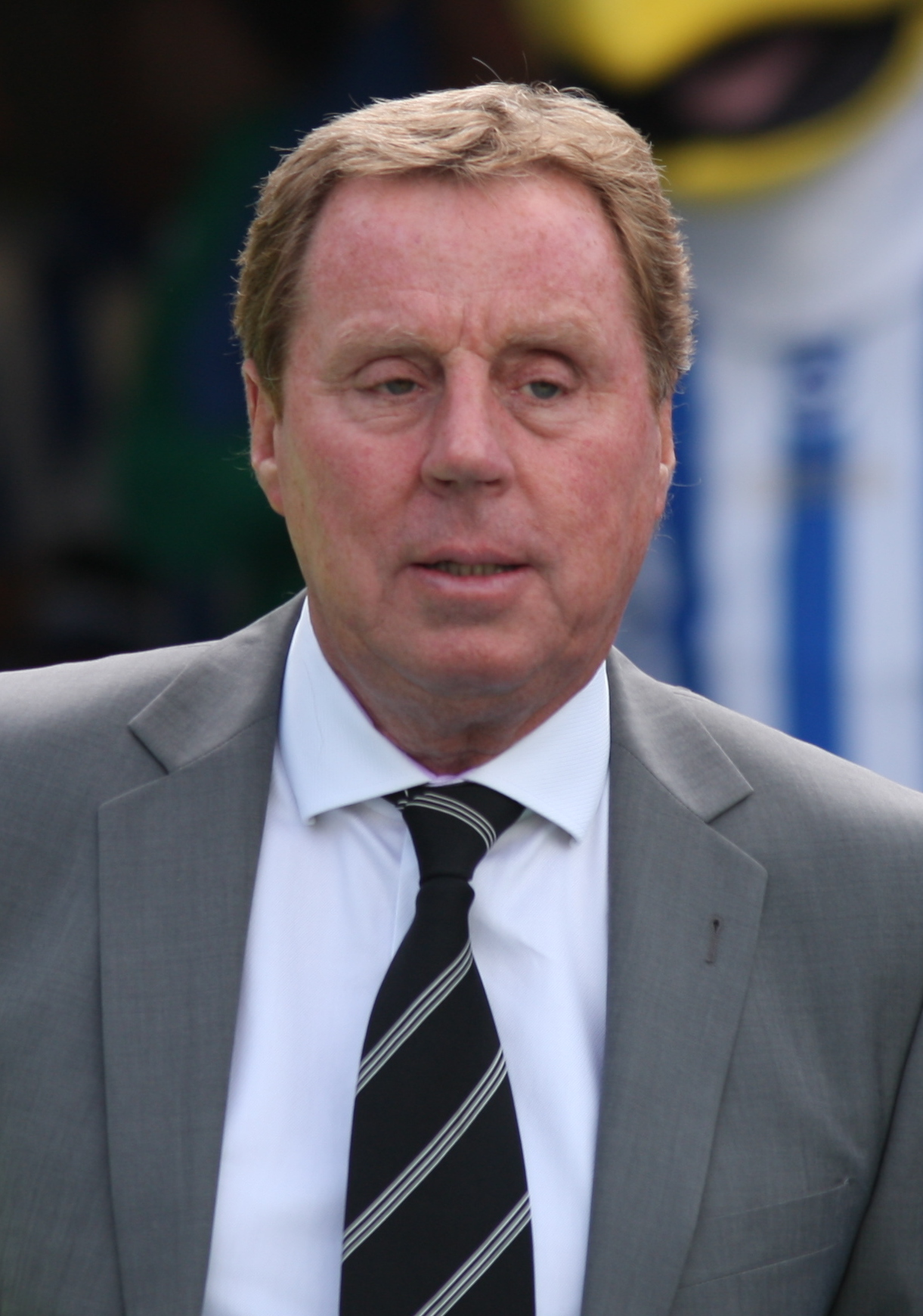
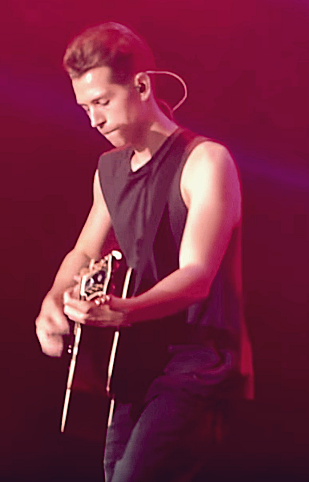
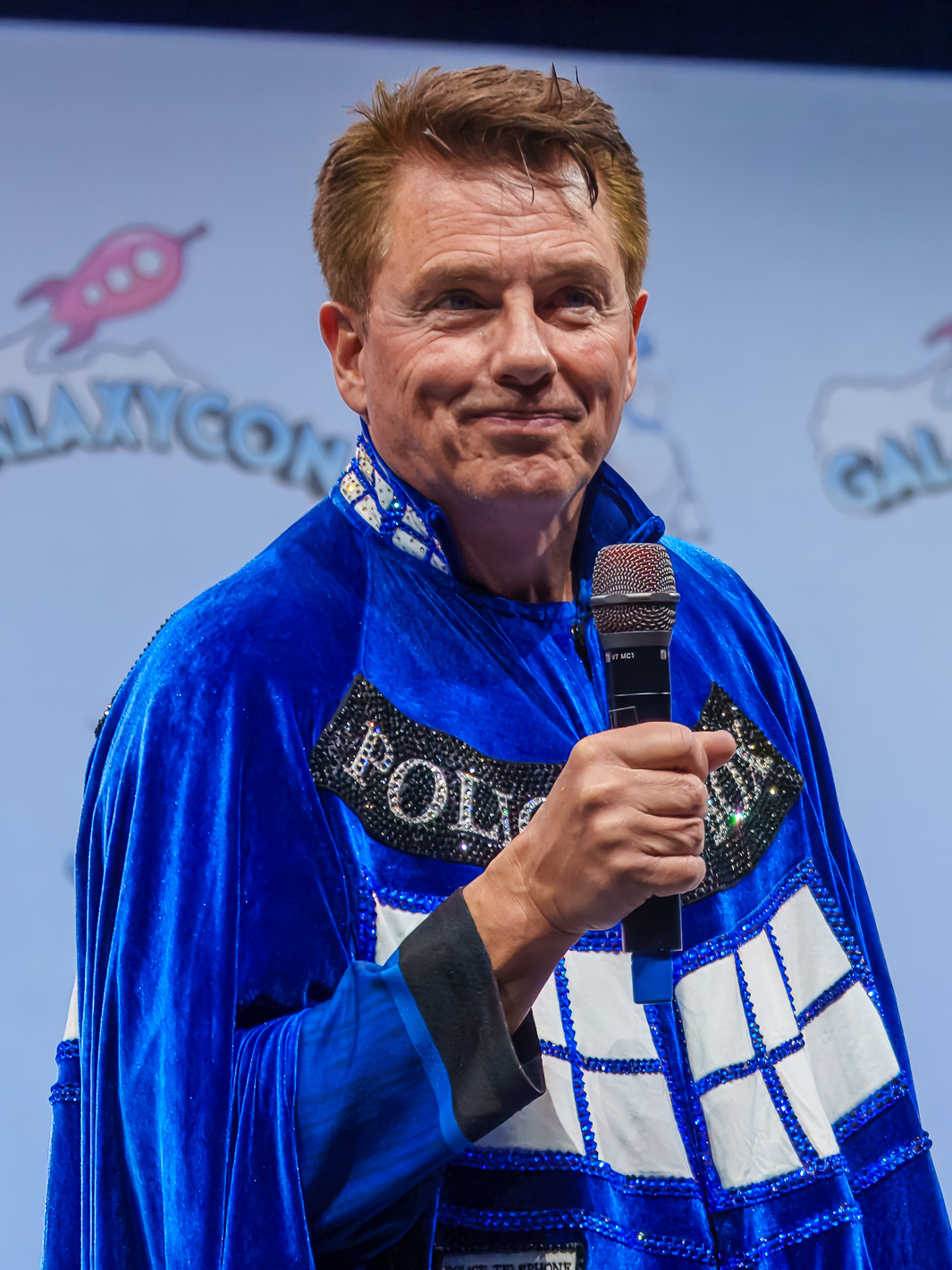
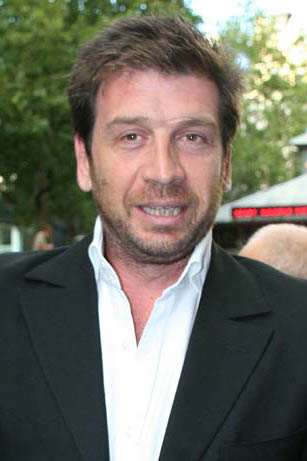
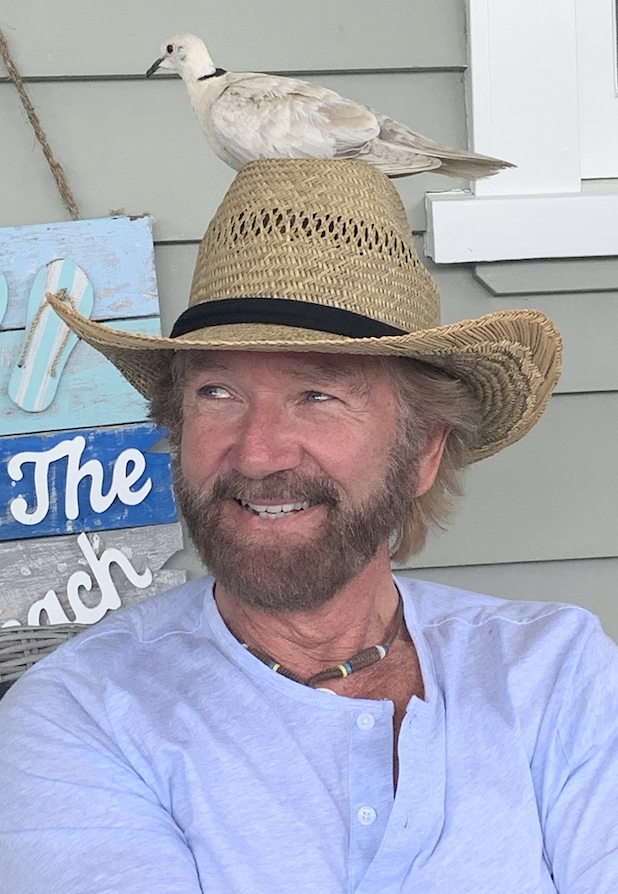
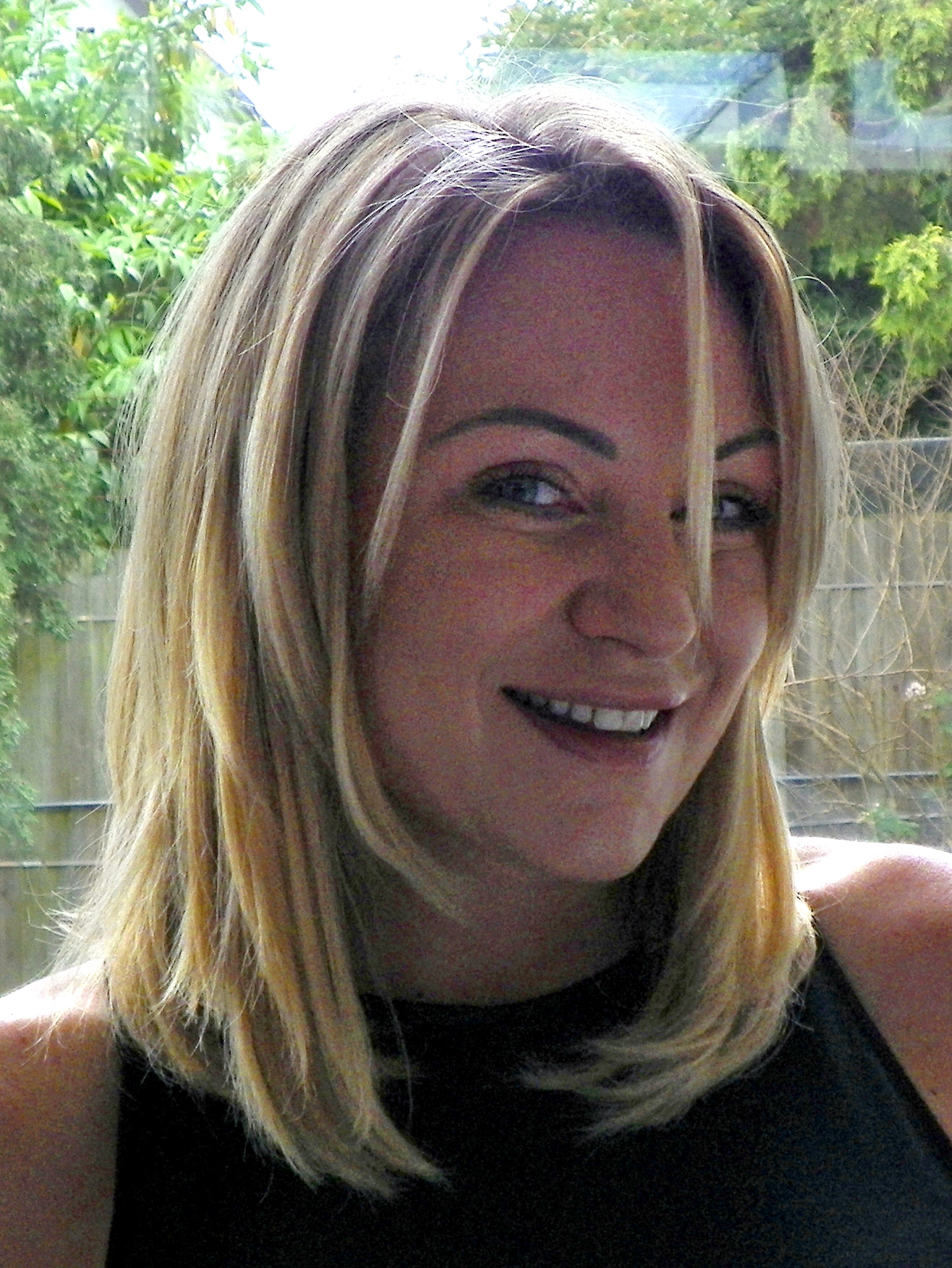
From left to right: Anne Hegerty, Emily Atack, Fleur East, Harry Redknapp, James McVey, John Barrowman, Nick Knowles, Noel Edmonds, and Rita Simons.
Not pictured: Malique Thompson-Dwyer, and Sair Khan.

Celebrity	Known for	Status
Harry Redknapp	Football manager	Winner on 9 December 2018
Emily Atack	Former The Inbetweeners actress	Runner-up on 9 December 2018
John Barrowman	Actor & singer	Third place on 9 December 2018
Fleur East	Singer & The X Factor runner-up	Eliminated 8th on 8 December 2018
James McVey	The Vamps guitarist	Eliminated 7th on 7 December 2018
Nick Knowles	Television presenter	Eliminated 6th on 6 December 2018
Anne Hegerty	The Chase star	Eliminated 5th on 5 December 2018
Rita Simons	Former EastEnders actress	Eliminated 4th on 4 December 2018
Sair Khan	Coronation Street actress	Eliminated 3rd on 3 December 2018
Malique Thompson-Dwyer	Hollyoaks actor	Eliminated 2nd on 2 December 2018
Noel Edmonds	Television & radio presenter	Eliminated 1st on 30 November 2018

== Results and elimination ==
Indicates that the celebrity was immune from the vote
Indicates that the celebrity received the most votes from the public
Indicates that the celebrity received the fewest votes and was eliminated immediately (no bottom two)
Indicates that the celebrity was named as being in the bottom two
Indicates that the celebrity received the second fewest votes and were not named in the bottom two

Daily results per celebrity
Celebrity	Day 13	Day 15	Day 16	Day 17	Day 18	Day 19	Day 20	Day 21	Day 22		Trials	Dingo Dollar challenges
Celebrity	Day 13	Day 15	Day 16	Day 17	Day 18	Day 19	Day 20	Day 21	Round 1	Round 2	Trials	Dingo Dollar challenges
Harry	1st 31.75%	1st 25.70%	1st 24.75%	1st 23.26%	1st 25.44%	1st 28.05%	1st 31.15%	1st 43.22%	1st 57.14%	Winner; 68.95%	6	1
Emily	3rd 16.43%	2nd 11.11%	4th 11.22%	2nd 17.81%	2nd 17.53%	2nd 20.20%	2nd 21.34%	2nd 22.26%	2nd 24.35%	Runner-up; 31.05%	6	3
John	Immune	Immune	3rd 11.84%	4th 11.68%	4th 12.19%	3rd 15.6%	3rd 17.82%	3rd 19.15%	3rd 18.51%	Eliminated (Day 22)	6	1
Fleur	Immune	3rd 11.08%	2nd 12.55%	3rd 12.73%	3rd 15.49%	4th 15.27%	4th 16.75%	4th 15.36%	Eliminated (Day 21)		6	4
James	2nd 16.94%	5th 10.54%	6th 9.98%	6th 9.73%	6th 9.84%	5th 11.39%	5th 12.95%	Eliminated (Day 20)			4	2
Nick	Immune	4th 10.82%	5th 10.03%	5th 10.06%	5th 10.16%	6th 9.49%	Eliminated (Day 19)				4	1
Anne	4th 12.98%	6th 8.72%	7th 7.64%	7th 7.63%	7th 9.35%	Eliminated (Day 18)					3	1
Rita	5th 11.28%	7th 7.63%	8th 7.53%	8th 7.11%	Eliminated (Day 17)						3	2
Sair	Immune	8th 4.89%	9th 4.47%	Eliminated (Day 16)							4	1
Malique	Immune	9th 3.65%	Eliminated (Day 15)								3	1
Noel	6th 10.62%	Eliminated (Day 13)									3	1
Notes	1	2	None						3			
Bottom two (named in)	Noel, Rita	Malique, Sair	Emily, Sair	Fleur, Rita	Anne, John	Fleur, Nick	Harry, James	None				
Eliminated	Noel; 10.62% to save	Malique; 3.65% to save	Sair; 4.47% to save	Rita; 7.11% to save	Anne; 9.35% to save	Nick; 9.49% to save	James; 12.95% to save	Fleur; 15.36% to save	John; 18.51% to win	Emily; 31.05% to win		
Eliminated	Noel; 10.62% to save	Malique; 3.65% to save	Sair; 4.47% to save	Rita; 7.11% to save	Anne; 9.35% to save	Nick; 9.49% to save	James; 12.95% to save	Fleur; 15.36% to save	John; 18.51% to win	Harry; 68.95% to win		

=== Notes ===
- ^Note 1: The celebrities split into four teams for a set of challenges to earn immunity; Galahs (Malique, Nick and Sair), Koalas (Anne, Emily and John), Roos (Fleur, Harry and James) and Underdogs (Noel and Rita). The Galahs won, earning immunity. Fleur and John then won immunity after winning an immunity "playoff" round.
- ^Note 2: John was excluded from the vote on medical grounds.
- ^Note 3: The public voted for who they wanted to win, rather than save.

== Bushtucker trials ==
The contestants take part in daily trials to earn food. These trials aim to test both physical and mental abilities. The winner is usually determined by the number of stars collected during the trial, with each star representing a meal earned by the winning contestant for their camp mates.

The public voted for who they wanted to face the trial
The contestants decided who would face the trial
The trial was compulsory and neither the public nor celebrities decided who took part

Trial number	Air date	Name of trial	Celebrity participation	Public vote	Winner/ Win or Loss/ Number of stars	Notes
1	19 November	The Viper Pit	Emily	37.31%	9/10 stars	1, 2
2	20 November	Monstrous Monoliths	Anne	35.15%	2/10 stars	2
3	21 November	Scary Rose	John	20.47%	10/10 stars	1
4	22 November	Unleash the Beasts	Fleur; James; Nick; Sair	—N/a	4/4 stars	—N/a
5	23 November	Drown and Out	Malique; Rita	29.04% 22.04%	Malique; Rita	1, 3
5	23 November	Drown and Out	Emily; John	—N/a	Malique; Rita	1, 3
6	24 November	Nero to Zero	Harry; Noel	—N/a	11/11 stars	—N/a
7	25 November	Catch a Falling Star	Nick; Noel	12.55% 13.81%	5/11 stars	3
8 (Live)	25 November	The Jungle X Factor	Anne; Emily; Fleur; Harry; Malique; Nick; Noel; Sair	—N/a	Win	4
9	26 November	The Quest	James; John; Rita	—N/a	10/11 stars	—N/a
10	27 November	Hellish Hospital	Anne	19.79%	7/11 stars	—N/a
11	28 November	Dreaded Deliveries	Malique; Sair	15.89% 15.44%	11/11 stars	—N/a
12	1 December	Sickening Sewer	Sair	—N/a	10/10 stars	—N/a
13	2 December	Gore Seasons Pizza	Fleur	39.8%	10/10 stars	1
14	3 December	Stars of the Silver Scream	James; Rita	—N/a	8/9 stars	—N/a
15	4 December	Wicked Warehouse	Emily; Harry; Nick	—N/a	8/8 stars	—N/a
16	5 December	Rotten Retrieval	Fleur; John	—N/a	7/7 stars	—N/a
17	6 December	Ding Dong Merrily Up High	Fleur; James	—N/a	4/6 stars	—N/a
18	7 December	Repvile Centre	Harry	—N/a	5/5 stars	—N/a
19	8 December	Celebrity Cyclone	Emily; Fleur; Harry	—N/a	4/4 stars	5
20	9 December	Fill Your Face	Emily	—N/a	5/5 stars	—N/a
21	9 December	Bushtucker Bonanza	John	—N/a	5/5 stars	—N/a
22	9 December	Danger Downunder	Harry	—N/a	5/5 stars	—N/a

=== Notes ===
- ^Note 1: Anne was excluded from the trial on medical grounds.
- ^Note 2: Only campmates from Snake Rock were eligible for this trial, as a result of losing the entry challenge.
- ^Note 3: As part of the "inner circle", Fleur, Harry and Sair were immune from the trial, as was "Emperor of the Jungle", Noel.
- ^Note 4: This was not a star trial, instead, the celebrities were competing to win time for James, John and Rita, who were competing in a quest to win a feast for the camp.
- ^Note 5: John did not attend the trial, so his star was taken by Fleur.

== Star count ==
Celebrity	Number of stars earned	Percentage
Harry Redknapp	33/33 stars	100%
Emily Atack	26/27 stars	96%
John Barrowman	32/33 stars	97%
Fleur East	29/31 stars	94%
James McVey	26/30 stars	87%
Nick Knowles	17/23 stars	74%
Anne Hegerty	9/21 stars	43%
Rita Simons	18/20 stars	90%
Sair Khan	25/25 stars	100%
Malique Thompson-Dwyer	11/11 stars	100%
Noel Edmonds	16/22 stars	73%

== Dingo Dollar challenges ==
Members from camp will take part in the challenge to win 'Dingo Dollars'. If they win them, they can then take the dollars to the 'Outback Shack', where they can exchange them, for camp luxuries. Kiosk Kev will ask them a question. Two options are given, and the celebrities can choose which they would like to win. However, to win their luxury, a question is asked to the celebrities still in camp via the telephone box. If the question is answered correctly, the celebrities can take the items back to camp. If wrong, they receive nothing and Kiosk Kev will close the shack, and the celebrities will leave empty handed.

The celebrities got the question correct
The celebrities got the question wrong

Episode	Air date	Celebrities	Prizes available	Prize chosen	Notes
2	19 November	Anne; Fleur	Scones with jam & clotted cream Crudités with houmous	Scones with jam & clotted cream	—N/a
4	21 November	Emily; Nick	Sherbet dip Jam roly-poly & custard	Jam roly-poly & custard	—N/a
5	22 November	Malique; Rita	Cheese & grapes Neapolitan gelato	Cheese & grapes	—N/a
10	27 November	Fleur; Noel	Scampi fries Luxury items	Scampi fries	9
14	1 December	Emily; John	Tea; Biscuits	Biscuits	—N/a
15	2 December	Harry; Rita	Crisps; Ice pops	Ice pops	—N/a
16	3 December	Fleur; Sair	Cupcakes; Sausage rolls	Cupcakes	—N/a
17	4 December	Fleur; James	Crumpets; Chocolate chip cookies	Chocolate chip cookies	—N/a
19	6 December	Emily; James	Jelly snakes Millionaire shortbread	Millionaire shortbread	—N/a

- ^Note 9: Luxury items included Emily's hairbrush, Harry's chair, Noel's beard dye and Rita's eye mask.

== Ratings ==
Official ratings are taken from BARB, utilising the four-screen dashboard which includes viewers who watched the programme on laptops, smartphones, and tablets within 7 days of the original broadcast.

Episode	Air date	Official rating (millions incl. HD & +1)	Rank
1	18 November	14.17	1
2	19 November	13.14	1
3	20 November	12.98	4
4	21 November	13.13	2
5	22 November	12.97	3
6	23 November	12.02	7
7	24 November	12.54	6
8	25 November	12.93	5
9	26 November	12.66	1
10	27 November	12.02	4
11	28 November	11.45	7
12	29 November	12.06	3
13	30 November	11.94	5
14	1 December	11.23	8
15	2 December	12.57	2
16	3 December	11.53	2
17	4 December	11.18	5
18	5 December	10.68	7
19	6 December	11.21	4
20	7 December	11.17	6
21	8 December	11.25	3
22	9 December	13.04	1
Series average	2018	12.18	—N/a
Coming Out	12 December	8.71	2
