= Incredible Games =

Television series

- Genre: Children's Game show
- Created by: Stephen Leahy; Andrew O'Connor
- Presented by: David Walliams (1994); Gary Parker (1995)
- Starring: Simon Shelton (1994); Matthew Byam Shaw (1995); Maik Boecker (1995)
- Country of origin: United Kingdom
- Original language: English
- No. of series: 2
- No. of episodes: 24

Production
- Production locations: BBC Elstree Centre (1994); Shepperton Studios (1995)
- Running time: 25 minutes

Original release
- Network: BBC2 (1994); BBC1 (1995)
- Release: 30 January 1994 – 28 March 1995

Incredible Games is a children's game show that originally aired from 30 January to 1 May 1994 on BBC2 and then from 10 January to 28 March 1995 on BBC1. It included a variety of games, performed by contestants between the ages of 10 and 13. The show itself was set in a fictional skyscraper (which was depicted in the titles by a London council tower block, Trellick Tower, in North Kensington) with a talking lift. In the first series, the lift was played by David Walliams, who later starred in Little Britain. In the second series, the lift was given a name, Sam, and was played by Gary Parker.

== Format ==
The aim of the show was to complete each game (set on a "floor" of the skyscraper), gradually rising up the tower. In the first series this climaxed in the alphabet soup game, and in the second series upon reaching the penthouse, where prizes could be won. In series two if a player lost a game, they were sent to the "basement" of the tower (the laundry room), and the other players had to take the lift back down to rescue them. In the first series, the lift doors would open directly into game, whereas in the second series, the lift doors would open to a generic corridor which had a series of doors, with a light above a door in the corridor indicating the relevant room. On occasions during the second series the lift door would open to reveal a darkened corridor with the dark knight walking slowly to the lift, which required the contestants to quickly shut the lift doors.

Two of the more famous games were 'Alphabet Soup' and 'The Dark Knight'. The first game was where giant letters had to be fished out of a swimming pool (ostensibly a soup bowl) to make words on the "fridge". In the second game the contestants had to move from square to square on a chess board (they could only move one space per turn, and every forward movement had to be followed by a sidestep), until they reached the end. The catch was that the "dark knight" was attempting to stop them, though he could only see the player's last move which was lit up.

== Transmissions ==
Series	Start date	End date	Episodes
1	30 January 1994	1 May 1994	14
2	10 January 1995	28 March 1995	10
