= Ted Robbins (football administrator) =

Welsh football administrator

- Born: 1877; Wrexham, Denbighshire, Wales
- Died: 16 January 1946 (aged 68–69); Wrexham, Wales
- Relatives: Ted Robbins (grandson); Kate Robbins (granddaughter); Amy Robbins (granddaughter); Emily Atack (great-granddaughter)

Edward Frederick Robbins (1877 – 16 January 1946) was a Welsh football administrator who was the secretary of the Football Association of Wales from 1909 to his death in 1946. He remains the longest serving secretary in the organisation's history.

Robbins's role included being part of the selection committee for the Wales national football team. In his role, he clashed frequently with the English Football League due to its reluctance to release players for international duty. In 1930, Robbins and the committee were forced to select a team made up largely of amateur and lower division players when the Football League banned the release of Welsh international players. The team dubbed, "Keenor and the 10 unknowns" due to the presence of Fred Keenor, earned a draw with a largely full strength Scotland side.

== Early life ==
Robbins was born in Wrexham, Wales. His father was originally from Bristol but had moved to Wrexham where he managed Wrexham Music Hall. Robbins played amateur football in his youth for local side Wrexham Ivanhoe.

After leaving school, he took up a role at a local newspaper office before working as a clerk in a solicitor's office. He went on to become a prominent solicitor in his hometown.

== Career ==
In 1909, the secretary of the Football Association of Wales (FAW), A.E.V. Berkley left the role over accusations of "negligence and carelessness in regards to his duties". Robbins was appointed in his place on 24 November, receiving an annual salary of £50. He had unsuccessfully applied for the role in 1905. As part of his role, Robbins was part of the selection committee for the Wales national football team. He clashed with the Football League early on during his tenure. Football League clubs were rarely accommodating toward releasing their players for international duty and Robbins complained that English clubs had been "antagonistic" when he had approached them in his first years.

Robbins led a 20-man squad for an FAW XI tour of Canada in 1929 along with FAW vice-president Arthur Thomas and trainer George Latham. Wales played 15 matches against regional teams in little over a month during the tour, winning each one, travelling more than 13,000 miles in the process.

In 1930, the Football League introduced a new rule prohibiting clubs from releasing players for international fixtures that clashed with league games. The move was an attempt to force the governing bodies of the Home Nations to switch to midweek fixtures. Wales' first match under the ruling was the opening game of the 1930–31 British Home Championship against Scotland which was largely unaffected by the ruling as it drew the majority of its players from its own leagues. Robbins was forced to call up a mixture of lower division and amateur players in order to field a side. Nine of Wales' eleven players made their international debut in the game, with only captain Fred Keenor and goalkeeper Len Evans having previous international experience. As a result, the team was dubbed "Keenor and the 10 unknowns". Wales took the lead after six minutes through Tommy Bamford and held on to earn a 1–1 draw against the Scots. After four years, the rule was eventually scrapped, partly due to Robbins's campaigning.

Robbins gained several nicknames during his career, including the "dictator of Welsh football", while the Liverpool Echo described him as possessing "a commanding figure, a smile that won't wear off, a disposition to be envied and a love for the game of football that is good for the game." In his autobiography, England international Cliff Bastin wrote that Robbins "inspired Welsh football. Indeed, I would go farther, and say he was Welsh football." Walley Barnes, a former captain of the Welsh national side echoed Bastin's remarks, describing Robbins as "the greatest man in Welsh football history."

In September 1938, Robbins was hospitalised at the Wrexham and East Denbighshire War Memorial Hospital after contracting a bout of pneumonia. He returned to work but competitive football was postponed following the outbreak of the Second World War. Robbins continued to organise the national side for wartime matches and was described by The Guardian as "carry(ing) on the affairs of football in Wales virtually alone".

Robbins died at his home in Wrexham on 16 January 1946 at the age of 68 after suffering a seizure. At the time of his death, he had served as secretary of the FAW for more than 35 years. He remains the longest serving secretary in the organisation's history. A memorial tablet for Robbins was unveiled at the headquarters of the FAW in Wrexham in August 1952.

== Personal life ==
Robbins had five children. His eldest son John later became his assistant at the FAW. John's brother Mike went on to work as an actor. Several of Robbins's grandchildren also entered showbusiness, including grandson Ted Robbins and granddaughters Amy and Kate Robbins. He is also a great-grandfather of actress Emily Atack.
