= The Caribou Kitchen =

- Also known as: Caribou Kitchen; Claudia's Caribou Kitchen
- Genre: Animation; Children's television series
- Created by: Andrew Brenner
- Developed by: Etta Saunders; Andrew Brenner
- Written by: Andrew Brenner
- Directed by: Guy Maddocks
- Creative director: Peter Maddocks
- Voices of: Kate Robbins
- Narrated by: Kate Robbins
- Theme music composer: Nicholas Paul with lyrics by Andrew Brenner
- Composer: Nicholas Paul
- Country of origin: United Kingdom
- Original language: English
- No. of seasons: 4
- No. of episodes: 52

Production
- Executive producers: Etta Saunders (series 1); Mike Watts (series 2-4)
- Producers: Simon Maddocks (series 1-2); Richard Randolph (series 3-4)
- Camera setup: Filmfex Services
- Running time: 10 minutes per episode (approx.)
- Production companies: Maddocks Cartoon Productions; World Productions; Scottish Television

Original release
- Network: ITV (CITV)
- Release: 5 June 1995 – 3 August 1998

The Caribou Kitchen is a British preschool animated television series, particularly intended for children aged between two and five years old, which aired on the ITV network's CITV block from 5 June 1995 to 3 August 1998, running for 52 episodes over 4 series. The series was created by Andrew Brenner, and was his first television writing role. It mainly aired in a Monday timeslot throughout its run.

It was produced by Maddocks Cartoon Productions and World Productions for Scottish Television. Ealing Animation was credited as a production company in the third and fourth series.

The show's main character is an anthropomorphic caribou called Claudia who runs a restaurant in the fictional town called Barkabout, assisted by her staff, the chef Abe the Anteater, and waiters Lisa the Lemur and Tom the Tortoise. The kitchen serves a number of talking animal guests, including Mrs Panda, Caroline the Cow, Gerald the Giraffe and Taffy the Tiger. Each of the 52 episodes lasts about ten minutes, and intends to teach its pre-school audiences important lessons.

The Caribou Kitchen's narrator is Kate Robbins who also voiced all of the show's characters (both male & female) and sang the show's theme song. The rights to the show are currently owned by DreamWorks Classics and Universal Television, the current successor of Entertainment Rights, who had previously owned the rights.

== Characters ==
- Claudia the Caribou: the title character and owner of The Caribou Kitchen
- Abe the Anteater: the chef or "cook"
- Lisa the Lemur: the waitress
- Tom the Tortoise: the waiter
- Cyril the Squirrel: an assistant staff member
- Caroline the Cow
- Mrs Panda
- Taffy the Tiger
- Kevin the Chameleon: an interior decorator
- Hector the Hippopotamus: who runs the local fruit & vegetable shop
- Godfrey the Goat: a gardener
- Helen the Hamster: the truck driver
- Betty the Beaver: a carpenter
- Flora the Frog
- Sophie the Swallow
- Penelope the Porcupine: runs the Barkabout Corner Shop.
- Gerald the Giraffe
- Susanna the Snake: a doctor

== Episodes ==
=== Season 1 (1995) ===
No. in season	Title	Original release date
1	"Table for Two"	5 June 1995
Hector and Helen pay a visit to Claudia's Caribou Kitchen, and lots of confusion is caused, because whilst Hector is large, because he is a hippopotamus, Helen is small, just because she is a hamster.
2	"Too Many Ant Eaters"	12 June 1995
Claudia goes out shopping to find ingredients for a stew, a salad and a cake. Abe the Anteater, meanwhile, cannot help but eat all the ants in the kitchen, without anybody looking.
3	"First Come, First Served"	19 June 1995
4	"Big is Beautiful"	26 June 1995
Lisa Is tasked with finding a plant pot for one of Abe's plants.
5	"Colour Co-Ordinated"	3 July 1995
Kevin wants to decorate The Caribou Kitchen with yellow paint, but worries that Claudia will not like it.
6	"Not Enough Cooks"	10 July 1995
Claudia is understaffed when Abe is sent home unwell, and Mrs Panda filling in is not helping.
7	"One-Track Tummy"	17 July 1995
Taffy causes trouble in the kitchen by wanting to eat a caribou (Claudia) before ordering a very large meal prepared from a new recipe by Abe.
8	"Rhyme Without Reason"	24 July 1995
9	"A Snack in Time"	31 July 1995
10	"Soap or Soup"	7 August 1995
11	"Share is Fair"	14 August 1995
The Caribou Kitchen holds a birthday party for Sophie the Swallow, but Lisa the Lemur is having trouble trying to share everything out between all the guests.
12	"There's No Need to Shout"	21 August 1995
Betty's two children are being very loud, which Sophie and Flora find very unpleasant.

=== Season 2 (1996) ===
No. in season	Title	Original release date
1	"Old Hat"	15 April 1996
Tom the Tortoise, the only waiter in the Caribou Kitchen, lends Godfrey the Goat his hat when it rains outside in the town, but then, Godfrey eats it when the rain stops.
2	"Copy Cat Squirrel"	22 April 1996
Cyril starts copying everyone In Barkabout while Betty Is making new steps for Abe to reach his ant jar.
3	"Poor Plums"	29 April 1996
4	"The Cherry Tree"	13 May 1996
5	"There's More To Lunch Than Bamboo"	20 May 1996
Mrs. Panda and Caroline the Cow have an argument.
6	"Snake Charmer"	3 June 1996
Susanna the Snake arrives in Barkabout, and she pays a visit to The Caribou Kitchen.
7	"Tigers Keepers"	10 June 1996
Taffy finds a pocket watch, unaware that it actually belongs to Gerald the Giraffe, who is worried about where it has ended up.
8	"Snakes and Ladders"	17 June 1996
Kevin goes to Susanna's new home to decorate it.
9	"Timed Tables"	24 June 1996
Tom is a bit slow to take all orders, while Lisa is a bit hasty to go about.
10	"Lost At Tea"	1 July 1996
Sophie and Flora have a picnic in Barkabout Woods. When Sophie goes to sleep however, Flora wanders off and has tea with Caroline without telling Sophie, causing her to wake up thinking that Flora is lost and getting Claudia to send out a search party.
11	"Untidying Up"	8 July 1996
12	"Pain in the Prickles"	15 July 1996
Cyril gets into an accident with Penelope and hurts his leg, so he goes to see the doctor (Susanna).
13	"Not Enough Pebbles"	22 July 1996
It is Claudia's birthday, and Sophie would like to get her a gift, but she does not have enough pebbles (Barkabout's currency) to do so.

=== Season 3 (1997) ===
No. in season	Title	Original release date
1	"The Bigger the Better"	7 April 1997
Sophie and Flora indulge in the Caribou Kitchen's food, but do not realise is that they have gone over their budget.
2	"Fruit and Nuts"	14 April 1997
Cyril spends a lot of time cracking jokes instead of helping out in the Caribou Kitchen.
3	"Abe's Day Off"	21 April 1997
When Abe sleeps past his alarm clock, and is late for work, Claudia goes to his home, but he lets him have the day off.
4	"Two Friends Are Better Than One"	28 April 1997
Hector and Helen go and see their other Barkabout friends. Hector goes to the Caribou Kitchen with Kevin whilst Helen has tea at Susanna's home.
5	"Proud to Be Prickly"	12 May 1997
Tired with her pointy prickles, Penelope gets some help from Caroline the Cow.
6	"A Very Silly Secret"	19 May 1997
Lisa accidentally breaks a bowl, and must not let Claudia know about it.
7	"The Garden Party"	2 June 1997
A thunderstorm hits Abe's garden. His friends try to help him out.
8	"The Push of the Tiger"	9 June 1997
Taffy gets pushy when things do not go his way.
9	"Moving Slow"	16 June 1997
Tom is late for work again due to his slow pace.
10	"Swing is Here"	23 June 1997
Betty cannot get her new rope swing through the door of the Caribou Kitchen and needs help.
11	"Doctors and Nurses"	30 June 1997
Sophie and Flora fall ill and go to see the doctor, Susanna the Snake.
12	"Bamboo for One"	7 July 1997
Mrs Panda is feeling a bit sad.
13	"Promises, Promises"	14 July 1997
Kevin the Chameleon gets into a bit of a mess when he helps with the decorating.
14	"The Ant Thief"	21 July 1997
Abe hides his jar of ants.

=== Season 4 (1998) ===
No. in season	Title	Original release date
1	"Please Wipe Your Feet"	6 April 1998
The floor of the Caribou Kitchen keeps getting dirty and Claudia cannot work out why.
2	"Help Not Wanted"	20 April 1998
3	"My Way"	27 April 1998
4	"Taffy's Best Friend"	11 May 1998
Taffy notices every animal has a friend except him, And has to find himself a friend to play with.
5	"A Change of Tart"	18 May 1998
6	"Size Isn't Everything"	1 June 1998
Abe is jealous of Godfrey's big tomatoes, so he tries to make them himself to eat, not realising that they do not even taste nice.
7	"You Can Drive My Truck"	8 June 1998
When Helen suddenly sprains a muscle, Hector does her morning delivery while she rests, but he's very nervous to do so.
8	"Two Waiters Are Better Than One"	22 June 1998
When Tom accidentally gets involved in an accident with Mrs Panda because of an argument with Lisa, he is forced to help her move her sofa. Lisa then figures out it can be incredibly hard work to do her jobs and Tom's at the same time.
9	"What's Not Hot Pot?"	6 July 1998
Taffy becomes a chef just like Abe. However It turns out that he does not know how to make bug stew.
10	"A Wash in Time..."	13 July 1998
Lisa tries to do other jobs while waiting for the washing to finish.
11	"Noise Annoys"	20 July 1998
Cyril wants to play music, although it irks Abe.
12	"What the Panda Saw"	27 July 1998
Mrs. Panda's glasses are accidentally broken, so Sophie and Flora help her to find her spare pair.
13	"Cooking for Cooks"	3 August 1998
