= Archibald the Koala =

- Created by: Paul Cox
- Directed by: Claude Allix
- Starring: Richard Griffiths; Adrienne Posta; Dan Russell; Kate Robbins; Bob Saker; Keith Wickham (English version)
- Countries of origin: United Kingdom; France
- No. of episodes: 52

Production
- Executive producers: Kate Fawkes; Peter Orton; Roch Lener; Jonathan Peel; Victor Sleptsov
- Running time: 13 minutes per episode (approx.)
- Production companies: Millimages; Hit Entertainment

Original release
- Network: ITV (CITV) (UK); France 3/Canal J (France)
- Release: 4 September 1998 – 21 July 2000

Archibald the Koala is an animated children's television series produced by French company Millimages in association with HIT Entertainment. The show began in September 1998 on ITV through its children's block CITV in the UK and on Cartoon Network through its international preschool showcase program, Small World in the United States. The show itself is based on the books written by Paul Cox. The show was made in both French and English versions.

== Plot ==
This series is set on a secluded island called "Rastepappe", which is populated by anthropomorphic koalas and badgers. Its city, Koalaville is filled with various strange characters including a nervous mayor, a hopeless inventor, a lazy fisherman, a short-tempered chef and a bossy painter. The stress of the mayor's job causes him to have trouble with migraines, or "meeegranes" as he still pronounces it.

There are always strange things going on in Rastepappe, so Archibald, the trustworthy detective, is put on the job.

== Characters ==
- Archibald the detective — the detective and main character. He is voiced by Richard Griffiths.
- Agatha — a novel writer and Archibald's wife. She is voiced by Kate Robbins.
- Archduke — the mayor of the Koalaville and archduke of Rastepappe. He speaks with an English accent. He has the same voice as Nelson the Elephant from 64 Zoo Lane. He is voiced by Keith Wickham.
- Jozette — Archduke's wife. She speaks with a Victorian accent. She has the same voice as Madam Owl from Pablo the Little Red Fox. She is voiced by Adrienne Posta.
- Giovanni — an opera singer. He speaks with an Italian accent. He is voiced by Dan Russell.
- John Dory — a fisherman and Iris Dory's husband. He speaks with an American accent. He is voiced by Dan Russell.
- Iris Dory — a florist and John Dory's wife. She speaks with an Irish accent. She is voiced by Kate Robbins.
- Edison — an inventor. He speaks with a Royal British accent. He is voiced by Keith Wickham.
- Marie — an architect and painter. She has the same voice as Pablo, Poppy and Pumpkin's Mum from Pablo the Little Red Fox. She is voiced by Adrienne Posta.
- Sullivan — a printer, journalist and Gazette's husband. He speaks with an Australian accent. He has the same voice as Joey's Dad from 64 Zoo Lane. He is voiced by Bob Saker.
- Gazette — Sullivan's wife. She is voiced by Adrienne Posta.
- Soufflé — the island's chef. He speaks with a French accent. He is voiced by Bob Saker.
- Miss Julie — school teacher and astrologer. She speaks with an English accent. She is voiced by Kate Robbins.

There is a population of approximately 500 other civilians on Rastepappe.

== Episodes ==
=== Series 1 (1998) ===
- 1. The Dragon 4 September 1998
- 2. The Meteorite 11 September 1998
- 3. The Rugby-Basket Mystery 18 September 1998
- 4. A Hazardous Fishing Contest 25 September 1998
- 5. The Missing Boat 2 October 1998
- 6. The Heatwave 9 October 1998
- 7. Archduke's Statue 16 October 1998
- 8. The Haunted House 23 October 1998
- 9. A Star is Born 30 October 1998
- 10. The Brass Band 6 November 1998
- 11. Archduke's Amnesia 13 November 1998
- 12. Strange Vibrations 20 November 1998
- 13. The New Restaurant 27 November 1998
- 14. A Hapless Birthday 4 December 1998
- 15. Read about Tomorrow, Today 11 December 1998
- 16. The Flower and the Magician 18 December 1998

=== Series 2 (1999) ===
- 17. What's White And White All Over? 19 August 1999
- 18. The Invasion 26 August 1999
- 19. The Fire Fighters 2 September 1999
- 20. The Floating Island Mystery 9 September 1999
- 21. Great Renovations 16 September 1999
- 22. Archduke's Cockatoo 23 September 1999
- 23. The Lighthouse of Rastepappe 30 September 1999
- 24. The Overworked Printer 21 October 1999
- 25. The Snow Cannon 28 October 1999
- 26. The Flower Thief 4 November 1999
- 27. A Whale Song 11 November 1999
- 28. The Very Greedy Sleepwalker 18 November 1999
- 29. The World of Giants 25 November 1999
- 30. Edison's Clock 2 December 1999
- 31. The Sea Monster 9 December 1999
- 32. The Treasure Hunt 16 December 1999
- 33. An Ultra-Modern Town Hall 16 December 1999
- 34. Stop That Train! 23 December 1999
- 35. A Mysterious Rescuer 30 December 1999

=== Series 3 (2000) ===
- 36. The Messenger 3 April 2000
- 37. The Dynamic Dynamo 10 April 2000
- 38. The Big Show 17 April 2000
- 39. The Lucky Charm 24 April 2000
- 40. The Misunderstanding 1 May 2000
- 41. The Umbrellas of Rastepappe 8 May 2000
- 42. The Big Twister 15 May 2000
- 43. The Machine from the Sky 22 May 2000
- 44. The Fake Necklace 29 May 2000
- 45. Pizza Gazette 2 June 2000
- 46. The Ambulance 9 June 2000
- 47. The Musical Extravaganza 16 June 2000
- 48. A Detective Goes Camping 23 June 2000
- 49. Edison's Trophy 30 June 2000
- 50. The Giant Mole 7 July 2000
- 51. The Waxworks of Rastepappe 14 July 2000
- 52. Archibald's Holiday 21 July 2000

== DVD Releases ==
There is only one volume for every Archibald the Koala season. (1-6)
