= Amy Robbins =

English stage and screen actress

- Born: Amy Louise Robbins; 18 February 1971 (age 55); Higher Bebington, Cheshire, England
- Occupations: Actress; presenter
- Years active: 1986–present
- Spouse: Robert Daws (m. 2003)
- Children: 3
- Relatives: Ted Robbins (grandfather); Paul McCartney (first cousin once removed); Ted Robbins (brother); Kate Robbins (sister); Emily Atack (niece)

Amy Louise Robbins (born 18 February 1971) is an English stage, film and TV actress. She trained at RADA and is best known for her role as Dr. Jill Weatherill in the British television series The Royal. She is currently playing Christina Boyd in Coronation Street. Before this, she played Police Sergeant Rachel James in the BBC One hospital drama Casualty. Robbins has appeared in many TV series including Emmerdale, EastEnders, Hollyoaks, Holby City, World's End, Where the Heart Is, Happiness, My Hero, Heartbeat, Dalziel and Pascoe, The Slammer, Doctors, People Like Us and Noah's Ark.

== Early life ==
Youngest of five children, Robbins was born in Higher Bebington to an acting family. She trained at RADA 1993–1996 having previously received an English and Drama degree from Goldsmiths, University of London 1989–92.

== Career ==
=== Television ===
The 1986 Granada Television sketch show Robbins featured her brother Ted Robbins and sisters Jane, Emma and Kate Robbins.

Before landing the role as Dr Jill Weatherill in The Royal, Robbins played a recurring character, Police Sergeant Rachel James, in the BBC One hospital drama Casualty for one series.

Robbins also appeared in the BAFTA winning TV film My Beautiful Son, playing the part of Maureen opposite Julie Walters.

In 2014, she filmed World's End, a series of 36 15-minute episodes for CBBC.

In March 2017, Robbins joined the cast of Channel 4 soap opera Hollyoaks as Lynette Drinkwell, the mother of Scott Drinkwell.

In 2023, she joined the cast of ITV1 soap opera Coronation Street as Christina Boyd, the mother of established character Daisy Midgeley, played by Charlotte Jordan.

=== Theatre ===
Robbins has appeared in numerous stage productions including A Day in the Death of Joe Egg.

She played Mrs Johnstone in Blood Brothers, from August 2011 to the end of January 2012, at the Phoenix Theatre, London. She also appeared at Chichester Festival Theatre in The Accrington Pals with actress Katherine Kelly.

In 2011, Robbins performed for Queen Elizabeth II at Buckingham Palace in A Celebration of Youth in the Arts with RADA, playing the part of Lady Capulet alongside actors Anne Reid and Bryony Hannah.

In April and May 2013, Robbins played Titania/Hippolyta in A Midsummer Night's Dream at the Royal & Derngate Theatre, Northampton.

In October 2013, she appeared in Sarah Rutherford's Adult Supervision at the Park Theatre.

From January to May 2016, Amy starred alongside her husband Robert Daws in Bill Kenwright's touring production of Rehearsal For Murder.

== Personal life ==
In February 2003, she married her co-star in The Royal Robert Daws, who played Dr Gordon Ormerod, later becoming her screen husband. The couple have three children. She is a first cousin once removed of former Beatle Paul McCartney and the younger sister of Ted Robbins and Kate Robbins, impressionist and actress. Robbins also has two other sisters and is the aunt of actress Emily Atack. Her grandfather Ted served as the secretary of the Football Association of Wales for more than 35 years.

== Filmography ==
Year	Title	Role	Notes
1997	The Second Jungle Book: Mowgli & Baloo	Molly Ward	Supporting role
1997	Up on the Roof	Bryony	Main role
1998	All the Little Animals	Valerie Ann Platt	Supporting role
1998	30 Years to Life	Darla	Television film
1998	Noah's Ark	Emma Pearson	Recurring role (5 episodes)
1999	EastEnders	Jane Carter	Recurring role (4 episodes)
1999	Holby City	Isla	1 episode
2000	Where the Heart is	Shayla Connor	1 episode
2000	Victoria Wood with All the Trimmings	Herself	Christmas TV Special
2001	Happiness	Sophie Clark	1 episode
2001	My Hero	Xil	1 episode
2001	Strange Relations	Maureen	Television film
2001	People Like Us	Erica Fielding	1 episode
2001	Casualty	Sgt. Rachel James	Recurring role (8 episodes)
2002	Killing Me Softly	Sylvie	
2003	Heartbeat	Dr. Jill Weatherill	1 episode
2003–2011	The Royal	Dr. Jill Weatherill	Regular role (87 episodes)
2004	Dalziel and Pascoe	Deborah Mattis	1 episode
2011	The Slammer	Genie	1 episode
2011	Doctors	Susie Dyerson	1 episode
2013	Doctors	Rachel Alton	1 episode
2015	World's End	Stephanie Morelle	Regular role (26 episodes)
2015	Just Life	Karen Weir	Short film
2016	LOAK	Mother	Short film
2017	Hollyoaks	Lynette Drinkwell	Recurring role (4 episodes)
2019	Father Brown	Angelica Evans	1 episode
2019	EastEnders	Caren	Recurring role (4 episodes)
2020	Holby City	Martha Ridgeway	1 episode
2020	Doctors	Katie Banks	1 episode
2022	Emmerdale	Defence Barrister Milligan	Recurring role (6 episodes)
2023–	Coronation Street	Christina Boyd	Series regular

== Theatre credits ==
Year	Title	Role	Notes
1996–1997	Dona Rosita the Spinister	Third Spinster	Almeida Theatre, London
2002	The Accrington Pals	May	Chichester Festival Theatre
2010	A Day in the Death of Joe Egg	Sheila	Nottingham Playhouse
2011	Romeo and Juliet	Lady Capulet	Buckingham Palace
2011–2012	Blood Brothers	Mrs. Johnstone	Phoenix Theatre
2013	A Midsummer Night's Dream	Titania	Royal & Derngate, Northampton
2013	Adult Supervision	Mo	Park Theatre, Finsbury
2016	Rehearsal for Murder	Monica Welles	UK Tour
2016–2017	Blood Brothers	Mrs. Johnstone	UK Tour
2021–2022	Blood Brothers	Mrs. Johnstone	UK Tour
2023–2023	Calendar Girls	Chris Harper	UK Tour
