= Grumpy Old Women Live =

Stage show by Jenny Eclair and Judith Holder

- Original poster, showing the original cast
- Original language: English
- Written by: Judith Holder; Jenny Eclair
- Based on: BBC's Grumpy Old Women
- Subject: Grumpy Old Women
- Genre: Comedy; Drama

Premiere
- Date: 2005
- Place: England
- Official website

Grumpy Old Women Live is a stage show based on the BBC television series Grumpy Old Women.

== History ==
=== Inception ===
In Spring 2005, the idea of a live show of Grumpy Old Women, which had already been successful on the television, came to producer Judith Holder and Grumpy contributor Jenny Eclair, and was co-written by the two. They cast the show, and rehearsals began for a mini-tour in the Autumn of 2005. The original production was directed by Chris George, and mini-tour of seven dates set off in November 2005 and was a success.

=== National and international tours ===
In the Spring of 2006, the original cast, Jenny Eclair, Dillie Keane and Linda Robson set off on a 40-date sell-out national tour. Following this, they went straight into a four-week West End run at the Lyric Theatre, Shaftesbury Avenue.

For the Autumn tour, two brand-new members were recruited: Rhona Cameron and Annette Badland. Together with Jenny Éclair, they ventured off on another sold-out national tour.

In Spring 2007, Éclair went with Linda Robson and Dillie Keane to Australia on the first international tour of Grumpy Old Women.

A success in Sydney, Brisbane, Melbourne and Perth proved beyond any doubt that the "Grumpy Old Woman" is a global phenomenon. As stated in the official website, "from Cardiff to Canberra, women of a certain age could finally unite behind a common fear of graying hairs and sagging rears. Around the world it was suddenly ok to celebrate the cellulite. This again made the Grumpies very happy. We came, we grumbled, we conquered."

Two years after the first mini-tour, two new members were recruited, Denise Black and Britt Ekland. Along with Dillie, the three went on nationwide complain-a-thon.

The show toured regional New Zealand in March 2010, directed by David McPhail, starring Geraldine Brophy, Pinky Agnew, and Lyndee-Jane Rutherford.

On 23 June 2008, the original cast (Jenny Eclair, Dillie Keane and Linda Robson) reunited for one night only at the Richmond Theatre; the performances (a matinee and an evening) were filmed for DVD.

=== Subsequent shows ===
It was announced in March 2009 that brand new show Grumpy Old Women Live 2: Chin Up Britain would see Susie Blake (Coronation Street, The Victoria Wood Show) and Wendi Peters (Coronation Street, Bad Girls) star alongside original Grump Jenny Eclair, who is also co-writing with Judith Holder. The show transferred to the Novello Theatre, London, for an eight-week run from 14 April to 5 June 2010.

The 2014/2015 show was Fifty Shades of Beige.

The 2018 tour is Grumpy Old Women to the rescue and stars the original Jenny Eclair and Dillie Keane with newcomer comedian Lizzie Roper.

== Previous and current members ==
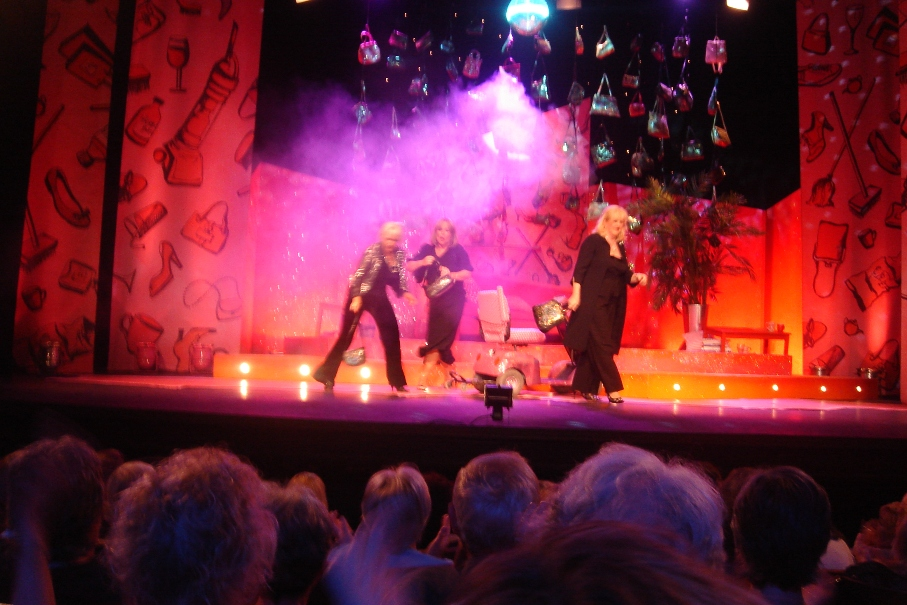
Eclair, Keane and Robson in their final performance of Grumpy Old Women Live.

- Current (2018 Tour)
  - Jenny Eclair
  - Dillie Keane
  - Lizzie Roper
- Previous
  - Annette Badland
  - Denise Black
  - Britt Ekland
  - Rhona Cameron
  - Linda Robson
  - Wendi Peters
  - Susie Blake
  - Kate Robbins

== Reception ==
Grumpy Old Women was a commercial and critical hit.

== See also ==
- Grumpy Old Women
