= 30 Years to Life (1998 film) =

American TV movie

- Also known as: Nightworld: 30 Years to Life
- Written by: Shawn Thompson
- Directed by: Michael Tuchner
- Starring: Robert Hays; Hugh O'Conor; Amy Robbins; Christien Anholt; Gabrielle Lazure; Vernon Dobtcheff; Michael Byrne
- Music by: Jim McGrath
- Country of origin: United States
- Original language: English

Production
- Executive producers: Lewis B. Chesler; David Perlmutter; Stephen Ujlaki
- Producer: Ken Gord
- Cinematography: Jon Joffin
- Editor: Dean Bolser
- Running time: 90 minutes
- Production companies: Alliance Communications; CLT-UFA; Delux Productions; Chesler/Perlmutter Productions

Original release
- Network: UPN
- Release: October 15, 1998

30 Years to Life (also known as Nightworld: 30 Years to Life) is a 1998 American made-for-television science fiction film directed by Michael Tuchner and starring Robert Hays, Hugh O'Conor and Amy Robbins. It was created for UPN in 1998 for the Thursday Night at the Movies block, as part of the six film Nightworld anthology. It was the first film in the anthology to air on the block. Filming took place in the summer of 1998 in the Grand Duchy of Luxembourg, primarily Luxembourg City.

== Plot summary ==
In a futuristic society where prison has been abolished, a 15-year-old is punished for a murder he didn't commit by being subjected to a process that ages him thirty years. As an older man he sets out to find the real killer.

== Cast ==
- Robert Hays....Vincent Dawson
- Hugh O'Conor....Young Vincent 'Vinnie' Dawson
- Amy Robbins....Darla
- Mirabelle Kirkland....Gweneth
- Christien Anholt....Derek
- Gabrielle Lazure....Kate
- Jana Sheldon....Noreen
- Zoot Lynam....Kyle
- Doug Haley....Ben
- Geoffrey Bateman....Detective Sidney
- Michael J. Shannon....Graham
- Kenny Seymour....Manager
- Larue Hall....Judge Slark
- Liza Sadovy....Doctor
- Jules Werner....Clerk
- Robert L. Hall....Prosecutor
- Radica Jovicic....Defense Attorney

Special Appearances by:

- Vernon Dobtcheff....Sandor
- Michael Byrne....Oliver Mather
- Josie d'Arby....Lucy
- Bill Dunn....School Teacher

== Home media ==
- United States:

The film was released on DVD in several combo packs from Echo Bridge Home Entertainment in 2010.
It is available to watch On Demand through Amazon Prime Video from FilmRise.

- Germany:

It was released on DVD as a single release and a combo pack in 2004.

- Japan:

It was released on VHS in 2000.

== See also ==
- List of television films produced for UPN
- List of science fiction films of the 1990s
- List of drama films of the 1990s
- List of Canadian films of 1998
