= The Emily Atack Show =

- Genre: Impressions; Sketch show; Stand-up comedy
- Country of origin: United Kingdom
- Original language: English
- No. of series: 3
- No. of episodes: 18

Production
- Running time: 45 minutes
- Production company: Monkey Kingdom

Original release
- Network: ITV2
- Release: 4 November 2020 – 1 November 2022

The Emily Atack Show is a British comedy television series, hosted by Emily Atack and shown on ITV2. Each episode combines her stand-up shows at London's Clapham Grand with sketches and impressions, while focusing on a particular topic relevant to young women.

In 2020, ITV revealed the first series of the show achieved the biggest audience for a female-led stand up show that year. In 2021, it was nominated for ‘Best Comedy’ at the TV Choice Awards; series 2 was broadcast the same year. In 2022, it was announced that the show would be renewed for a third series; it began broadcasting on 27 September that year.

== Broadcast ==
The first season ran for six episodes during late 2020. Following its debut series, the show was renewed for a second series in March 2021. A third season was announced in February 2022 and began broadcasting seven months later.

== Episodes ==
Series	Episodes	Originally released	
Series	Episodes	First released	Last released
1	6	4 November 2020	9 December 2020
2	6	7 October 2021	11 November 2021
3	6	27 September 2022	1 November 2022
