= Hank Osasuna =

English actor (born 1972)

- Born: 1972; London, United Kingdom
- Other names: Spinmaster Plantpot
- Occupation: Actor
- Known for: Acting in Keith Lemon: The Film

Hank Osasuna (born 1972) is an English actor and performance artist. His performance persona is Spinmaster Plantpot.

== Biography ==
Osasuna grew up in Chadwell Heath in London. After working in the House of Lords for 14 years, Osasuna took up acting full-time and has appeared in many prime-time advertisements for brands, including Cadbury, Heineken, and 118.

He is the pioneer of punk-rock poetry, a mix of a cappella singing, poetry and comedy.

Osasuna has been heavily involved in promoting and performing on both the American and British antifolk circuits.

When performing a set in 2008, he was discovered by Leigh Francis; Francis offered a part in Keith Lemon's Brilliant World Tour as Mad Paul. After this, Osasuna subsequently appeared as Mad Paul in the 2012 comedy film Keith Lemon: The Film and the ITV2 2012–2013 mock-reality television series Lemon La Vida Loca. In October 2015, he appeared in Keith Lemon's Back T'Future Tribute on ITV2.

He appeared as various characters in Keith Lemon's ITV2 television series The Keith Lemon Sketch Show from 2015 until 2016. He also appeared in The Keith and Paddy Picture Show, series 1 and 2, as well as Keith Lemon; Coming in America.

=== Personal life ===
Osasuna is known for his height – four feet, eleven inches.
