= Simon Shelton =

British actor (1966–2018)

- Born: Simon Barnes Shelton; 13 January 1966; Bethnal Green, London, England
- Died: 17 January 2018 (aged 52); Liverpool, England
- Occupation: Actor
- Years active: 1988–2018
- Notable work: Playing Tinky Winky in Teletubbies (1997–2001)
- Spouse: Emma Robbins
- Children: 3
- Relatives: Emily Atack (niece)

Simon Barnes Shelton (13 January 1966 – 17 January 2018) was an English actor.

== Biography ==
Shelton was born in the Bethnal Green area of London on 13 January 1966.

Shelton was best known for his children's television work. He portrayed Tinky Winky on Teletubbies from 1997 to 2001, replacing the original actor Dave Thompson. He also played Dark Knight on the first series of Incredible Games in 1994.

Shelton was married to Emma Robbins. They had three children and lived in Ampthill, Bedfordshire. Shelton's niece is actress Emily Atack.

Shelton had a history of alcoholism. On 17 January 2018, he was found dead in a car park stairwell near the Port of Liverpool Building in Liverpool at the age of 52. His cause of death was hypothermia and he had a high concentration of alcohol in his system.
