= The Keith Lemon Sketch Show =

Television series

- The title card for series 2
- Genre: Sketch show
- Written by: Leigh Francis; Jamie Deeks; Dan Johnston
- Directed by: Jamie Deeks; Dan Johnston; Paul Taylor
- Starring: Leigh Francis; Paddy McGuinness; John Thomson; Tom Davis; Fearne Cotton; Phillip Schofield; Emily Atack; Ruth Langsford; Eamonn Holmes; Vernon Kay; Jessica Hynes; Ashley Roberts; Kate Thornton; Bill Oddie
- Country of origin: United Kingdom
- Original language: English
- No. of series: 2
- No. of episodes: 12

Production
- Executive producer: Leon Wilson
- Producers: Jamie Deeks; Dan Johnston
- Running time: 30 minutes (inc. adverts)
- Production company: Talkback in association with Bang Tidy Productions

Original release
- Network: ITV2
- Release: 5 February 2015 – 10 March 2016

Related
- Bo' Selecta!

The Keith Lemon Sketch Show is a British television impressions/character sketch show that aired on ITV2 from 5 February 2015 until 10 March 2016. It stars Leigh Francis' character Keith Lemon portraying several celebrities.

== Episodes ==
=== Series 1 ===
The first series aired from 5 February until 12 March 2015 on ITV2. Paddy McGuinness, Bill Oddie and Fearne Cotton appeared in all episodes in this series.

Official Viewing Figures are from BARB.

Episode	Original air date	Guests	Viewers (millions)
1	5 February 2015	Eamonn Holmes, Carrie Fisher and Phillip Schofield	1.47
2	12 February 2015	Fearne Cotton, John Thomson, Paddy McGuinness and Emily Atack.	1.10
3	19 February 2015	Christine Bleakley, Ashley Roberts, Antony Costa, Carrie Fisher, Kate Thornton, Verne Troyer and Jonathan Ross	0.84
4	26 February 2015	Sarah Harding, Peter Andre and Martine McCutcheon	0.77
5	5 March 2015	Dermot O'Leary, Dave Myers, Si King, Louis Walsh, Shane Filan, Joe Swash, Cleo Rocos and Emma Bunton	0.98
6	12 March 2015	Ruth Langsford, Rylan Clark and Sarah Harding	0.82

=== Series 2 ===
The second and final series of The Keith Lemon Sketch Show aired from 4 February until 10 March 2016 on ITV2. Paddy McGuinness, Jessica Hynes, Vernon Kay, Ruth Langsford and Eamonn Holmes made regular appearances in this series.

Official Viewing Figures are from BARB.

Episode	Original air date	Guests	Viewers (millions)
1	4 February 2016	Simon Callow, Will Mellor and Ella Eyre	0.97
2	11 February 2016	Kate Garraway, Simon Callow, Jimmy Carr and Jenny Powell	0.75
3	18 February 2016	Phillip Schofield, Paul Daniels, Will Mellor and Andi Peters	0.72
4	25 February 2016	Mark Arnold, Fearne Cotton, Marvin Humes, Chris Kamara and Andi Peters	Under 0.74
5	3 March 2016	Kate Garraway, Phillip Schofield, Joe Swash, Simon Callow and Fearne Cotton	Under 0.8
6	10 March 2016	Gino D'Acampo, Will Mellor, Fearne Cotton, Jamie Laing, Professor Green, Kelly Brook and Yvette Fielding	Under 0.78

== Sketches ==
Sketch	Series 1	Series 2
The Big Fat Gypsy Kardashians		
The Hairy Lairy Bikers		
Dickinson's Any Old Shit		
The Exciting Life of Mark Wright & Michelle Keegan		
Keith & Paddy's Film Bit		
This Morning		
Doodles!		
Backstage with Cheryl & Kimberley		
The Urban Fox		
The Great British Piss Up		
OptimalFacialSolutions.com		
Oh no! There's something wrong with my body I must go on television and talk about it		
Ant & Dec Undercover		
Jedward 2050		
Billy & Miley's European Vacation		
Downtoon		
Come Dine with Me		
Ed Sheeran Watch		
Cooking with Sloth		
Fearne Cotton Meets One Direction		
Kate Garraway in the Morning		
Keith's Doing it for Charity		
Cowboy Builders		
Family Fortunes		
The Cartoon Job Centre		
Martin Clunes Really Loves Animals		
The Trip		
If Miss Marple was Much More Real		
The X Factor: Behind the Scenes		
George Lucas Says the Funniest Things		
This Week's Spotted		
Denzil Rowe: Waxwork Sculptor		
The Keith Lemon Sketch Show: The Gossip		
Taylor Swift Making Friends		
Mick Hucknall: Nightmare Neighbour		
The Adventures of Minty Cat and Diablo		
Ant & Dec's Jungle Trials		

== Series 1 (2015) ==
=== The Big Fat Gypsy Kardashians ===
This is an amalgamation of Big Fat Gypsy Weddings and Keeping Up with the Kardashians. During the series, we follow Kim's marriage to Kanye. The whole sketch shows how trivial both programmes are. They later reappear in Keith Lemon - Coming In America.

Characters

- Kim Kardashian
- Kourtney Kardashian
- Khloe Kardashian
- Bruce Jenner
- Kris Jenner
- Kanye West
- Jay-Z
- Lionel Richie
- Paris Hilton

=== The Hairy Lairy Bikers ===
This is a cruder take on the Hairy Bikers. In series 2, Dave and Si are on a world trip with more crude stuff.

=== Come Dine with Me ===
He-Man and Skeletor star in this episode of Come Dine with Me.

=== The Exciting Life of Mark Wright & Michelle Keegan ===
Mark Wright and Michelle Keegan are seen doing boring, uninteresting, everyday things.

=== This Morning ===
Lemon plays the part of Holly Willoughby and Hank Osasuna plays the part of Phillip Schofield and Eamonn Holmes. Some scenes focus around phone-ins, fashion advice and medical help. Many jokes are made about Holly's breasts. Other minor characters include Denise Robertson, Jeff Brazier, The Speakmans, Dr Chris Steele and Gino D'Acampo.

=== Backstage with Cheryl & Kimberley ===
Cheryl tells Kimberley about what has happened to her recently. Both stories are later cleared up by Kimberley to actually be various well-known film plots. After realising that Kimberley is right, Cheryl shrugs this off as having "been under a lot of pressure recently".

=== OptimalFacialSolutions.com ===
An overenthusiastic, stereotypical American plastic surgeon whose approach is rather lazy.

=== Doodles! ===
A typical 90s kids' art programme but with a presenter resembles Pat Sharp or Neil Buchanan who continually makes sexual references. In series two, the format is changed slightly, whereby presenter Dicky Doodles is seen "out and about".

=== The Great British Piss Up ===
With a similar format to The Great British Bake Off, this sees six people trying to get as drunk as possible in the space of an hour.

=== The Urban Fox ===
This sees a well-meaning fox (Lemon) terrorising his neighbourhood and in most episodes, clashes with a local dog (Davis). In one episode, it is revealed that The Urban Fox's real name is Russell and that he lives with his mother.

He reappeared in the 2018 series Keith Lemon - Coming In America, where he has shown to have migrated to America.

=== Oh no! There's something wrong with my body I must go on television and talk about it ===
A bizarre take on Embarrassing Bodies. The host of the show is Dr Chrispian, a strange version of real-life host and doctor, Dr Christian Jessen. Dr Chrispian is a somewhat egotistical centaur with an "incredible physique".

=== Ant & Dec Undercover ===
Ant & Dec go undercover for Saturday Night Takeaway but it sees their costumes as unrealistic and not very convincing. A new sketch was introduced in series 2 featuring Ant and Dec which was based on I'm a Celebrity... Get Me Out of Here!, entitled "Jungle Trials".

=== Jedward 2050 ===
This sees Jedward as old men and generally ends with them going to the bookies.

=== Billy & Miley's European Vacation ===
Miley Cyrus and her father Billy Ray are touring Britain. Billy Ray is hoping some of the British politeness will turn Miley into a lady, however she normally ends up getting her breasts out and doing something inappropriate.

=== Downtoon ===
A tongue-in-cheek look at how Downton Abbey would look if written by the writers of Geordie Shore in order to appeal to a younger audience.

=== Dickinson's Any Old Shit ===
This is a typical auction programme a parody of Dickinson's Real Deal, hosted by David Dickinson portrayed by Lemon. This version sees viewers bring in everyday rubbish in order to make a few pence. Such items include half a bottle of bleach spray, adult magazines and a jacket potato with coleslaw and cheese. For some reason, this David Dickinson blows raspberries and makes bizarre noises after every other sentences.

Lemon's version of Dickinson later appears in Keith Lemon - Coming In America.

=== Ed Sheeran Watch ===
A Springwatch-style programme following Ed Sheeran, who is living in a forest. The voiceover is provided by Bill Oddie, former presenter of BBC Two's Springwatch programme.

=== Keith & Paddy's Film Bit ===
Keith Lemon and Paddy McGuinness reenact famous movie scenes but the scenes are normally ruined by Keith who tends to go too far. Movies Viewed

- Toy Story
- Rocky
- Batman

=== Cooking with Sloth ===
A cooking show hosted by Sloth from The Goonies.

=== Fearne Cotton meets One Direction ===
Fearne Cotton talks with One Direction who tells her silly bits of work on their music videos (e.g. pretending to play instruments). Lemon plays Harry Styles - who has a thing for elderly women quoting "I love sweet wrinkly vag me" and Hank Osasuna plays Zayn Malik.

- Harry Styles
- Niall Horan
- Zayn Malik
- Liam Payne
- Louis Tomlinson

== Series 2 (2016) ==
=== Mick Hucknall: Nightmare Neighbour ===
In a parody of similar prime time series, Mick Hucknall (Lemon) is accused of being a "nightmare neighbour", but goes out of his way to protest his innocence. Other "nightmare neighbours" include Paul Weller.

=== Taylor Swift: Making Friends ===
Taylor Swift (Lemon) tries to make friends with complete strangers while on vacation in the United Kingdom, but ends up alienating more people than she befriends with her impatience and rudeness.

=== Kate Garraway in the Morning ===
Lemon plays a fictitious Hollywood reporter known as "George Clooney's Pig" in a spoof of the breakfast show Lorraine, which in turn is instead presented by Kate Garraway. Characters

- Kate Garraway

=== Keith's Doing it for Charity ===
Lemon fronts a fictitious charity campaign in which he is trained by Eamonn Holmes and Ruth Langsford to have sex non-stop for ten days whilst travelling the length and breath of Britain, raising money for charity.

=== Cowboy Builders ===
Dominic Littlewood (Lemon) presents a spoof version of Cowboy Builders in which dodgy builders actually turn out to be real cowboys, and end up in a gunfight, which in turn destroys the persons' home even more.

=== Family Fortunes ===
Vernon Kay presents a spoof version of All Star Family Fortunes in which Little Mix and One Direction go head to head. However, many of the top answers relate to some form of innuendo. Characters

- Vernon Kay
- Jade Thirlwall
- Leigh-Anne Pinnock
- Jesy Nelson
- Perrie Edwards
- Harry Styles
- Niall Horan
- Liam Payne
- Guest-Eileen

=== Ant & Dec's Jungle Trials ===
Ant & Dec (Lemon) host a spoof version of I'm a Celebrity... Get Me Out of Here! in which Will has to perform sexual acts on Ant in order to win meals for the camp.

=== George Lucas Says the Funniest Things ===
Presented by Phillip Schofield, this segment parodies the typical daytime gameshow format. George Lucas (Lemon) has to describe an everyday object or item and two contestants, Jennifer and Ian (also portrayed by Lemon), have to guess what the item is. Typically, Ian keeps making references to Star Wars, leading an irate Schofield to constantly remind him the show has no links to Star Wars whatsoever. The first sketch attracted much press attention after Schofield is seen to tell contestant Ian to "f**k off" after he becomes increasingly annoying.

=== The Cartoon Job Centre ===
Jessica Hynes plays the owner/manager of a job centre which specializes in finding work for jobless cartoon characters. Lemon plays a variety of cartoon characters, including the Care Bears.

=== Martin Clunes Really Loves Animals ===
Martin Clunes (Lemon) presents a spoof animal documentary series in which he proceeds to wish to 'bum' every animal that he comes into contact with.

=== This Week's Spotted ===
Lemon plays a variety of celebrities who engage in weird or unexpected activities, such as Prince going to a car boot sale and Russell Brand learning to ride a skateboard.

=== The Adventures of Minty Cat and Diablo ===
Lemon stars as Minty Cat, one half of a crime fighting duo similar to Batman and Robin, who try to foil plots against them by known supervillains and crazed enemies.

=== The Keith Lemon Show: the Gossip ===
Fearne Cotton presents a spoof spin-off from show entitled The Gossip (which in itself is a parody of Take Me Out: The Gossip) in which Lemon and a number of guests sit in a posh bar and talk about the show.

=== The Trip ===
Lemon and Joe Swash parody the BBC Two series The Trip, starring Steve Coogan and Rob Brydon, whereby they visit a series of run-down restaurants and talk about their languishing careers.

=== If Miss Marple Was Much More Real ===
Lemon portrays a contemporary version of Miss Marple, who turns up at crime scenes, only to be told to "f**k off" by the local police who claim that the general public have no right to investigate murders.

=== The X Factor: Behind the Scenes ===
Olly Murs (Lemon) and Caroline Flack present a behind-the-scenes look at The X Factor, alongside judges Nick Grimshaw (Lemon), Rita Ora (Davis) and Simon Cowell (also portrayed by Lemon).

- Olly Murs
- Caroline Flack
- Rita Ora
- Nick Grimshaw
- Simon Cowell
- Sinitta
