= Grumpy Old Women =

Television series

- Grumpy Old Women title card
- Created by: Judith Holder
- Starring: Jenny Eclair; Sheila Hancock; Jane Moore; Kathryn Flett
- Narrated by: Alison Steadman (series 1–2); Judith Holder (series 3)
- Country of origin: United Kingdom
- Original language: English
- No. of episodes: 13

Production
- Executive producer: Judith Holder
- Running time: 28 Minutes

Original release
- Network: BBC Two
- Release: 21 December 2004 – 24 August 2007

Grumpy Old Women is a British television series that continues in the same vein as its predecessor, Grumpy Old Men. Both programmes are shown on BBC Two. The first two series were narrated by Alison Steadman, and the third by Judith Holder (who is also the 'grumpy old woman' in the clips). The show began as a Christmas special, but due to its popularity, it led to a regular series, a book (see below), and a stage show.

== Narrators ==
Narrators	2004	2005	2006	2007
Alison Steadman	1 episode	4 episodes	4 episodes	
Judith Holder				4 episodes

== Contributors ==
Contributors	2004	2005	2006	2007
Lesley Joseph	1 episode			
Janet Street-Porter	1 episode			
Jenny Eclair	1 episode	4 episodes	4 episodes	4 episodes
Jane Moore	1 episode			
Linda Robson	1 episode			
Ann Widdecombe	1 episode			
Jenni Trent Hughes	1 episode			
Maureen Lipman	1 episode	4 episodes		
Dillie Keane	1 episode			
Arabella Weir	1 episode			
Germaine Greer	1 episode	4 episodes		
Sheila Hancock	1 episode	4 episodes		
Jilly Cooper	1 episode			
Kathryn Flett	1 episode			
Michele Hanson	1 episode			
Bonnie Greer		4 episodes		
India Knight		4 episodes		
Angie Le Mar		4 episodes		
Nina Myskow		4 episodes		
Stephanie Beacham				
Annette Crosbie				
Muriel Gray				
Indira Joshi				
Helen Lederer				
Aggie MacKenzie				
Esther Rantzen				
Pam St Clement				
Kim Woodburn				
Lynn Barber				4 episodes
Sheila Ferguson				4 episodes
Lynne Franks				4 episodes
Fiona Phillips				4 episodes
Charlie Hardwick				
Eve Pollard				4 episodes

== Episodes ==
=== Series One ===
Ep No	Prod Code	Original Air Date	Episode Title	Ratings
1x01	CHOL01	21 December 2004	The Christmas Special	8.9 Million (12% Of Share)
1x02	1GOWO01	25 February 2005	It's All Falling Apart	4.6 Million (7% Of Share)
1x03	1GOWO02	4 March 2005	Life's No Fun Anymore	5.2 Million (9% Of Share)
1x04	1GOWO03	11 March 2005	Boiling Point	6.7 Million (5% Of Share)
1x05	1GOWO04	18 March 2005	Stuck in the Middle	9.8 Million (14% Of Share)

=== Series Two ===
Ep No	Prod Code	Original Air Date	Episode Title	Ratings
2x01	2GOWO01	26 May 2006	Hard Work	3.4 Million (5% Of Share)
2x02	2GOWO02	2 June 2006	Call Me Old Fashioned	11.4 Million (18% Of Share)
2x03	2GOWO03	9 June 2006	Am I Bothered?	10.9 Million (16% Of Share)
2x04	2GOWO04	16 June 2006	High Anxiety	12.7 Million (14% Of Share)

=== Series Three ===
Ep No	Prod Code	Original Air Date	Episode Title	Ratings
3x01	3GOWO01	3 August 2007	It's Just Everything	
3x02	3GOWO02	10 August 2007	Beat The Clock	
3x03	3GOWO03	17 August 2007	My Family and Other Animals	
3x04	3GOWO04	24 August 2007	This Wasn't Going to Happen to You	

== Book reference ==
- Grumpy Old Women (2005) Judith Holder ISBN 0-563-52253-4

== Live Show ==
for more information, see Grumpy Old Women Live

In 2005, a live show was created, and went on a sold-out national tour, as well as a run in Australia.
