= Emily Atack =

English actress and comedian

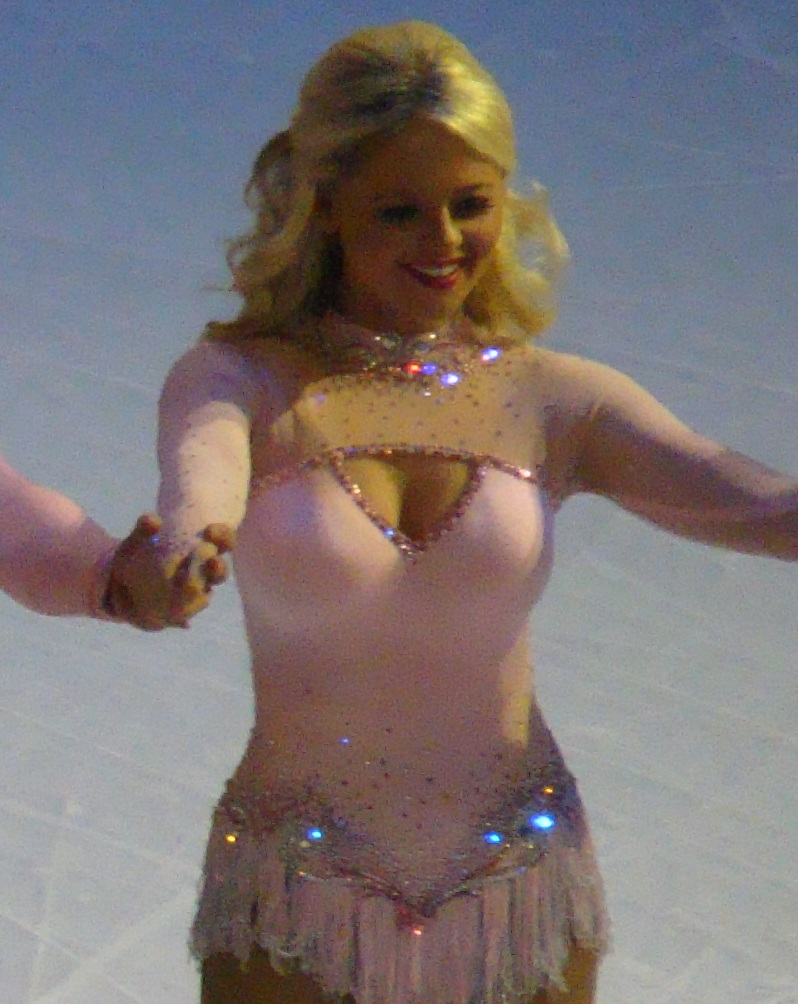
- Atack during the 2010 Dancing on Ice tour
- Born: Emily Jane Atack; 18 December 1989 (age 36); Luton, Bedfordshire, England
- Occupations: Actress; comedian; television personality; television presenter
- Years active: 2007–present
- Spouse: Alistair Garner (m. 2026)
- Children: 1
- Parents: Keith Atack (father); Kate Robbins (mother)
- Relatives: Ted Robbins (uncle); Amy Robbins (aunt); Simon Shelton (uncle); Ted Robbins (great-grandfather); Paul McCartney (first cousin twice removed)

Emily Jane Atack (born 18 December 1989) is an English actress, comedian, television personality and presenter. She played the role of Charlotte Hinchcliffe on the E4 comedy series The Inbetweeners (2008–2010), and appeared in Keith Lemon shows, such as Lemon La Vida Loca (2012), The Keith Lemon Sketch Show (2015), and The Keith & Paddy Picture Show (2017).

Atack appeared on the fifth series of Dancing on Ice in 2010. She was runner-up on the eighteenth series of I'm a Celebrity...Get Me Out of Here! in 2018, and went on to co-present the final series of its spin off show I'm a Celebrity: Extra Camp in 2019, as well as the ITV2 dating series Singletown. From 2020 to 2022, she starred in her own comedy series The Emily Atack Show. Since 2024, she has portrayed the role of Sarah Stratton in the Disney+ series Rivals. In 2026, she co-hosted the ITV1 series Nobody's Fool.

== Early life ==
Emily Jane Atack was born in Luton, Bedfordshire, on 18 December 1989, the daughter of actress Kate Robbins and musician Keith Atack, formerly of pop band Child. On her mother's side of the family, she is the first cousin twice removed of musician Paul McCartney, the niece of comedian Ted Robbins and actress Amy Robbins, and the niece by marriage of the late actor Simon Shelton, who died in 2018.

At the age of 16, Atack left school and moved to London, along with her sister Martha, and still lives there as of 2022.

== Career ==
=== Acting career ===
Atack rose to prominence portraying the role of Charlotte Hinchcliffe, known by the nickname "Big Jugs", in the E4 comedy series The Inbetweeners between 2008 and 2010. She went on to appear in films such as the remake of Dad's Army opposite Catherine Zeta-Jones and Bill Nighy. She appeared alongside Harvey Keitel and Gabriel Byrne in the British film Lies We Tell, and has performed in television programmes such as Rock and Chips (BBC), Little Crackers (Sky1), The Keith Lemon Sketch Show (ITV2) and Tracey Ullman's Show (BBC).

In May 2025, Atack starred as Alice, the wife of Monkey in an advert for PG Tips tea. Since 2024, she has portrayed the role of Sarah Stratton in the Disney+ series Rivals.

=== Other ventures ===
In 2010, Atack was a contestant on fifth series of Dancing on Ice. She was partnered with professional ice skater Fred Palascak and they were the eighth couple to be eliminated. In 2011, Atack presented a stylised public service announcement titled Ready, Steady, Drink, highlighting the dangers of drinking alcohol.

On 12 November 2018, Atack was confirmed to be participating in that year's series of I'm a Celebrity...Get Me Out of Here! She eventually finished in second place behind Harry Redknapp. She released her first book, Are We There Yet?: To indignity ... and beyond!, on 31 October 2019. In November 2019 she began co-hosting I'm a Celebrity: Extra Camp alongside Joel Dommett and Adam Thomas.

In 2020, Atack hosted in her own show on for three seasons on ITV2, named The Emily Atack Show, featuring a mixture of stand-up comedy, impressions, sketches, and stories about her life experiences, including dating, relationships and the pressures of social media and other topics of relevance to young women. The same year, she was a team captain on panel show Celebrity Juice working with Keith Lemon and Laura Whitmore.

In 2023, Atack presented the documentary Asking for It?, about her experiences of cyberflashing and sexual harassment, and talked about the explicit messages she was sent on social media. It aired on BBC Two on 31 January 2023.

== Personal life ==
In December 2023, Atack announced that she and her partner, Dr Alistair Garner, a materials scientist, were expecting their first child, having begun dating in 2022 after reconnecting as adults. She revealed on BBC Breakfast in March 2024 that they were having a boy. Their son, Barney James Garner, was born in June 2024. In July 2025, Atack announced her engagement to Garner.

In September 2025, Atack revealed that she had been sexually assaulted on multiple occasions throughout her career, including on set and at a wrap party.

On 22 August 2026, Atack married Garner, wearing a wedding gown by Avenue by Josephine Scott in collaboration with Evelie Bridal. On 12 September 2026, Atack and Garner went through a second church wedding in Mojacar, Spain, a town where in her youth she had spent summer holidays at her father's house nearby.

== Filmography ==
Year	Title	Role	Notes
2007	Blue Murder	Kelly Lang	1 episode
2008	Heartbeat	Cathy Dee	1 episode
2008–2010	The Inbetweeners	Charlotte Hinchcliffe	Regular role (6 episodes)
2009	Mid Life Christmas	Cranchesterford Teenager	TV film
2010	Dancing on Ice	Herself	Contestant
2010	Big Brother's Little Brother	Herself	Guest (1 episode)
2010	Rock & Chips	Marion	1 episode
2010	Little Crackers	Charlie	1 episode
2011	Ready, Steady... Drink	Herself	Presenter
2012	Outside Bet	Katie	Supporting role
2012	Britain Unzipped	Herself	Presenter
2012	Celebrity Juice	Herself	Panelist
2012	Me and Mrs Jones	Frosty Girl	1 episode
2012	Lemon La Vida Loca	Herself	1 episode
2012	Sunday Brunch	Herself	Guest (1 episode)
2013	Get Lucky	Bridget	Supporting role
2014	Almost Married	Lydia	Supporting role
2014	Unforgivable	Kirsty	Short film
2014	The Feeling Nuts Comedy Night	Herself	Guest performer
2015	The Hoarder	Molly	Main role
2015	The Keith Lemon Sketch Show	Various characters	Main roles (6 episodes)
2015	Celebrity Fifteen to One	Herself	Contestant (1 episode)
2016	Dad's Army	Daphne	Main role
2016	Broken Glass	Marie	Short film
2016	Zombie Spring Breakers	Liz	Supporting role
2016	Pointless Celebrities	Herself	Constestant (1 episode)
2016–2017	Tracey Ullman's Show	Various	Recurring roles (6 episodes)
2017	Father Brown	Fifi Caviara	1 episode
2017	Lost in Florence	Colleen	Supporting role
2017	The Keith and Paddy Picture Show	Slimer	1 episode
2017	Lies We Tell	Tracey	Supporting role
2017	Birds of a Feather	Jodie	1 episode
2017	Sky Comedy Christmas Shorts	Fran	1 episode
2018	Patrick	Becky	Supporting role
2018	Songbird (aka Alright Now)	Mandy	Supporting role
2018–2019	I'm a Celebrity... Get Me Out of Here!	Herself	Campmate (Runner-up)
2019	This Morning	Herself	Relief presenter
2019	Urban Myths	Debbie Harry	1 episode
2019	Iron Sky: The Coming Race	Tyler	Supporting role
2019	Shopping with Keith Lemon	Herself	Guest
2019	Emily Atack: Adulting	Herself	Presenter
2019	Celebrity Gogglebox	Herself	Regular
2019	Singletown	Herself	Presenter
2019	I'm a Celebrity: Extra Camp	Herself	Presenter
2019	8 Out of 10 Cats	Herself	Contestant (1 episode)
2019–2020	Almost Never	Meg	Regular role (20 episodes)
2020	The Understudy	Maxine Cole	Main role
2020	Ant & Dec's Saturday Night Takeaway	Herself	Men in Brown segments
2020	Sunday Brunch	Herself	Guest (1 episode)
2020	The Cube	Herself	Contestant (1 episode)
2020	The Jonathan Ross Show	Herself	Guest (Christmas Show)
2020–2022	Celebrity Juice	Herself	Team captain
2020–2022	The Emily Atack Show	Herself / Various	Main roles (18 episodes)
2021	Celebrity Catchphrase	Herself	Contestant (1 episode)
2021	Ant & Dec's Saturday Night Takeaway	Herself	Chums reunion
2021	Guessable	Herself	Guest (1 episode)
2022	Dark Cloud	AIDA	Supporting role
2022	Trailblazers: A Rocky Mountain Road Trip	Herself	Alongside Mel B & Ruby Wax
2023	Emily Atack: Asking for It?	Herself	Presenter
2023	Who Do You Think You Are?	Herself	1 episode
2024–present	Rivals	Sarah Stratton	8 episodes
2025	The Rumour	Debbie	5 episodes
2026	Nobody’s Fool	Co-host	With co-host Danny Dyer
TBA	Reputation	TBA	Upcoming legal drama

== Theatre credits ==
Year	Title	Role	Notes
2016	Breakfast at Tiffany's	Holly Golightly	UK tour
2019	Talk Thirty to Me	Herself	UK tour
2020	The Understudy	Maxine	Palace Theatre, London

== See also ==
- List of Dancing on Ice contestants
- List of I'm a Celebrity...Get Me Out of Here! (British TV series) contestants
