= Annastasia Baker =

British singer (born 1988)

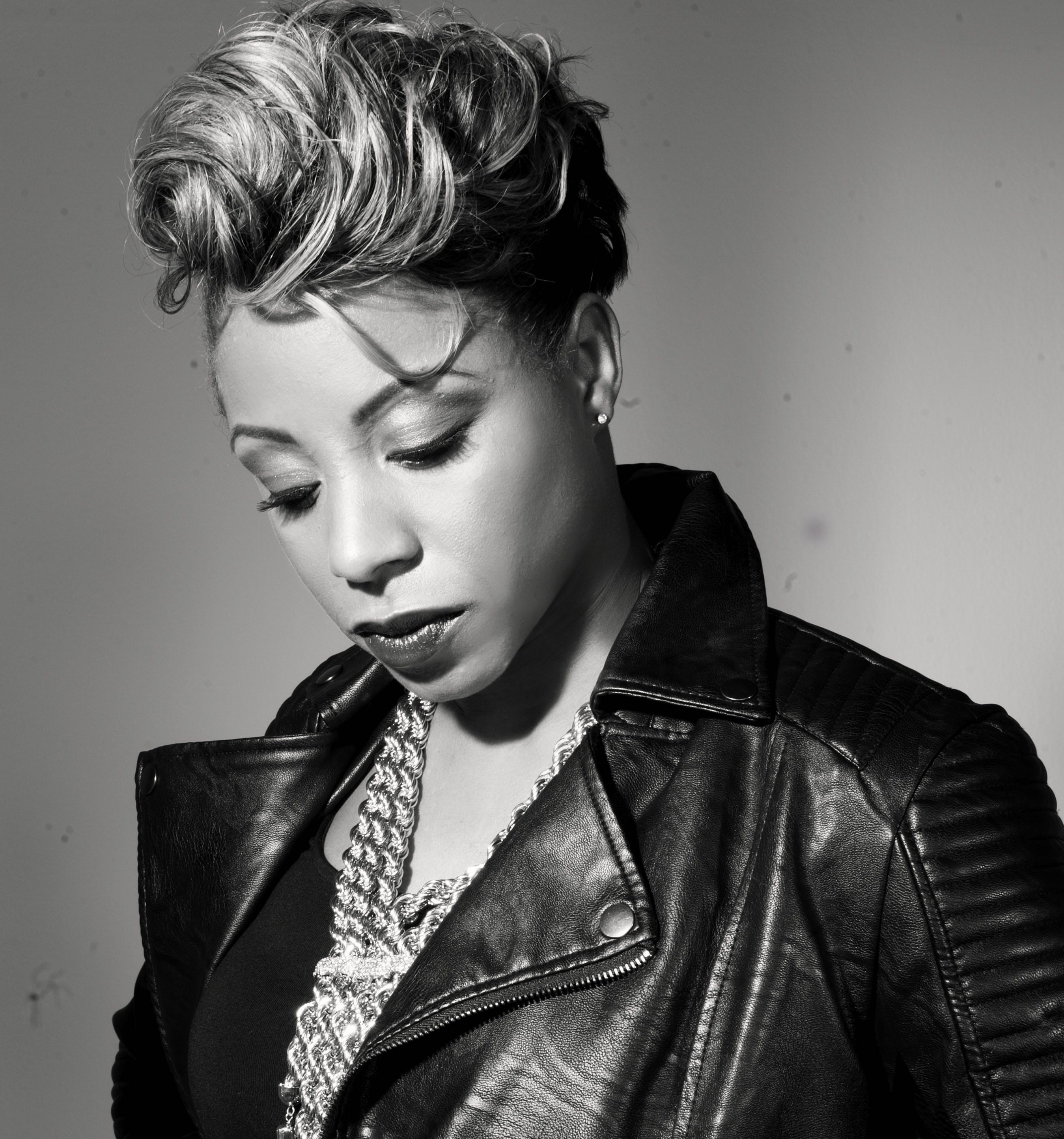
- Baker in 2013

Background information
- Born: 16 November 1988 (age 37); Mandeville, Middlesex County, Jamaica
- Genres: Gospel, R&B, soul
- Occupations: Singer, songwriter
- Years active: 2008–present
- Labels: T2S Records, Black Grape Records
- Website: AnnastasiaBaker.co.uk.

Annastasia Anneve Baker (born 16 November 1988) is a British gospel singer and songwriter. She first gained notice as a contestant who progressed into the top six female contestants (14 to 24 ladies) in the 2008 edition of The X Factor series 5. In 2010 she rose to the same level in series 7.

In 2013, Baker auditioned for and won the UK Gospel talent competition Time2shine.

On 24 December 2013, Baker launched the video to her first single release titled "First Love". This was followed on 15 June 2014 by the video for her second single release "Let Me Go". Touched by the tragedy of the Chibok schoolgirls kidnapping in Nigeria, this was Baker's contribution to the #bringbackourgirls awareness campaign.

Baker was invited to perform at Barbados Gospelfest, the Caribbean's premier Christian music and arts festival. She also completed the recording of her first album titled "You Turn" which was preview launched at London's Jazz Café to a sold-out audience on 14 September.

Baker was nominated for a MOBO Award in the "Best Gospel Act " category in September 2014.

== Early life ==
The oldest of four siblings, Baker was born in Mandeville, Jamaica, West Indies, but grew up in London.

== Career ==
During her time competing on The X Factor in 2008 and 2010, Baker was mentored by Cheryl Cole.

In 2013 Baker won the Time2shine gospel talent search competition and gained access to the development focus she had always craved to best hone her craft.

Baker undertook her first US tour during September 2014. As with her Jazz Cafe preview launch earlier that month, Baker performed songs from her upcoming album during this tour.

Baker was the Critics Choice Award winner, 2014, of the Gospel Touch Music Awards. GTMA is an organisation that celebrates the achievement of gospel artists.

Baker became a MOBO Award nominee in the Best Gospel Act category for 2014. In 2015 Anastasia Baker embarked upon a multiple date UK-wide tour, including an appearance at the Copper Box Arena supporting the US Gospel artist Kirk Franklin, culminating in her own headline date at the O2 Shepherds Bush Empire later that year.

In 2022, Baker was a contestant and finalist on the ITV talent show Starstruck, impersonating and performing as Tina Turner.

== You Turn (2015) ==
On 1 June 2015, Annastasia Baker released her debut album titled "You Turn". A single titled "First Love" was the lead track taken from the album and released some months in advance of this date. The album featured a duet with Sunday Best (TV series) winner Joshua Rogers who also appeared in the video for the track, filmed in Atlanta during Baker's US tour in September 2014.

| Preceded by Boma Diri | Time2shine winner Time2Shine (season 3) | Succeeded by Esther Farinde |
