= Tara Brown (disambiguation) =

Tara Brown (born 1968) is an Australian TV presenter.

Tara Brown may also refer to:

- Tara Brown (curler), Scottish curler
- Tara Brown (singer) (born 1984), British gospel and contemporary Christian singer
- Tara Brown (The Inbetweeners), a character from the British sitcom The Inbetweeners

== See also ==
- Tara Browne (1945–1966), Irish socialite, heir to the Guinness fortune
