= Sally Beamish =

British composer and violist (born 1956)

- Born: 26 August 1956 (age 70); London, England
- Genre: Classical
- Occupation: Composer
- Website: sallybeamish.com

Sarah Frances Beamish OBE (born 26 August 1956) is a British composer and violist. Her works include chamber, vocal, choral and orchestral music. She has also worked in theatre, film and television, as well as composing for children and for her local community.

== Early life and education ==
Sarah Frances Beamish was born on 26 August 1956 in London, to William Anthony Alten Beamish and Ursula Mary Beamish (née Snow). She attended Camden School for Girls and played in the National Youth Orchestra. She studied viola at the Royal Northern College of Music, where she received composition lessons from Anthony Gilbert and Lennox Berkeley. She later studied in Germany at the Hochschule für Musik Detmold, with the Italian violist Bruno Giuranna.

== Career ==
As a violist in the Raphael Ensemble, she recorded four discs of string sextets. However she made her mark as a composer, particularly after moving to Scotland. She has written a large amount of music for orchestra, including two symphonies and several concertos (for violin, viola, cello, oboe, saxophone, saxophone quartet, trumpet, percussion, flute and accordion), chamber and instrumental music, film scores, theatre music, and music for amateurs.

In September 1993, Beamish received the Paul Hamlyn Foundation Award for outstanding achievement in composition. In 1994 and 1995 she co-hosted the Scottish Chamber Orchestra (SCO) composers' course in Hoy with Sir Peter Maxwell Davies. From 1998 to 2002, she was composer in residence with the Swedish Chamber Orchestra and the SCO, for which she wrote four major works. Beamish won a 'Creative Scotland' Award from the Scottish Arts Council that enabled her to write her oratorio for the 2001 BBC Proms – the Knotgrass Elegy premiered by the BBC Symphony Orchestra and Chorus with Sir Andrew Davis.

Other works include three viola concerti, five string quartets, two percussion concerti (the second written for Colin Currie with the Scottish Chamber Orchestra, Stanford Lively Arts and the Bergen Symphony Orchestra and premiered in 2012), and works for traditional instruments, including a concerto for clàrsach and fiddle concerto premiered by Catriona Mackay and Chris Stout in 2012. In 2010, it was announced that Beamish had been selected as one of 20 composers to participate in the New Music 20x12 project as part of the London 2012 Cultural Olympiad. She composed a work for the Orchestra of the Age of Enlightenment to be premiered in 2012.

She has a series of recordings on the BIS label.

In December 2017, Northern Ballet premiered The Little Mermaid, a full-length ballet with her orchestral score.

In 2012, 2015 and again in 2026, she was featured as BBC Radio 3's Composer of the Week. In 2016, Beamish was elected a Fellow of the Royal Society of Edinburgh, Scotland's National Academy for science and the arts. She was presented with the 'Award for Inspiration' at the 2018 British Composer Awards and appointed Officer of the Order of the British Empire (OBE) in the 2020 Birthday Honours for services to music.

In 2020, Beamish composed April for Sound World’s Coronavirus Fund for Freelance Musicians, a project supporting struggling musicians during the UK's COVID-19 lockdown. Written in memory of Ellis Marsalis Jr. who had died of COVID-19 near the beginning of the pandemic, it was included on the album Reflections alongside specially written pieces by other composers such as Gavin Bryars, Mark-Anthony Turnage, Evelyn Glennie and Nico Muhly.

Her Nine Fragments – String Quartet No. 4 was the set repertoire for the Wigmore Hall International String Quartet Competition 2022.

She is a foreign member of the Royal Swedish Academy of Music.

In 2025 she was nominated for an Ivor Novello Award for her piece DISTANS for orchestra.

== Personal life ==
In 1988, she married Robert Irvine. They had three children. They separated in 2008. In 2019, she married Peter Thomson. She has lived in Brighton since 2018. She is a Quaker. Beamish has been formally diagnosed as autistic.

== Works ==
- The Lost Pibroch (1991) for the Scottish Chamber Orchestra
- Viola Concerto No 1 (1995) World Premier at BBC Proms 2 August 1995 soloist Philip Dukes with the London Mozart Players conducted by Matthias Bamert,
- Winter Journey (1996) and Mary's Precious Boy (1999) are Nativity musicals for pre-school and primary school children
- Monster (1996), an opera based on the life of Mary Shelley, commissioned by the Brighton Festival and Scottish Opera, with a libretto by Scottish novelist Janice Galloway
- Black, White and Blue (1997) for harpsichord and string quartet
- Caledonian Road (1997), commissioned by the Glasgow Chamber Orchestra
- The Day Dawn (1997), commissioned by Contemporary Music-Making for Amateurs
- No I'm Not Afraid (1998)
- Awuya (1998) for harp
- Four Findrinny Songs (1998)
- Sun and Moon (1999), an unpublished dance project for pre-school children, with choreography by Rosina Bonsu
- The Imagined Sound of Sun on Stone (1999) for soprano saxophone and chamber orchestra
- River (2000), cello concerto, inspired by the 1983 River anthology by Ted Hughes.
- Knotgrass Elegy (2001) commissioned by the BBC Proms
- The Naming of Birds (2001), wind quintet
- Viola Concerto No. 2 'The Seafarer' (2001), commissioned by Swedish and Scottish Chamber Orchestras, premiered by Tabea Zimmermann and the Scottish Chamber Orchestra/Joseph Swensen. It was part of the quarterfinal repertoire for the 2014 Primrose International Viola Competition.
- Trumpet concerto for Håkan Hardenberger and the National Youth Orchestra of Scotland, conducted by Martyn Brabbins, was performed at the Proms in 2003.
- Trance o Nicht (2004), a concerto for percussionist Evelyn Glennie, received its premiere in the Northern Lights Festival, Tromsø
- Flute concerto (2005), commissioned by the RSNO, was premiered and recorded by Sharon Bezaly in 2005
- Shenachie, a stage musical with writer Donald Goodbrand Saunders, about the Highlands of Scotland, premiered in Gartmore in May 2006.
- Under the Wing of the Rock (2006), a viola concerto, for Lawrence Power and the Scottish Ensemble.
- St. Catharine's Service (2006), Magnificat and Nunc Dimittis, commissioned for the choir of St Catharine's College, Cambridge.
- The Singing (2006), a concerto for classical accordion and orchestra, commissioned by the Cheltenham Festival and the Melbourne Symphony Orchestra with Beryl Calver Jones and Gerry Mattock. First performed by James Crabb and the Hallé Orchestra with Martyn Brabbins at the Cheltenham Festival, 2006
- The Lion & the Deer (2007), cycle of 14th century Iranian poems, commissioned for The Portsmouth Grammar School
- Suite pour Violoncelle et Orchestre (2007), commissioned for Steven Isserlis and the Saint Paul Chamber Orchestra
- A Cage of Doves (2007), commissioned by the Stavanger Symphony Orchestra
- Four Songs from Hafez (2007) for tenor and piano (also version for tenor and harp). Commissioned by Leeds Lieder. First performed by Mark Padmore and Roger Vignoles, Leeds 2007.
- Gerropaedie, for viola and harp (2008)
- Spinal Chords (2012).
- The King's Alchemist (2013) for string trio
- Equal Voices (2014) for orchestra, chorus, soprano and baritone. Commissioned by the London Symphony Orchestra with support from Susie Thomson, and the Royal Scottish National Orchestra. The Scottish premier was performed in November 2014 by the RSNO and RSNO Chorus.
- Intrada e Fuga (2015) for solo violin, commissioned by Fenella Humphreys.
- Glanz, for solo viola (2016)
- The Little Mermaid (2017), ballet commissioned by Northern Ballet
- Variation in Pictured Within (2019), variations on a theme composed one variation each by a total of 14 composers, played at the London Proms 13 August 2019
- April (2020) for alto saxophone, vibraphone and piano, released on Reflections by Sound World and the Bristol Ensemble. (Also version for viola and accordion)
- Night Songs, for speaker, viola and piano (2020)
- Sonnets (2020) for two pianos (6 hands) premiere 9 October 2021, broadcast BBC Radio 3 13 October 2021
- Crescent, for trumpet, viola and piano (2023)
- Trance (2023) for piano trio (in memory of the composer's mother), premiere Bantry 28 June 2023, broadcast BBC Radio 3 4 October 2023.
- First Peace, for solo trumpet (2024)

== Sources ==
- "Impulse classical music website: Sally Beamish". Archived from the original on 1 May 2006.
- "Scottish Music Centre: Sally Beamish". Archived from the original on 13 August 2006.
