= Gavin Bryars =

English composer (born 1943)

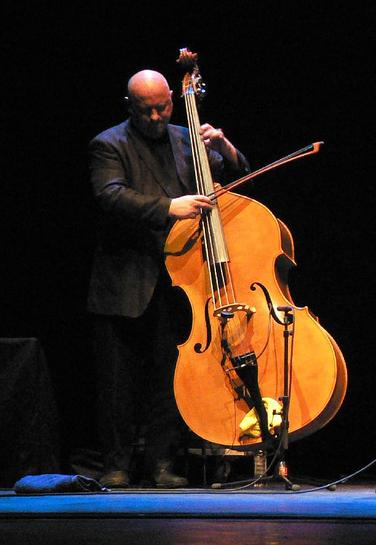
- Bryars in 2006

Background information
- Born: Richard Gavin Bryars; 16 January 1943 (age 83)
- Origin: Yorkshire, England
- Genres: Avant-garde, classical, pop, chamber, experimental
- Occupations: Musician, composer
- Instrument: Double bass
- Website: gavinbryars.com

Richard Gavin Bryars (/braɪərz/; born 16 January 1943) is an English composer and double bassist. He has worked in jazz, free improvisation, minimalism, historicism, avant-garde, and experimental music.

== Early life and career ==
Born on 16 January 1943 in Goole, in the East Riding of Yorkshire, England, Bryars attended Goole Grammar School. He studied philosophy at Sheffield University but became a jazz bassist during his three years as a philosophy student.

The first musical work for which he is remembered was his role as bassist in the trio Joseph Holbrooke, alongside guitarist Derek Bailey and drummer Tony Oxley. The trio began by playing relatively traditional jazz, touring with saxophonist Lee Konitz in 1966, before moving into free improvisation. Bryars became dissatisfied with this when he saw a young bassist (later revealed to be Johnny Dyani) play in a manner that seemed to him to be artificial, and he abandoned improvisation, becoming interested in composition instead. In 1998, the trio reformed briefly, giving two live performances and making recordings.

Bryars's first compositions owe much to the New York School of John Cage (with whom he briefly studied), Morton Feldman, Earle Brown, and minimalism. One of his earliest pieces, The Sinking of the Titanic (1969), is an indeterminist work that allows the performers to take a number of sound sources related to the sinking of the RMS Titanic and make them into a piece of music. The first recording of this piece appeared on Brian Eno's Obscure Records in 1975. The 1994 recording was remixed by Aphex Twin as Raising the Titanic (later collected on the 26 Mixes for Cash album). In 2012, the centenary of the Titanic's sinking, Bryars made a new extended version, with film projections by Bill Morrison and Laurie Olinder, that included his four children as a low-string ensemble (viola, 2 cellos, bass) and turntablist Philip Jeck, subsequently released on GB records (BCGBCD21 2013)

The Sinking of the Titanic
Sample of The Sinking of the Titanic by Gavin Bryars.

Another well-known early work of Bryars is Jesus' Blood Never Failed Me Yet (1971), which has as its basis a recorded loop of an old homeless man singing a musical fragment that the man had improvised. On top of that loop, rich harmonies played by a live ensemble are built, increasing in density, before the whole thing gradually fades out. A recording of this work was made in 1993 with Tom Waits singing along with the original recording of the homeless man during the final section.

Bryars was a founding member in May 1970 of the Portsmouth Sinfonia, an orchestra whose membership consisted of performers who "embrace the full range of musical competence", and which played popular classical works. Its members included Brian Eno, whose Obscure Records label would subsequently release works by Bryars. In one of the label's first three releases, Eno's album Discreet Music, Bryars conducted and co-arranged Three Variations on the Canon in D Major by Johann Pachelbel, which constitutes the second half of the album.

The 1992 composition A Man in a Room Gambling was written on commission from Artangel. Bryars' music is heard beneath monologues spoken by the Spanish artist Juan Muñoz, who talks about methods of cheating at card games (drawing on The Expert at the Card Table by S. W. Erdnase). The ten short works were played on BBC Radio 3 without any introductory announcements, and Bryars wrote that Muñoz hoped they would appear to the listener in a similar way to the Shipping Forecast, "bemused by this fleeting and perhaps enigmatic curiosity."

Bryars has written many other works, including five operas and many instrumental pieces, among the latter six string quartets and several concertos. He has written several pieces for dance, including Biped (1999) for Merce Cunningham, as well as works for William Forsythe, Carolyn Carlson, Édouard Lock and David Dawson. In 1981–1984, Bryars participated in the CIVIL warS, a vast, never-completed multimedia project by Robert Wilson, who also directed his first opera, Medea. His cello concerto Farewell to Philosophy was recorded in 1996 by Julian Lloyd Webber. He has also written a large body of vocal and choral music for groups such as the Hilliard Ensemble, the Latvian Radio Choir, the Estonian National Men's Choir, Red Byrd, Trio Mediaeval, Singer Pur, Nordic Voices and The Crossing, whose recording of "The Fifth Century" won a Grammy in 2019. He has written a great deal for early music performers including six books of madrigals, several works for viol consort, and a collection of 54 "laude" based on a 12th century manuscript.

Bryars' When Harry Met Addie (a tribute to jazz singer Adelaide Hall and saxophonist Harry Carney) was premiered at the Duke Ellington Memorial Concert at the Queen Elizabeth Hall, London, on 1 May 1999. The piece was performed by the London Sinfonietta Big Band and commissioned by the baritone saxophonist/bass clarinettist John Surman. Cristina Zavalloni sang the soprano and the London Sinfonietta Big Band was conducted by Diego Masson·

Bryars founded the music department at Leicester Polytechnic (now De Montfort University), and was Professor of Music there for several years. He left in 1994 to concentrate on composition and performance.

Since 1986, Bryars has run The Gavin Bryars Ensemble with his preferred musicians, consisting chiefly of low strings. Now, this regularly includes his children (2 cellos, piano and double bass).

Since 1974, Bryars has been a member of the Collège de 'Pataphysique and was elected Regent in 2001. In 2015 he was named Transcendent Satrap, the highest honour in the Collège, a position he shares with Marcel Duchamp, Man Ray, Eugène Ionesco, Umberto Eco, and others.

In 2020, Bryars composed Altissima Luce for Sound World’s Coronavirus Fund for Freelance Musicians, a project supporting struggling musicians during the UK’s Covid 19 lockdown. It was included on the album Reflections alongside specially written pieces by other composers such as Nico Muhly, Mark-Anthony Turnage, Evelyn Glennie, and Sally Beamish.

In 2023, Bryars collaborated with Goole band Sandra's Wedding on their EP "Another Rugby League Town".

Also in 2023, Bryars provided a special guest vocal for experimental composer Bill Vine's work, "Norwich Under the Water". The piece premiered at Norwich Cathedral in August 2023.

In November 2024, Bryars received the Ivor Novello Award for Innovation, presented in association with the Musicians' Union, at The Ivors Classical Awards.

== Personal life ==
Bryars lives in England, and, for part of the year, on the west coast of Canada. He is married to Anna Tchernakova, a Russian filmmaker, and has a stepdaughter and son. He also has two daughters from his first marriage.

== Selected works ==
- The Sinking of the Titanic (1969, first performance: Queen Elizabeth Hall, London, 1972)
- Necropolis, soundtrack for Franco Brocani film (1970)
- Jesus' Blood Never Failed Me Yet (for pre-recorded tape and ensemble), 1972
- My First Homage (1978, to Bill Evans, for 2 pianos, 2 vibraphones, tuba, and sizzle cymbal, recorded by Bryars and others in 1981)
- Medea (opera, libretto after Euripides), 1982, revised 1984 and 1995
- CIVIL WarS (incomplete opera collaboration with Robert Wilson), 1984. Some sections of the music exist in completed form, as follows:
  - On Photography for Chorus (SATB), harmonium, piano
  - 2B for Percussion ensemble
  - Arias For Marie Curie, The Queen of the Sea, Captain Nemo, The Japanese Bride
- String Quartet No. 1 Between the National and the Bristol, 1985
- Cadman Requiem (dedicated to Bill Cadman, his sound recordist, who perished in Pan Am 103), 1989
- String Quartet No. 2, 1990
- A Man in a Room, Gambling, for speaking voice and string quartet (text: Juan Muñoz), 1992
- The War in Heaven, cantata for soprano, counter tenor, chorus and orchestra
- The North Shore for viola and piano, 1993
- Three Elegies for Nine Clarinets, 1994
- Cello Concerto ("Farewell to Philosophy"), 1995
- Adnan Songbook, 1996
- Doctor Ox's Experiment, opera, 1998
- String Quartet No. 3, 1998
- Biped – music for the dance by Merce Cunningham, 1999
- When Harry Met Addie – music for soprano voice (vocalise) and big band, 1999
- Double Bass Concerto ("Farewell to St. Petersburg"), 2002
- G (Being the Confession and Last Testament of Johannes Gensfleisch, also known as Gutenberg, Master Printer, formerly of Strasbourg and Mainz), opera, 2002.
- I Have Heard It Said That a Spirit Enters, 2002
- Nothing like the Sun – 8 Shakespeare sonnets for soprano, tenor, speaking voice, eight instruments, 2007
- Piano Concerto ("The Solway Canal"), 2010
- Beckett Songbook – soprano, countertenor, electric guitar, viola, cello, and double bass, 2012
- Marilyn Forever – opera, 2013
- Hövdingar hittast (Heroes Meet), 2014 with Rúni Brattaberg (bass) and Eivør Pálsdóttir (soprano) – a collection of pieces based on Faroese and Icelandic sagas
- Pneuma – ballet, 2014, with Carolyn Carlson
- The Seasons – ballet, 2014, with Edouard Lock
- 11th Floor – ballet with Edouard Lock
- The Fifth Century – cantata for choir and saxophone quartet, text from Thomas Traherne, 2014
- The Heart of August – ballet with Eduard Lock
- The Collected Works of Billy the Kid, chamber opera, text by Michael Ondaatje, 2018
- Requiem – ballet with David Dawson Dutch National Ballet, for full orchestra, choir and four soloists, 2019
- A Native Hill – large a cappella choral work for The Crossing, setting Wendell Berry, 2019
- Altissima Luce – trio for bass-clarinet, viola and cello
- String Quartet No. 4, 2020
- Viola Concerto ("A Hut in Toyama"), 2021
- Wittgenstein Fragments for soprano, flute and string quartet, 2021
- In Là collaboration for installation with sculptor Massimo Bartolini, Prato, Italy, 2022
- String Sextet ("The Bridges of Könisberg"), 2022
- Three New Gnossiennes (after Satie) in memoriam Ornella Volta, 2022
- Harpsichord Concerto (Busoni's Chickering"), 2023
- The Bridges of Königsberg, 2023
- Harpsichord Quintet ("Mr Bryars, his sorrow, at Miss Bley, her passing"), 2024
- Due Qui with Yuri Bryars, installation with artist Massimo Bartolini for the 2024 Venice Biennale Italian Pavilion
- String Quartet No. 5 ("Madrigals") for soprano and quartet, 2024
- The Last Days of Immanuel Kant large – cantata for The Crossing, setting Thomas de Quincy, 2025
- Pythagorean Preludes and Fugues with Yuri Bryars, 2025

== Annexes ==
=== Bibliography ===
- Jean-Louis Tallon, Gavin Bryars, en paroles, en musique, le Mot et le reste, 2020 (ISBN 2361396173)
- David Wordsworth and Leslie East (editors), Gavin Bryars 2022 (ISBN 9780995757486)

=== Filmography ===
- Jacqueline Caux, Dolce voce, 2012
- ECM50 | 1990 Gavin Bryars (2019), a short film portrait of Gavin Bryars and his work with ECM Records, shot at his house in Leicestershire
