= Esther Farinde =

British gospel singer and songwriter

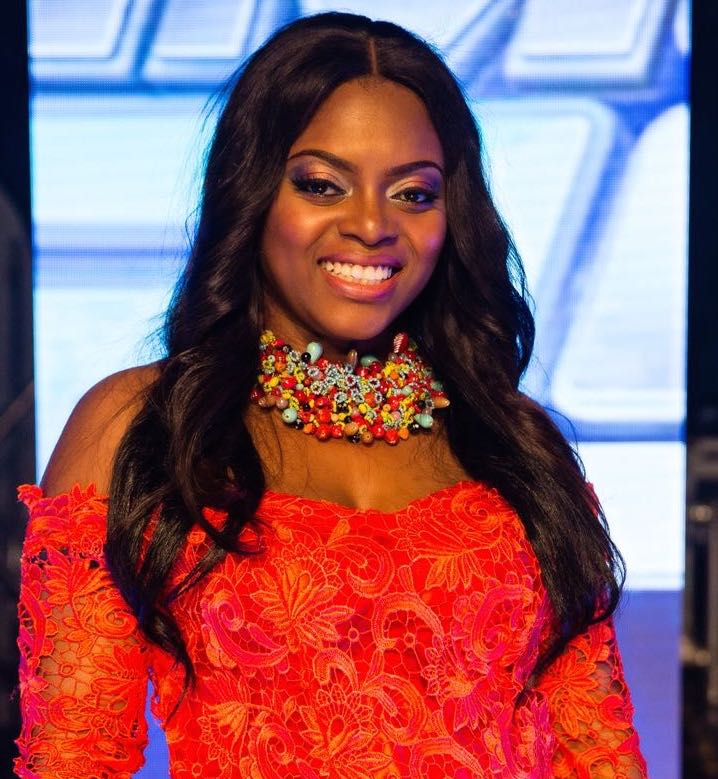
- Esther Farinde on winning Time2Shine Talent Search October 2014

Background information
- Born: Esther Toluwase; 19 February 1984 (age 42); Nigeria
- Genres: Gospel, Urban contemporary gospel, R&B, soul
- Occupations: Singer, songwriter
- Years active: 2006–present
- Labels: T2S Records, Black Grape Records

Esther Farinde (born 19 February 1984) is a British gospel singer and songwriter. She is also known as a Vocal Workshop Facilitator, who mentors young aspiring singers through her involvement with church choirs, as well as through projects such as RM19, run under the auspices of The Royal Opera House. Esther has also been involved in the delivery of music-based projects as a member of the Barbican Learning and Development team.

== Biography ==
Esther is the 7th of 10 children born to parents originally from Efon-Alaiye, in Ekiti State, in western Nigeria. Esther grew up in England, where she attended Ecclesbourne School, Islington Green School, and City and Islington College, (as did fellow artist Paloma Faith). Between 2003 and 2006, Esther attended The University of Northampton from which she graduated with a BA in Music and Media.

Esther began singing at the age of 4 in her parents' church; both her parents are pastors of the Christ Apostolic Church (CAC). For the past 18 years she has led choirs based in the church.

Esther Farinde was voted winner of the 2014 season of the Time2shine Gospel Talent search in the UK. The final was televised live from the Hackney Empire on 25 October 2014.

In 2018 she released her debut single 'Song Cry' after being taken on by the Time2Shine management team.
