= Sound World =

UK music charity founded in 2018

- Founded: 2018
- Type: Charity, no. 1178026
- Purpose: Music and education.
- Location: Bristol, U.K.
- Key people: Julian Leeks (Director) Sadie Harrison (Chair of Trustees)
- Website: www.sound-world.org

Sound World is a UK music charity founded in 2018. Its motto is “Great music for everyone” and it works primarily in the fields of music education, music outreach, concert promotion and commissioning. Its patrons include Dame Evelyn Glennie and Armando Iannucci and it was founded by British composer Julian Leeks.

Its first major project was “The Composing Club” which visited schools in disadvantaged areas around Bristol and Bath. It resulted in pupils having their own compositions performed and recorded by The Bristol Ensemble.

In 2019, Sound World created “In The Steps of Apollo” a music and planetarium show produced in collaboration with the planetarium at We The Curious, Bristol. It premièred on 20 July 2019, exactly 50 years after the Apollo 11 Moon landing.

In 2020, the Covid-19 pandemic saw all live music events in the UK postponed. Sound World responded with the Coronavirus Fund for Freelance Musicians, a crowdfunded project supporting freelance performers with “lockdown” recording work. Composers, including Steve Reich, Dame Evelyn Glennie, Nico Muhly, Graham Fitkin, Sadie Harrison, Gavin Bryars, Mark-Anthony Turnage, Michael Ellison, John Pickard, Geoff Poole, Howard Skempton, Sally Beamish and Julian Leeks, waived their commission fees and contributed specially written works which were then recorded by members of The Bristol Ensemble in lockdown.

The first release to come from the project was “The Grace of Silence” by Evelyn Glennie in January 2021. The album, called Reflections, was released on 8 December 2021 exactly one year after Margaret Keenan from the UK became the first person in the world to receive a Covid 19 vaccine outside of a clinical trial.

Sound World also holds an annual competition for young composers, the Sound World Young Composers’ Prize. With the 2020 and 2021 competition being cancelled due to the pandemic, the current holder of the prize is Jasper Eaglesfield who won with the piece “Birthday Letters.

In late 2024 Sound World began releasing a podcast series A land without music? The series addresses various aspects of music in the UK including the decline of music in state education and, what Sound World sees as, the failure of governments to recognise music's value or to provide adequate financial support. Guests are primarily drawn from the world of music, including Sound World patrons Dame Evelyn Glennie and composer John Pickard, along with Jörg Widmann (conductor, clarinetist and composer-in-residence for the Berlin Philharmonic Orchestra), Nico Muhly (US composer) and others. These are supplemented by expert contributors from other fields such as Prof Daisy Fancourt, director of the World Health Organization Centre on Arts & Health, and Dr Iain McGilchrist (neuroscience researcher, psychiatrist and author of The Master and His Emissary ).
