= John McLeod (composer) =

Scottish composer (1934–2022)

John McLeod CBE
- John McLeod (second left)
- Born: 8 March 1934; Aberdeen, Aberdeenshire, Scotland, UK
- Died: 24 March 2022 (aged 88); Edinburgh, Midlothian, Scotland, UK
- Education: Royal Academy of Music
- Occupation: Composer

John McLeod CBE (8 March 1934 – 24 March 2022) was a Scottish composer who wrote music in many media.

== Biography ==
He was born in Aberdeen, but later settled in Edinburgh. He initially studied clarinet at the Royal Academy of Music with Jack Brymer, Reginald Kell, and Gervase de Peyer, but then switched to composition with Sir Lennox Berkeley.

McLeod was Associate Composer of the Scottish Chamber Orchestra from 1980 to 1982 and the orchestra commissioned Out of the Silence, premiered in 2015. His works have also been performed by the Philharmonia Orchestra, the Halle Orchestra and the Royal Scottish National Orchestra. The BBC Scottish Symphony Orchestra has broadcast 12 of his major orchestral works, including the London premiere of The Sun Dances (2000) at the BBC Proms in 2014. The National Youth Orchestra of Scotland has regularly featured his work in over 20 concerts, including the Piano Concerto (1988) in 2015, when it was conducted by the composer with James Willshire as soloist in Glasgow and Dundee.

His Clarinet Concerto (2005) was premiered at the Queen's Hall in Edinburgh on 13 May 2007 by the Meadows Chamber Orchestra with soloist Jean Johnson.

Other notable orchestral works include the Percussion Concerto (1987) (written for, performed and recorded by Evelyn Glennie), Symphonies of Stone and Water (2000, for piano and small orchestra, written for and premiered by the Indonesian pianist & composer Ananda Sukarlan), the Guitar Concerto (2009) and the Viola Concerto (2018, written for Scottish Chamber Orchestra principal viola Jane Atkins). McLeod also composed choral music (including a Stabat Mater, 1985 and the cantata Chronicle of Saint Machar, 1998), chamber music (including A Moment in Time for violin, clarinet, cello and piano in 2002), and numerous songs and song cycles.

A double CD of his complete piano music was recorded live from four concerts at Stoller Hall in Manchester, August 2017. It includes the five piano sonatas (1978–2013), the Four Impromptus (1960), Five Hebridean Dances (1981), Two Balinese Rituals (written for Ananda Sukarlan) and the 12 Preludes (1984).

In 2014, McLeod was rewarded with a BASCA Gold Badge Award. This was in recognition of his unique contribution to music. He was appointed Commander of the Order of the British Empire (CBE) in the 2016 Birthday Honours for services to music.

John McLeod died in Edinburgh on 24 March 2022 aged 88, six months after the death of his wife Margaret (1936–2021), who was a respected piano adjudicator and examiner.
