= Jesus' Blood Never Failed Me Yet =

Composition by Gavin Bryars

Composition by Gavin Bryars
- Genre: Minimalism
- Length: 25', 40', 60', 74'
- Songwriter: unknown

Jesus' Blood Never Failed Me Yet is a 1971 composition by Gavin Bryars based on a loop of an unknown homeless man singing a brief improvised stanza. Rich harmonies, comprising string and brass, are gradually overlaid over the stanza. The piece was first recorded for use in a documentary which chronicles street life in and around Elephant and Castle and Waterloo, in London. When later listening to the recordings, Bryars noticed the clip was in tune with his piano and that it conveniently looped into 13 bars. For the first LP recording, he was limited to a duration of 25 minutes; later he completed a 60-minute version of the piece for cassette tape; and with the advent of the CD, a 74-minute version. It was shortlisted for the 1993 Mercury Prize.

Bryars says:

In 1971, when I lived in London, I was working with a friend, Alan Power, on a film about people living rough in the area around Elephant and Castle and Waterloo Station. In the course of being filmed, some people broke into drunken song – sometimes bits of opera, sometimes sentimental ballads – and one, who in fact did not drink, sang a religious song "Jesus' Blood Never Failed Me Yet". This was not ultimately used in the film and I was given all the unused sections of tape, including this one.

When I played it at home, I found that his singing was in tune with my piano, and I improvised a simple accompaniment. I noticed, too, that the first section of the song – 13 bars in length – formed an effective loop which repeated in a slightly unpredictable way [in the notes for the 1993 recording on Point, Bryars wrote that while the singer's pitch was quite accurate, his sense of tempo was irregular]. I took the tape loop to Leicester, where I was working in the Fine Art Department, and copied the loop onto a continuous reel of tape, thinking about perhaps adding an orchestrated accompaniment to this. The door of the recording room opened on to one of the large painting studios and I left the tape copying, with the door open, while I went to have a cup of coffee. When I came back I found the normally lively room unnaturally subdued. People were moving about much more slowly than usual and a few were sitting alone, quietly weeping.

I was puzzled until I realised that the tape was still playing and that they had been overcome by the old man's singing. This convinced me of the emotional power of the music and of the possibilities offered by adding a simple, though gradually evolving, orchestral accompaniment that respected the homeless man's nobility and simple faith. Although he died before he could hear what I had done with his singing, the piece remains as an eloquent, but understated testimony to his spirit and optimism."

The identity of the singer is unknown, although he is believed to have died before the composition became famous. Archival searches have failed to find evidence of the existence of lyrics before the record was released, and it is believed to be an original text by the singer.

== Versions ==
The original 25-minute version of the piece was first performed by the Music Now Ensemble, conducted by Bryars, at the Queen Elizabeth Hall in December 1972, and recorded for Brian Eno's Obscure label in 1975. In 1990 the Gavin Bryars ensemble recorded a 60-minute version in a restored water-tower in Bourges, France, for Les Disques du Crepuscule. A 74-minute version was recorded in 1993 for the Point label with Tom Waits adding his voice in the later sections to that of the homeless man.

In 2019 Bryars released, on GB Records, a live, 25-minute version with his ensemble, which included all four of his children.

In 1981, choreographer Maguy Marin used the piece as the score for her Beckett-inspired work May B.

In 1993, William Forsythe used the piece as the score for his 25-minute work Quintett for the Frankfurt Ballet. The piece has subsequently been performed by several other dance companies.

In 2003, Christian band Jars of Clay covered it on their sixth full-length studio album Who We Are Instead on Essential Records.

In 2006, Art of Time Ensemble released a 16-minute version on their debut album Live In Toronto.

In 2011, The Music Tapes performed a cover of this piece using Bryars' original tape sample for NPR's Tiny Desk Concert series.

In 2018 a parody of the piece called "My'ol Beef Pal" was played in Episode 35 of the Beef and Dairy Network podcast about the contribution of cows in war, in which the social anthropologist Willard Rudman claimed it was sung in the trenches.

In April 2019, a 12-hour overnight version was performed in London's Tate Modern art gallery, directed by Gavin Bryars. Performers included two groups of homeless people (one vocal, one instrumental), together with the Academy of St Martin in the Fields, the Southbank Sinfonia, and Bryars' own ensemble.

A version of the piece was released by Kristin Hayter on her compilation SAVED! The Index in 2024.
