= Touch the Sound (soundtrack) =

Soundtrack album by Evelyn Glennie
- Released: 2004
- Genre: Experimental music, free improvisation
- Length: 60:06
- Label: Normal (Germany)
- Producer: Filmquadrat (Munich), Skyline (Edinburgh)

Evelyn Glennie chronology
Shadow Behind the Iron Sun (1999)	Touch the Sound (2004)

Touch the Sound is a soundtrack by Scottish percussionist Evelyn Glennie of the 2004 documentary film Touch the Sound by German filmmaker Thomas Riedelsheimer about Glennie, who is profoundly deaf. It was released on CD in 2004 by German record label, Normal.

The soundtrack consists of musical improvisations by Glennie, solo and with other musicians, including English experimental musician Fred Frith. Glennie and Frith were filmed improvising in an abandoned sugar factory in Dormagen, Germany, and six of the tracks on the soundtrack were recorded in the factory. In 2007 Frith and Glennie released an album, The Sugar Factory which used material from those sessions.

== Reception ==
Professional ratings
Review scores
Source	Rating
AllMusic	4/5 stars

In a review at AllMusic, Stephen Eddins gave the soundtrack four stars out of five, and said that "This is not a recording in which Glennie's virtuosity is on display, but one that showcases her sensitivity to the world around her, and that's a wonderful thing to hear."

== Track listing ==
No.	Title	Performer	Length
1.	"Warm Up" (Glennie/Frith)	Evelyn Glennie, Fred Frith	3:34
2.	"Tam Tam Wave" (Glennie/Frith)	Glennie, Frith	3:06
3.	"New York Sounds"	–recorded sounds–	2:08
4.	"Tapdance" (Glennie)	Glennie, Roxanne Butterfly	1:25
5.	"Airport Rhythm"	–recorded sounds–	0:57
6.	"Central Snare" (Glennie)	Glennie	2:11
7.	"Arriving" (Glennie/Frith)	Glennie, Frith	1:32
8.	"Sound Check" (Glennie/Frith)	Glennie, Frith	4:03
9.	"Silence"	–recorded sounds–	2:32
10.	"Breath" (Glennie)	Glennie	0:58
11.	"Taiko" (Glennie/Ondekoza)	Glennie, Ondekoza	4:50
12.	"Tokyo Voices"	–recorded sounds–	0:57
13.	"Metal" (Glennie)	Glennie	1:50
14.	"Drums 'N' Guitar" (Glennie/Frith)	Glennie, Frith	3:25
15.	"Tokyo Night"	–recorded sounds–	2:01
16.	"Chopstick Solo" (Glennie)	Glennie	1:02
17.	"Marim-Bar" (Glennie/Misa/Saikou)	Glennie, Misa This, Saikou This	2:13
18.	"Memories" (Glennie/Frith)	Glennie, Frith	2:36
19.	"A Little Prayer" (Glennie/Frith)	Glennie, Frith	5:53
20.	"Seaside" (Glennie/Jason)	Glennie, Jason "The Fogmaster"	2:56
21.	"In The Womb" (Glennie)	Glennie	1:11
22.	"Hell's Kitchen" (Glennie/Hernandez)	Glennie, Horacio "El Negro" Hernandez	3:11
23.	"The Way" (Abe)	Glennie	5:35

Source: Soundtrack liner notes.

== Personnel ==
- Fred Frith – bass guitar, guitar, percussion, vocals
- Evelyn Glennie – drums, snare drum, marimba, percussion, sheet metal, tom-tom, waterphone, wind whistle
- Horacio "El Negro" Hernandez – drums
- Ondekoza – drums, taiko
- Misa This – piano
- Saikou This – violin
- Jason "The Fogmaster" – foghorns
- Roxane Butterfly – tap dancing

Source: AllMusic, Discogs

=== Production ===
- Location sound engineering by Gregor Kuschel and Marc von Stuerler
- Sugar factory recording (tracks 1, 2, 7, 8, 14, 19) by Jörg T. Schnabel and Patrik Höderrath
- Sound Editing by Christoph von Schoenburg
- Mixing by Hubertus Rath
- Produced by Filmquadrat Munich and Skyline Edinburgh
- Liner notes by Thomas Riedelsheimer

Source: AllMusic, Discogs
