= Time2Shine =

Time2Shine Gospel Talent Search was a UK gospel-based singing and music performance competition featuring auditions and a live final, all of which were recorded for transmission on the Sky platform.

The series premiered in 2011 and has been televised from the outset. Time2Shine Gospel Talent Search is the brainchild of MercyB, gospel singer, songwriter and entrepreneur, who is also the executive producer of the series.

== Format ==
The Time2Shine Gospel Talent Search attracts unsigned, unmanaged musicians, groups or solo vocalists who are looking to establish a career as a gospel artist, whilst remaining true to their Christian faith. The competition process takes contestants through four distinct stages.

=== Auditions ===
Hopeful contestants apply online for auditions which are held in London, Birmingham and Manchester. At these auditions the judging panel filters and selects the best performances seen on the day. Those selected are invited to attend the call-back.

=== Call-back ===
At the call-back stage the best acts from regional auditions meet in London to compete. Those who make it past this stage will be awarded with a place at Time2Shine Gospel Talent Search boot-camp.

=== "BootCamp" ===
A place at "bootcamp" means each contestant is just one step away from becoming a Time2Shine series winner. At "bootcamp" they have access to vocal coaching and receive guidance on stage presence and presentation. The contestants also gain insight as to the business of entertainment and performance, receiving support towards developing their craft.

Each contestant also gets the opportunity to record their version of a specified song. If successful in going forward, they get to perform this song during the selection process at the live final.

=== Final ===
Live finals for Time2Shine Gospel Talent Search 2013 were held at the indigO2 at The O2 on Sunday 13 October. The 2014 finals were held at the Hackney Empire on Saturday 25 October. Both occasions were transmitted live on OHTV, (Sky 199). The OHTV Network reaches in excess of 25 million people per month via its international platform, 700,000 per month in the UK and a further five million people in China via 3G. The winning contestant was Annastasia Baker, chosen based upon a combination of votes from both the judges and the audience. The winner received a prize package valued at £100,000.

=== Winner's Prize ===
This package includes a £10,000 cash prize, a management contract, a recording contract to include the production of an album, a photo-shoot, performance at the Barbados Gospel Festival and their own album launch concert.

== Time2Shine judges ==
=== 2013: Season 3 ===
- MercyB: A gospel singer and songwriter and a "Wise Woman Award" nominee, MercyB is also recognised for her acumen as a business woman. She is the pioneering entrepreneur seriously investing in gospel music as founder of the Time2Shine Ministry. MercyB is a unifying force on the Time2Shine Gospel Talent Search panel of judges.
- Angie Le Mar
- Mark Beswick
- Guvna B
- Robbie Ringwood: Bringing over 25 years of management experience in the music/entertainment industry to the judges' desk, Robbie Ringwood's clients have included some of the UK's top female vocalists in the RnB/Soul genre such as Mica Paris, Shola Ama, Kele Le Roc, Joy Malcolm, Kym Mazelle, Christina Novelli, as well as a host of other celebrities. His work for television includes documentaries such as At Home with the Eubanks and There's Something About Geri. Robbie was instrumental in the initial concept and development of Music Unsigned, one of the first music websites in the UK to promote unsigned acts.
- Steve Alexander Smith (guest judge): Author of the groundbreaking book British Black Gospel, Smith appeared as a guest judge in the second series of the competition. He was once quoted as stating that his book did not cover a gap in the market, but a market in the gap. He is a freelance writer and regular contributor to on-line MOBO Awards magazine Mobo.com.

=== 2014: Season 4 ===
- MercyB
- Guvna B
- Angel: Original member of Grammy-nominated US gospel group Trin-i-tee 5:7
- Clive Ennis: Prominent gospel artist agent from the US
- Rudolph Walker (guest judge): at the Live Finals

== Presenters ==
- Series 1: Josie d'Arby
- Series 2: Josie d'Arby
- Series 3: Diane-Louise Jordan
- Series 4: Richard Blackwood

== Past Time2Shine winners ==
- 2011: Divine Divine
- 2012: Boma Diri
- 2013: Annastasia Baker
- 2014: Esther Farinde

== See also ==
- UK Gospel
