= Touch the Sound =

2004 film by Thomas Riedelsheimer

- 2004 German film poster
- Directed by: Thomas Riedelsheimer
- Written by: Thomas Riedelsheimer
- Produced by: Leslie Hills; Stefan Tolz; Trevor Davies
- Starring: Evelyn Glennie; Fred Frith
- Cinematography: Thomas Riedelsheimer
- Edited by: Thomas Riedelsheimer
- Music by: Evelyn Glennie; Fred Frith
- Distributed by: Piffl Medien GmbH (Germany)
- Release date: 4 November 2004 (Germany)
- Running time: 99 min.
- Countries: Germany; United Kingdom
- Language: English

Touch the Sound: A Sound Journey with Evelyn Glennie is a 2004 German documentary film directed by Thomas Riedelsheimer about profoundly deaf Scottish classical percussionist Evelyn Glennie. In the film Glennie, who won a Grammy Award in 1989, collaborates with English experimental musician Fred Frith and others, and explains how she perceives sound. The film appeared at over 20 film festivals across the world, and won several awards, including "Best Documentary" at the 2004 BAFTA Awards, Scotland.

A soundtrack of Touch the Sound featuring Glennie and Frith, plus additional music and sounds from the film, was released in 2004. An album based on Glennie and Frith's performances in the film entitled The Sugar Factory was released in 2007.

== Background ==
German filmmaker Thomas Riedelsheimer's previous film Rivers and Tides (2001) received several awards, including Best Documentary awards by the German Film Critics Association, the San Diego Film Critics Society and the San Francisco Film Critics Circle. The soundtrack of the film was composed and performed by English experimental musician Fred Frith.

In 2003 Riedelsheimer asked Frith to perform with Scottish percussionist Evelyn Glennie in Touch the Sound. The venue was an abandoned sugar factory in Dormagen, Germany, and their performance was filmed under the pretext of "making a record". Frith and Glennie had never worked together before and their entire performance was improvised. For the purpose of the documentary the musicians performed 100 feet (30 m) apart in the huge empty factory, which Frith said "was great visually, but limited in other ways".

In addition to appearing on the soundtrack of Touch the Sound, music from Frith and Glennie's performance in the sugar factory was later reworked and released by the pair on a CD in 2007 entitled The Sugar Factory.

Riedelsheimer explained why he chose to create a film about Glennie: "I was so struck by her. What was amazing was not so much the music itself but the way she is in it. That finally became the subject – not music, but sound and the ability to feel the sounds around us." He said that the "biggest challenge" of the project was to "transfer acoustics or sound ideas into images" and "to find images that are metaphors for these sounds". Riedelsheimer did not want to make a film about a deaf person who succeeds as a musician, he wanted a film about the physical nature of sound, something that can be felt, and Glennie was ideal to demonstrate it. The film took three years to make, one year to raise money, one year filming at 16 locations around the world, and another year editing the results in post-production. It was shot on 16 mm film with one microphone and one camera, and later blown up to 35 mm during editing.

== Synopsis ==
"Hearing is a form of touch. You feel it through your body, and sometimes it almost hits your face."

— Evelyn Glennie in Touch the Sound

Touch the Sound explores Evelyn Glennie's career as a musician and how, despite being profoundly deaf, she is able to perceive sounds other than with her ears. Glennie explains how a neurological disorder struck her as a child, and by the age of eight, soon after she had started to play the piano, she began to lose her hearing. When she was 13 an audiologist said it was no longer possible for her to play music and suggested she be moved to a school for the deaf. But Glennie remained at her school, and switched from piano to percussion, the vibrations of which, she discovered, she could sense with her sense of touch. Glennie developed this ability to feel sound and later went on to become "one of the world's foremost solo percussionists".

In the film Glennie performs and is interviewed at several locations around the world. She visits the farm in Aberdeenshire, Scotland where she grew up, and reminisces on her childhood and how she overcame her hearing loss. She collaborates with English experimental musician Fred Frith in an abandoned sugar factory in Dormagen, Germany, as they record a CD together. She also plays snare drums in Grand Central Station in Manhattan, performs with Cuban percussionist Horacio "El Negro" Hernandez on a New York City rooftop, and performs with Ondekoza, a taiko drum troupe in Japan.

== Reception ==
Touch the Sound was generally well received by critics, with Allmovie giving it four stars out of five, and scoring 75 at Metacritic.com.

Boston Globe film critic Ty Burr called Touch the Sound "a documentary of immense and mysterious power" that enables us to hear what Glennie hears. Los Angeles Times film critic Kenneth Turan said the film is a "potent and imaginative creative biography" of Glennie that successfully conveys her perception of the world to audiences. He described the sugar factory improvisations as a "mesmerizing interplay of sounds", and called it the film's "central event". Film critic Stephen Holden writing in a review in The New York Times, called the film an "impressionistic documentary" and a "mystical exploration of the sensory world" of Glennie. Holden said the film is "a duet within a duet": Glennie's collaboration with Fred Frith, and her collaboration with filmmaker Thomas Riedelsheimer.

Music critic Tim Page said in The Washington Post that Touch the Sound is "at its best" when Glennie is making music, but criticised the film for its "vacuous" interviews with her, who he felt, "seems positively incapable of saying anything substantial". Page also complained about the amount of filler in the film, and that "most of the music [is not] very good", although he did like Glennie's final collaboration with Frith where, after the "usual 'free jazz' shtick", they "suddenly [...] find a point of agreement". But Page did feel that Glennie's achievements are "little short of miraculous, and that human victory is ultimately the best news one takes away from Touch the Sound."

== Controversy ==
Touch the Sound was released without subtitles, making a film about a profoundly deaf musician inaccessible to those with hearing loss. Riedelsheimer was said to oppose subtitles because "they would affect his visual compositions."

== Awards ==
Touch the Sound has won five awards.

- 2004 – "Best Documentary", BAFTA Awards, Scotland
- 2004 – "Golden Dove for Long Footage", Leipzig DOK Festival
- 2004 – "Critics Week Award", Locarno International Film Festival
- 2005 – "Special Mention for Best Documentary", Bangkok International Film Festival
- 2005 – "Film Award in Gold for Best Sound", German Film Awards

== Soundtrack ==
A soundtrack of Touch the Sound by Evelyn Glennie was released on CD in 2004.

== See also ==
- List of films featuring the deaf and hard of hearing
