= Jordan Kensington =

British serial Entrepreneur, artist, actor, songwriter, television

Jordan Kensington is a British serial Entrepreneur, artist, actor, songwriter, television and radio presenter best known as the founder of the Urban Music Awards, an awards show celebrating the achievement of hip hop, R&B, soul and jazz music artists in six countries annually. He also designed, created and developed a brand of smart phones and tablet PCs called Zuricom.

His business interests under the umbrella of Invincible Republic Group include Urban Music Awards, a magazine, radio station, television production company, record label, celebrity management agency and a primary school and college. He has taken the roles of recording executive, actor, musician, executive producer of Sky TV's Britain's Next Urban Superstar, writer, radio presenter and presented one report for the BBC 1 local news strand Inside Out.

== Early years ==
Jordan Kensington was born in Wandsworth, London, the son of Emmanuel Kensington and Agnes Makia. Kensington attended South Thames College and later studied law at London South Bank University.

== Establishing Invincible Media Group ==
After finishing university, Kensington sold his house and with support from the Prince's Trust went on to set Invincible Media Group in 1999. The magazine reportedly saw a circulation of 65,000 copies distributed monthly in the UK giving exposure to several first time artist such as Dizzee Rascal, M.I.A, Joss Stone, Twista, Eminem and many more. In 2002 the company launched a radio station, production company and a celebrity management arm to further maximise the brand Invincible and 2003 saw the launch of the Urban Music Awards. The awards show spun off an events production arm to the company that led to the launch of British Music Week in 2005 and more recently the International Football Awards held in 2009. The Urban Music Awards returned bigger and better in 2009 by celebrating the 7th anniversary with a US version of the awards show on 17 July 2009 at the Hammerstein Ballroom in New York City, returning to London on 1 November for the British version of the show. The 2009 return was covered by major international press, including OK! magazine, the Daily Express and The Insider. 2009 also saw the launch of the Best Asian Act category to celebrate artists and musicians of Asian origin, which was widely covered within the Asian media worldwide.

=== Other ventures ===
In addition to his media business, Kensington owns a university and a college located in Cameroon and St. Lucia. The college which is part of the family business and founded by his mother is called Mother Teresa College, named after the legendary philanthropist Mother Teresa of Calcutta. The current college is in Cameroon, while the university founded by Jordan is called Mokingo University and focuses on Business and Media. Kensington's interest in education has meant that he is constantly being booked to speak and offer motivational seminars in universities, colleges and businesses.

On 22 April 2007, Kensington inked a six-figure deal with leading shoe brand Kickers. The agreement saw a special Invincible shoe created, sold and endorsed by several celebrities. As well as working on sponsorship and marketing for brands such as Timberland, Samsung Mobile, Sony BMG and Warner Music Kensington signed off a two-year deal with the world's biggest sports retailer Foot Locker in 2007.

In 2006, Kensington was named Ambassador for the government-based campaign Make your Mark, and was announced as an honorary VIP member of the BlackBerry VIP Entrepreneurs network. He came into controversy in 2005 when he criticised the Brit Awards for failing to recognise artists in Britain from different nationalities and his comments were featured on major networks including BBC 24 News.

In 2007, Kensington gave a 30-minute interview with Jim Boulden of CNN to celebrate the launch of his brand new USA-based newspaper in New York and in 2008 he gave UK HipHop magazine a no-holds-barred interview about his life, dreams and beliefs.

He is behind one of Africa's fastest growing fin-tech banks Moneeys, which launched as Zuricom Money and later changed names to Moneeys, Forbes Magazine.

== Awards and nominations ==
- International Dance Awards 2001 (Best Artist, 2001)
- Carlton TV's Multicultultural Award (Best Publisher 2003)

== See also ==
- Invincible Media Group
- Urban Music Awards
