= The Sugar Factory (album) =

Studio album by Fred Frith and Evelyn Glennie
- Released: 28 August 2007
- Recorded: July 2003 and October 2006
- Studio: ZuckerFabrik, Dormagen, Germany
- Genre: Experimental music, free improvisation
- Length: 48:57
- Label: Tzadik (US)
- Producer: Fred Frith

Fred Frith chronology
Cutter Heads (2007)	The Sugar Factory (2007)	Back to Life (2008)

The Sugar Factory is a 2007 collaborative album by English experimental musician Fred Frith and Scottish percussionist Evelyn Glennie. It comprises material drawn from improvisations by Frith and Glennie recorded during the making of the 2004 documentary film Touch the Sound about Glennie, who is profoundly deaf. The album was released in 2007 in the United States by Tzadik Records as part of their "Key Series".

A soundtrack of the film was released in 2004, which contains some of Frith and Glennie's improvisations, plus additional music and sounds from the film.

== Background ==
Touch the Sound is a documentary film by German filmmaker Thomas Riedelsheimer about profoundly deaf Scottish percussionist Evelyn Glennie and how she hears with her body. In 2003 Riedelsheimer asked English experimental musician Fred Frith to perform with Glennie in the film; Frith had previously worked with Riedelsheimer on the soundtrack for his 2001 documentary, Rivers and Tides. Frith and Glennie performed in an abandoned sugar factory in Dormagen, Germany in July 2003, and were filmed under the pretext of "making a record". This was the first time that Frith and Glennie had worked together, and their entire performance was improvised. For the purpose of the documentary the musicians performed 100 feet (30 m) apart in the huge empty factory, which Frith said "was great visually, but limited in other ways".

In addition to being filmed, their performance was also recorded on a 48-track digital recorder. Frith later worked on the recordings over the next few years in Oakland, California, extracting and reorganising the material and sending the results to Glennie for approval. Frith and Glennie also each made additional recordings which were added to the mix. Of the album, Frith said, "Part of the challenge lay in the fact that since we had performed in a vast empty building there was a cathedral of reverb on everything we did, reverb that could not be removed. [...] So the Sugar Factory imposed its will on us, and we learned to accept and enjoy the music for what it was."

Since The Sugar Factory sessions, Frith and Glennie have performed live together on several occasions. Frith said that "A language is developing between us, and every concert brings new discoveries."

== Reception ==
Professional ratings
Review scores
Source	Rating
All About Jazz	favorable
AllMusic	4/5 stars

Martin Longley writing at All About Jazz called the album "a sonic pleasure" and said that Frith and Glennie are "beautifully recorded in the cathedral space of [the] disused sugar factory". In a review in The Squid's Ear, Kurt Gottschalk called the album "a beautiful session, full of the sense of the room they recorded it in, abstract and lush". He said that Frith's "tasteful looping, [...] building of soundscapes and his searing solos sound great in the big space", and that Glennie "walks a fine balance between challenge and response". Gottschalk said that "the mix is totally satisfying".

Thom Jurek at AllMusic described the album as "a listening experience unlike anything else". He said that listeners familiar with Frith's improvising will find it fascinating, but Glennie fans may be in for a surprise. She is "noisier" here than usual, but Jurek added that the "cacophony" the pair create is "compelling", at times "blisslike", and that "every sound that emerges becomes a part of the bigger body of the work".

== Track listing ==
All tracks composed by Fred Frith and Evelyn Glennie, except where noted.

1. "A Route of Wolves, improvisation for 2 players" – 7:43
2. "In the World to Change the World, improvisation for 2 players" – 7:54
3. "A Rag of Colts, improvisation for 2 players" – 4:13
4. "Scuttlebut, improvisation for 2 players" – 6:07
5. "A Cast of Hawks, improvisation for 2 players" – 7:55
6. "Walls are Loosening" (Frith, Glennie) / "A Little Prayer" (Glennie) – 15:05

Source: AllMusic

== Personnel ==
- Fred Frith – electric guitar, bass guitar, organ, metal objects
- Evelyn Glennie – drums, gongs, cymbals, metal objects, vibraphone, steel drum, marimba, simtak, toy piano, bell-tree, paper, voice

Source: Discogs

=== Production ===
- Recorded on 14–16 July 2003 by Jörg T. Schnabel at the ZuckerFabrik, Dormagen, Germany
- Additional recordings recorded and mixed by Myles Boisen in October 2006 at Guerrilla HiFI, Oakland, California, United States
- Produced by Fred Frith
- Mastered by Scott Hull

Source: Discogs
