= Margaret Maden =

British educationalist (born 1940)

Professor Margaret Maden (born 16 April 1940) is a British educationalist who was Headteacher of Islington Green School in Inner London from 1975 to 1983. She is said to have led the school from being "on the brink of closure" to becoming over-subscribed. During her tenure, members of the school's choir sang, initially unbeknownst to her, on Pink Floyd's number one hit "Another Brick in the Wall, Part 2".

== Career ==
Maden first taught geography in Stockwell Manor School, Brixton in 1962, then lectured at Sidney Webb College of Education. She was active in the National Union of Teachers and Chairman of the London Young Teachers Association in 1970. After four years as Deputy Head at Bicester School, Oxford, she was appointed to Islington Green School, followed by the Directorship of a new Islington 6th Form Centre from 1983 to 1986. She then spent a year as Principal Officer (Tertiary Planning) in the Inner London Education Authority before moving to local authority work at Warwickshire County Council, first as Deputy (1987), then Director of Education (1989). After early retirement, she took up a part-time post as the Director of the Centre for Successful Schools and chair in Education, Keele University, 1995–2003.

Maden was a member of the National Commission for Education 1999–2002, an OECD Scrutineer/Adviser, deputy chair at The Basic Skills Agency and most recently, a governor of Peers School (now The Oxford Academy), Oxford. In 2002 she became a Trustee/Director at the Royal Opera House until 2011, and in 2007 a governor of the Royal Ballet School, London. Maden is an Honorary Norham Fellow at Oxford University Department of Education.

== Publications ==
- Margaret Maden (1971) "The Teaching Profession and the Training of Teachers" Dear Lord James: A Critique of Teacher Education Tyrrell Burgess (ed.) Penguin
- Margaret Maden (1971) "Young Teachers: Change or Absorption" Teachers for Tomorrow. Calthrop.K and Owens.G (ed.)
- Margaret Maden (1993) "Dissolution in all but name" Education Answers Back. Chitty.C. & Simon.B (ed.) Lawrence & Wishart
- Margaret Maden (1994) "The Enabling LEA: a Warwickshire case study" School Co-operation: New Forms of Local Governance Ransom.S.& Tomlinson.J.(ed.) Longman
- Margaret Maden & Josh Hillman. (ed.) (1995) Success Against the Odds. National Commission on Education. Case studies of successful schools in disadvantaged settings .Routledge
- Margaret Maden (1996) Arts and Education: Leading Practice, A Report of an International Seminar, Bellagio, Italy . OECD
- Margaret Maden (1997) "Curriculum Planning; some OECD lessons" Living Education, Mortimore and Little(ed.) Paul Chapman
- Margaret Maden (1998)"Educational Government and Governance" Developing Education: Fifteen Years On Hunter.P.(ed.) Paul Chapman
- Margaret Maden (1998) School Improvement:The Role of LEA Inspectors and Advisers, Audit Commission.
- Margaret Maden (1999), "Education Reform and Children" The State and Children Tunstill, J,(ed) Cassell
- Maurice Kogan and Margaret Maden (1999) The Impact of OfSTED on Schools, Joseph Rowntree Charitable Foundation
- Margaret Maden. Ed. (1999) Independent Review of East Sussex LEA, East Sussex C.C.
- Margaret Maden and Jean Rudduck (1999) Improving Learning: The Pupils' Agenda. The Nuffield Foundation
- Margaret Maden (2000) Shifting Gear – Changing Patterns of Educational Governance in Europe, Trentham Books
- Margaret Maden, ed. (2001) Success Against the Odds – Five Years On, Falmer-Routledge
- Margaret Maden (2005)" A Better Deal for 14–19 year olds"and "A Learner's Charter". Letters to the Prime Minister, Ted Wragg (ed.) New Vision Group
