= Evelyn Glennie =

Scottish percussionist (born 1965)

Dame Evelyn Glennie CH DBE
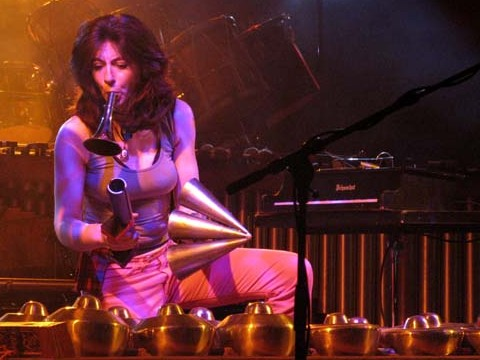
- Glennie at the 2004 Moers Festival

Background information
- Born: Evelyn Elizabeth Ann Glennie; 19 July 1965 (age 61); Methlick, Aberdeenshire, Scotland
- Occupation: Musician
- Instrument: Percussion
- Spouse: Greg Malcangi (m. 1994–2003)
- Website: evelyn.co.uk
- Awards: Polar Music Prize (2015); Léonie Sonning Music Prize (2023)

Dame Evelyn Elizabeth Ann Glennie, CH, DBE (born 19 July 1965) is a Scottish percussionist. She was selected as one of the two laureates for the Polar Music Prize of 2015.

== Early life ==
Glennie was born in Methlick, Aberdeenshire, in Scotland. The indigenous musical traditions of northeast Scotland were important in her development as a musician. Her first instruments were the piano and the clarinet. Other influences were Glenn Gould, Jacqueline du Pré and Trilok Gurtu. She studied at Ellon Academy, Aberdeenshire, and the Royal Academy of Music, London.

She was a member of the National Youth Orchestra of Scotland and the Cults Percussion Ensemble which was formed in 1976 by her school percussion peripatetic teacher Ron Forbes. They toured and recorded one album, which was re-released on Trunk Records in 2012.

== Career ==
Glennie tours all over the world performing as a soloist with a wide variety of orchestras and electric musicians. She conducts master classes, consultations and engages in motivational speaking. She is a leading commissioner of new works for solo percussion.

Glennie also plays the Great Highland Bagpipes and has her own registered tartan known as "The Rhythms of Evelyn Glennie".

Glennie performed at the Opening Ceremony of the Olympic Games in London 2012, leading a thousand drummers in the opening piece of music And I Will Kiss, and also playing the Glennie Concert Aluphone in Caliban's Dream during the ceremony for lighting the Olympic cauldron.

Glennie is a patron of the music charity Sound World.

On 7 April 2021, Glennie was named as Chancellor of Robert Gordon University, succeeding Sir Ian Wood in July 2021.

== Deafness ==
Glennie has been profoundly deaf since childhood, having started to lose her hearing at the age of 8. This does not inhibit her ability to perform. She regularly plays barefoot during live performances and studio recordings to feel the music.

Glennie contends that deafness is largely misunderstood by the public. She explains that her teacher Ron Forbes taught her to hear with parts of her body other than her ears. She felt the upper drum from the waist up and the lower drum from waist down. On her website Glennie published "Hearing Essay" in which she discusses her condition. Glennie also discusses how she feels music in different parts of her body in her TED talk "How To Truly Listen", published in 2003, and a collection of her speeches and writings are published in her book Listen World!.

Evelyn launched the Evelyn Glennie Podcast in 2022, in which she invites popular personalities from the world of music, sport, television and academia to discuss their idea of listening and interpretation of sound.

== Collaborations ==
Glennie was featured on Icelandic singer Björk's album Telegram, performing the duet "My Spine". She also co-composed "Oxygen". She has collaborated with many other musicians including former Genesis guitarist Steve Hackett, Bela Fleck, Bobby McFerrin, Fred Frith, Mark Knopfler, The King's Singers and Kodō.

In 2012, she collaborated with Underworld and Danny Boyle on the soundtrack to the Opening Ceremony of the London 2012 Olympic Games performing live in the stadium.

In 2018, Glennie worked with Gregory Doran and the Royal Shakespeare Company composing the music for a production of Troilus and Cressida. In the same year she began a collaboration with experimental jazz musicians Trio HLK, touring with them and appearing on their debut album Standard Time.

In 2020, Glennie collaborated with the music charity Sound World, composing a new piece "The Grace of Silence" for their Coronavirus Fund for Freelance Musicians. It was recorded by members of the Bristol Ensemble and released by Sound World in January 2021. It is the opening track on the album Reflections. Glennie also composed some of the music for the film Sound of Metal directed by Darius Marder. She is a prolific composer for the library music company Audio Network. Her works are published by Faber Music.

On 21 November 2007, the UK government announced an infusion of £332 million for music education. This resulted from successful lobbying spearheaded by Glennie, Sir James Galway, Julian Lloyd Webber, and the late Michael Kamen who (in 2002–03) together formed the Music in Education Consortium.

== Awards ==
Glennie's awards include:

- Royal Philharmonic Society's Best Soloist of the Year 1991
- Best Chamber Music Performance in the Grammy Awards of 1989
- Scot of the Year 1982
- Queen's Commendation prize for all round excellence, 1985
- Leonardo da Vinci International Art Award, 1987
- Scotswoman of the Decade, 1990
- Best Studio and Live Percussionist from Rhythm Magazine 1998, 2000, 2002, 2003 & 2004
- Walpole Medal of Excellence, 2002
- Fellowship of the Royal Academy of Music, 2002
- Honorary Doctorate from Heriot-Watt University, 2002
- Honorary Fellowship from Homerton College, Cambridge, 2016
- Musical America Instrumentalist of the Year, 2003
- Sabian Lifetime Achievement Award, 2006
- Percussive Arts Society: Hall of Fame – November 2008
- Polar Music Prize, 2015
- Best Classical Instrumental Solo in the Grammy Awards of 2014
- Léonie Sonning Music Prize, 2023

She has been awarded 29 honorary doctorates from universities in the United Kingdom, most recently in 2023, Doctor of Music (DMus) from the University of St Andrews, the Officer of the Most Excellent Order of the British Empire (OBE) in 1993 and was promoted to Dame Commander of the Most Excellent Order of the British Empire (DBE) in the 2007 New Year Honours. She was appointed to the Order of the Companions of Honour (CH) in the 2017 New Year Honours.

She owns in excess of 3,500 percussion instruments from all over the world and is continually adding to her collection. Glennie is an Ambassador of Sistema Scotland and is President of Help Musicians. She was appointed Music Rights Champion by the International Music Council in October 2016.

== Discography ==
- Bartók: Sonata for Two Pianos and Percussion / Brahms: Haydn Variations for Two Pianos (Sony Classical, 1988)
- Rhythm Song (RCA Victor, 1990)
- Light in Darkness (RCA Victor, 1991)
- Evelyn Glennie | Dancin (RCA Victor, 1991)
- Rebounds: Concertos for Percussion (RCA Victor, 1992)
- James Macmillan: Veni, Veni, Emmanuel (Catalyst, 1993)
- Last Night of the Proms: The 100th Season (Teldec 1994)
- Wind in the Bamboo Grove (Catalyst, 1995)
- Drumming (Catalyst, 1996)
- The Music of Joseph Schwantner (RCA Victor, 1997)
- Evelyn Glennie: Her Greatest Hits (RCA Victor, 1998)
- Street Songs (RCA Victor, Red Seal, 1998)
- Reflected in Brass: Evelyn Glennie Meets the Black Dyke Band (RCA Victor, Red Seal, 1998)
- Shadow Behind the Iron Sun (Catalyst, 2000)
- Dave Heath: Africa Sunrise/Manhattan Rave (Black Box, 2001)
- Béla Fleck: Perpetual Motion (Sony Classical, 2001)
- UFO: The Music of Michael Daugherty (Klavier, 2001)
- Mark-Anthony Turnage: Fractured Lines (Chandos, 2002)
- Oriental Landscapes (BIS, 2002)
- Christopher Rouse: Der gerettete Alberich / Rapture / Violin Concerto (Ondine, 2004)
- Michael Daugherty: Philadelphia Stories / UFO (Naxos, 2004)
- Philip Glass: The Concerto Project Vol. I (Orange Mountain Music, 2004)
- Margaret Brouwer: Aurolucent Circles / Mandala / Sizzle (Naxos, 2006)
- Touch the Sound (Normal, 2006) – soundtrack of the film of the same name
- Erkki-Sven Tüür: Magma (Virgin Classics, 2007)
- The Sugar Factory (Tzadik, 2007)
- Thea Musgrave: Turbulent Landscapes / Songs for a Winter's Evening / Two's Company (NMC, 2009)
- Experimental Percussion (Audio Network, 2009)
- Steven Stucky: Pinturas de Tamayo (BIS, 2010)
- Winter Wonderland (KPM Music, 2011)
- Ecstatic Drumbeat (BIS, 2012)
- Isles of Wonder (UMC, 2012)
- Cults Percussion Ensemble (Trunk, 2012)
- John Corigliano: Conjurer / Vocalise (Naxos, 2013)
- Altamira (Original Motion Picture Soundtrack) (Virgin EMI, 2016) – soundtrack of the film of the same name
- LOVE, POLITICS, WAR | Yolanda Brown (Black Grape Records, 2017)
- THE SHAMAN | ARCTIC SYMPHONY: Orchestral Music by Vincent Ho (Centrediscs, 2017)
- Mirage? Concertos for Percussion (MCO Records, 2017)
- The Core-tet Project: Improvisations by Evelyn Glennie, Jon Hemmersam, Szilárd Mezei and Michael Jefry Stevens (Naxos, 2018)
- Dreamachine – Michael Daugherty (Naxos, 2018)
- Standard Time – Trio HLK (Ubuntu, 2018)
- Out of the Silence – Orchestral Music by John McLeod (Delphian, 2018)
- RSC Troilus and Cressida: Music and Speeches CD (RSC Recordings, 2018)
- Double Crossings (Audionetwork, 2018)
- One Day Band 17 with Roly Porter (Trestle Records, 2019)
- Reflections: one track – The Grace of Silence – (Sound World, 2021)

== Films ==
- Touch the Sound (2004). Directed by Thomas Riedelsheimer, featuring a collaboration with Fred Frith. The farm where she grew up burned down during the production of the film, but her brother and the animals were unhurt.

== Autobiography ==
- Good Vibrations: My Autobiography
- Listen World!

== Children's book ==
- Listen: How Evelyn Glennie, a Deaf Girl, Changed Percussion

== Television appearances ==
- ZingZillas (2010). Appeared in episode 19 ("Hide and Seek") playing tubular bells on the BBC channel CBeebies. and in episode 50 ("Where's the Bug?") playing the waterphone.
- Sesame Street (2001). Appeared playing percussion with Oscar the Grouch's Grouchketeer Trash Band.

Performed a scene with Sesame Street regular Linda Bove.

- 2012 Summer Olympics opening ceremony (27 July 2012), leading a 1,000-drummer ensemble performing And I Will Kiss.
