= Urban Music Awards =

Music awards show

- Location: London, England, United Kingdom, Europe; France, Europe; New York City, United States of America; Africa; Asia
- Website: http://urbanmusicawards.net/

The Urban Music Awards (UMA) are a hip-hop, R&B, dance, and soul music awards ceremony that was launched in the UK by Jordan Kensington in 2003 and is now held in multiple countries.

The US version of the award ceremony, the Urban Music Awards USA, was launched on 7 July 2007 at Hammerstein Ballroom, hosted by Foxy Brown and Spragga Benz, with award winners including Adele, Danity Kane, Jay Z, Grandmaster Flash, Sean Paul, Beyoncé, Bobby V, Enrique Iglesias, Rihanna, Lupe Fiasco, Mary Mary, Amy Winehouse, Leona Lewis, and Chip.

== History ==
The Urban Music Awards were launched by Jordan Kensington in 2003 to recognize the achievement of urban-based artists, producers, clubs, DJs, radio stations, record labels, and artists from the current R&B, hip hop, neo soul, jazz, and dance music scene.

The winners are selected by an online public vote.

== Urban Music Awards USA 2009 ==
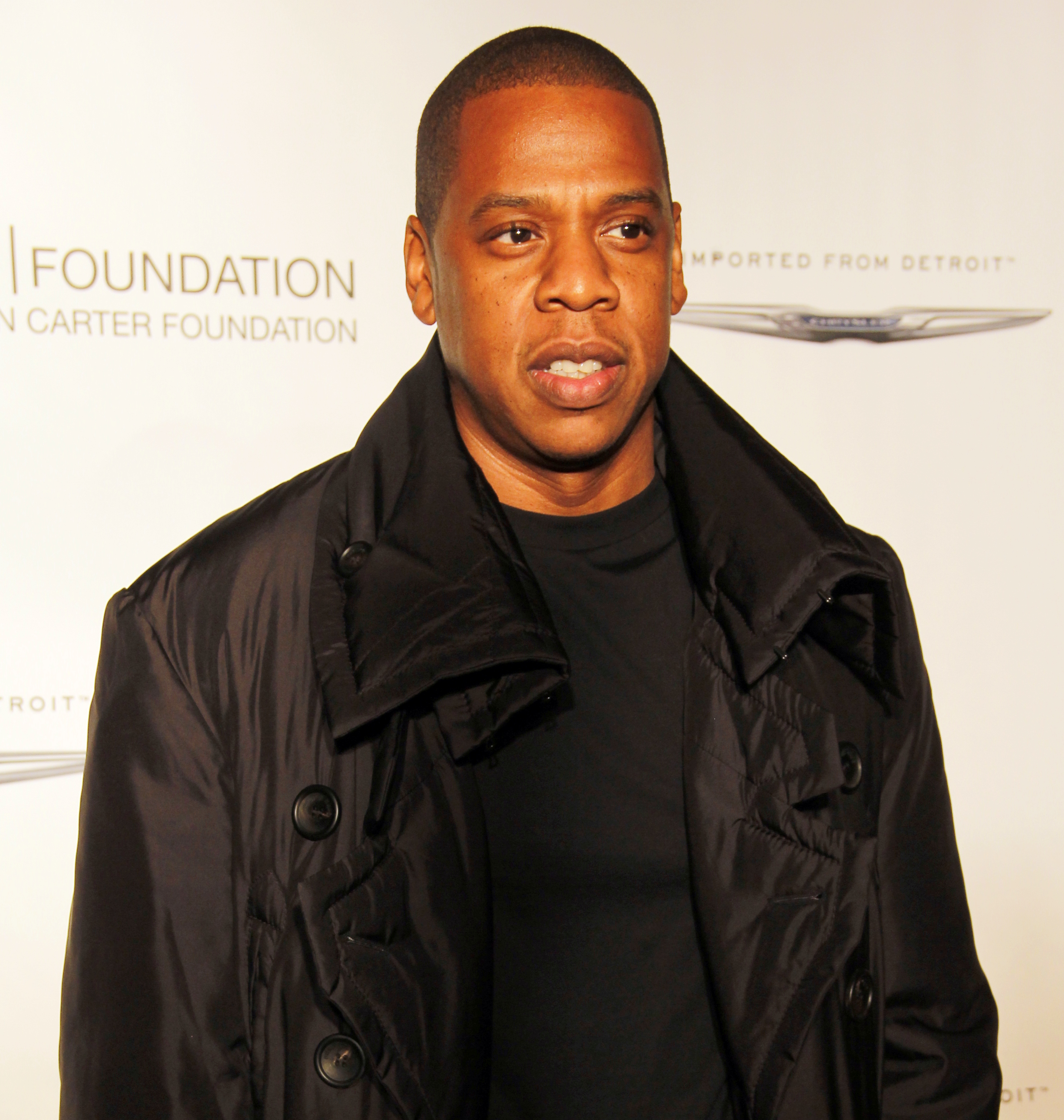
Jay-Z Winner of Urban Music Awards

The 2009 Urban Music Awards were held on 17 July 2009 at the Hammerstein Ballroom in New York City before returning to London on 1 November for the UK version of the show. The 2009 return was covered by the major international press, including OK! Magazine, the Daily Express, and the Insider. 2009 also saw the launch of the Best Asian Act category to celebrate artists and musicians of Asian origin, which was widely covered within the Asian media worldwide.

The winners of the Urban Music Awards USA 2009:
Categories	Winners
Artist of the Year	Akon
Best Album	Kanye West, 808’s & Heartbreak
Best Gospel Act	Kirk Franklin
Best International Latino Act	Enrique Iglesias
Best Music Video	Rihanna, "Rehab"
Best R&B Act	Bobby V
Best DJ 2009	Funkmaster Flex
Best Radio Station	Hot 97
Bet TV show	Harlem Heights
Best HipHop Act	Jay-Z
Best Magazine	HipHop Weekly
Best Male Act	Bobby V
Best Collaboration	Ron Browz ft. Jim Jones & Juelz Santana, "Pop Champagne"
Best Female Act	Rihanna
Best International Reggae Act	Mavado
Best Producer	Swizz Beatz
Best Single	Kid Cudi, "Day & Night"
UMA Living Legend Award	KRS-One
Lifetime Achievement Award	Grandmaster Flash

== 2003: 1st Year ==
The awards took place in Hammersmith Palais.

The winners of the inaugural Urban Music Awards:
Categories	Winners
Best Hard Dance Artist/Producer	Kevin Energy
Best Hard Dance DJ	Alex Somers
Best House Act/DJ	Carl Cox
Best Garage Act Sponsored by PureGarage.com	Heartless Crew
Best Drum & Bass Act/DJ	Uncut
Best Underground Producer	Sticky
Best Reggae Act X	
Best Breakthrough-Most Inspiring Act Sponsored by Invincible Magazine	Dizzee Rascal
Best Independent Record Label Sponsored by Invincible Magazine	Soul 2 Soul Recording
Best HipHop Act Sponsored by HipHop Connection	Blak Twang
Best Club/Radio DJ Sponsored by UKPCDJ.COM x	
Best Club Night Sponsored by RedBull	Smoove
Best Underground Breakthrough DJ Sponsored by Diffusion PR	Misstress Barbara
Best Nu-Soul Act Sponsored by Soul Trade	Terri Walker
Best Crossover Chart Act Sponsored by Mecca USA	Jaimeson
Best Radio Station	Flava FM
Best Underground DJ	DJ Jollie
Best Compilation	The Mixologists
Rock/Pop Artist Of The Year	John Taglieri
Best Unsigned Act Sponsored by Xtreme Talent	Transformerz

== 2004 ==
The awards took place at the Barbican.

The winners of the 2nd annual Urban Music Awards:
Categories	Winners
Best Hip Hop Act	Klashnekoff
Best Crossover Chart Act	Lemar
Best Nu-Soul Act	Rhian Benson
Best Album	TY, Upwards
Most Inspiring Act	Estelle
Best Garage Act	Wiley
Best Newcomer	Kano
Best UK Radio DJ	Ras Kwame
Best Jazz Act	Soweto Kinch
Best Club Night	The Jump Off
Best Underground Producer	Jon E Cash
Best Drum & Bass Act DJ	Dillinja & Lemon D
Best R&B Act	Gemma Fox
Best Gospel Act	Raymond&Co
Best Underground DJ	The Mixologist
Best Underground Radio Station	Bassline FM
Best Independent Record Label	jetstar
Best Compilation	Split Mics
Best Music Video	Lethal Bizzle
Best Hard Dance DJ	Hixxy
Best Hous DJ	Louie Vega
Best Street Dancer	Nexus Boys
Best Unsigned Act	Lee Henry
Outstanding Achievement Award	Beverley Knight

== 2005 ==
The venue was Wembley Arena.

The winners of the 3rd annual Urban Music Awards:
Categories	Winners
Best Website	www.promotioncity.co.uk
Best Entrepreneur	Marcus Miller
Best Magazine	Touch Magazine
Best UK Reggae Act/DJ	Maxi Priest
Best HipHop Act	Skinny Man, "I'll be surprised"
Best Crossover Chart Act	Raghav, "Angel Eyes"
Best Neo-Soul Act	Terri Walker
Best Album	Roll Deep, In At the Deep End
Most Inspiring Act in association with invinciblemag.com	Tubby T, "Ready She Ready"
Best Newcomer	Sway Dasafo, "Flo Fashion"
Best Garage Act	Lethal B, "Against All Odd’s"
Best UK Radio DJ	Ras Kwame
Best Jazz Act	Courtney Pine
Best Club Night	MTV Base Lounge
Bet Underground Producer	Dexplicit
Best Drum & Bass Act/DJ	Roni Size
Best R&B Act	Jamelia, "Thank you"
Best Gospel Act	Raymond & Co
Best Underground DJ	Smasherelly
Best Community Radio Station	Xtreme fm
Best Independent Label	BBE Recordings
Best Compilation	Union Black
Best Music Video	Fusion & guests "Greatest Show"

== 2006 ==
The awards took place in the Grand Connaught Rooms.

The winners of the 4th annual Urban Music Awards:
Categories	Winners
Best Neo Soul	Omar
Best Newcomer	Soundbwoy
Best Magazine	RWD
Best Hard Dane Act/DJ	Doc Savage
Best House DJ	Paul Jackson
Best TV Show	Chancers
Best Album	Lily Allen
Best UK Radio DJ	Semtex
Best R&B Act	Fun*Damental
Best UK Reggae Act	YT
Best Underground DJ	Daz
Best Independent Label	Relentless
Best Underground Producer	Baby J
Best Website	Ukmusic.com
Most Inspiring Act	Fun*Damental
Best Radio Station	Choice FM
Best Club Night	Get Down@ Bar Rumba
Best Crossover Chart Act	Supafly Inc
Best Jazz Act	Soweto Kinch
Best Drum & Bass DJ	DJ Hype
Best Entrepreneur	Uproar PR
Best Garage Act	Doctor
Best Gospel Act	Four Kornerz
Best HipHop Act	Akala
Best Music Video	Nathan, "Cold as Ice"
Outstanding Achievement Award 2006	Omar
Lifetime Achievement Award 2006	Jazzie B

== 2007 ==
The awards took place in the Grand Connaught Rooms.

The winners of the 5th annual Urban Music Awards:
Categories	Winners
Best Reggae Act	Sean Paul
Best Underground DJ	Cameo
Best Radio Station	Choice FM
Best Jazz Act	Courtney Pine
Best Club Night	Twice as Nice
Best Neo Soul Act	Nate James
Best Garage Act	N-Dubz
Best Drum & Bass DJ/Act	Shy FX
Best Gospel Act	Raymond & Co
Best Independent Record Label	Big Dadda Recordings
Best UK Radio DJ	DJ 279 (Choice FM)
Best Album	Lemar, Truth about Love
Best TV Show	Popworld (T4/Channel 4)
Best Newcomer	Mr. Midas
Best R&B Act	Nathan
Best HipHop Act	Wiley
Best Magazine	Young Voices
Most inspiring Act	Dizzee Rascal
Best Website	Myspace
Best Crossover Chart Act	Just Jack
Best Producer	Davinche
Best Music Video	Natalie Williams, "This Girl"
Best Entrepreneur	Tim Campbell (BBC1, The Apprentice)

== 2008 ==
The awards took place at O2 Arena.

The winners of the 6th annual Urban Music Awards:
Categories	Winners
Best Album	Leona Lewis, Spirit
Best Collaboration	Estelle ft. Kanye West, "American Boy"
Best Crossover Chart Act	Booty Luv
Best Dance Act	Wideboys
Best DJ	Mister Jam
Best Entrepreneur	Lethal Bizzle
Best Gospel Act	29th Chapter
Best Group	Roll Deep
Best HipHop Act	Sway
Best Independent Label	Boy Better Know
Best Jazz Act	Adele
Best Neo Soul Act	Amy Winehouse
Best Newcomer	Chipmunk
Best Magazine	Young Voices
Best Music Video	Tinchy Stryder ‘Stryderman’
Best Producer	Fraser T Smith
Best R&B	Leona Lewis
Best Radio Station	Choice FM
Best TV Show/Film	Nokia Green Room
Best UK Radio DJ	Rickie and Melvin
Best Website	Myspace.com/thehookup
Most Inspiring Act	Bashy
Lifetime Achievement Award	Mica Paris
Outstanding Achievement Award	DJ Luck & MC Neat
Lifetime Achievement Award	Finley Quaye

== 2009 ==
The awards took place at Wembley Arena.

The winners of the 7th annual Urban Music Awards:
Categories	Winners
Best Album	N-Dubz Uncle B
Best Dance Act (UK & France)	Calvin Harris
Best DJ (UK & France)	Swerve (Kiss)
Best Group (UK & France)	JLS
Best TV Station	Flava TV
Best Collaboration	Jay Sean ft. Lil Wayne, "Down"
Best Hip Hop Act	Sway
Best Music Video	K.I.G, "Head, Shoulders, Knees & Toes"
Best Radio Station	Kiss
Best UK Asian Act	R.D.B
Best Entrepreneur Category	Levi Roots
Best Newcomer	Egypt
Best R&B Act	Brick & Lace
Most Inspiring Act	Brick & Lace
Best Jazz Act	YolanDa Brown
Best Gospel Act	Guvna B
Best Producer	Blessed Beats
Best Radio Show	James Merritt

== 2010 ==
The awards took place at Grand Connaught.

The winners of the 8th annual Urban Music Awards:
Categories	Winners
Best Album	N-Dubz, Against all Odds
Best Collaboration	Tinie Tempah ft. Labyrinth, "Pass Out"
Best Dance Act (Europe)	Cascada
Best DJ	Shortee Blitz & DJ MK
Best Gospel Act	London Community Gospel
Best Group	JLS
Best European Act	Tal
Best International Act	Iyaz
Best Newcomer	Tinie Tempah
Best HipHop Act	Tinie Tempah
Best R&B Act	JLS
Best Music Video	Mclean, "My Name"
Best Street Dance Group	Diversity
Best Asian Act	Jay Sean
Best TV Station	4Music
Best Radio Station	Choice FM
Best Radio Show	DJ Swerve
Best Producer	David Guetta
Outstanding Achievement Award	Damage
Lifetime Achievement Award	Sade

== 2011 ==
The awards took place at Porchester.

The winners of the 9th annual Urban Music Awards:
Categories	Winners
Best Collaboration	Chipmunk ft. Chris Brown, "Champion"
Best Male Artist	Ed Sheeran
Best Female Artist	Jessie J (Island/Lava)
International Artist of the Year	Chris Brown
Best Album	Beverley Knight, Soul UK
Best HipHop	Wretch 32
Best Single	Wretch 32 ft Example, "Unorthodox"
Best Music Video	Wretch 32 ft Example, "Unorthodox"
Artist of the Year	Wretch 32
Best Newcomer	Emeli Sandé
Best DJ	Nikki
Best Dance Act	DJ Fresh ft Sian Evans, "Louder"
Best Radio Station	Kiss
Best Radio Show	Twin B (1Xtra)
Best Producer	Benny Benassi
Best R&B Act	Emeli Sandé

== 2012 ==
The awards took place at Grand Connaught.

The winners of the 10th annual Urban Music Awards:
Categories	Winners
Best Newcomer	Sneakbo
Best Hip Hop Act	Sway
Best Female Act	Lady Leshurr
Best MusicVideo	Rudimental, "Feel the Love"
Best Grime Act	Big Narstie
Best Gospel Act	London Community Gospel Choir
Best Radio Show	Charlie Sloth
Best African/Afro beats	Fuse ODG
Best R&B Act	Lemar
Best Single	Azealia Banks ft. Lazy Jay, "212"
Artist of the year	Rita Ora
Best Male Artist	Maverick Sabre
Best Group	Clement Marfo & The Frontline
Best Collaboration	Devlin ft. Ed Sheeran, "Watchtower"
Best Producer	Pavilion
Best International Artist	Chris Brown
Best DJ	Shortee Blitz
Best Album	Rihanna, Talk that Talk
Best Reggae Act	Mavado
Best Electronic/ Dance Act	DJ Act
Lifetime Achievement Award	Norman Jay M.B.E

== 2013 ==
The awards took place at Grand Connaught.

The winners of the 11th annual Urban Music Awards:
Categories	Winners
Best International Act	Bruno Mars
Best Album	Naughty Boy, Hotel Cabana
Best Radio Station	Kiss FM
Best R&B Act	Mike Hough
Best Reggae Act	Sean Paul
Best Radio Show	Charlie Sloth
Best Newcomer	Jahmene Douglas
Best Single	Fuse ODG
Best Female Act	Laura Mvula
Best Mal Artist	Ghetts
Best Hiphop Act	Krept & Konan
Best Electronic Dance Act	Avicii
Best Group	Krept & Konan
Best African/ Afrobeats Act	Atumpan
Best Gospel Act	Guvna B
Best Music Video	Fuse ODG ft. Wyclef, "Antenna"
Best Grime Act	Big Narstie
Best Collaboration	Fuse ODG ft. Wyclef
Best DJ	Shortee Blitz
Best Producer	Diplo

== 2014 ==
Winners for the Urban Music Awards 2014 included:

The winners of the 12th annual Urban Music Awards:
Categories	Winners
Best Female Act	Neon Jungle
Best Group	Neon Jungle
Best Newcomer	Stephanie McCourt
Best Single	Nico & Vinz — "Am I Wrong"
Best Crossover Pop Act	Nico & Vinz
Best Male Artist	Ghetts
Best R&B/Soul Act	Debra Debs
Best Hip Hop Act	Giggs
Best Radio Show	Kojo & Jade (Capital Xtra in the Morning)
Best Collaboration	Brookes Brothers ft. Chrom 3 — "Carry Me On"
Best Grime Act	Big Narstie
Best Producer	Splurge Boys
Best International Artist	Pharrell Williams
Best DJ	Shortee Blitz
Best Album	Ghetts — Rebel with a Cause
Best African/Afro Beats Act	Mista Silva
Best Gospel Act:	ACM Gospel Choir
Best Reggae Act	Stylo G
Best Electronic/ Dance Act	Clean Bandit
Best Music Video	Nico & Vinz — "Am I Wrong"
Best Music Channel	Channel AKA
Best Clothing Brand	Money Clothing
Best Music PR Company	Impressive PR
Best Radio Station	Kiss

== 2015 ==
In 2015 the UMA events returned in London. Over 770,000 votes were received online. The show was hosted by founder, Jordan Kensington and singer/songwriter, Kiera Weathers. The awards included performances from Big Narstie, Kid Army, Kym Mazell, Rough Copy, Kelvin Jones, Chos3n and Young Kings. The UMA official house band, the Dominos provided the backdrop to music performed on stage by Macklemore and a collaboration of "Ready or Not" by Fugees featuring the hosts. Lady Leshurr won record three awards for UMA Best Music Video 2015, Best Female Act 2015, and Best HipHop Act 2015.

The winners of the 13th annual Urban Music Awards:
Categories	Winners
Best Female Act	Lady Leshurr
Best Male Act	Stormzy
Best Newcomer	Kelvin Jones
Best International Artist	Drake
Best Grime Act	Big Narstie
Best R&B / Soul Act	Shakka
Best Hip-Hop Act	Lady Leshurr
Best African Act	Moe Logo
Best Reggae Act	Stylo G
Best Jazz Act	Zara McFarlane
Best Gospel Act	Chos3n
Best Group	Rudimental
Best Producer	Diztortion
Best DJ	Shortee Blitz
Best Single	WSTRN — "In2"
Best Collaboration	Shakka feat. JME — "Say Nada"
Best Music Video	Lady Leshurr — "Queen Speech 4"
Best Radio Station	Colourful Radio
Best Radio Show	Neev "Kisstory" (Kiss)
Best Music Channel	Channel AKA
Best Clothing Brand	Dench
Best Music PR Company	Ditto Music

== 2016 ==
The winners of the 14th annual Urban Music Awards:
Categories	Winners
Best Album	Giggs — Landlord
Best Pop Act (sponsored by VooVix)	Craig David
Best International Act	Drake
Best Producer	Jonas Blue
Best DJ (sponsored by Phonaudio)	Kenny Allstar
Best Radio Show (sponsored by Phonaudio)	Not for the Radio
Best Grime Act	Big Narstie
Best Gospel Act	Muyiwa & Riversongz ‘Eko Ile’
Best Single	Abra Cadabra feat. Krept & Konan — "Robbery" remix
Best Male Act	Craig David
Best Newcomer	Izzie Gibbz
Best Hip-Hop Act	Giggs
Best Reggae Act	Protoje
Best Jazz Act	Empirical
Best African Act (sponsored by Mokingo)	Mista Silva
Best R&B Act (sponsored by VooVix)	Angel
Best Female Act	Laura Mvula
Best Group	Section Boyz
Best Record Label	All Around the World
Best TV Channel (sponsored by Zagatti Gourmet Experience and The Forklab)	Channel AKA
Best Radio Station	The Beat London 103.6FM
Best PR Company	Ditto Music
UMA Living Legend (sponsored by Hpnotiq)	Brand New Heavies
Outstanding Contribution to Drum & Bass	Fabio & Grooverider
Outstanding Contribution to Urban Music	Dizzee Rascal

== 2017 ==
The winners of the 15th annual Urban Music Awards:
Categories	Winners
Best Newcomer (sponsored by WGA$ Official)	Not3s
Artist of the Year (France)	MHD
Artist of the Year (Africa)	Jupitar
Artist of the Year (USA)	Chris Brown
Artist of the Year (Asia)	Mumzy Stranger
Artist of the Year (South America)	C-Kan
Best Music Video (sponsored by Hawkes & Brimble)	Lady Leshurr — ‘Juice’
Artist of the Year (Caribbean)	Damien Marley
Artist of the Year (UK) (sponsored by Hawkes & Brimble)	Ed Sheeran
Best Album	Wretch 32 — Growing Over Life
Best Pop Act (sponsored by VooVix)	Zayn
Best Entertainer (sponsored by Bank Republic PR)	Mo (The Comedian)
Best International Act	DJ Khaled
Best Producer (sponsored by Dechavel Watches)	The Fanatix
Best DJ (sponsored by Sant Ana)	Tiffany Calver
Best Radio Show	Ras Kwame (Capital Xtra)
Best Grime Act	Stormzy
Best Gospel Act	Hope Dealers
Best Single	Sneakbo Feat. Giggs — ‘Active’
Best HipHop Act	Fekky (UK)
Best Male Act	Kojo Funds
Best Jazz Act	Ezra Collective
Best R&B Act (sponsored by VooVix)	Angel
Best Female Act	Lady Leshurr
Best Group	Krept & Konan
Best Record Label	Disturbing London
Best Radio Station	Capital Xtra
Lifetime Achievement Awards	Omar

== 2018 ==
The winners of the 16th annual Urban Music Awards:
Categories	Winners
Best Newcomer	Big Zuu
Best International Artist	Drake
Best Group	Lotto Boyz
African Artist of the Year	Davido (Nigeria)
Artist of the Year (USA)	Chris Brown
Best Music Video	EO – ‘German’
Best Producer	Da Beatfreakz
Best Hip Hop Act	Dave (UK)
Artist of the Year (UK)	Yxng Bane
Best Album	Big Narstie – BDL Bipolar
Best Radio Show	Julie Adenuga (Beats 1)
Best DJ	Shortee Blitz
Best Radio Station	BBC 1Xtra
Best Single	Cadet & Deno Driz ‘Advice’
Artist of the Year (France)	MHD
Artist of the Year (Asia)	Raxstar
Artist of the Year (South America)	J. Balvin (Colombia)
Artist of the Year (Caribbean)	Damian Marley
Best Entertainer	Michael Dapaah
Best Gospel Act	IDMC
Best Jazz Act	Roy Ayers
Best R&B Act	Khalid
Best Female Act	MØ
Best Record Label	Merky Records
Lifetime Achievement Award	Shy FX

== 2020 ==
The winners of the 17th annual Urban Music Awards:
Categories	Winners
Best Single (sponsored by Santa Ana)	AJ Tracey — "Ladbroke Grove"
Best Newcomer	Hamzaa
Best Female Act	Kara Marni
Artist of the Year (UK) (sponsored by Dechavel)	AJ Tracey
Best Grime Act	Ghetts
Best Album	AJ Tracey AJ Tracey
Best Male Act (sponsored by Tribe All)	AJ Tracey
Best Radio Show	Shortee Blitz & DJ MK ( Kiss 100)
Best Producer	Da Beatfreakz
Best Entertainer	Spuddz
Artist of the Year (Africa) (sponsored by Godgiven Talent)	Burna Boy (Nigeria)
Best Hip hop Act	Versatile
Best Podcast	The Receipts Podcast
Best DJ	DJ G-A-Z
Best Singer/Songwriter	Taliwhoah
Best Record Label	Merky Records
Best Jazz Act	Ezra Collective
Best Gospel Act	Guvna B
Artist of the Year (Caribbean)	Sean Paul (Jamaica)
Artist of the Year (France)	Aya Nakamura
Artist of the Year (Asia)	Arjun
Artist of the Year (South America)	Bad Bunny
Best Radio Station	BBC 1Xtra
Best Group	Kokoroko
Artist of the Year (USA)	Chris Brown
Best Music Video	Mabel — "Don't Call me Up"
Best Nightclub	O Beach Club (Ibiza)
Best Artist Manager	Andy Varley
Best Music Festival	Wireless Festival
Best Publicist	Louise Mayne (We care a Lot PR)
Best Booking Agent	Obi Asika (Echo Talent)
Best Online Music Platform	Spotify

== 2022 ==
The winners of the 18th annual Urban Music Awards:
Categories	Winners
Best Producer	Steel Banglez
Best Collaboration	Beyoncé feat. Shatta Wale & Major Lazer — "Already"
Artist of the Year (UK)	Ghetts
Best Grime Act	D Double E — "Double of Northing"
Best Male Act	Dave
Artist of the Year (USA)	Drake
Most Creative Artist	Soulja Boy
Best Album	Ghetts — Conflict of Interest
Artist of the Year (Africa)	Wizkid (Nigeria)
Best HipHop Act	Nas — "King's Disease"
Best R&B Act	Rebecca Garton — "Take me Home"
Best Female Act	Jaz Karis
Best Music Video	Avelino ft. Not3s & Young — "Control"
Best DJ	Kenny Allstar
Best Record Label	BMG
Artist of the Year (Caribbean)	Sean Paul
Best Jazz Act	Esperanza Spalding
Best Radio Station	BBC 1Xtra
Artist of the Year (France)	Tay C
Artist of the Year (South America)	Daddy Yankee
Best Radio Show	The Marcus Nasty Show
Best Entertainer	Stevo the Madman
Artist of the Year (Asia)	Rika
Best Podcast	Who We Be Talks
Best Group	D Block Europe
Best Single	Olakira — "Maserati"
Best Newcomer	Backroad Gee
Best Singer/Songwriter	Kevin Davy White — "With You"
Best Gospel Act	Lurine Cato
Best Online Music Platform	TikTok
