= City of London Academy Islington =

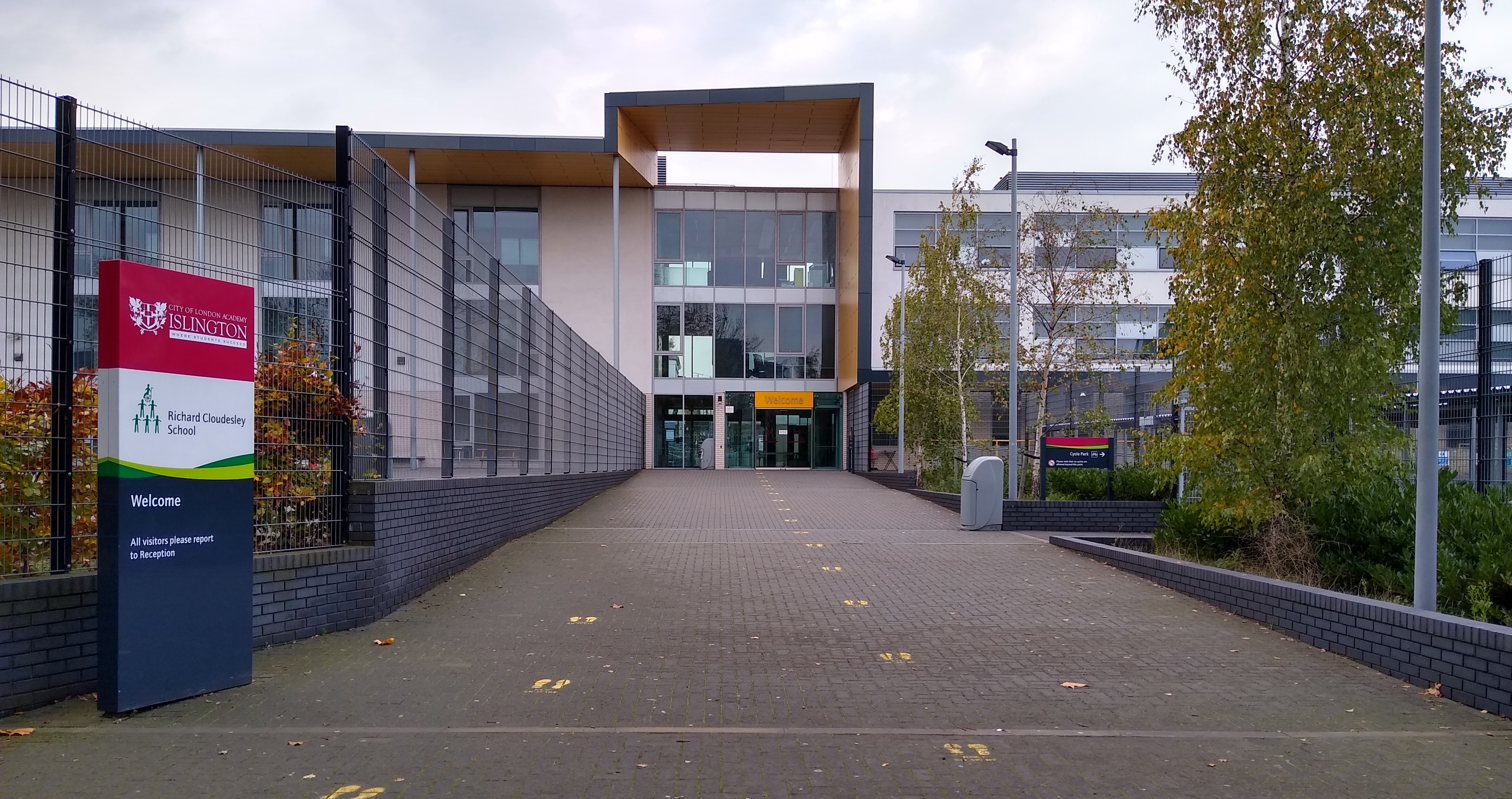

Location
- Prebend Street; Islington, Greater London, N1 8PQ; England; 51.5362°N 0.0979°W

Information
- Other name: COLAI
- Former name: Islington Green School
- Type: Academy
- Motto: Where students succeed
- Established: 1966
- Local authority: Islington London Borough Council
- Trust: City of London Academies Trust
- Department for Education URN: 135587 Tables
- Ofsted: Reports
- Principal: Laurie Glees
- Gender: Mixed
- Age range: 11–18
- Enrolment: 750 (2018)
- Capacity: 805
- Website: www.colai.org.uk

City of London Academy Islington (COLAI, formerly Islington Green School) is an 11–18 mixed, secondary school and sixth form with academy status in Islington, Greater London, England. It was established in 1966 and adopted its present name after becoming an academy in September 2008.

Its sixth form opened in September 2010 and is jointly sponsored by the City of London Corporation and City, University of London.

== History ==
=== Islington Green School ===
Logo of Islington Green School

Islington Green School (IGS) was established in 1966 and was an 11–16 mixed community secondary school.

In 1997, the new Labour government, under Tony Blair, had made education reform a priority. The 1997 Education Act strengthened Ofsted's school inspection powers. Blair, an Islington resident, had not sent his children to Islington Green.

The school failed its Ofsted inspection in 1997. The school had received a 38 per cent pass rate the previous year and despite shortcomings, the staff were convinced that the school was not failing. The decision caused the school to "implode". The headteacher, under enormous pressure to make visible changes discarded mixed-ability teaching, many teachers decided to leave, and the pass rate dropped below 25 per cent. The school went through nine inspections before it finally came out of special measures in 2000 and serious weaknesses in 2003.

Ken Muller, a teacher at the school and SWP activist, made a request to Ofsted under the new Freedom of Information Act to see the documents relating to the judgment. Twenty working days later, he got a reply. Most of the documents had been destroyed, said the email, but there was one that might be of interest. Attached was a memo dated November 1997, from HMI Barry Jones to the then chief inspector Chris Woodhead, making clear that the HMI team, of which Jones was a member, had disagreed with Ofsted's judgment, and noting that they were "of the unanimous view that the school was not failing".

Peter Hyman, former speech writer for Tony Blair, decided to leave politics and teach at Islington Green School. He wrote a book of his experiences, 1 Out Of 10: From Downing Street Vision To Classroom Reality.

In 2006, consultation was launched on plans to close Islington Green school and convert it to an Academy run by the City of London Corporation and City University. The plans were implemented in 2008.

== Cultural references ==
Students from the school were featured on Pink Floyd's 1979 album The Wall and the UK-chart-topping single from it, "Another Brick in the Wall (Part II)".

The school was used as a location to film the BBC drama That Summer Day, a fictional account of the effect the bombings of the London public transport system on 7 July 2005 had on six children. Some of the school's younger students were used as extras in the film.

== Notable alumni ==
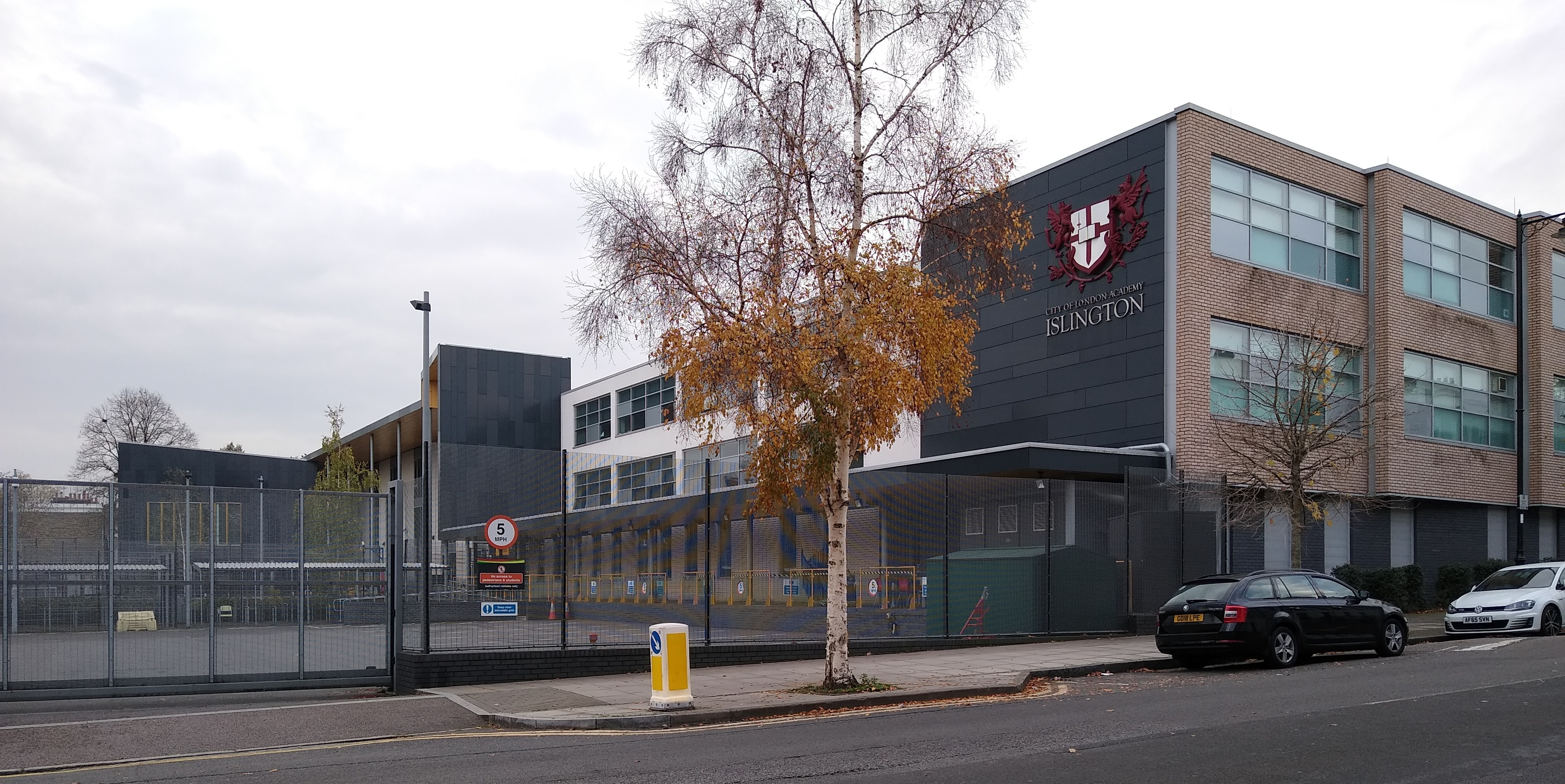
City of London Academy Islington

Islington Green School

- Thomas Cruise, professional footballer
- Esther Farinde, singer and songwriter
- Paloma Faith, singer, songwriter and actress
- Billy Godleman, cricketer
- Joe Wright, film director

== Notable staff ==
Islington Green School

- Margaret Maden, headteacher from 1975 to 1983
