= YolanDa Brown =

British saxophonist, composer, and broadcaster (born 1982)

YolanDa Brown OBE DL
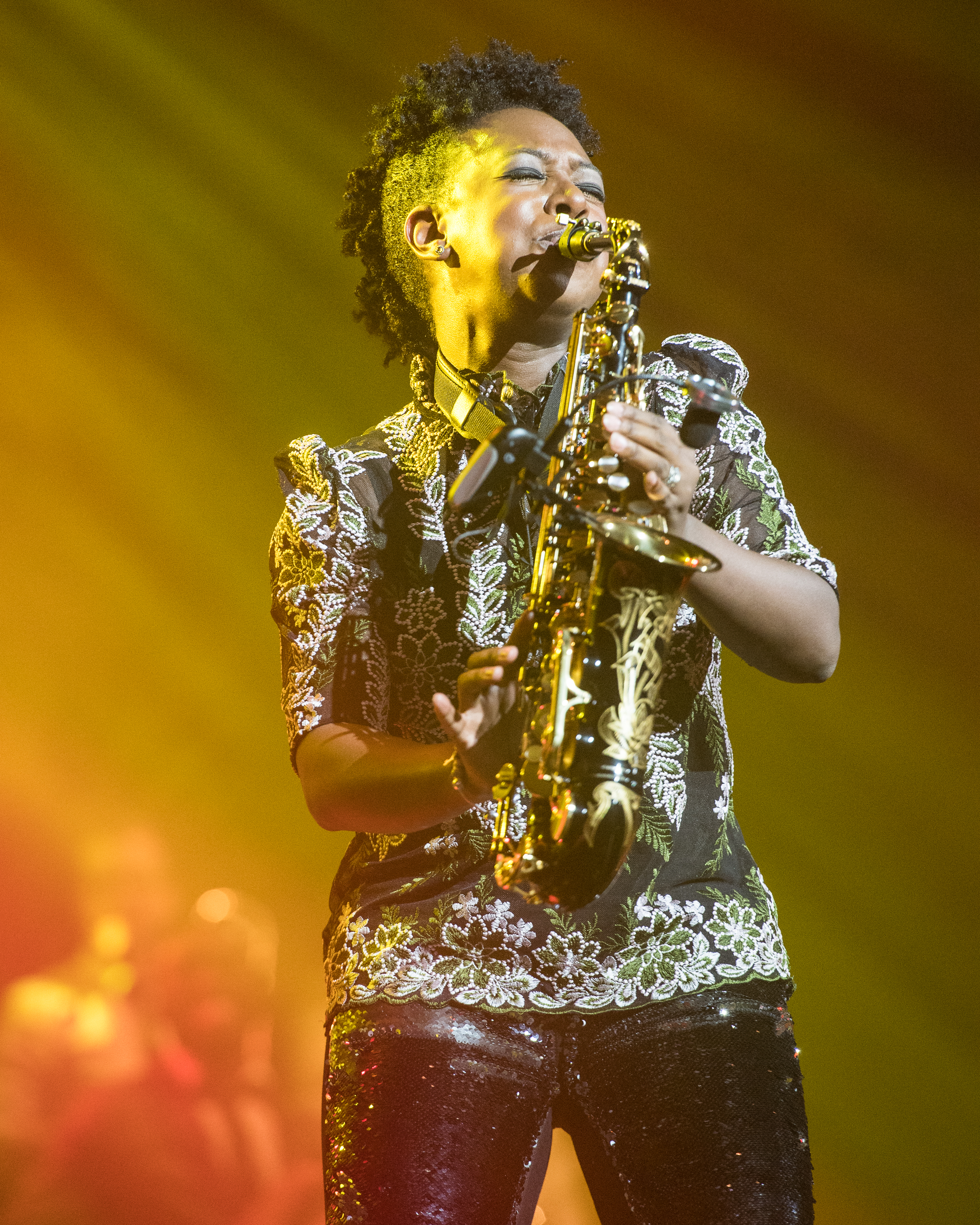
- YolanDa Brown performing at the Barbican Centre in 2016

Background information
- Born: YolanDa Faye Brown; 4 October 1982 (age 44); Barking, London, England
- Genres: Jazz; reggae; soul; gospel
- Instruments: Tenor, soprano and alto saxophone, EWI
- Years active: 2007–present
- Website: yolandabrown.co.uk

YolanDa Faye Brown OBE DL (born 4 October 1982) is a British saxophonist, composer, and broadcaster. Her musical sound is a fusion of reggae, jazz and soul. In 2022, she was appointed chair of the British Phonographic Industry (BPI).

== Early life and education ==
Brown was born to Jamaican parents (her mother was a headteacher, while her father was an advertising executive) in Barking, Essex, England. She grew up in Gants Hill in the London Borough of Redbridge. Her childhood dream was to become a racing car driver.

Brown was a student at Bancroft's School and Beal High School, where she became Head Girl. Brown went on to study at the University of Kent, Kent Business School in Canterbury. She also spent a year as an Erasmus student at the University of Oviedo in Asturias, Spain.

Her master's dissertation was on "Combining SSM (Soft systems methodology) and DESM (Discrete event simulation)". She graduated with a first-class degree. Brown gained a further master's degree in Methods of Social Research, followed by four years of Ph.D. study in management science, before taking a hiatus from her thesis on "Multi Methodology" to pursue her music career.

== Career ==
In 2008, Brown was a MOBO "Best Jazz" and UMA winner. In 2009, Brown became the first musician to not only be nominated in the "Best Jazz" category of the MOBOs in consecutive years, but also the first to win it two years running.

In February 2012, Brown released her first album April Showers May Flowers. That year, she also kicked off a UK and overseas tour in support of the album with two concerts at the HMV Hammersmith Apollo accompanied by her full band and the Royal Philharmonic Concert Orchestra. Brown's second album entitled Love Politics War was released on 16 June 2017. The album features original compositions blending reggae, jazz and soul, labelled somewhat tongue-in-cheek as "Posh Reggae".

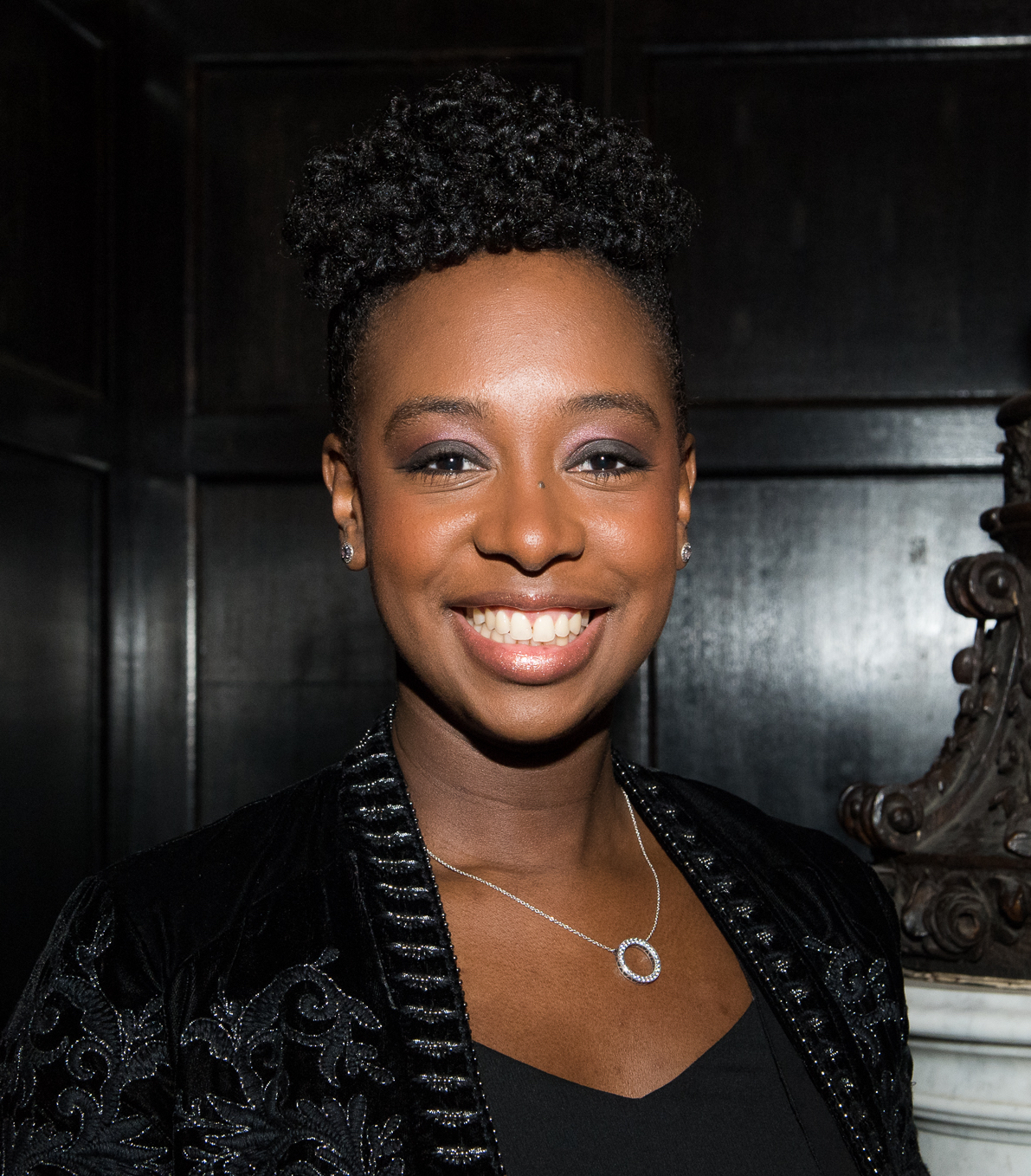
Brown in 2018

Brown's 20 episode BBC series, YolanDa's Band Jam began transmission on CBeebies on 26 January 2019. The show consists of Brown inviting star guests to play along with a live audience of children aged five to seven. Brown is a regular guest presenter on BBC Radio 4's programme Loose Ends with Clive Anderson She also presented a documentary on Williams Syndrome for the station.

The Department for Education and DCMS in 2021, invited Brown to sit on the advisory panel for the National Plan for Music Education (NPME), In June 2022, she was appointed by the Secretary of State Nadine Dorries, as National Council Member at Arts Council England. In July 2022, Brown was appointed chair of the British Phonographic Industry (BPI).

October 2022 saw Brown receive a BAFTA nomination in the Best Presenter category. In 2023, Brown made plans to open an Islington music venue and restaurant called Soul Mama, after raising funds on Kickstarter. The venue opened in 2024 and may be followed by a second location in 2026.

In April 2024, Brown was named as Chancellor of the University of Kent, a position previously held by Gavin Esler.

On the 1st of August 2026, University of Kent and University of Greenwich merged into the London & South East University Group (LASE), making Brown Chancellor of the group.

== Charity ==
In January 2018, Brown was appointed Chair of Youth Music, a national charity investing in music-making projects for children and young people experiencing challenging circumstances. Since 2017, Brown has been a BBC Music Ambassador. She is also a celebrity ambassador for The Prince's Trust, Children & the Arts, Plan UK, Place2Be, World Child Cancer and London Music Fund.

The YolanDa Brown Music Award in conjunction with the University of East London (UEL) provides financial support specifically to final-year students studying BSc (Hons) Music Technology or BA (Hons) Music Production and Culture at UEL. The award is available to up to four UEL students and provides them with funds toward studio time or music equipment. This was the first project from the YolanDa Brown Foundation.

In May 2018, Brown launched the London Saxophone Festival, an annual celebration of the saxophone through concerts, film, workshops and more. Featured artists included Bob Reynolds from Snarky Puppy and Casey Benjamin from the Robert Glasper Experiment. The second edition took place in June 2019 and the 2020 edition was postponed as a result of COVID-19.

In 2024, Brown became a member of the Blue Plaques panel.

== Honours and recognition ==
Brown was appointed Officer of the Order of the British Empire (OBE) in the 2023 New Year Honours for services to music, music education and broadcasting.

In October 2023, Brown was appointed Patron of the Cleft Lip and Palate Association (CLAPA), a UK charity supporting individuals and families affected by cleft conditions. In December 2023, she was awarded a Fellowship of the Royal Northern College of Music, recognising her achievements in music, broadcasting and advocacy for music education. In September 2025, Brown was named an Honorary Fellow of Rose Bruford College, acknowledging her contributions to the creative and cultural industries.

In January 2026, she became a Patron of the Newcastle United Foundation, supporting the charity’s work in community development, education and youth engagement. Later the same month, she was awarded the Freedom of the City of Newcastle upon Tyne, one of the city’s highest civic honours, in recognition of her contributions to the arts, education and community life.

On November 2026 she was appointed as the Royal Marine Band's first Honorary Colonel.

== Personal life ==
Brown lives in Chigwell with her husband, a music promoter and restaurateur, and their two daughters. She was one of eleven individuals appointed a Deputy Lieutenant of Greater London on 11 October 2022.

Brown was brought up with Christian values, and became a born-again Christian in her teenage years after attending a friend's youth convention.

== Discography ==
=== EPs and albums ===
- YolanDa Brown, Finding my voice (2007 CD - Black Grape Productions)
- A Step Closer (2008 EP release – Black Grape Productions)
- April Showers, May Flowers (February 2012 Album release – Black Grape Records)
- April Showers, May Flowers-Live Sessions (May 2013 Album release CD/DVD – Black Grape Records)
- Love Politics War (June 2017 Album release CD/digital/Vinyl – Black Grape Records)
- YolanDa’s Band Jam (January 2021 Album release Digital– Sony Music Magic Star)

== Awards and nominations ==
Year	Category	Award	Result	Ref
2008	WIEA Awards	Best Musician 2008	Won	
2008	Urban Music Awards	Best Jazz Act 2008	Nominated	
2008	MOBO Awards	Best Jazz Act 2008	Won	
2009	Marlborough Jazz Festival	Best Performer 2009	Won	
2009	Urban Music Awards	Best Jazz Act 2009	Won	
2009	Urban Music Awards	Most Inspiring Act 2009	Nominated	
2009	MOBO Awards	Best Jazz Act 2009	Won	
2018	Boisdale Music Award	Best Instrumentalist 2018	Won	
2018	Black Magic Awards	Inspiration Award 2018	Won	
2022	Music Week Women in Music Award	Music Champion 2022	Won	
2022	BAFTA Award	Best Presenter 2022	Nominated	

Academic offices
Preceded by Gavin Esler	Chancellor of the University of Kent; 2014 – 2024	Incumbent
