= Tara Brown (singer) =

- Born: Tara Shereen Brown; 11 October 1984 (age 41); Tooting, South London, England
- Genres: Acoustic gospel, urban contemporary gospel, worship, soul, gospel
- Occupation: Singer-songwriter
- Instruments: Vocals, guitar
- Years active: 2008–present
- Website: https://www.diverseeducationalservices.com/

Tara Brown (born 11 October 1984) is an English acoustic gospel, contemporary Christian singer-songwriter, whose recent popularity boost followed her performance in the 2012 edition of the Time2shine Gospel Talent Search in the UK.

== Early life and education ==
Tara Brown was born in Tooting, South London. The 6th of 7 children born to Jamaican parents, Brown was raised in a very musical family with Grandparents, Uncles and Aunts many of whom were musical instrumentalists. Brown recalls becoming truly engaged with music at age 7, began composing age 10 and co-wrote her first song at age 11. From that age Brown's keen interest in singing and performing took flight and led to her joining the church choir.

Brown graduated Royal Holloway, University of London with a 2:1 BA Honours degree in English and Drama. She went on to attend the London College of Contemporary Music where she completed a course in vocal training.

She worked at The Petchey Academy Secondary School in Hackney as a drama teacher.

== Career ==
=== Music ===
During the university years, alongside her involvement with the choir, Brown joined a band called Nexus Groove Unit. This covers/funk based unit saw her gigging in a lot of bars and music venues across London for a few years. At age 19 her Christian faith gained clarity and her style of music slowly began to reflect this transformation.

In 2008, Brown took part in "Immerse" Music in the Rockies in Nashville, Tennessee. This is an annual event put on by the Gospel Music Association and LifeWay Christian Resources, two Christian non-profit organizations who share a goal of mentoring, developing and equipping the next generation of Christian artists and songwriters. Brown's talent for performance has also been showcased at the Edinburgh Festival Fringe.

Brown's 2008 experience in the Christian-based musical training programme "Immerse" marked a catalytic point in her musical journey. She began to share the stage with artists such as Nicole C. Mullen. Whilst on tour as an actress in 2011 she was overheard singing and playing her guitar during some down time between rehearsals for a play in Edinburgh. On her return to London, Brown found that "news" of her singing abilities had created a buzz and attracted some media attention, with Premier Christian Radio Colourful Radio and UGN JAMZ 24/7 being particularly supportive. Around this time Brown independently released two vocal tracks – "You Said" and "21" – on iTunes which attracted good rotation across those radio stations and the urban gospel network in the UK as a whole.

The impact of Brown's appearance in the 2012 series of Time2Shine led directly to the recording of her debut album, Disappear Imperfect. The album will be released early September 2013, with a live performance launch at The Jazz Café, London.

=== Acting and production ===
Brown is trained in tap dance, musical theatre and acting. She began acting with the Young Vic youth theatre and went on to perform in the Talawa Theatre Company young people's theatre. Brown took the lead in NPV Arts adaptation of Cinderella, an all singing all dancing musical theatre piece called 'Cinderella Shoeshine' .

Brown went on to play a wholesome teenager 'Theresa' in a four-year touring show called Do You Know Where Your Daughter Is?. touring at Edinburgh Festival Fringe, Soho Theatre and many more stages across the UK. Brown also performed in 'Sketches' at Croydon Fairfield Halls and 'The Younger Brothers'. both written and produced by Angie Le Mar, working with actors; Aaron Fontaine, Mikel Ameen and Petra Letang. Brown was the first producer of Angie Le Mar's Straight to Audience Youth project, producing 'The Younger Brothers' in 2011 a spin-off from Angie Le Mar's sell out show 'The Brothers' at the Hackney Empire.

== Charity work and other endeavours ==
Brown has also involved herself in charity work hosting and performing at the Little Big Peace Festival in November 2011 and The Life Festival charity event in the White Lion in Streatham, South London in March 2012. Since 2019 she has dedicated a lot of her time to providing creative projects and training workshops that support Diversity Equity and Inclusion through her business Diverse Educational Services.
