= Black Grape Global =

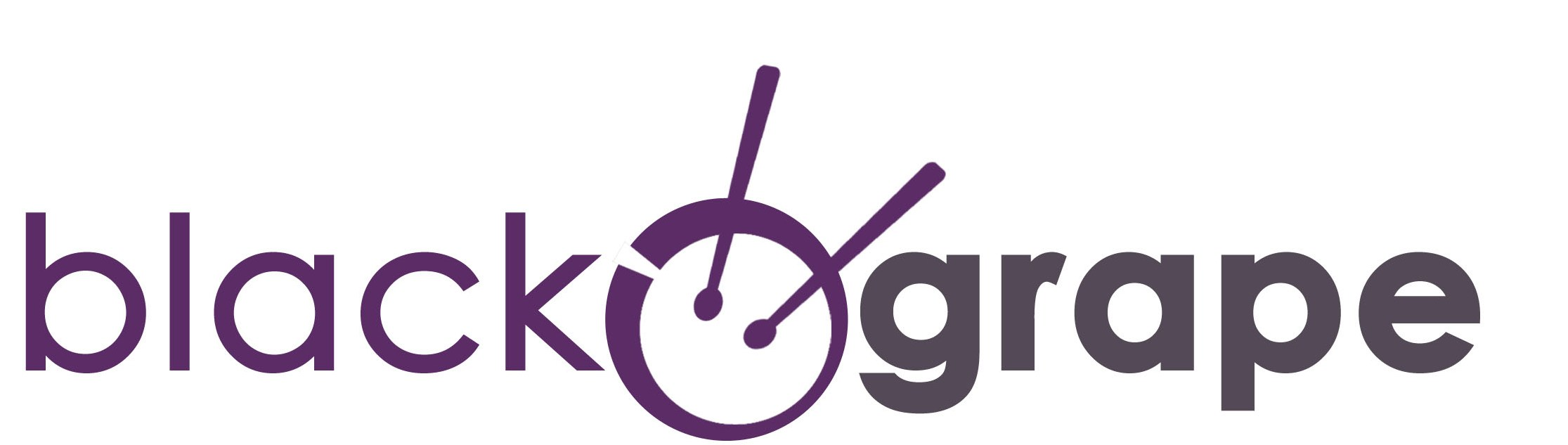
- Company type: Partnership
- Industry: Entertainment
- Founder: Adetokunbo "T" Oyelola
- Headquarters: London, England
- Key people: Adetokunbo "T" Oyelola
- Products: Entertainment

Black Grape Global is a London-based artist and entertainment management company. Black Grape's founder attended Kingston University and organised events there, and for other universities in the United Kingdom.

== Projects ==
- Managed Eddie Kadi, the first black UK comedian to perform at The O2 Arena, London, in September 2010.
- Managed YolanDa Brown, the British jazz saxophonist and composer. YolanDa became the first artist to win the MOBO Award for "Best Jazz Act" across two consecutive years. In 2012 she launched her debut album on the Black Grape Records label which peaked at Number 1 on both the UK iTunes and Amazon Jazz charts.
- Managed British urban contemporary gospel rapper and composer Guvna B. Black Grape delivered the staging of "An Evening with Guvna B" at the Hackney Empire. During his time with Black Grape Global, Guvna B was elected a Celebrity Ambassador for the Prince's Trust as well as a Youth For Christ Ambassador, won a MOBO award for Best Gospel Act in 2010, and moved into radio broadcasting in January 2012.
- Launched the Black Grape Music Venue and Gastro Bar, a joint venture between Adetokunbo T Oyelola, Eddie Kadi, Charlie Kenny and YolanDa Brown. The venue was officially unveiled to the public in the autumn of 2009 and featured African-Caribbean cuisine.
- Worked with Femi Temowo, Muyiwa & Riversongz, T3M, and Divine Divine amongst others.

== Black Grape Records ==
This record label was launched with the release of "April Showers May Flowers", an album by YolanDa Brown, in February 2012.

Black Grape Records
- Parent company: Black Grape Global
- Founded: January 2012
- Founder: Adetokunbo "T" Oyelola
- Distributor: Absolute/Universal (UK)
- Genre: Jazz, R&B, Urban, Gospel
- Country of origin: United Kingdom
- Official website: http://blackgraperecords.com/

=== Current projects ===
- YolanDa Brown (independent artist)
- Annastasia Baker (joint project with Time2Shine)
- Tara Brown (singer) (joint project with Time2Shine)

=== Previous artists ===
- Eddie Kadi (2002–2010, left)
- Guvna B (2009–2012, left)
