= Guvna B =

British rapper, author and broadcaster

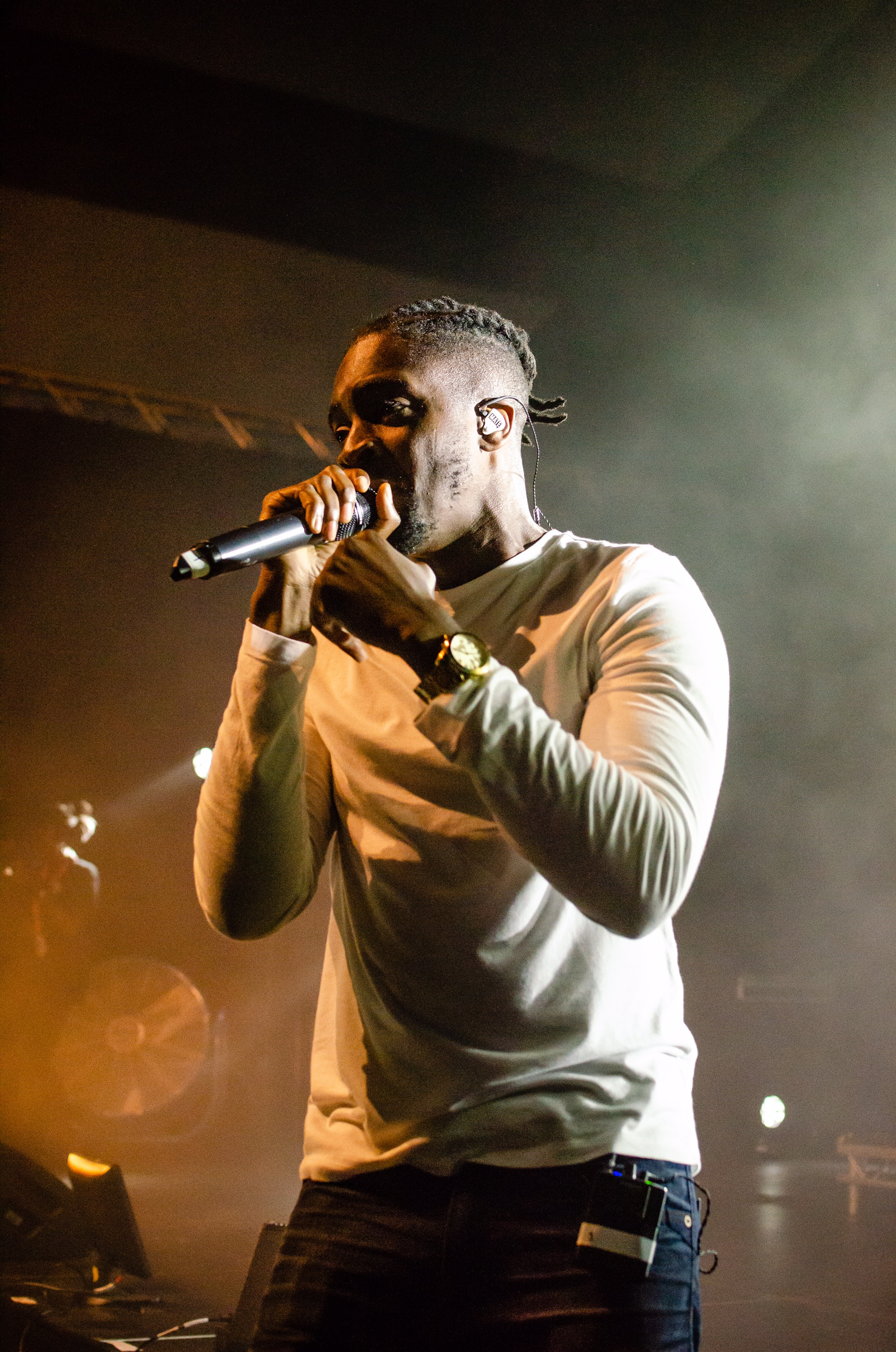
- Guvna B in 2019

Background information
- Also known as: Guvna B
- Born: Isaac Charles Bortey Borquaye; 13 June 1989 (age 37); Custom House, Newham, England
- Genres: Grime; British hip-hop; Christian hip-hop; gospel; CCM
- Occupations: Rapper, author, broadcaster
- Years active: 2007–present
- Website: www.guvnab.com

Isaac Charles Bortey Borquaye (born 13 June 1989), better known as Guvna B, is a rapper, author, and broadcaster from Custom House, London. He has released 10 albums, written two books, produced segments for the BBC, and served as a football pundit for Sky Sports News' Good Morning Transfers. He has also made appearances on television and in schools to discuss topics that affect young people from underprivileged communities.

== Early life ==
Guvna B was born in London, England in June 1989, to Ghanaian parents from Accra. He grew up in Canning Town, East London. Speaking on his upbringing, he has said: "My upbringing helped me find my faith. The negative things I saw in my society inspired me to do better and inspire people to be the best they can be instead of becoming stereotypical products of a negative environment". He first began making music at age 15. He later graduated from University of Hertfordshire studying Business and Journalism.

== Career ==
He has released ten albums and is the recipient of two MOBO Awards for Best Gospel Act, three Urban Music Awards for Best Gospel Act or Artist, and a Gospel Music Award for Best Gospel Artist. He was the first rapper to top the Official Christian and Gospel Charts for his 2013 album Odd1Out. His story was shared with many when he was featured in the 22 March 2013 issue of the music industry magazine Music Week in a feature covering the gospel music industry in the UK. He has worked with Wretch 32, Samm Henshaw, Matt Redman, Michelle Williams and Andy Mineo.

In January 2013, Guvna B launched his own urban clothing brand, Allo Mate.

Unpopular Culture was published in 2017 by the Society for Promoting Christian Knowledge, and Unspoken: Toxic Masculinity and How I Faced the Man Within the Man was published by Harper Inspire, an imprint of HarperCollins, in 2021 after his father's death from cancer.

He has presented documentaries on both radio and TV including BBC World Service's Gospel Meets Hip-Hop, and BBC Radio 2's Keeping the Peace. He has appeared as a pundit on Sky Sports News' Good Morning Transfers, and as a guest on The Zoe Ball Breakfast show on BBC Radio 2.

== Personal life ==
Guvna B was previously married to Emma Francis, with whom he has two children, a son and a daughter. They met in 2012 when they were setup by their friends, and married 3 years later. The marriage ended in June 2023, amid his struggle with pornography, which he has stated negatively affected his relationships and was a contributing factor to their divorce.

He is a fan of West Ham United F.C. His cousin is the actress and screenwriter Michaela Coel. Guvna B also appears in many videos of the Korean Englishman and JOLLY Youtube channel as a frequent guest.

== Works ==
=== Discography ===
- The Narrow Road (31 May 2008)
- Scrapbook (1 January 2011)
- Next Ting 140 (18 August 2011)
- Odd1Out (26 May 2013)
- Scrapbook II (31 March 2014)
- Something for the Summer (3 August 2014)
- Secret World (20 November 2015)
- Hands Are Made for Working (18 May 2018)
- Everywhere + nowhere (3 April 2020)
- The Village Is On Fire (26 May 2023)
- This Bed I Made (24 April 2026)

=== Bibliography ===
- Unpopular Culture. Society for Promoting Christian Knowledge. 2017. ISBN 978-0281076314.
- Unspoken: Toxic Masculinity and How I Faced the Man Within the Man. Harper Inspire. 2021. ISBN 9780310112471.

== Awards and nominations ==
Year	Category	Award	Result	Ref
2009	Gospel Music Awards	Best Gospel Artist 2009	Won	
2009	Urban Music Awards	Best Gospel Act 2009	Won	
2010	MOBO Awards	Best Gospel Act 2010	Won	
2012	RARE Rising Stars	UK's Top 10 Black Students 2012	Won	
2013	Urban Music Awards	Best Gospel Artist 2013	Won	
2013	MOBO Awards	Best Gospel Artist 2013	Nominated	
2013	Ghana UK-Based Achievement Awards	Music Artist of the Year 2013	Nominated	
2016	MOBO Awards	Best Gospel Artist 2016	Won	
2020	MOBO Awards	Best Gospel Artist 2020	Nominated	
2020	Urban Music Awards	Best Gospel Act 2020	Won	
2021	MOBO Awards	Best Gospel Act 2021	Won	
