= Angie Le Mar =

British comedian

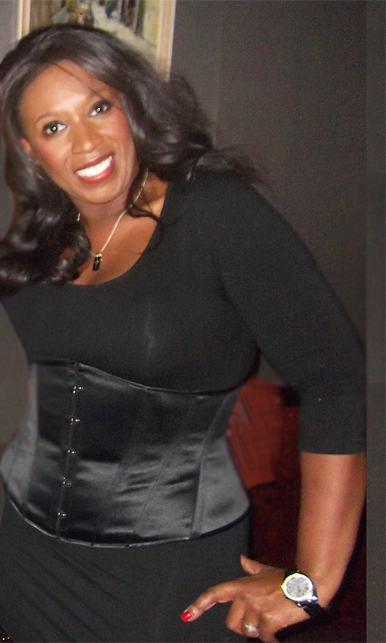
- Angie Le Mar at event in January 2011
- Born: 27 October 1965 (age 60); Lewisham, London, England
- Occupations: Actor, comedian, writer, director, presenter, producer
- Years active: 1985–present
- Website: http://www.angielemar.com/

Angie Le Mar (born 27 October 1965) is a British comedian, actor, writer, director, presenter and producer.

Le Mar is married with three children.

== Early life ==
Born in Lewisham, London, of Jamaican parentage, she grew up with four older brothers. She attended Lewisham Bridge School, Lewisham Girls School, Blackheath Bluecoat School and Vauxhall College. Her experience at school was difficult, and it was not until she completed her education that she was diagnosed as dyslexic. At the age of ten, Le Mar appeared in a school play called In on the Island at the Albany Empire and then attended the Lewisham Drama Club, inspired by her primary school teacher Mr Woodgate. She then Joined Second Wave Women's Drama group, where she performed Net Full of Holes, also at the Albany Empire.

== Career ==
Le Mar attended the Barbara Speake Stage School, and Afro Sax drama club run by Larrington Walker, Ellen Thomas and Treva Etienne. With two fellow actresses Le Mar set up her own theatre company, called the Bemarrow Sisters, which ran for seven years. Productions included A Slice of Life directed by Decima Francis, Gloria directed by Trevor Laird and This Way Up written by Peggy Bennette-Hume.

She was the first Black British performer to appear at Harlem's Apollo Theatre and had the first ever sell-out show by a female black comedian in London's West End. Her TV appearances include the BBC's The Real McCoy and Channel 4's Get Up, Stand Up, and presented The Saturday Morning Show on Choice FM. She was also a commentator on Grumpy Old Women in 2005.

== Stand-up comedy ==
From 1985 Le Mar cut her teeth on the comedy circuit, by initially doing open spots and warm-ups at events such as fashion shows and parties within the black community. She later rose to prominence on the emerging black comedy circuit in the 1990s, sharing the stage with established comedians such as Felix Dexter, Curtis Walker, Ishmael Thomas and Leo Chester all members of the BBC comedy series The Real McCoy. Her popularity earned her the title "The Queen of Black Comedy".

Her reputation took her to the mainstream circuit where she became a regular act at established comedy clubs including Up The Creek, Jongleurs and The Comedy Store, culminating in Le Mar performing her sell-out one woman show Off The Hook at the Apollo Theatre, Shaftesbury Avenue, in 2000. She also gained international acclaim when she performed at the Apollo Theatre, New York, and the Comedy Act Theatre in Los Angeles.

Le Mar celebrated 25 years in her show An Audience with Angie Le Mar, "Celebrating 25 years", at the Barbican Theatre in September 2010.

== Theatre ==
Le Mar launched her professional theatre career in 1994 with her comedy sketch show Funny Black Women on the Edge that premiered at The Civic Centre in Southwark, London, which she wrote and also made her first directing debut, playing several characters. The show went on to play at the Edinburgh Fringe Festival, at the Gilded Balloon in the same year. The show played at the Theatre Royal Stratford East in November 1995, directed by Paulette Randall

The show was reprised again in 2007 The Best of Funny Black Women on The Edge through Le Mar's production company Straight To Audience Productions', at the Hackney Empire, directed by Jo Martin and Dawn Reid.

Le Mar wrote her show The Brothers, which was originally aired as a radio production on Choice FM, produced by Ivor Etienne. Written in 2006 and directed by Le Mar, the show made its theatre debut at the Hackney Empire and became the fastest-selling show there since Hamlet. The Brothers was also recorded for television and shown on MTV Base.

In 2007 Le Mar wrote Do You Know Where Your Daughter Is?. While working as a radio presenter on Choice FM, Le Mar was moved by a call she received on her phone in show from a distressed young lady who had been abused by her boyfriend. The contents of the call inspired her to write the play, which was targeted predominantly to young audiences and parents. The play premiered at the Hackney Empires' Acorn Theatre and ran for eight weeks. It was toured throughout the London Region and the suburbs between 2008 and 2009, and played at the Edinburgh Fringe Festival, Gilded Balloon in August 2010. There are ongoing plans to tour the show nationally in 2011.

The most recent play written by Le Mar is Forty in which she played the character "Sandra" was premiered at the Hackney Empire in 2008 and again at The Broadway Theatre, Catford, in 2009, directed by Karena Johnson. Discussions are ongoing for a television series. Le Mar directed other productions, including Waiting to Inhale, written by comedian and broadcaster Geoff Schumann, which played at the Theatre Royal Stratford East in 1997, Will The Real Wayne Rollins Stand Up one-man show at the Hackney Empires' Bullion Room Theatre in 2002, and Big Sister featuring Donna Spence and Quincy, also at Hackney's Bullion Room Theatre in 2003.

Le Mar continues to work with young people through her production company Straight To Audience Productions, and has set up a strand within the organisation called 'Straight To Audience Youth' (STAY). Her workshops include writing and directing and stand-up comedy masterclasses.

== Television ==
Le Mar's television appearances includes the successful comedy sketch show The Real McCoy, BBC, Late Licence, Channel 4, presented by Mark Thomas and Johnny Vaughan, Get Up Stand Up, Channel 4, a comedy sketch show. As well as appearing in different roles, Le Mar contributed to the writing and character development for the programme. Le Mar appeared as a panelist on the comedy review show Blouse & Skirt, BBC. A commentator in the BBC series Grumpy Old Women, and a cameo role in the BBC's Holby City.

Le Mar made her first appearance as a panelist on ITV's popular lunchtime programme Loose Women aired on 2 February 2011. Through her own production company, Straight To Audience Productions, Le Mar has commissioned three projects that are in development for internet streaming. The Living Room will be an intimate setting in which Le Mar interviews personalities from the world of business, entertainment, politics, sport and lifestyle. Angie's Round The Table is a debate show presented by Le Mar, with six invited guests debating on social issues and topics that affect ordinary people, literally around a table set in a casual environment. The third project is called Women at the Top of Their Game, an interview programme with a small live audience, focusing on women who have reached the top of their chosen profession. Le Mar worked on a new TV sitcom called The Ryan Sisters, that was scheduled for production in 2012. 2019-Soon Gone: A Windrush Chronicle BBC Series 1:5. (Samantha 1993) Written by Angie Le Mar)

== Radio ==
As well as making many radio guest appearances, Le Mar presented the Angie Le Mar Show on BBC GLR 94.9fm from 1998 to 2000. Le Mar further established her radio credentials when she presented her Friday night show The Ladies Room and subsequently presented the Saturday morning Breakfast Show on Choice FM between 2000 and 2007. Her many guests included Stevie Wonder, Jermaine Jackson, Danny Glover, Idris Elba, Mica Paris, Maya Angelou and Mary J. Blige to name but a few. Le Mar is a radio presenter on Colourful Radio, which she presents her show Time of The Month once every month.

Angie is a very regular guest/panelist on Eddie Nestor's Rumshop and Kath Melandri Saturday Late show on BBC London 94.9. Since late 2011, Angie has been a regular deputy presenter to Kath Melandri on BBC London 94.9.

== New projects 2011 ==
Le Mar was working on her new one-woman show called In My Shoes, to premiere at the Soho Theatre, West End, on 16 October 2011. It is expected the show will also undertake a national tour of the UK, and the US in 2012–13. Le Mar was also writing a TV sitcom called the Ryan Sisters, which was to go into production with a premier cast including singer/actress Michelle Gayle, actress/TV presenter Josie d'Arby, actress/singer (Eternal) Kelle Bryan, and comedian, radio broadcaster Eddie Nestor, and Le Mar. The show was to premiere as a preview theatre production at the Fairfield Halls, Croydon, in March 2012.
