= Blouse and Skirt =

- Genre: Comedy
- Starring: Curtis Walker
- Country of origin: United Kingdom
- Original language: English
- No. of seasons: 1
- No. of episodes: 8

Production
- Production location: UK
- Running time: 30 minutes

Original release
- Network: BBC 2
- Release: 29 February – 21 March 2000

Blouse and Skirt is a short-lived BBC Television comedy show (it ran for eight episodes in 2000) that had a Question Time-style format but from a Black British perspective: regulars Curtis Walker and Gina Yashere were joined by guests to take a satirical look at topical subjects, prompted by questions from the audience. Those appearing on Blouse and Skirt included Felix Dexter, Angie Le Mar, Roy Diamond, Robbie Gee, Jocelyn Jee Esien, Rudi Lickwood, Slim, Helen Da Silva, Charlie Hale, Many Newton, Junior Simpson and Leo Muhammed.

== Cast ==
- Tony Morris - Host
- Curtis Walker
- Gina Yashere
- Robbie Gee
- Eddie Nestor
