= Teletubbies – The Album =

Teletubbies - The Album

Studio album by Teletubbies
- Released: 3 November 1998
- Recorded: 1997–1998
- Genres: Children's music Pop music
- Length: 49:50
- Labels: BBC Worldwide Music (United Kingdom); Kid Rhino (United States)

Singles from Teletubbies – The Album
- 1. "Teletubbies say "Eh-oh!"" Released: 1 December 1997

Professional ratings
Review scores
Source	Rating
AllMusic	3/5 stars
Austin Chronicle	5/5 stars

Teletubbies – The Album is an album that was released based on the British children's television show Teletubbies owned by the BBC. The album's single "Teletubbies Say 'Eh-oh!'" was a number-one hit album in the UK singles chart in December 1997 and reached number 13 in the Dutch Singles Chart in late 1998.

Teletubbies - The Cast contains the characters of:

- Po (played by Pui Fan Lee)
- Dipsy (played by John Simmit)
- Tinky Winky (played by Simon Shelton)
- Laa-Laa (played by Nikky Smedley)
- The Sun Baby (played by Jessica Smith)
- The Narrator (played by Tim Whitnall)

== Track listing ==
No.	Title	Length
1.	"The Puddle/Splashing Dance"	3:26
2.	"The Three Ships"	2:21
3.	"Dirty Knees"	5:07
4.	"The Twisty Dance"	2:39
5.	"The Animal Parade"	2:30
6.	"Dipsy's Fancy Hat"	4:08
7.	"The Running Away Dance"	2:55
8.	"Teletubbies say 'Eh-oh!'"	3:32
9.	"The Up and Down Dance"	3:36
10.	"Jumping for Fun"	6:09
11.	"The Magic Tree"	1:50
12.	"Follow My Leader Remix"	3:16
13.	"Clouds"	5:21
14.	"Lullaby"	3:00

== National chart performances ==
Chart	Position
Belgium Albums Chart (Vl)	29
Belgium Albums Chart (Wa)	36
French Albums Chart	43
Dutch Albums Chart	41

== Personnel ==
=== Teletubbies ===
- Dipsy (John Simmit) - Vocals (on Teletubbies say Eh-oh! and Dipsy's Fancy Hat), Piano, Keyboard, Synthesizer, Organ, Harpsichord, Mellotron, Rhodes piano
- Tinky Winky (Simon Shelton) - Vocals (all tracks except Dipsy's Fancy Hat), Guitars
- Po (Pui Fan Lee) - Vocals (on Teletubbies say Eh-oh!), Drums
- Laa-Laa (Nikky Smedley) - Vocals (on Teletubbies say Eh-oh!), Bass

=== Musicians ===
==== Teletubbies Say Eh-oh! ====
- Jimmy Johnson, Albhy Galuten, Barry Beckett - guitars
- Donald "Duck" Dunn - bass
- Roger Hawkins - drums
- Bill Payne - piano

==== Baa, Baa, Black Sheep ====
- Jimmy Johnson, Albhy Galuten, Barry Beckett - guitars
- Donald "Duck" Dunn - bass
- Roger Hawkins - drums

==== Mary, Mary, Quite Contrary ====
- David Lindley - fiddle
- Kelly Emberg - vocals
- Bruce Miller - string arrangements
- Bill Payne - piano
- Pete Sears - Harpsichord

==== Dipsy's Fancy Hat ====
- Tim Whitnall - narrator
- Pete Sears - Piano
- Irene Chanter - background vocals
- Ray Cooper - percussion
- Jimmy Johnson, Steve Crooper, Fred Tackett, Barry Beckett - guitars
