= The Real McCoy (TV series) =

BBC Television comedy show that ran from 1991 to 1996

- Title card for series 2–4
- Genre: Comedy
- Starring: Curtis Walker; Ishmael Thomas; Llewella Gideon; Collette Johnson; Leo Chester; Robbie Gee; Meera Syal; Eddie Nestor; Judith Jacob; Felix Dexter; Kulvinder Ghir
- Country of origin: United Kingdom
- Original language: English
- No. of series: 5 (+1 clip show series)
- No. of episodes: 30 (+4 clip show episodes)

Production
- Executive producer: Curtis Walker
- Producer: BBC
- Production location: Television Centre, London
- Running time: 30 minutes

Original release
- Network: BBC 2
- Release: 10 May 1991 – 9 February 1996

The Real McCoy is a BBC Television sketch comedy show that ran from 10 May 1991 to 9 February 1996 featuring an array of black and Asian comedy stars and featured many famous guest appearances, including Leo Muhammad, Ian Wright, Linford Christie and Frank Bruno.

== Development ==
The producer of the first two series, Charlie Hanson, was the co-founder of the Black Theatre Co-operative (now NitroBeat) and had produced No Problem! and Desmond's before creating The Real McCoy. He was working with a double act named Curtis and Ishmael (Curtis Walker and Ishmael Thomas) at the 291 Club at the Hackney Empire and suggested making a television version. However, the BBC opted for a totally new sketch series, launching The Real McCoy. Llewella Gideon and Collette Johnson, who were also the double act Short, Sharp and Shocking, made up the main initial quartet of writer-performers. Soul II Soul frontman Jazzie B co-wrote the title theme.

== Casting ==
Walker, Thomas, Gideon and Johnson were given top billing in the opening credits of the first series. Walker and Thomas were billed under their double act name "Curtis and Ishmael" in the closing credits. In addition to the main quartet, Robbie Gee and Leo Chester also appeared in every episode of series 1. Further recurring semi-regulars included Meera Syal, Kulvinder Ghir and Perry Benson. Kathy Burke and broadcaster Alan Towers also appeared in the series.

For series 2, a new animated title sequence was used with a new theme by Overlord X. The main six performers again appeared in every episode (although Gideon was unable to attend the recording of the final episode). Syal and Benson also returned as semi-regulars, alongside newcomer Maureen Hibbert. Ghir did not appear in this series.

Series 3, saw some big changes to the main line-up. Walker, Thomas and Johnson did not return. Meera Syal was promoted to a regular, with newcomers Eddie Nestor and Judith Jacob also joining the main cast. A seventh main cast member Felix Dexter appeared each week, performing solo material from his repertoire of characters. Hollyoaks actor Nick Pickard appeared in the first episode.

In series 4, the same seven writer-performers returned to make up the main cast. Kulvinder Ghir also appeared in every episode of series 4.

For series 5, Ghir was promoted to the main cast, which now made eight regulars. For this series, Jo Martin also appeared in every episode as Botney, controller of BBC universal intergalactic TV transmission, during the Rub A Dub sketches and in other roles.

== Format ==
Although mainly a sketch comedy show, the dance troupe Danserious also performed short routines throughout the first series with longer routines to entire songs in series two.

In series 3, the dance sections were replaced with studio performances from a different musical act each week including The Real Thing, Ruby Turner & Junior, Mica Paris and Macka B.

From Series 4, the music acts were replaced with stand-up routines from guests such as Junior Simpson, Toju, John Simmit and Angie Le Mar. In series 5, Richard Blackwood, Rudi Lickwood and Ian Edwards were amongst the stand-up guests.

== Episodes ==
Series	Episodes	Originally aired	
Series	Episodes	First in the series	Last in the series
1	6	10 May 1991	14 June 1991
2	6	6 July 1992	10 August 1992
3	6	7 May 1993	11 June 1993
4	6	9 August 1994	13 September 1994
The Best Of	4	3 November 1995	24 November 1995
5	6	5 January 1996	9 February 1996

== Most appearances ==
Excluding the four broadcast clip show episodes and the two VHS clip show episodes.

30 episodes (all regular episodes)

- Robbie Gee
- Leo Chester

29 episodes

- Llewella Gideon

25 episodes

- Meera Syal

18 episodes

- Eddie Nestor
- Judith Jacob
- Felix Dexter
- Kulvinder Ghir

12 episodes

- Curtis Walker
- Ishmael Thomas
- Collette Johnson

9 episodes

- Perry Benson

6 episodes

- Leon Black

5 episodes

- Maureen Hibbert

== Reception ==
The show was very successful, quickly becoming a cult hit and reaching audiences of 5 million.

Its popularity attracted many famous guests. In series 2, John Virgo made a cameo in a snooker-themed sketch.

From series 3, a recurring sketch was an EastEnders spoof called The Rub-A-Dub in which celebrities Linford Christie, Andi Peters (with Edd the Duck), Colin McMillan, Mica Paris, Tessa Sanderson, Norman Beaton appeared as themselves.

In series 4, guests in the segment were Frank Bruno, Saracen from Gladiators, Ian Wright, Carmen Munroe, Omar and Lennox Lewis.

In series 5, John Barnes, Saeed Jaffrey, Lisa I'Anson, Jazzie B, Maxi Priest and Judy Simpson appeared in the segment.

In December 1994, a short special aired as part of Fry and Laurie Host A Christmas Night with the Stars.

In November 1995, a 4-part clip show series aired called The Best of the Real McCoy.

== Legacy ==
Following the show's success, Felix Dexter was given his own pilot sketch show Felix Dexter on TV, as part of the Comic Asides series of pilots, which was broadcast on BBC Two in September 1995. Dexter also wrote and starred in the sitcom pilot Douglas broadcast on BBC Two in August 1996, based around his lawyer character from The Real McCoy. Neither pilot was picked up for a full series, despite positive reception. Douglas was repeated on BBC Two in March 2021 under the name Felix Dexter in Douglas as part of the BBC's Festival of Funny.

Meera Syal and Kulvinder Ghir went on to co-create Goodness Gracious Me for BBC Radio 4 in 1996, before adapting it for TV in 1998.

Also in 1996, a 15-minute pilot was shot for The Rub-a-Dub, which had been an ongoing black EastEnders spoof in the series (later becoming The Rub-a-Dub in Space), with only some original cast members reprising their roles and with various character and setting changes. The pilot was never broadcast and not picked up for a series.

Robbie Gee and Jo Martin went on to star in BBC One sitcom The Crouches in 2003 which ran for two series, and in which Llewella Gideon also appeared.

After spoofing EastEnders in the show, Robbie Gee went on to appear in the soap as Dexter Mulholland in 2009. Stand-up guest Richard Blackwood also later appeared as Vincent Hubbard.

Meera Syal and Jo Martin both went on to appear in the BBC comedy drama Back To Life.

Robbie Gee and Jo Martin both appeared together in the 2023 BBC comedy Black Ops.

Llewella Gideon and Jo Martin both appeared in the 2024 film Hard Truths.

Over the years, there have been various live reunion shows.

== Availability ==
In 1994, a VHS simply titled The Real McCoy was released. It featured over 20 of the show's best sketches from series three, edited into two 45-minute episodes.

Despite the show's popularity, it has never been released on DVD, though a sketch from the series featuring overdubbed footage from the Doctor Who serial Earthshock was later included as an Easter egg in that serial's 2003 DVD release.

Series one was made available for download on the short-lived BBC Store.

All five series were made available for streaming on the BBC iPlayer from July 2020 for 12 months. It had previously been believed that the master tapes had been lost.

All five series were made available for streaming on the UK version of BritBox from September 2022.
