= Nick Kellington =

British actor and musician (born 1975)

Nicholas Chee Ping Kellington (born 5 June 1975) is a British actor and musician. He is best known for his roles in children's television series, the new Star Wars films and The Dark Crystal: Age of Resistance. His television acting career began in 2007, when he portrayed Igglepiggle in the CBeebies show In the Night Garden....

In 2010, he played Tang in "ZingZillas" also for CBeebies and in 2015, he took on the role of Dipsy the green Teletubby in the reboot of Teletubbies, previously portrayed by John Simmit before it went into a 14-year hiatus. He reprised his role as Dipsy in the upcoming Netflix reboot of Teletubbies.

Kellington appeared in the 2016 Star Wars film Rogue One as Bistan, a Rebel Alliance gunner.

He also appears in 2017's Star Wars: The Last Jedi as Snook Uccorfay, a mole-like playboy in the casino city of Canto Bight.

In 2018, Kellington played Ned the Neanderthal in the two-part documentary series Neanderthals : Meet Your Ancestors, presented by Ella Al-Shamahi and broadcast on BBC Four in May 2018. A VixPix Films production in association with Imaginarium Productions and the BBC.

In 2019, he appeared in The Dark Crystal: Age of Resistance as the creature suit performer providing the body movements for skekMal/The Hunter, one of the Skeksis new to the series.

Kellington played cornet and ukulele in the rock band Ella Guru.

== Filmography ==
- In the Night Garden... (2007–2009), Igglepiggle
- Gigglebiz (2009–2019) Various
- Doctor Who (2008), Sontaran warrior
- ZingZillas (2010–2012), Tang
- Strange Hill High (2012), senior puppeteer
- Muppets Most Wanted (2014), UK additional Muppet performer (uncredited)
- Teletubbies (2015–2018), Dipsy
- Rogue One: A Star Wars Story (2016), Bistan
- Star Wars: The Last Jedi (2017), Snook Uccorfay
- Neanderthals : Meet Your Ancestors (2018), Ned
- Solo: A Star Wars Story (2018), puppeteer
- Slaughterhouse Rulez (2018), Monster and protestor
- The Dark Crystal: Age of Resistance (2019), SkekMal / The Hunter
- Star Wars: The Rise of Skywalker (2019), Klaud
- Beetlejuice Beetlejuice (2024), Bob
