= List of Bing episodes =

Episode list for an animated series

This is a complete list of episodes of the British animated children's series Bing, which aired from 2014 to 2015, with new episodes in 2019, totalling 105 episodes. Each episode has a duration of 7 minutes.

== Series overview ==
Series	Episodes	Originally released	
Series	Episodes	First released	Last released
1	78	9 June 2014	20 May 2015
2	27	30 October 2019	12 December 2019

== Episodes ==
=== Series 1 (2014–15) ===
No.	Title	Original release date
1	"Fireworks"	9 June 2014
Bing thinks he is brave enough to watch fireworks outside in the garden.
2	"Bye Bye"	10 June 2014
Bing plays enthusiastically with a new orange balloon and bursts it, which makes him sad, but Flop puts it in his bye-bye box instead.
3	"Swing"	11 June 2014
Bing and Pando squabble taking in turns going on the swing and the swing accidentally knocks him over.
4	"Blocks"	12 June 2014
Bing builds a tower of blocks, but disaster strikes when he gets upset.
5	"Duck"	13 June 2014
Bing and Sula go to the park to feed the ducks. Sula is very good at standing quietly and giving the ducks just the right amount of food. Bing throws all his duck food in the water in one go and gets more than he bargained for when a goose comes to eat it.
6	"Smoothie"	16 June 2014
Bing was upset for his carrot when disaster strikes that the milk turns into a carrot smoothie.
7	"Frog"	17 June 2014
Bing and Sula find a frog in the garden. They want to keep it so decide to make the frog a 'house' in a bucket. When froggy doesn't like her new home and hops out, Flop helps them understand they've not thought enough about what the frog needs in its home.
8	"Car Park"	18 June 2014
Bing wants to play his car park game with Flop, but Charlie is visiting and keeps messing up the game. Bing wants Charlie to go away so Flop takes Charlie to play in the kitchen, but Bing doesn't enjoy his game on his own and finds out that some games are better played together.
9	"Shadow"	19 June 2014
Bing has fun seeing his shadow but is upset that he can't see it in the dark.
10	"Musical Statues"	20 June 2014
It is Bing's turn to choose the game - Musical Statues. Flop gets the music going and soon all the children are dancing like crazy. Much to Bing's distress, Pando wins. Since Bing chose the game, he thinks he should have won. Fortunately, Charlie never stopped dancing and his dance gets him back on his feet.
11	"Voo Voo"	23 June 2014
Bing has a mishap which he helps to clear up with the help of Voo Voo the vacuum cleaner and the car gets sucked up, so Flop gets his car out of Voo Voo's tummy.
12	"Here I Go"	24 June 2014
Bing finds the new slide at the playground too scary for him to go down.
13	"Growing"	25 June 2014
After having his height measured incorrectly by Coco, Bing gets scared that he is shrinking.
14	"Atchoo!"	26 June 2014
Bing catches a cold so Flop decides that he needs to stay at home instead.
15	"Hide and Seek"	27 June 2014
Bing chooses not to use the toilet train before a game of hide and seek, resulting in him wetting himself. He, however, decided to put on pants instead, now that he is all clean. Note: The idea of Bing wetting himself was taken from the Bing Bunny book "Get Dressed".
16	"Bake"	30 June 2014
Bing and Flop are making ginger bunny biscuits for Charlie and Coco, but the kitchen timer isn't heard over conversation and the biscuits get burnt. They decorate the biscuits. Note: The idea of burning the biscuits gave rise to a passage in the 2009 Bing Bunny book "Something for Mummy" where Bing burns the toast.
17	"Train"	1 July 2014
Bing and Pando experiment with Bing's toy train on the Fun Fort in the playground, but when it accidentally breaks into pieces, Bing rebuilds it as a rocket ship instead.
18	"Say Goodbye"	2 July 2014
Bing and Sula are having so much fun playing together they don't want to say goodbye to each other. They try hiding Sula's shoes but she is angered to find that Bing hid one in the toilet.
19	"Lost"	3 July 2014
Bing loses Hoppity Voosh in the park and needs Amma's help to find him again.
20	"Picnic"	4 July 2014
After several false starts to get out on a picnic Bing and Flop are finally ready to leave - when it starts to rain. Bing is very disappointed but as they unpack the wheelie bag he realises they can have their picnic indoors instead.
21	"Balloon"	8 September 2014
Bing and Sula invent a noisy game with a helium balloon they find stuck in a tree. When the balloon flies away, however, the two hold Flop instead.
22	"Dressing Up"	9 September 2014
Bing and Coco both need a crown to complete their outfits, but there is only one.
23	"Something for Sula"	10 September 2014
Bing makes Sula a picture with all her favourite things on it.
24	"Knack"	11 September 2014
Bing is frustrated when all his own knacks are easy for everyone else to do too. When Pando accidentally lands on Bing's ear, Bing discovers his own special knack, moving his ears.
25	"Hearts"	12 September 2014
Bing and Sula tag their favourite things around the house with heart-shaped "stickies". Bing wants to put a sticky note on Hoopity, since hoppity is Bing's favourite toy.
26	"Storytime"	15 September 2014
Bing's favourite book, "Hoppity Voosh And The Moonkeeper", falls in the bath when he joins in with the story too energetically, so he and Flop make up the rest of the story.
27	"Giving"	16 September 2014
Bing enjoys choosing the perfect present for Sula, but then wants to keep it for himself.
28	"Hula Hoop"	17 September 2014
Bing tries Coco's hula hoop and finds out that it is harder than it looks. Bing spins too fast, trips, and breaks the hula hoop, causing Bing to fall and Coco can't do hulas with Holly, but Bing did skipping.
29	"Big Boots"	18 September 2014
Bing and Sula play at being giants and splashing in puddles with their big boots.
30	"Bubbles"	19 September 2014
Bing and Pando learn to blow bubbles. Pando soon gets the hang of it, but Bing struggles. When Bing does blow one, however, Pando pops it, so Bing made bubbles by moving the wand instead.
31	"Paddling Pool"	22 September 2014
Bing and Sula find that there is no water in the paddling pool and invent new pool games.
32	"Blankie"	23 September 2014
Bing inadvertently urinates on his blanket while wearing it on the toilet. Fortunately his toy has a cape just as soft.
33	"Boo"	24 September 2014
Coco shows Bing how to do really good big boos, and together they make Flop jump, but Bing scares Charlie by mistake.
34	"Talkie Taxi"	25 September 2014
Bing and Sula discover a new toy at Amma's crèche - a talking ride-on car. Talkie Taxi, however, kept saying the same things over and over.
35	"Kite"	26 September 2014
It is a windy day and Bing wants to fly his Hoppity Voosh kite with Flop.
36	"More"	29 September 2014
At bathtime Bing just can't help adding a few more squirts of 'bubble goo', until he gets more bubbles than he can handle.
37	"Sparkle Magic"	30 September 2014
Bing goes to play with Sula, who is engrossed in a game of sparkle magic when he arrives. Bing wants to play too, but Sula won't let him. Bing accidentally sneezes, causing the fairy dust to disappear. Sula is so upset until she finds out that there is sparkle magic everywhere.
38	"Tree"	1 October 2014
Bing wants to dig the biggest hole and gets upset when Pando accidentally fills it in. It takes Flop to show them how they can work together.
39	"Where's Flop?"	2 October 2014
Flop goes to the shop to get some carrots for his lunch. Bing stays behind but it is not long before he starts to miss Flop. When trying to look for him, however, he jams his fingers in the letterbox.
40	"Lunchbox"	3 October 2014
Bing's brand new Hoppity Voosh lunchbox is the same as Pando's. At first they find it fun, but things go downhill when they get their lunchboxes mixed up.
41	"Sleepover"	17 November 2014
Coco is staying at Bing's house for her first sleepover.
42	"Surprise Machine"	18 November 2014
Bing and Sula have a coin each for the surprise machine in Padget's shop.
43	"Dizzy"	19 November 2014
Bing learns that a little dizzy is fun, but too much dizzy is no fun at all.
44	"House"	20 November 2014
Coco decides that Bing's house made of sofa cushions is perfect for a game of Big Bad Wolf.
45	"Ice Lolly"	21 November 2014
Before Bing and Flop can eat their ice lollies, a frog hops into Bing's paddling pool. The lollies melt by the time they return.
46	"Mural"	24 November 2014
Bing and Sula are painting a mural at Amma's crèche, until Bing's enthusiastic rainbow painting makes paint run all over Sula's tree. Sula is upset, until Flop and Amma help them see that the painting isn't spoiled, but just different.
47	"Hiding"	25 November 2014
Bing and Flop play hide and seek on the way to Padget's shop. Bing doesn't want the game to end when they arrive, so he hides behind the store room door where Flop really can't see him. When the door slams shut, Bing is stuck inside. Note: The idea of Bing losing track of Flop was taken from the Bing Bunny book "Bedtime".
48	"Sandcastle"	26 November 2014
Bing and Flop are building a sandcastle when Pando joins them with his digger toy. Bing finds a 'pokey thing' to decorate the top of his castle, not realizing it belongs to Pando's digger.
49	"Acorns"	27 November 2014
Bing and Sula are in the park with Flop, collecting acorns. When Bing's pile keeps getting smaller Flop suggests they hide behind a bush to see what's happening to them.
50	"Jingly Shoes"	28 November 2014
Bing finds his old baby shoes, but they are too small for him now. When they are a perfect fit for baby Charlie, Bing has a hard time letting them go to a new home.
51	"Looking After Flop"	1 December 2014
Flop is feeling poorly so Bing decides to look after him, but when Bing tries to make Flop a honey-lemon drink, he ends up making a big mess instead.
52	"Music"	2 December 2014
It is music time at the crèche and everyone wants a turn on the drum. Bing gets impatient waiting for his turn but as he tries to grab the drum from Sula, he trips and breaks the drum.
53	"Hippoty Hoppity Voosh"	3 December 2014
Bing and Sula are playing with their favourite toys, Hoppity Voosh and Fairy Hippo. When Sula's Hippo gets stuck in a tree Bing throws Hoppity up to the rescue, only for Hoppity to get stuck too.
54	"Dragon Breath"	4 December 2014
Bing and Pando are playing outside in the cold, making steamy dragon breath. When Flop makes hot chocolate to warm Bing and Pando up, Bing doesn't wait for it to cool down to check its temperature and ends up burning his fingers. Note: This episode was pulled off the air by the BBC due to medical concerns about inappropriate use of ice to treat burns.
55	"Come on Charlie"	5 December 2014
Charlie is coming to play and Bing has planned lots of things for them to do. When Charlie doesn't want to play any of Bing's games, Bing is upset until Flop suggests they watch to see what Charlie really wants to do.
56	"Skateboard"	8 December 2014
Bing and Flop are at the park when they see Pando on a skateboard. After watching Pando skate up and down Bing can't wait to have a go himself, but it is much harder to balance than Pando makes it look, to the point where he falls off.
57	"Butterfly"	9 December 2014
Bing is at Amma's crèche when a butterfly flies in and lands on Sula's painting. Bing tries to help the butterfly go back outside by picking it up, but he kills the butterfly by squeezing it.
58	"Chalk Dinosaur"	10 December 2014
Bing draws a stripy, dotty chalk dinosaur on the pavement but just as he has finished a rain shower washes his picture away. Bing is devastated until he sees that a bit of dinosaur is left behind - the start of a new drawing.
59	"Potato"	11 December 2014
Bing and Sula find Nosey the potato in Amma's vegetable patch. They have a good time with Nosey until Nosey goes down the slide too fast on a car and breaks, Bing and Sula are both distraught, but Amma shows them how to plant both bits of potato so that they can grow new potatoes.
60	"Wellies"	12 December 2014
When Bing discovers a hole in his favourite yellow wellies, he doesn't want to throw them away in the stinky dustbin. With Flop's help, Bing finds a way to recycle his wellies into colourful flower pots instead.
61	"Ice Cream"	27 April 2015
When Bing and Flop hear Gilly's ice cream van, they race across the park to find her. Bing finally gets a yummy carroty ice cream, but as he waves goodbye to Gilly it falls on the ground. It is too late to call Gilly back again, so Flop makes Bing a fruit cone out of the remaining cone and some of his fruit kebab instead.
62	"Plasters"	28 April 2015
When Coco gets a plaster for a paper cut on her finger, Bing wants one too. He makes one out of sticky tape, but it is so sticky that it hurts when he tries to take it off. Bing doesn't want Flop to help so Flop comes up with a new game so that Bing can do it himself. Note: The idea of Bing's itchy plaster and Coco's papercut was taken from the Bing Bunny book "Bing's Sticky Plaster".
63	"Cat"	29 April 2015
On the way to Padget's shop Bing and Flop meet Arlo the cat. Bing loves Arlo and knows just where he likes to be stroked and what games he likes playing. On the way home, Bing spots a new cat to play with, but this one isn't so friendly, at least at first.
64	"Dandelion"	30 April 2015
Bing and Flop find dandelions in the park. Bing has fun blowing the seeds off lots of them, and decides to take the last one as a present to Sula. Bing has to keep the dandelion safe while crossing the whole of the big windy park, only for Sula to scatter the seeds accidentally as she hugs Bing.
65	"Voosh"	1 May 2015
Bing is vooshing with Hoppity in the garden, making him fly higher and higher, until with one big throw Hoppity disappears. Bing eventually finds Hoppity in the washing-up bowl, all wet and mucky. Bing is upset until Flop helps him to give Hoppity a bath in the sink.
66	"Nature Explorer"	4 May 2015
Bing and his friends play Nature Explorers in Amma's garden, spinning a big colour wheel and finding something in the garden that matches each colour. When it is Bing's turn to find something red, he doesn't look carefully before he tries to pick a raspberry and pricks his finger.
67	"Choosing"	5 May 2015
Bing has enough money to buy one thing in Padget's shop, but finds it hard to choose between all the exciting toys. He eventually chooses the camper van toy, but on the way home with Flop he begins to regret his decision.
68	"Dark"	6 May 2015
It is bedtime, and Bing needs to find Hoppity. Bing remembers playing with him in the garden but now it is all dark out there and he doesn't really like the dark. Flop finds Bing's orange and green torch and together they set off into the dark on an adventure.
69	"Stuck"	7 May 2015
Bing and Sula have a lovely time in the park climbing in the trees.
70	"Cake"	8 May 2015
Bing accidentally knocks down the cake he made, making his friends and Sula sad.
71	"Not Yours"	11 May 2015
Bing and Flop go to Padget's Store to buy stuff but Bing gets a lollipop without paying for it.
72	"Mine"	12 May 2015
Bing and Pando found some shells on the beach and Pando sleeps in Bing's bed.
73	"Lunch"	13 May 2015
Bing and Sula want pasta for lunch with carrots and peas but Bings's pasta gets mixed up.
74	"Woof!"	14 May 2015
Bing and Flop see a dog in the park and Bing becomes friends with the dog. He throws a ball, lets her lick his hand and even spots dog poo. Gilly comes and says that the dog called Sunshine is Popsie's sister, and she looks after her every Tuesday. Bing is disappointed he can't keep her but he can always play with her on any Tuesday.
75	"Eggy Head"	15 May 2015
Bing and his friends are making an eggy head, which takes 7 days to grow, but Bing gets impatient and accidentally breaks his eggy head with the water hose. Bing makes a new one afterwards.
76	"Toy Party"	18 May 2015
Bing and Sula are having a tea party with their toys, however Sula gives more cake and tea to Pando more than Bing, and thus Bing pushes Sula. Amma shows the gang how to blow the angry to a cloud, it works and Bing and Sula say sorry to each other.
77	"Mobile Phone"	19 May 2015
Bing is playing with the "Talking Lettuce" app on Flop's phone with one rule, don't voosh near the phone, but he accidentally breaks it which make him sad. Flop then shows him that it still works, even with a cracked screen.
78	"Show"	20 May 2015
Bing and his friends are having a performance on the bandstand. Bing wants to sing the Rainybow song on the bandstand but gets stage fright, but thanks to his friends, he overcomes his fear. Note: The Rainybow song was on Youtube.

=== Series 2 (2019) ===
No.	Title	Original release date
79	"Nicky"	30 October 2019
Bing visits Sula's house and sees her little cousin Nicky, and they all make "rippy pictures" and have fun. Disaster happens, however, when Nicky went down the slide and broke his glasses. Note: This is the first episode to include new voice actors.
80	"Halloween"	31 October 2019
It is Halloween and everyone is dressing up. Bing is Biteysaurus, Sula is a fairy princess, Pando is a pirate, Coco is an Evil Queen and Charlie is a hedgehog but when Bing shows Charlie his costume he begins to cry and Bing thinks Charlie doesn't like him anymore. It turns out that Charlie was scared of his costume.
81	"Face Paint"	1 November 2019
Sula and Amma surprise Bing to show him Sula's sparkly painted butterfly face. Bing also wants a painted face, one that looks like Biteysaurus, and Sula says she can do it for him. Sula begins smothering his face in Bitey's signature green, but when she accidentally adds purple spots, Bing is horrified. He wants Sula to go home, but then Flop adds some teeth to Bing's Biteysaurus, so he can really be Bitey.
82	"Vaccination"	11 November 2019
It is vaccination day. Bing knows it might hurt a little but he is looking forward to the special shiny Hoppity Voosh sticker he will get from Doctor Molly. Bing is brave, but when he goes to get his sticker after his vaccination, he finds out that there are none left.
83	"Leaf Pictures"	12 November 2019
Bing and his friends are making leaf pictures in the woods. They take a piece of paper, place it on a leaf and rub a crayon onto it. They each choose their own leaf, but Coco's is whisked away by the wind. Luckily, Bing manages to catch it by stamping on it.
84	"Fire Engine"	12 November 2019
Bing is waiting to sit in the fire engine at the park. Pando and Sula both get a turn, but when it is Bing's go there is an emergency and the fire engine has to leave.
85	"Squiggle"	13 November 2019
Bing and Coco are drawing Gilly a picture. When she and Popsie arrive, Bing goes to say hello, but while he does so Charlie makes a big squiggle on Bing's drawing.
86	"PJ Party"	13 November 2019
Bing and Nicky are sleeping over at Sula's house, but Bing has forgotten Hoppity. The wind causes a branch to make a scratchy noise that terrifies Bing, who isn't very comforted by Sula's fairy rhino. Amma phones Flop, while Sula, Nicky and Bing play 'Nicky tickles' as they wait. Flop arrives, bringing his sleeping bag and Hoppity so they can all sleep over.
87	"Hose Pipe"	14 November 2019
Bing and Sula are painting in the garden Bing cleans his brush but spills the water and goes to get some more. Then the hose turns into a scary snake vooshing up.
88	"Birthday"	14 November 2019
It is Bing's birthday and he teaches Coco, Sula and Pando how to do the Waka-Oke. Pando, however, does it wrong, so Bing goes to his room out of shieness.
89	"Playhouse"	15 November 2019
Sula, Pando and Bing discover a bird's nest while making a playhouse in the shed. They try to find the bird by being super quiet, and she flies into their playhouse. When Bing goes in to look for her, she flies out again; they can't both be in the playhouse at the same time, so Bing decides to give the shed to her until her chicks have all grown up.
90	"Names"	15 November 2019
Pando is at Bing's house today and has an earworm called Bingly Bangly. Bing isn't impressed with this, declaring that he is Bing. When Pando can't resist saying the name, Bing knocks Pando's tower over and wants him to go home, but then Flop suggests they try a 'Thingly song' instead.
91	"Camping"	25 November 2019
Sula and Bing are camping in Bing's garden in order to see the stars and the moon. As Flop goes back for Hoppity, night-time noises seep from the dark garden, spooking Bing. Then, a scary shape on the tent terrifies him. They go inside, but the monster has followed them in.
92	"Bus Ride"	26 November 2019
When the seaside bus is broken, Bing, Pando, Flop and Padget starts making their own way home instead of going to the seaside in their own way because this trip was a complete disaster.
93	"Magnets"	27 November 2019
Coco is showing Bing how magnets work. While Coco builds a tower, Bing wants to find more magnetic things. In the garden he tests the ball, table and key, announcing which are magnetic. When Bing tries the watering can, he accidentally drops the magnet behind the flowerbed. Neither Bing nor Coco can reach it, so Flop shows them how to fish with magnets.
94	"Shop"	28 November 2019
While looking for things to sell in their shop, Bing and Sula find their old friend Mr Rainybow. They decide to sell him, and after a nice lady buys Mr Rainybow, that made Bing really sad.
95	"Ball"	29 November 2019
Bing and Pando are playing with the ball in Bing's garden, but then Bing breaks Flop's window.
96	"Accident"	1 December 2019
Bing hurt his arm and Molly tells him to rest but he tries to stroke Arlo, tries to play with his blocks and tries drinking his juice out of his Penguin cup and tries to do Hoppity Voosh but it gets hurty all the time. Amma tells him if he rests it for a few days it will get better.
97	"Puppet Show"	2 December 2019
Bing and Sula are having a puppet show with their toys.
98	"Charlie Did It"	3 December 2019
Bing and Charlie are playing with the ball outside.
99	"Helping Hoppity"	4 December 2019
Bing and Sula are playing with Hoppity, but he gets ripped on the floor.
100	"Story"	5 December 2019
Bing was reading a story to Charlie with Coco.
101	"Skipping"	8 December 2019
Bing and Sula are planting seeds at Amma's when Coco arrives with her new skipping rope. Coco teaches them how to skip, with Sula picking it up quicker than Bing. Just when Bing thinks he has succeeded, he hurts his leg on the watering can. Bing can't understand why he is not as good as Sula, but Coco shows Bing that, with some help, he can learn to skip too.
102	"Fossil"	9 December 2019
Bing and Sula are building a stone tower in the Howly Woods when Sula finds an ammonite. Bing wants to find one too but is overwhelmed by the amount of stones, which makes it very difficult to find one. A frustrated Bing sits down, and Sula notices some ammonites in the rock behind him. Flop takes a picture of Bing and Sula with their ammonites.
103	"Presents"	10 December 2019
Bing and Flop are opening presents and Bing got a Hoppity sleigh.
104	"Snow"	11 December 2019
Bing and Nicky are playing in the snow and they made a snowman.
105	"Christmas"	12 December 2019
It is Christmas today and Bing is celebrating the time of year, so come and have fun with Bing as he meets Nicky, Wrap up presents and play in the snow.
