= Robbie Gee =

British actor

- Born: 24 March 1970 (age 56)
- Occupation: Actor
- Years active: 1988–present

Robbie Gee (born 24 March 1970) is a British actor, best known for his Desmond's character Lee Stanley, for appearing in Guy Ritchie's crime caper Snatch, and for his comedy roles in TV series like The Real McCoy, Blouse and Skirt and The Crouches. He also appeared in the film Mean Machine, playing Trojan, Pirates of the Caribbean as Shrimper, Underworld as Kahn, and Dead Man Running as Curtis (Alongside 50 Cent).

Robbie is a founding member of GeeStor, and along with Eddie Nestor makes up one half of a comedy duo. Together, they have written for TV and hosted music events.

Gee hosted, alongside Eddie Nestor, the Imperial College Indian Society's annual "East Meets West" charity show in 2007 and 2008.

== Filmography ==
=== Film ===
Year	Title	Role	Notes
1998	In a Blue Room	Mike	Film
1999	G:MT – Greenwich Mean Time	Ricky	Film
2000	Snatch	Vinny	Film
2001	Dream	Greg	Film
2001	Mike Bassett: England Manager	Rufus Smalls	Film
2001	South West 9	Jel	Film
2001	Mean Machine	Trojan	Film
2003	Underworld	Kahn	Film
2004	Out of Reach	Lewis Morton	Film
2005	Chromophobia	Ricky	Film
2006	Rollin' with the Nines	Pushy	Film
2006	Pirates of the Caribbean: Dead Man's Chest	Shrimper – Montage	Film
2006	Life and Lyrics	Skool D	Film
2007	Deadmeat	Stan	Film
2008	Cass	Marlon	Film
2008	Hush	Chimponda	Film
2009	Dead Man Running	Curtis	Film
2010	Bad Day	Benjamin Radcliffe	Film
2010	Shank	Beano	Film
2010	Brucie		Short film
2014	Plastic	Mr X	Film
2014	Shadow Man	Albert	Short film
2016	The Habit of Beauty	PC Mansell	Film
2016	The Intent	Pastor Sam (uncredited)	Film
2017	Paddington 2	Mr Barnes	Film
2018	Walk Like a Panther	Zulu Dawn	Film
2018	Haircut	Jimmy	Short film
2019	Military Wives	Red	Film
2020	Alex Wheatle	Simeon	Film
2021	Zack Snyder's Justice League	Task Force Lead	Film
2021	The Kindred	Detective Shepherd	Film
2021	Boxing Day	Bilal	Film
2022	Three Day Millionaire	Wheezy	Film
2024	Paddington in Peru	Mr Barnes	Film

=== Television ===
Year	Title	Role	Notes
1989	The Firm	Snowy	TV film
1989	Saracen	Fanzu	1 episode
1989–1990	The Manageress	Tony Morris	8 episodes
1992	Underbelly	Jason	
1992	In Sickness and in Health	Footballer	1 episode
1994	Anna Lee	Jon	1 episode
1989–1994	Desmond's	Lee Stanley	52 episodes
1995	Pie in the Sky	D.C. Macnab	1 episode
1991–1996	The Real McCoy	Various	22 episodes
1996	Thief Takers	Dalton McQuarrie	1 episode
1998	In Exile	Bobo	1 episode
1999	Days Like These	Martin	1 episode
1999	Comin' Atcha!	Thomas	1 episode
1999	Roger Roger	Det. Sgt. Riley	1 episode
2000	The Vice	Maxwell	2 episodes
2000	Little Richard	Boss Man (as Robert Gee)	TV film
2000	Blouse and Skirt	Himself	4 episodes
2001	So What Now?	Bish	1 episode
2001	Kommissarie Winter	Frankie	2 episodes
2002	Dream Team	Linton Alexander	17 episodes
2003	Buried	Brewster Woolnough	1 episode
2003–2005	The Crouches	Roly Crouch	12 episodes
2005	Twisted Tales	Harry Travis	1 episode
2006	Ultimate Force	Monty	1 episode
2006	Prime Suspect	DI Traynor	2 episodes
2007	Murphy's Law	DCS Atwood	3 episodes
2007	Blue Murder	Colin Kent	1 episode
2008	The Fixer	Elviss Gilroy	1 episode
2009	Being Danny's Dire	Martino Roccos	TV film
1997–2009	EastEnders	Dexter/Thomas	5 episodes
1989–2010	The Bill	Claude Henry/Martin Wendell/Regis St. Claire	3 episodes
2010	Doctors	Gaz Burnham	1 episode
2010	Law & Order: UK	Jackson Marshall	1 episode
2011	Above Suspicion	Silas Roach	2 episodes
2004–2011	Holby City	Bob Weaver/Doug Stewart/Marty Pope	3 episodes
2011	The Fades	DCI Armstrong	6 episodes
2011	Death in Paradise	Renward	1 episode
2011–2012	Sadie J	Gary Gilmott	2 episodes
2013	Power to the People	Snoops	1 episode
2011–2014	Young Dracula	Ramanga	9 episodes
2014	Power to the People	Snoops	TV film
2014	Babylon	Darren	1 episode
2015	Cuffs	INSP Graham Webb	8 episodes
2016	Guilt	DCI Pike	10 episodes
2015–2017	The Frankenstein Chronincles	Billy Oates	6 episodes
2018–2019	Berlin Station	Kayode Adeyemi	5 episodes
2019	The Mallorca Files	Freddie Case	1 episode
2020	Bulletproof	Glenmore	1 episode
2021	Motherland	Garry	4 episodes
2021	Sliced		1 episode
2021	This Way Up	DJ Dis-Day	1 episode
2021	Silent Witness	Glen Scowcroft	1 episode
2022	Agatha Raisin	Terry Miller	1 episode
2022	Murder in Provence	Max Audigier	1 episode
2023	Extraordinary	Ian	3 episodes
2024	Sexy Beast	Mace Grant	1 episode
2024	Supacell	Mr. Johnson	2 episodes
