= Roland Muldoon =

English playwright and actor (born 1941)

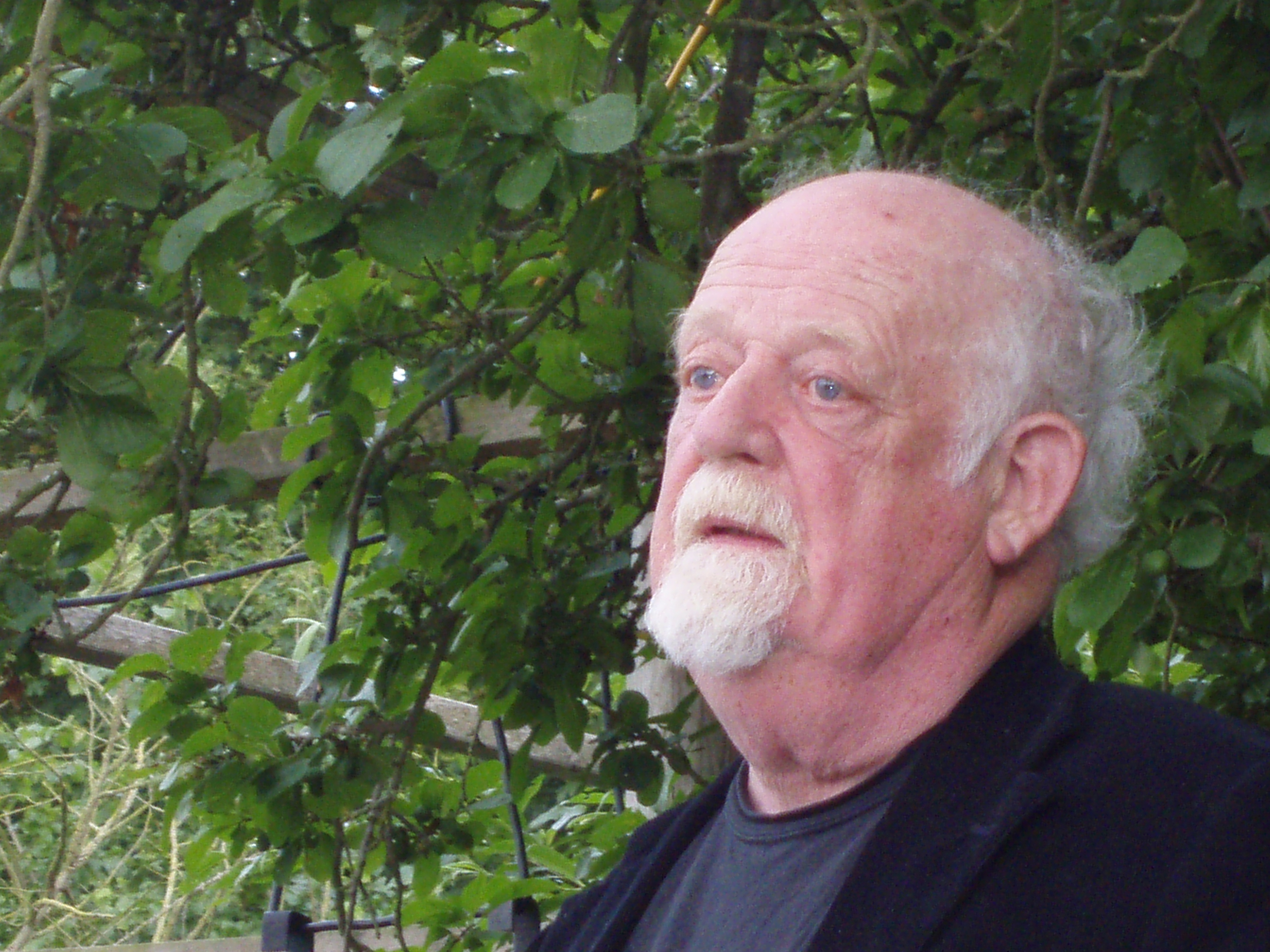
Muldoon in 2011

Roland Muldoon (born 1941) is an English playwright and actor.

== Life and career ==
Muldoon was born, in between air-raid warnings, in 1941 in Weybridge, Surrey. He left school in 1956 and worked in various jobs, ranging from city clerk to labourer, Brixham fish sorter to chainman on the new Victoria line. He studied stage management at the Bristol Old Vic Theatre School. It was in this city that he teamed up with life-time partner/wife, Claire.

In 1963 they joined London's Unity Theatre before setting up the underground political theatre group CAST (Cartoon Archetypical Slogan Theatre). Their debut was at the Peanuts Club off Liverpool Street set up by Jeff Nuttall. They claimed their work was Agit-Prop, frequently performing on the still-existing folk club circuit.

Their short fast-moving plays would feature Muggins characters who invariable are trying to make sense of the capitalist world. Their anti-Vietnam play John D Muggins is dead played in the Festival Hall and appeared in Peter Brooks U. S at the Roundhouse. CAST took Trials of Horatio Muggins and Mr Oligarchy's Circus to the Nancy Festival in 1969 they played student and factory occupations s.

In 1970, the group split. One half left and set up the Kartoon Klowns and later were the drive behind Rock against Racism. Claire and Roland reformed CAST, rehearsing every evening while in the day time Roland helped set up C.I.S Counter Information Services where they exposed the goings on of major global companies.

In 1976, CAST won an annual Arts Council Grant and they began a ten-year period of writing two plays a year; the most toured being The Return of Sam The Man M.P, a comic tragedy of the decline of the Labour Party.

In 1980, Roland received a Village Voice Obie award for his one-man play, Confessions of a Socialist.

In 1981, CAST set down a marker for the emerging comedy scene with its Sedition 81, a cabaret which executed the Monarchy, leading trade unionist amongst others, Roland gave a joint to the audience as a rebate from the state anticipating the arts cuts that the Tories planned in 1982, CAST created the New Variety circuit in London promoting a new wave of alternative comedy. Which went on to receive support from the Greater London Council, enabling it to run eight venues throughout London and establish the first modern comedy circuit? With performers such as Paul Merton the Joeys, Harry Enfield, Jo Brand Julian Clary and others, too many to mention.

In 1986, Roland, Claire and others from CAST took over the Hackney Empire variety theatre. Setting about modernising and restoring this jewel in the crown of the East End. The 1,300-seat Hackney Empire became a permanent base for their operations and ambitions. Roland became theatre director and the building was re-opened on 9 December 1986. It went on to establish itself as one of the leading comedy venues in Britain, where many of today's top comedians got their first break. Notably through the pivotal national comedy and new variety competition The Hackney Empire New Act of the Year (NATY)

Roland went on to co-star in the US movie Bucharest Express.

When they parted company with the Empire in 2005, Roland and Claire left behind a fully refurbished theatre. Their company CAST Presentations took over the Cock Tavern in London's Kilburn High Road and presented nights of comedy, music and new variety. The cocks logo was designed and donated to the company by the artist Ralph Steadman.

He has written and self-published his first novel, a political detective story The White Van Papers and in March 2013 published with Just Press his Hackney Empire memoirs, Taking on the Empire (How we saved the Hackney Empire for Popular Theatre), A tale of a rare phenomenon in arts history: how politically-inspired theatre group CAST saved an iconic East End building and held out for 20 years against the odds, presenting a unique program from new variety to Jamaican farce via opera and Hackney Hamlet.

He has in collaboration with his partner Claire alongside ex-Hackney Empire colleagues Frank Sweeney and Tony Goodrick, established the entertainment company New Variety Lives which produces and promotes the annual national comedy competition 'The New Acts of The Year' (The NATYS)

== Personal life ==
Claire and Roland have two children, Laura Jane and Alison Claire, and have two grandchildren, Ruby, Lucia and Silvia. They live in London and escape to Buckinghamshire accompanied by their Balloon Juggling Dog Sid Russell.

== See also ==
- Political drama
- Alternative comedy
- Hackney Empire New Act of the Year
