= Bing (TV series) =

British children's television series

- Logo used since 2014
- Genre: Preschool
- Created by: Ted Dewan
- Based on: Bing Bunny by Ted Dewan
- Developed by: Lucy Murphy; Mikael Shields
- Directed by: Nicky Phelan
- Voices of: Elliot Kerley; Mark Rylance
- Composer: Julian Nott
- Countries of origin: United Kingdom; Ireland
- Original language: English
- No. of series: 2
- No. of episodes: 105 (list of episodes)

Production
- Executive producers: Lucy Murphy; Philip Bergkvist; Howard Litton
- Producer: Mikael Shields
- Running time: 7 minutes
- Production companies: Acamar Films; Brown Bag Films; Tandem Films; Digitales Studios (series 2)

Original release
- Network: CBeebies (UK); Toon Kids, HRT 3 (HR); S4C (in Welsh language only)
- Release: 9 June 2014 – 12 December 2019

Bing is an animated children's television series based on the books by Ted Dewan and produced by Acamar Films. The series follows a pre-school male bunny named Bing as he experiences everyday issues.

Bing airs on CBeebies in the United Kingdom and Ireland and on S4C dubbed into Welsh. The series also aired on the streaming service BBC iPlayer. RAI in Italy premiered the series in 2018 on its Rai Yoyo channel. In the United States, the series started airing on Cartoon Network's Cartoonito programming block in September 2021. with an American voice cast, replacing the original British voice cast. The series premiered in France on France 5 in January 2023. Bing airs in 130 countries around the world and is available for streaming on YouTube across a network of 25 localized channels.

Bing has won numerous awards including an International Emmy Kids Award and a Writers' Guild Award. The Peek-a-Boo Bing soft toy has won a 2023 Made For Mums Gold Award.

== Plot ==
Every episode starts off with the narrator (Flop) saying "Round the corner not far away". In every episode, Bing encounters a problem, leading him to go to Flop for advice. Bing uses the advice to solve the problem. At the end of each episode, Bing recaps the episode's events, with Flop following up with "It's a Bing thing" before the show goes to credits.

== Characters ==
- Bing (voiced by Elliot Kerley in series 1 and Rafferty Railton in series 2 in the UK and Santino Barnard in the US) is a three-year-old black anthropomorphic bunny who is the titular protagonist of the series. His favourite toy is Hoppity Voosh, a rabbit superhero. Bing wears a green shirt, red and black chequered dungarees and black and white shoes. Bing loves to hum, whistle, pretend and do untroubling childlike things.
- Flop (voiced by Mark Rylance in series 1 and David Threlfall in series 2) is Bing's caregiver, and guides Bing through his toddler life, entertaining and soothing him whenever Bing faces a problem. Flop is a short orange-skinned creature and is presumably a stuffed toy rabbit.
- Sula (voiced by Eve Bentley in series 1 and Poppie Boyes in series 2 in the UK and Annabelle Chow in the US) is a brown anthropomorphic elephant who is one of Bing's best friends. She wears a pink and yellow dress with trousers, magenta socks and golden sparkly shoes. Her favourite toy is Fairy Hippo (as revealed in "Hearts"), a hippo dressed up as a fairy.
- Amma (voiced by Akiya Henry) is Sula's guardian, who runs the créche and park café. The child characters in the series sometimes visit. Amma is a short blue-skinned elephant-like creature and is presumed to be a stuffed toy elephant.
- Pando (voiced by Shai Portnoy in series 1, Noah Hicks in series 2 and Jude Riordan in series 3 in the UK and Micah Gursoy in the US) is an anthropomorphic panda who is Bing's second best friend and lives next door to him. Pando shares his catchphrase, "Hoppity-voosh!" with Bing. Pando wears a white shirt, black shoes and white briefs. He is often seen wearing yellow shorts, before taking them off at the earliest possible opportunity, remaining in his underwear.
- Padget (voiced by Bryony Hannah in the UK and Molly Wurwand in the US) is Pando's guardian, who runs the corner shop near to where Bing lives. Padget can sometimes be spotted out jogging or driving her yellow tuk-tuk. Padget is a short green-skinned creature, also presumed to be a stuffed animal.
- Coco (voiced by Jocelyn Macnab in the UK and Alivia Clark in the US) is a white anthropomorphic bunny who is Bing's cousin and Charlie's older sister, and is a bit of a control freak. Coco is the oldest of the child characters at age 10.
- Charlie (voiced by Poppy Hendley) is a white anthropomorphic bunny who is Coco's one-year-old baby brother and Bing's cousin who cannot speak. Charlie puts everything in his mouth, causing the others to say, "Don't chew it, Charlie!"
- Molly (voiced by Saffron Jones in series 1 and Tamsin Greig in series 2) is Coco and Charlie's caregiver, who also works as a doctor. Molly is a small red-skinned creature often seen wearing glasses and a white lab coat. She appears briefly in every introduction, seemingly allowing Coco and Charlie to walk along with Bing and Flop, waving goodbye and driving off in her light blue tuk-tuk.

=== Series 2 ===
- Nicky (voiced by Xavi Nixon) is a small anthropomorphic brown elephant who is Sula's younger cousin. Nicky wears glasses, an orange t-shirt, blue & white sneakers and blue dungarees. Nicky is often the source of disagreement between Bing and Sula.

== Production ==
Bing was based on the Bing Bunny book series, written and illustrated by Ted Dewan. Acamar Films acquired the rights to Bing Bunny and produced the programme in conjunction with Brown Bag Films and Tandem Films. Acamar Films CEO, Mikael Shields selected Bing for development because he believed that the stories within Bing had potential to support young-children and help them to develop life-long resilience. The series was developed for CBeebies though initial episodes were viewable at MIPTV.

Mikael Shields was voice director for the series and served as a writer on the programme.

23 external writers, five internal writers, three Montessori teachers, American educators, and English language development experts were involved in the production of each series.

== Episodes ==
Series	Episodes	Originally released	
Series	Episodes	First released	Last released
1	78	9 June 2014	20 May 2015
2	27	30 October 2019	12 December 2019

== Awards and nominations ==
Year	Award	Category	Nominee	Result	Refs
2014	British Academy Children's Awards	Pre-School Animation	Bing	Nominated	
2015	Annecy International Animation Film Festival	TV series	For episode "Bye Bye" S1E2	Nominated	
2015	Pulcinella Awards	TV series for PreSchool	Bing	Nominated	
2015	Writers Guild of America Awards	Best Children's TV Episode	Denise Cassar & the Bing Writing Team (for episode "Bye Bye")	Won	
2016	International Emmy Kids Awards	Kids: Pre-School	Bing	Won	
2020	BANFF Rockies World Media Festival	Children & Youth: Pre-School Category	Bing	Nominated	
2020	Palm Springs International Animation Festival	3D Kids Animated Shorts	Bing	Nominated	
2020	PRIX ROYAL Paris Animation Awards	Best Animation (Short)	Bing	Won	
2021	Findecoin - Independent International Short Film Festival	Animated Short Film	Bing	Nominated	
2021	Animation Celebration Fest	Animated TV or Web-series Episode	Bing	Won	
2021	ANIMAFILM International Film Festival	Short Animated Film for Children	Bing	Nominated	
2021	San Diego International Film Festival	Short Film	Bing	Nominated	

== Other media ==
=== Home media ===
DVDs of the series are released by StudioCanal in the UK.

Over 11 volumes, 104/105 episodes of Bing have been released on Region 2 DVDs. The only episode that is not present on home media is Season 2, Episode 27: "Christmas".

The first DVD "Swing...and other episodes" was released on 31 March 2015 and features 10 episodes - "Bye Bye", "Swing", "Blocks", "Ducks", "Smoothie", "Frog", "Car Park", "Shadow", "Musical Statues", and "Voo Voo".

A second DVD was released on 15 June of the same year and is titled "Storytime...and other episodes", featuring a further 10 episodes - "Storytime", "Growing", "Atchoo", "Hide & Seek", "Bake", "Train", "Say Goodbye", "Lost", "Picnic", and "Balloon".

The third DVD titled "Paddling Pool...and other episodes" features 10 episodes: "Paddling Pool", "Dressing Up", "Something for Sula", "Knack", "Hearts", "Giving", "Hula Hoop", "Big Boots", "Bubbles", and "Blankie".

The fourth DVD titled "Fireworks...and other episodes" features 10 episodes: "Fireworks", "Boo", "Talki Taxi", "Kite", "More", "Sparkle Magic", "Tree", "Where's Flop?", "Lunchbox", and "Sleepover".

The fifth DVD titled "Surprise Machine...and other episodes" features 10 episodes: "Surprise Machine", "Dizzy", "House", "Ice Lolly", "Mural", "Hiding", "Sandcastle", "Acorns", "Jingly Shoes", and "Looking After Flop".

The sixth DVD titled "Music...and other episodes" features 10 episodes: "Music", "Hippoty Hoppity Voosh", "Dragon Breath", "Come On Charlie", "Skateboard", "Butterfly", "Chalk Dinosaur", "Potato", "Wellies", and "Ice Cream".

The seventh DVD titled "Cat...and other episodes" features 10 episodes: "Plasters", "Cat", "Dandelion", "Voosh", "Nature Explorer", "Choosing", "Dark", "Stuck", "Cake", and "Here I Go".

The eighth DVD titled "Show...and other episodes" features 8 episodes: "Show", "Not Yours", "Mine", "Lunch", "Woof", "Eggy Head", "Toy Party", and "Mobile Phone".

The ninth DVD titled "Birthday...and other episodes" features 9 episodes: "Birthday", "Face Paint", "Vaccination", "Leaf Pictures", "Fire Engine", "Nicky", "Squiggle", "P.J. Party", and "Hose Pipe".

The tenth DVD titled "Camping...and other episodes" features 9 episodes: "Playhouse", "Names", "Camping", "Bus Ride", "Magnets", "Shop", "Ball", "Accident", and "Puppet Show".

The eleventh DVD titled "Halloween...and other episodes" features 8 episodes: "Halloween", "Charlie Did It", "Helping Hoppity", "Story", "Skippng", "Fossil", "Presents", and "Snow".

A "Best of Bing" DVD features 7 previously released episodes: "Surprise Machine", "Acorns", "Here I Go", "Paddling Pool", "Nature Explorer", "Woof", and "Show".

=== Apps ===
The Bing app, "Bing: Watch, Play, Learn", was first released in September 2014. Available on iOS, Android, and Amazon platforms, the app features full episodes as well as games, audio and activities. Certain features may be restricted due to location and existing distribution rights. The app has been downloaded 2.8 million times since launch.

=== Publishing ===
HarperCollins Children's Books signed a deal with Acamar and The Licensing Company to re-publish the stories to link with the TV programme. The books were re-issued in 2013–14. Approximately 5.2 million Bing books have been sold worldwide with over 70 Bing books published in the UK. HarperCollins and Acamar Films renewed their publishing agreement in 2023.

=== Toys ===
Fisher-Price initially developed a range of Bing toys, which were released in July 2015, including "play sets, figurines, role play items, ride-ons, musical toys, wooden toys, and soft toys". At some point, Fisher-Price lost the license and now toys are currently manufactured by Golden Bear Toys who produce a variety of Bing toys including soft toys as well as plastic play sets.

=== Live events ===
Costume characters of Bing and Flop have been present in CBeebies Land at the Alton Towers theme park since 2018. Specially-decorated Bing rooms were launched in the CBeebies Hotel at Alton Towers in 2022. Bing and Flop costume characters also appear regularly at the Gulliver's Land theme park in Milton Keynes and Rotherham and take part in various limited-time appearances at venues across the UK including Chester Zoo, London Zoo, and Woburn Safari Park. Bing has also appeared at the UK's Gloworm and CarFest summer festivals. In Italy, Bing and Flop form part of the entertainment at the Leolandia theme park since 2019.

An English-language theatre show, Bing Live toured across 50 locations in the UK in 2018. In the Netherlands, a Dutch-language touring theatre show, Bing is jarig (Bing's Birthday) premiered in October 2021 with many performances selling out. A Polish-language version of the show began touring Poland in November 2023.

In November 2022, a limited-time Bing store was opened in the Glasgow Fort shopping centre. The Bing Store Pop-Up sold a range of Bing products while also offering free storytelling sessions, craft activities and meet and greets with the Bing and Flop costume characters.

=== Cinema ===
Acamar Films has produced four Bing cinema packages. The first, Bing at the Cinema debuted across 83 cinemas in the United Kingdom in 2019. In 2023, Bing's Christmas and Other Stories was distributed across 118 UK cinemas. Bing cinema packages have premiered in local languages in UK, the Netherlands, Poland and Italy.
