= Teletubbies say "Eh-oh!" =

1997 children's song

Single by Teletubbies

from the album Teletubbies – The Album
- Released: 1 December 1997
- Length: 3:34
- Label: BBC Worldwide Music
- Songwriters: Andrew McCrorie-Shand, Andrew Davenport
- Producers: Andrew McCrorie-Shand and Steve James

Music video
- "Teletubbies say "Eh-oh!"" on YouTube

"Teletubbies say 'Eh-oh!'" is a single recorded by the Teletubbies. It is a remix of the theme song from the BBC children's television series Teletubbies. The song contains two nursery rhymes: the Teletubbies hum along to "Baa, Baa, Black Sheep" and the flowers from Teletubbyland sing "Mary, Mary, Quite Contrary".

The single reached number one on the UK singles chart for two weeks in December 1997. It remained in the top 100 for a total of 41 weeks and sold well enough to be certified double platinum. It was also a hit in Ireland, peaking at number two. In 1998, a Dutch version titled "Teletubbies zeggen 'A-Oh!'" was released in the Netherlands, where it reached number 12. The Teletubbies have not had another such hit, making them a one-hit wonder.

== Christmas race ==
There was considerable anticipation that it would be the Christmas number one in 1997 and it was the betting favorite at William Hill at odds of 6–4. This race was said to have been decided by the under-10 age group as the rival Spice Girls were popular with seven-year-old girls while the Teletubbies were more popular with younger children. Siobhan Ennis, the singles manager at Tower Records' flagship store in Piccadilly Circus said, "The race for the Christmas No 1 is really exciting. At this time of year, people aren't being so serious about their purchasing. We've taken a hell of a lot of the Teletubbies record. The singles market is driven by children, and not just at Christmas."

The Teletubbies were the Christmas number two, only behind the Spice Girls' "Too Much." But a year later, the BBC was embarrassed when its answer to a pop quiz had the Teletubbies as the Christmas number one.

== Marketing ==
BMG marketed the single in the UK while EMI managed it for the rest of Europe. A&R executive Simon Cowell made this deal with the BBC saying, "I heard another record label were about to sign the Teletubbies, so I got the BBC in my office and told them I would give them £500,000 in advance. We knew a record like that would make over £2 million." It then sold 317,000 copies in its first week to debut at number one; 1,103,000 copies by the end of the year and total UK sales were 1.3 million.

A rival single, "Tubby Anthem", was made by Yorkshire musician Vince Brown for the charity ChildLine. The BBC threatened legal action and so it was withdrawn.

== Reception ==
"Teletubbies say 'Eh-oh!'" was number one on the UK singles chart for two weeks in December 1997. It remained in the Top 75 for 29 weeks after its first release and 3 weeks more after two re-releases. The single was shortlisted for the Novello songwriting award but others consider it to be an annoying tune—sickly and irritating. It has repeatedly placed high in polls of awful songs, such as that run by VH1 in which it placed third to "The Millennium Prayer" and "Mr Blobby". As of February 2020, the song is the 127th biggest-selling-single in UK chart history.

== Charts ==
=== Weekly charts ===
Chart (1997–1999)	Peak position
Europe (Eurochart Hot 100)	10
Ireland (IRMA)	2
Netherlands (Dutch Top 40) "Teletubbies zeggen 'A-Oh!'"	12
Netherlands (Single Top 100) "Teletubbies zeggen 'A-Oh!'"	13
Scottish Singles Sales (Official Charts)	1
UK Singles (Official Charts)	1

=== Year-end charts ===
Chart (1997)	Position
UK Singles (OCC)	5

Chart (1998)	Position
UK Singles (OCC)	94

=== All-time charts ===
Chart (1952–2020)	Position
UK Singles (OCC)	127

== Certifications and sales ==
Region	Certification	Certified units/sales
United Kingdom (BPI)	2× Platinum	1,300,000
