= Golden Bear Toys =

British toy manufacturing company

Golden Bear Products Ltd.
- The logo owned by Golden Bear Toys
- Industry: Toys, Baby & Pre-school products
- Founded: 1979
- Headquarters: London; United Kingdom
- Products: N/A
- Revenue: N/A
- Number of employees: N/A
- Website: http://www.goldenbeartoys.com/

Golden Bear Products Ltd. is a British toy manufacturing company that was formed in 1979 by John Hales and Christine Nicholls. Golden Bear operates from its headquarters in Telford, Shropshire and opened an office in Hong Kong in 2001.

== Products ==
The company has sold a broad range of licensed and branded products including Thomas & Friends, My 1st JCB, Charlie and Lola, Pingu, Noddy, Peppa Pig, Brum, Bob the Builder, Cars, Dora the Explorer, Hana's Helpline, Ben and Holly's Little Kingdom, Sooty and Teletubbies. They also produce new properties, like Bush Baby World.

"My First Thomas & Friends" is a range of chunky plastic toys. The range started in c.1994, and was advertised for young infants who enjoyed the series. The models were safe for younger fans to play with, and included most of the major and minor characters from the TV Series.

The company also acquired the rights to sell the London 2012 Olympic and Paralympic mascots Wenlock and Mandeville. In 2012 the company also launched a range of pre-school vehicles under the brand name Go MINI which was officially licensed by BMW MINI. They also launched a range of Something Special toys featuring the popular BBC character Mr Tumble.

== Current brands and products ==
- Bing related products (2019–present)
- Hey Duggee related products (2015–present)
- In the Night Garden... related products
- JCB related products
- Love Monster related products (2020–present)
- Something Special Related Products
- Sassimals
- Sooty
- Windy Bums
- Twirlywoos related products (2015–present)

== Historic brands and products ==
- Brum related products
- Charlie and Lola related products
- Chuggington related products
- Driver Dan's Story Train related products (2011)
- Pingu related products
- Teletubbies related products
- Thomas & Friends related products (now owned by Mattel)
- Woolly and Tig related products
