= John Simmit =

British actor and stand-up comedian

- Born: Birmingham, England
- Occupations: Actor, stand-up comedian
- Known for: Playing Dipsy in Teletubbies (1997–2001)

John Simmit is a British actor and stand-up comedian. He played the character Dipsy in BBC TV's children's television show Teletubbies from 1997 to 2001.

== Career ==
His many other TV credits include The Real McCoy, The Gadget Show and The Big Fat Quiz of the '90s, whilst live he has performed internationally from Bahrain to Budapest.

As a producer through Upfront Comedy he has put comedy shows into UK theatres nationwide for 25 years, including two major shows in London's west End, in New York & North Carolina. Previewing Upfront's 10th anniversary show, The Guardian noted,

"[T]his anniversary show is yet another excellent standup bill from the most enterprising black comedy promoters in the country. Upfront's first Croydon gig featured Felix Dexter (the first black comic to become a regular performer at Jongleurs and the Comedy Store), plus lapsed Pentecostal choir boy Junior Simpson and Nigerian cockney Gina Yashere. Also on that first bill was the brains behind Upfront, John Simmit […] Thanks to pioneering outfits like Upfront, Britain's black comics are getting some of the mainstream exposure that their talents deserve - and now a growing number of African-American standups are coming here to gig alongside them".

== Filmography ==
- The Real McCoy (1994) - Guest
- Teletubbies (1997–2001) - Dipsy
- Teletubbies Everywhere (2002) - Dipsy
- Today (2007) - guest (as Dipsy and himself)
- The Paul O'Grady Show (2009) - guest (as Dipsy)
- The Big Fat Quiz of the '90s (2012) - Himself
- Respect: A Felix Dexter Special (2013) - Himself
- The Gadget Show (2014) - Himself
