= Teletubbies =

British children's television series

- Created by: Anne Wood; Andrew Davenport
- Written by: Andrew Davenport; Catherine Williams
- Starring: Dave Thompson; Simon Shelton; John Simmit; Nikky Smedley; Pui Fan Lee Jeremiah Krage; Nick Kellington; Rebecca Hyland; Rachelle Beinart
- Narrated by: Tim Whitnall (Note: Toyah Willcox voiced the titles and credits in the original series. Rolf Saxon narrated the American version and Rudolph Walker voiced the titles and credits.); Daniel Rigby (Note: Antonia Thomas voiced the titles and credits in the revival series. Tituss Burgess narrated the American version.)
- Opening theme: "Teletubbies say 'Eh-oh!'"
- Composers: Andrew McCrorie-Shand; Robert Hartley; BBC Philharmonic Richie Webb; Matt Katz
- Country of origin: United Kingdom
- Original language: English
- No. of series: 16
- No. of episodes: 485 (list of episodes)

Production
- Executive producers: Anne Wood; David G. Hillier; Vic Finch Maddy Darrall; Billy Macqueen
- Running time: 25 minutes (original); 15 minutes (revival)
- Production companies: Ragdoll Productions and BBC (original); DHX Media (Note: As DHX Teletubbies Productions Limited), Ingenious, Machame Ltd and Dekatria Productions (revival)

Original release
- Network: BBC Two
- Release: 31 March 1997 – 21 December 2001
- Network: CBeebies
- Release: 9 November 2015 – 12 October 2018

Teletubbies is a British children's television series created by Anne Wood and Andrew Davenport for the BBC. The programme focuses on four differently coloured characters known as the Teletubbies, named after the television screens on their bellies. Recognised throughout popular culture for the uniquely shaped antenna protruding from the head of each character, the Teletubbies communicate mostly through gibberish and were designed to bear resemblance to toddlers.

The series rapidly became a commercial success in Britain and abroad. It won multiple BAFTA awards and was nominated for two Daytime Emmys throughout its run. A single based on the show's theme song reached number 1 in the UK Singles Chart in December 1997 and remained in the Top 75 for 32 weeks, selling over a million copies. By October 2000, the franchise generated over £1 billion ($1.6 billion) in merchandise sales.

Though the original run ended in 2001, a rebooted series was green-lit in 2014. The reboot premiered on CBeebies in the United Kingdom and on the Nick Jr. Channel in the United States. The reboot ran for 120 episodes, with the last episode airing on the Nick Jr. Channel on 17 August 2018. In 2022, a new version of the show premiered on Netflix for American audiences.

== Plot ==
The programme takes place in a grassy, floral landscape populated by rabbits with bird calls audible in the background. The main shelter of the four Teletubbies is an earth house known as the "Tubbytronic Superdome" implanted in the ground and accessed through a hole at the top or an especially large semicircular door at the dome's foot. The Teletubbies co-exist with a number of strange contraptions such as the Voice Trumpets and the group's anthropomorphic blue vacuum cleaner ("Noo-Noo"). The show's colourful psychedelic setting was designed specifically to appeal to the attention spans of infants and unlock different sections of the mind while also educating young children of transitions that can be expected in life.

An assortment of rituals is performed throughout the course of every episode, such as the playful interactions between the Teletubbies and the Voice Trumpets, mishaps caused by the Noo-Noo, the footage of children displayed on the screens on the Teletubbies' stomachs, and the magical event (Note: Either an animal parade marching through Teletubbyland, a magical house with four windows and a singing puppet man inside, a teddy bear tap dancing in a hovering gazebo, a magic tree with five white doves flying onto the branches, three ships sailing on a magical lake, a lion and bear playing hide-and-seek, or Little Bo-Peep trying to find her sheep.) that occurs once per episode. The event differs each time; it is often caused inexplicably and is frequently strange yet whimsical. Each episode is closed by the Voice Trumpets and the narrator. The disappointed, reluctant, but obedient Teletubbies bid farewell to the viewer as they go back to the Tubbytronic Superdome while the Sun Baby sets.

== Characters ==
The main characters. From left to right: Dipsy, Laa-Laa, Po, and Tinky-Winky

=== Main characters ===
- Tinky Winky (portrayed by Dave Thompson and Simon Shelton, and voiced by Mark Heenehan in the original series and played by Jeremiah Krage in the revival series) is the first Teletubby, as well as the largest, oldest and leader of the group. He is covered in purple terrycloth and has a triangular antenna on his head. He often carries a red bag.
- Dipsy (played by John Simmit in the original series and by Nick Kellington in the revival series) is the second Teletubby. He is green and named after his antenna, which resembles a dipstick. Dipsy is the most stubborn of the Teletubbies, and will occasionally refuse to go along with the others' group opinion. His face is notably darker than the rest of the Teletubbies, and the creators have stated that he is of African descent. He often wears a large hat with a black and white pattern.
- Laa-Laa (played by Nikky Smedley in the original series and by Rebecca Hyland in the revival series) is the third Teletubby. She is yellow and has a curly antenna. Laa-Laa is very sweet, likes to sing and dance, and is often shown looking out for the other Teletubbies. Her favourite toy is an orange rubber ball.
- Po (played by Pui Fan Lee in the original series and by Rachelle Beinart in the revival series) is the fourth Teletubby, as well as the shortest and youngest. She is red and has an antenna shaped like a stick used for blowing soap bubbles. Po normally speaks in a soft voice and has been stated by the show's creators to be Cantonese; she sometimes speaks the language. Her favourite toy is a blue and pink scooter.

=== Supporting characters ===
- Noo-Noo (operated by Mark Dean in the original series and Victoria Jane and Olly Taylor in the revival series) is a sentient vacuum cleaner who acts as both the Teletubbies' guardian and housekeeper. He hardly ever ventures outside the Tubbytronic Superdome, instead remaining indoors and constantly cleaning with his sucker-like nose. He communicates through a series of slurping and sucking noises. He occasionally misbehaves and sucks up anything from tubby toast to blankets, which prompts the Teletubbies to call him "Naughty Noo-Noo" and give chase. He was blue in the original series and had orange, pink and yellow stripes in the revival series.
- The Voice Trumpets (voiced by Eric Sykes, Toyah Willcox, John Simmit, Gary Stevenson, Alex Hogg, Alex Pascall, Tim Whitnall and Rudolph Walker in the original series, Sandra Dickinson, Toni Barry, and John Schwab used in the US series from PBS, and Fearne Cotton, Jim Broadbent, Antonia Thomas, Teresa Gallagher, David Walliams and Rochelle Humes in the revival series) are several devices resembling periscopes that rise from the ground and interact with the Teletubbies, often engaging in games with them and serving as supervisors. They are the only residents of Teletubbyland who speak in complete sentences.
- The Sun Baby (played by Jess Smith in the original series and Berry in the revival series) appears at the beginning and the end of each episode. She acts as a wake-up call for the Teletubbies.
- Numerous rabbits are found throughout Teletubbyland, and are depicted by several Flemish Giant rabbits. The Teletubbies enjoy watching them hop and play. The rabbits are the only type of Earth animal found in the land, and take residence in rabbit holes and bushes. They are hardly ever seen in the magical events, apart from the Lion and Bear (edited sketch).
- The Tubby Phone (voiced by Jane Horrocks) is a character in the revival series. Tubby Phone has the ability to make "Tubby Phone dance" and Teletubbies dance after they push the button on the phone. At one point, it has the ability to make Tubby photos.
- The Tiddlytubbies (voiced by Teresa Gallagher) are baby Teletubbies appearing in the revival series. Their names are Mi-Mi, Daa Daa, Baa, Ping, RuRu, Nin, Duggle Dee and Umby Pumby. The Tiddlytubbies would get their own spin-off animated web series in 2018.

== Release ==
On 31 March 1997, the first episode of Teletubbies aired on BBC2 on the CBBC programming block. It filled a time slot previously held by Playdays. This schedule change initially received backlash from parents, but the show was not moved. The programme's unconventional format quickly received attention from the media, and it was attracting two million viewers per episode by August. In February 1998, The Sydney Morning Herald noted that it had "reached cult status" in less than a year on the air.

Teletubbies has been aired in over 120 countries in 45 different languages. In the United States, the series aired on Nickelodeon's sister channel, the Nick Jr. Channel through August 17, 2018. Episodes were also released through the Nick Jr. mobile application and on-demand services. The original series returned to the United States on 25 May 2016, when every episode was added to the Noggin streaming service, including episodes that had never aired in America before. It aired on PBS Kids in the United States from 6 April 1998 to 29 August 2008, after acquiring the show from BBC in 1997. BBC Studios channels carry the series in most of Africa, Asia and Poland. A Spanish dub airs on Clan in Spain. In Greece, the series airs on Nickelodeon Greece. NPO Zappelin carries the show in the Netherlands and MTVA airs it in Hungary. In Australia and New Zealand, the series airs on CBeebies Australia and ABC Kids. In New Zealand alone, the series first aired on 16 March 1998 on TV3 two times a day, in the morning and afternoon slots for children. Bettina Hollings, its director of programming, had spent a day at the filming location in September 1997 and had even owned a set of soft toys of the main characters. JimJam's Benelux feed airs the series and Ultra airs it in Serbia. Teletubbies also airs on SIC in Portugal and e-Junior in the Middle East. In Singapore, the series aired over-the-air on Premiere 12 six days a week, attracting by mid-1998 an audience of 78,000 viewers, and twice a week on cable, on the Eureka Learning Channel. The series also gave a notable subscription drive for Singapore Television Twelve's magazine, owing to Teletubby plush toys sweepstakes.

A redubbed version of the 2015 reboot premiered on Netflix on 14 November 2022 featuring Tituss Burgess as the narrator. Julia Pulo serves as the host of the show's Tummy Tales segments. The series consisted of 26 12-minute episodes.

== Production ==
The show was created by Anne Wood and Andrew Davenport after the BBC requested their pitch for a show aimed at preschoolers. Inspired by Davenport's interest in astronauts, specifically Apollo 11 and the first Moon landing, as well as their concern about "how children were reacting to the increasingly technological environment of the late 1990s", the two put together a pitch which the BBC picked up.

Finding a shooting location was a challenge, as they wanted to film the production outside but were unable to locate a place "with a suitable bowl-like dip". They ended up filming on a farm in Wimpstone, Warwickshire, where they had previously shot Tots TV. Due to problems with a previous television show shooting at the location, the shooting was protested by the locals, although they calmed down after being assured that "it was a low-key children's programme and no one would be aware of the filming". After the show took off, though, its popularity caused the land to be overrun by the press. In 2013, due to the continued trespassing, its owner, Rosemary Harding, had the location filled with water and turned into a small pond: "People were jumping fences and crossing cattle fields. We're glad to see the back of it."

According to Davenport, the press was particularly interested in getting photos of the actors in their Teletubby costumes without their heads on. Eventually, the team took measures to secure their privacy, including blindfolding visitors coming to the set and creating a tent for the actors to change in private.

The artist who originally drew the characters that would become the Teletubbies was the illustrator and caricaturist Jonathan Hills, who also designed digital images for television programmes including Poirot. In 2022 a sample from a collection of original drawings were presented by Hills' widow Lucy on the BBC show Antiques Roadshow. The collection was valued, by expert Mark Hill, at up to £80,000.

== Episodes ==
Season	Era	Episodes	Originally released	
Season	Era	Episodes	First released	Last released
1	Original	118	31 March 1997	31 December 1997
2	Original	126	1 January 1998	31 December 1998
3	Original	56	1 January 1999	17 December 1999
4	Original	30	31 July 2000	22 December 2000
5	Original	35	1 January 2001	16 February 2001
1	Revival	15	9 November 2015	27 November 2015
2	Revival	45	18 January 2016	4 November 2016
3	Revival	40	14 March 2017	20 October 2017
4	Revival	20	4 June 2018	12 October 2018

== Promotion ==
=== Merchandising ===
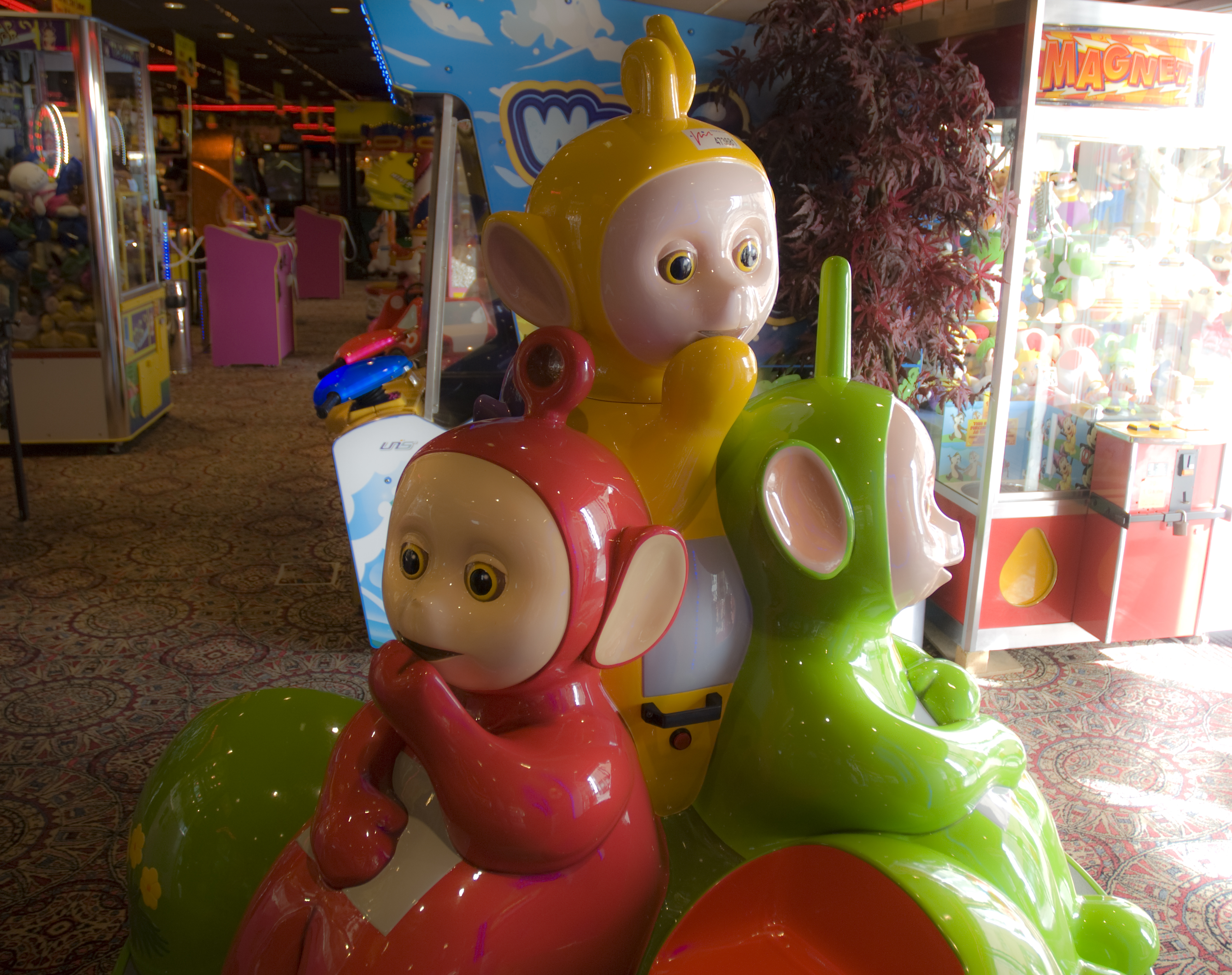
A kiddie ride featuring the Teletubbies characters

Golden Bear Toys distributed the first line of Teletubbies dolls shortly after the programme's debut. They were sold internationally, with talking toys available in multiple languages. Hasbro signed on to develop a new range of products in 1998. In 1999, Microsoft UK released a set of interactive "ActiMates" toys based on the characters. The Rasta Imposta company introduced Teletubbies costumes for children and adults in the same year. Two educational video games featuring the characters were also released throughout the series' run.

Teletubbies dolls were the top-selling Christmas toy in 1997. Demand outstripped supply at most retailers, reportedly prompting many shops to ration them to one per customer. In some cases, shoppers camped outside stores overnight in hopes of purchasing Teletubbies merchandise. Fights over the toys broke out among parents and collectors on occasion. Over one million dolls were sold in Britain by 25 December of that year, with Golden Bear representatives estimating that sales could have reached three million if supplies had been available. The plush toys were named "Toy of the Year" by the British Association of Toy Retailers in 1998.

Kids' meal tie-ins have been released at fast-food restaurants throughout North America. In May 1999, Burger King distributed a set of six Teletubbies plush toys. They also included chicken nuggets shaped like the characters on their menu for a brief period of time. Keychains modelled after the characters were available at McDonald's in April 2000. These promotions became controversial among adults who believed they were intended to attract toddlers to high-fat food. Psychiatrist Alvin Francis Poussaint considered the deals "troubling". He voiced his opinion on the matter publicly, but did not take action against the companies.

Two kiddie rides featuring the characters were manufactured by Jolly Roger. They were available at some amusement parks and arcades, such as Chuck E. Cheese's and Fantasy Island.

Overseas Teletubbies merchandise sales throughout the 1990s delivered €136 million in profits for the BBC. By the time of the programme's cancellation, Teletubbies toys had generated over £200 million in revenue for co-creator Anne Wood alone. In 2005, Chris Hastings and Ben Jones of The Daily Telegraph called Teletubbies "the most lucrative show in BBC television history."

In 2021, WildBrain, who owns the Teletubbies brand, launched a Teletubbies Pride Collection, with merchandise proceeds going towards efforts to expand LGBTQ images and inclusion in children's and family programming.

=== Live events ===
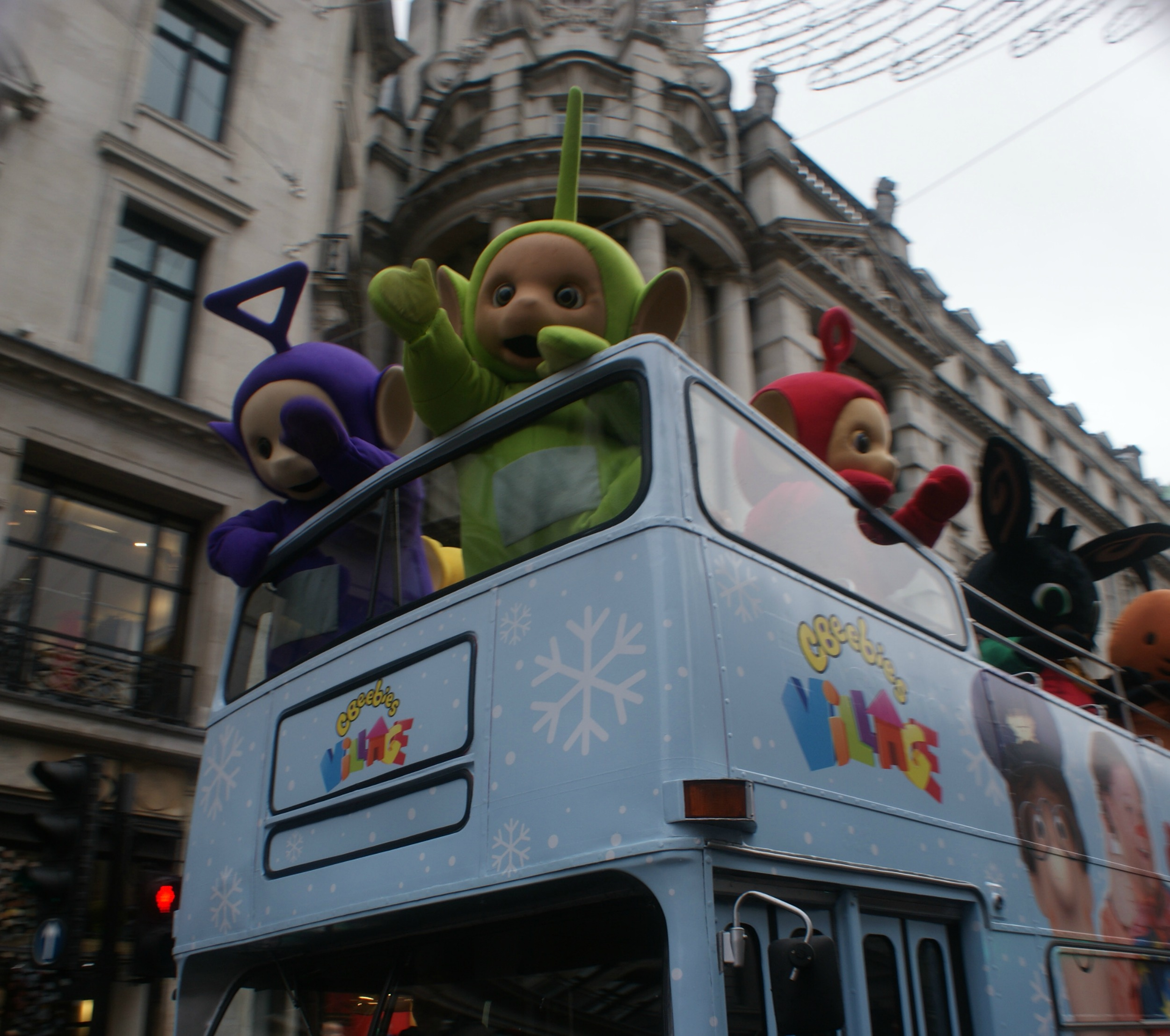
Teletubbies in the Hamley's Toy Parade in 2016

To commemorate the tenth anniversary of the premiere of Teletubbies, a series of events took place from March to April 2007. The characters headlined an invitation-only event in London on 21 March 2007. They appeared in New York City's Times Square, Grand Central Terminal, and Apollo Theater. They were also interviewed on NBC's The Today Show in an episode that included the first televised appearance of the actors without their costumes. A partnership was formed with Isaac Mizrahi in which Mizrahi designed Teletubbies-inspired bags to be auctioned off to benefit charities. A new line of clothing was launched at the Pop-Up Shop and other speciality stores. New York City mayor Mike Bloomberg announced 28 March 2007 "Teletubbies Day" and gave the key to the city to the Teletubbies. Following their show in New York, the Teletubbies went on their first live European tour, performing in London, Paris, Bremen, Darmstadt, Halle, Hamburg, Köln, and Hannover.

In January 2016, costumed Teletubbies characters appeared at the American International Toy Fair. In April 2016, the series' premiere on the Greek Nickelodeon channel was advertised with a series of appearances by the Teletubbies at malls throughout Athens. This began with a live show at Avenue Mall on 16 April, which featured both the Teletubbies and a host from the network. Throughout May 2016, the characters appeared on various breakfast television programmes to promote the upcoming series debut on the Nick Jr. Channel in the United States.

== Reception ==
=== Critical reception ===
Common Sense Media's Emily Ashby found that "while the show's examples of cooperative play, wonder, and simple joys are gentle and pleasing, the creatures can still be a little grating to parents watching along." Caryn James of The New York Times stated in her review that the episodes "offer a genuinely appealing combination: cute and slightly surreal." Writing in Variety, critic Ray Richmond described the show as "plenty surrealistic, all right, and loaded with bizarre Peter Max-style imagery that perfectly matches the Stepford-like quartet of techno trolls" and "a little bit slow for anyone over the age of, say, 30 months," but noted that "It's sweet, it's innocent, it's wholesome."

Upon the show's release, some critics feared that the characters' use of babbling in place of complete sentences would negatively affect young viewers' ability to communicate. The Daily Mirror reported in 1997 that many parents objected to its "goo-goo style" and "said the show was a bad influence on their children." Marina Krcmar, a professor of communication at the Wake Forest University, told interviewers in 2007 that "toddlers learn more from an adult speaker than they do from a program such as Teletubbies." However, Paul McCann of The Independent defended this aspect of the show, stating that "Teletubbies upsets those who automatically assume that progressive and creative learning is trendy nonsense. Those who believe that education should be strictly disciplined and functional, even when you're 18 months old. Thankfully Teletubbies isn't for them. It's for kids."

The programme's magical event that features a cut-out lion chasing a cut-out bear was deemed inappropriate for children by parents for its unsettling tone, cinematography, and music. It was subsequently banned in several countries. A revised version of the sketch was aired several years later with adjusted editing and voice acting.

Although the programme is aimed at children between the ages of one and four, it had a substantial cult following with older generations, mainly university and college students. The mixture of bright colours, unusual designs, repetitive non-verbal dialogue, ritualistic format, and occasional forays into physical comedy appealed to many who perceived the programme as having psychedelic qualities. Shortly after the premiere of the show, at Imperial College London, the campus activities calendar included airtimes and episode highlights.

=== Tinky Winky controversy ===
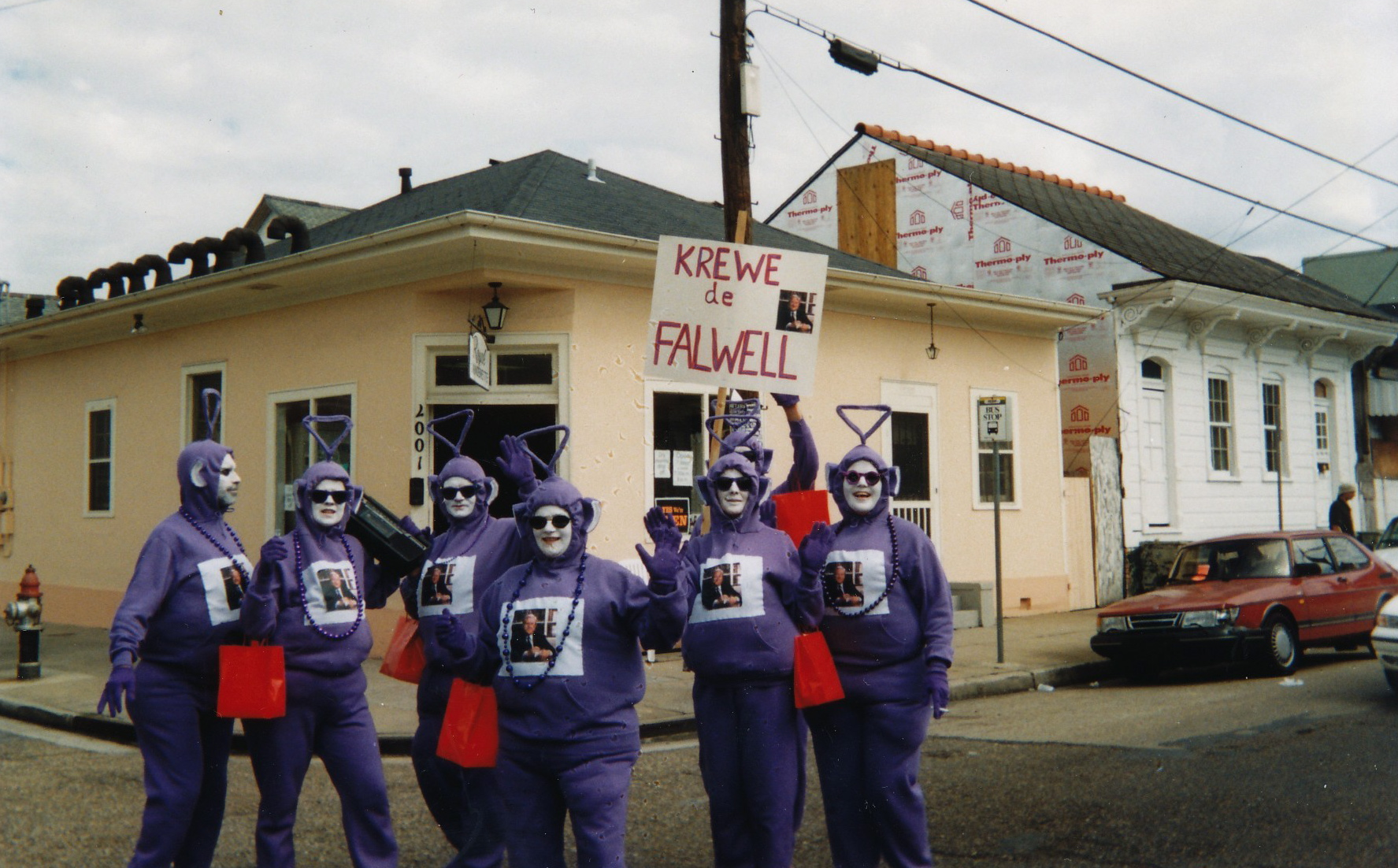
A group of people in Tinky Winky costumes at Mardi Gras, 1999

Controversy arose in 1999 concerning Tinky Winky's sexuality fuelled by him carrying a bag that looks much like a woman's handbag (although he was first "outed" by the academic and cultural critic Andy Medhurst in a letter from July 1997 to The Face). He aroused the interest of Jerry Falwell in 1999 when Falwell alleged that the character was a "gay role model". Falwell issued an attack in his National Liberty Journal, citing a Washington Post "In/out" column which stated that lesbian comedian Ellen DeGeneres was "out" as the chief national gay representative, while trendy Tinky Winky was "in". He warned parents that Tinky Winky could be a covert homosexual symbol, because "he is purple, the gay pride colour, and his antenna is shaped like a triangle: the gay pride symbol." The BBC made an official response, explaining that "Tinky Winky is simply a sweet, technological baby with a magic bag." Kenn Viselman of Itsy-Bitsy Entertainment commented, "He's not gay. He's not straight. He's just a character in a children's series."

In May 2007, Polish Ombudsman for Children Ewa Sowińska revisited the matter, and planned to order an investigation. "I noticed that he has a woman's handbag, but I didn't realise he's a boy", Sowińska said in a public statement. She asked her office's psychologists to look into the allegations. After the research in late 2007, she stated: "The opinion of a leading sexologist, who maintains that this series has no negative effects on a child's psychology, is perfectly credible. As a result, I have decided that it is no longer necessary to seek the opinion of other psychologists."

Despite the objections, the Independent on Sunday's editors included Tinky Winky as the only fictional character in the 2008 inaugural "Happy List", alongside 99 real-life adults recognised for making Britain a better and happier place.

In response to this controversy, the gay community embraced the Teletubbies, with Tinky Winky leading pride parades and being featured on restaurant menus with themed items. In 2021, WildBrain, owner of the Teletubbies brand, declared their support for the LGBTQ+ community with the statement "Teletubbies Love Pride." The company released a limited collection of merchandise with proceeds supporting GLAAD. In a statement, WildBrain said, "The Teletubbies have always embraced their own offbeat quirkiness and sense of style. This Pride Month, we're celebrating that 'love who you are' spirit through our Collection of ready-to-rave fashion that makes Tinky Winky, Dipsy, Laa-Laa and Po very proud." This was followed up by a 30-piece gender-fluid adult fashion collection commemorating Pride 2022.

=== Awards and nominations ===
Year	Presenter	Award/Category	Nominee	Status	Ref.
1997	City of Birmingham Awards	Best Midlands-Produced Children's Television Production	Ragdoll Productions	Won	
1997	NHK Japan Prize	Grand Prize (Pre-School Education)	Ragdoll Productions	Won	
1997	Royal Television Society	Children's Entertainment Award	Ragdoll Productions	Won	
1998	British Academy of Film and Television Arts	Best Pre-School Programme	Ragdoll Productions	Won	
1998	Marketing Society Awards	New Product of the Year	Golden Bear Toys		
1998	Online Film & Television Association	Best Children's Series	Ragdoll Productions	Nominated	
1998	Television Critics Association	Outstanding Achievement in Children's Programming	Ragdoll Productions	Nominated	
1998	UK Independent Television Productions Awards	NATS Children's Award	Ragdoll Productions	Won	
1999	Daytime Emmy Awards	Outstanding Pre-School Children's Series	Ragdoll Productions	Nominated	
1999	Licensing Industry Merchandiser's Association	Overall License of the Year	Ragdoll Productions	Won	
1999	Independent Television Productions Awards	Nickelodeon UK Children's Award	Ragdoll Productions	Won	
1999	Television Critics Association	Outstanding Achievement in Children's Programming	Ragdoll Productions	Nominated	
2000	Independent Television Productions Awards	Audiocall Indie Children's Award	Ragdoll Productions	Won	
2000	Daytime Emmy Awards	Outstanding Pre-School Children's Series	Ragdoll Productions	Nominated	
2000	Royal Television Society	Education Award	Ragdoll Productions	Won	
2000	British Academy of Film and Television Arts	Outstanding Contribution in Children's Television and Film	Anne Wood	Won	
2002	British Academy of Film and Television Arts	Best Pre-School Live Action Series	Ragdoll Productions	Won	
2014	Prix Jeunesse	"Most Edgy" Programme of the Last 50 Years	Ragdoll Productions	Won	
2014	Prix Jeunesse	Greatest Impact Programme of the Last 50 Years	Ragdoll Productions	Won	

== Other media ==
=== In popular culture ===
- In 2012, during both the second and third series of TVN's Saturday Night Live Korea, the programme was referenced as Yeouido Teletubbies (여의도 텔레토비) to portray the 2012 presidential election campaign. This experimental skit caused the popularity of SNL Korea's "Crew", Kim Seul-gi and Kim Min-kyo, who acted major candidates respectably, to skyrocket.
- A parody of the series was featured in the 2013 Regular Show episode "Sleep Fighter".
- On 28 May 2022, to promote the franchise's 25th anniversary, the Teletubbies made an appearance on Britain's Got Talent in the London Palladium, where they "auditioned" by performing covered songs from their "Ready, Steady, Go!" album, as well as other songs such as Beyoncé's "Single Ladies" and One Direction's "Best Song Ever". At the end of the performance, they gave Simon Cowell, who helped them release their song that got to number 1, a big hug onstage.
- In 2024, the Teletubbies guest starred on season 9 of RuPaul's Drag Race All Stars. In the mini challenge of episode 5, each of the contestants danced with one of the Teletubbies in a Soul Train-themed dance off. The Teletubbies attend other events sponsored by the producers of RuPaul's Drag Race, including DragCon UK and DragCon LA.
- The opening scene in 2025's 28 Years Later features a group of kids watching Teletubbies on the same day as the beginning of the Rage Virus outbreak. A hard rock cover of the show's theme song is also played later in the film. They are also mentioned in the sequel, 28 Years Later: The Bone Temple, as an inspiration for the Fingers, a cult started by Jimmy Crystal, who was one of the children watching the Teletubbies in the original film. One of the Fingers also does Dipsy's dance during a crucial scene.

=== CD single ===
In December 1997, BBC Studios released a CD single from the series, based on the show's theme song, called "Teletubbies say 'Eh-oh!'" It is the only single from Teletubbies, making the characters a one-hit wonder in the United Kingdom. The song was written by Andrew McCrorie-Shand and Andrew Davenport, and produced by McCrorie-Shand and Steve James. The single reached number 1 in the UK Singles Chart in December 1997, and remained in the Top 75 for 32 weeks after its release.

=== Games ===
In 1998, BBC Multimedia released Play with the Teletubbies for Microsoft Windows. It was later ported to the PlayStation in 2000, and was later released in the United States by Knowledge Adventure. In 1999, Knowledge Adventure released Teletubbies 2: Favorite Games for Microsoft Windows.

In December 2017, Teletubbies Play Time was released worldwide for mobile devices by Built Games.

== Spinoffs ==
=== Teletubbies Everywhere ===
Teletubbies Everywhere is a spin-off (aka segment in the United States) of Teletubbies that aired on CBeebies on 11 February 2002. In the United States, the segment premiered on 20 January 2003 on PBS Kids, usually replacing the original first half of the Teletubbies episodes.

Teletubbies Everywhere have 10-minute episodes that teach about colours, shapes, numbers, simple concepts such as up and down or big and small, and culture.

Teletubbies Everywhere does not take place in Teletubbyland. Instead, it takes place in a variety of coloured backgrounds that change between segments. Each episode follows the same format which includes 4–5 segments (between the intro and ending).

=== Tiddlytubbies animated web series ===
In 2018, a spin-off animated web series featuring the Tiddlytubbies characters debuted on the official Teletubbies YouTube channel. These shorts are animated by WildBrain Spark Studios, a subsidiary of WildBrain that produces content for the WildBrain Spark network.

=== Teletubbies: Ready, Steady, Go! ===
A CGI-animated music-focused spin-off titled Teletubbies: Ready, Steady, Go!, produced by WildBrain Spark Studios, premiered in September 2021 and was eventually pre-sold overseas.

The series tied into an album that was released digitally and on CD on 15 October 2021, and was made to prepare for the franchise's 25th anniversary. Universal Music Canada and Virgin Music Label & Artist Services handled global distribution rights to the album.

=== Teletubbies: Let's Go! ===
A CGI-animated spin-off called Teletubbies: Let's Go! was announced by WildBrain on 15 September 2022. and premiered in October of that year on the show's YouTube channel. As with the other online spin-offs, it was produced by WildBrain Spark Studios, and consists of 52 five-minute shorts.

The spin-off was also pre-sold internationally, with ITV obtaining UK broadcast rights.
