= Peggy Bennette Hume =

British playwright and children's author

Peggy Bennette Hume is a British playwright and children's author.

== Life ==
Peggy Bennette Hume was born in London to Trinidadian parents.

Bennette Hume's play The Girl Who Wished was performed at the Tricycle Theatre in 1985. In 1986 she was appointed the first writer in residence at the Battersea Arts Centre, making her the only black woman writer in residence in London.

== Works ==
=== Play productions ===
- No Hard Feelings. Roots Theatre Company, 1985.
- The Girl Who Wished. Tricycle Theatre, 1985.
- This Way Up. Bemarrow Sisters Theatre Company, 1986.

=== Publications ===
- The Girl Who Wished. New Millenium, 1997.
- Plaiting: for all little girls who have ever suffered with 'bed hairs' and 'sombrero hairs' . United Kingdom : The Choir Press, 2014. Parallel English text and Swedish translation. With illustrations by Gemma Adams, music composed by John Hare.
