= Curtis Walker (actor) =

British actor

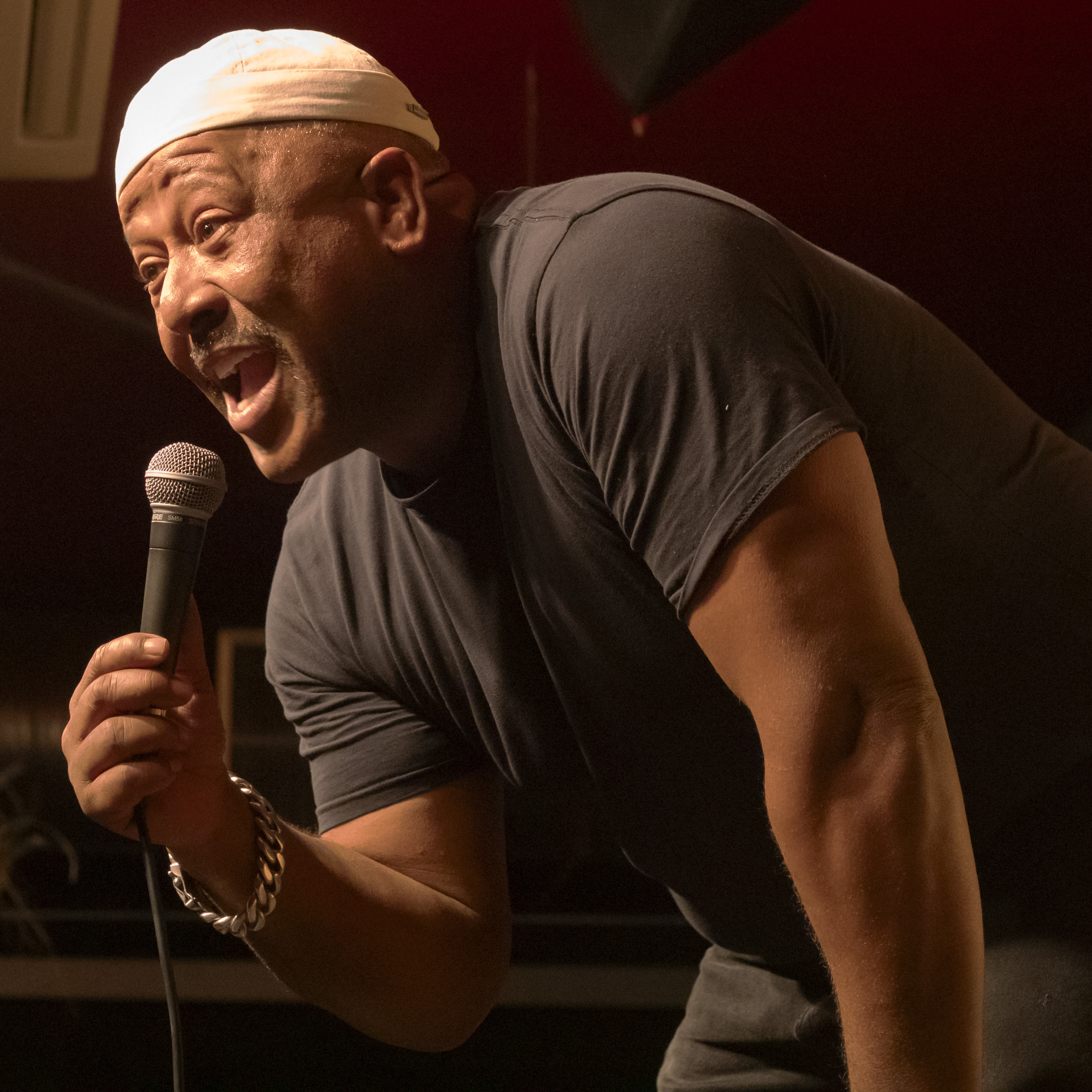
- Walker doing standup comedy in 2023
- Born: 26 July 1961 (age 65); London, England
- Occupations: Actor, comedian, writer
- Known for: The Real McCoy

Curtis Walker is a British actor, writer and stand-up comedian. He starred in BBC comedy shows Paramount City, CBBC sitcom Kerching!, The Real McCoy and Blouse and Skirt. Walker was the pre-show warm up act for the London 2012 Olympic Opening Ceremony.
