= Eddie Nestor =

British actor, stand up comedian, television and radio presenter

Eddie Nestor MBE
- Born: 5 June 1964 (age 62); Hackney, London, England

Edward Augustus Matthew Christopher Nestor MBE (born 5 June 1964) is a British actor, stand up comedian, television and radio presenter, who is best known for his starring roles in The Real McCoy and Desmond's, as well as playing a small role in Trainspotting. Nestor has a radio programme in which he has a running joke with his claim to be about to turn thirty years old.

== Acting career ==
Nestor appeared on BBC One's Canterbury Tales and is a former star on Casualty.

In 2016, he appeared as Freddie Hamilton in the BBC drama series, Death in Paradise.

== Broadcasting career ==
As of 2020, Nestor presented the Drive Time show for BBC Radio London, moving to the mid-morning slot on the station on 13 September 2021, presenting the programme on four days each week.

Nestor previously presented a show on BBC London on Friday evenings, from 10 pm to 2 am, that he called The Rum Shop.

He was voted "The Speech Broadcaster of the Year" at the Sony Radio Academy Awards 2007.

== Personal life ==
Although raised in Hackney, London, Nestor is a supporter of Manchester United, and presents a podcast by Manchester United, The Manchester United Red Cast, with Robert Meakin.

In February 2007, Nestor was diagnosed as having Hodgkin's Lymphoma, and kept a blog of his treatment and reactions. He is currently in remission. In December 2017, Nestor was appointed an MBE in the Queen's New Year's Honours List for 2018 for his charity work and services to radio.

He hosted, alongside Robbie Gee, the Imperial College Indian Society's annual "East Meets West" charity show in 2007 and 2008. The show, in both years, was one of the most successful and popular charity shows in the United Kingdom, drawing more than 1,750 people to the prestigious London Palladium in 2008.

In July 2026, Radio London presenter Eddie Nestor has announced he will be stepping away from his role after being diagnosed with cancer. In Aug, Eddie returned to the radio station
