= Hackney Empire =

Theatre in London

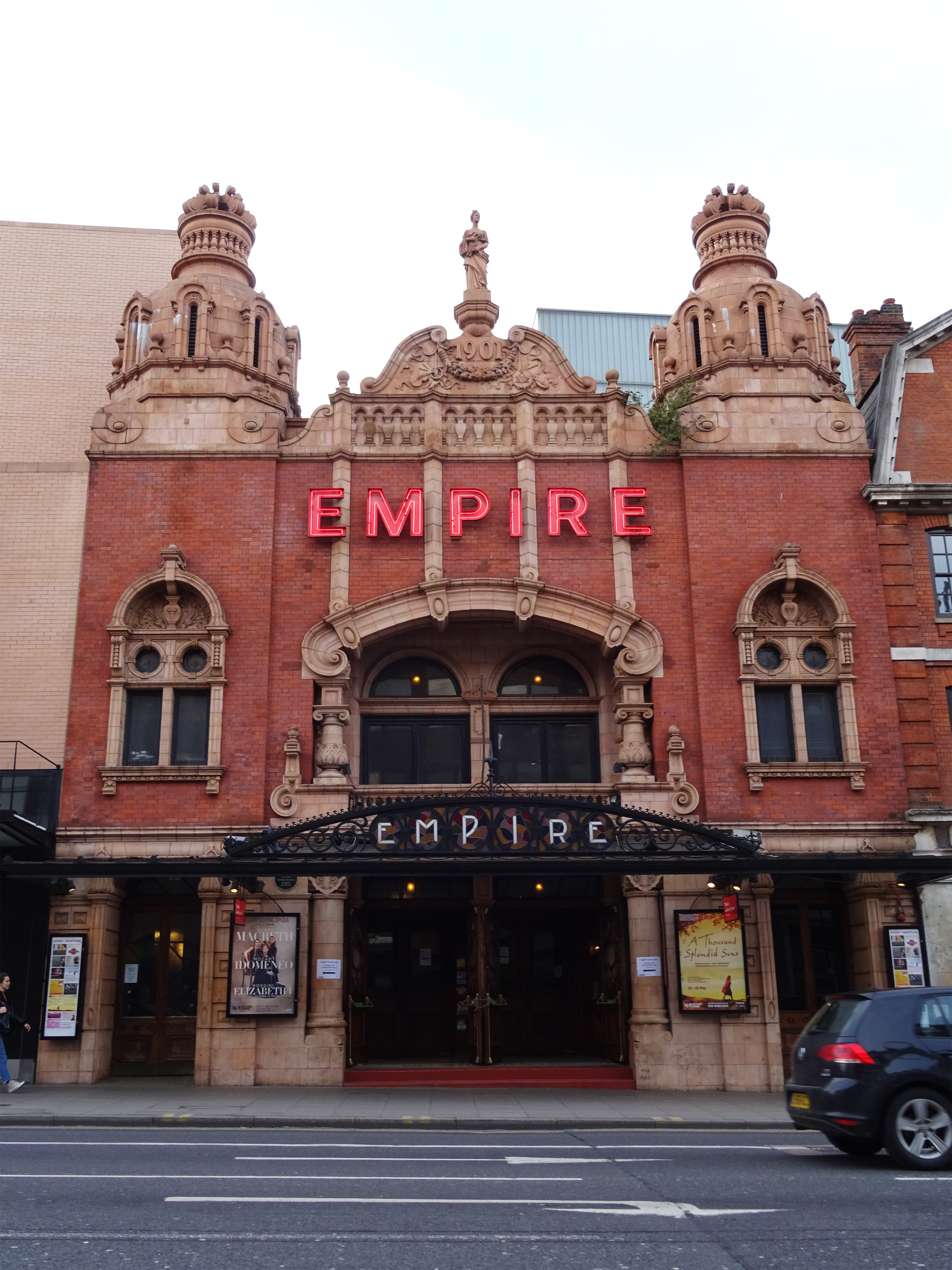
- Hackney Empire in 2019
- Interactive map of Hackney Empire
- Location: Mare Street Hackney Central; London, E8; United Kingdom
- Coordinates: 51.5455°N 0.0555°W
- Owner: Hackney Empire Trust
- Capacity: 1,275
- Type: Former music hall
- Designation: Grade II*
- Production: Visiting productions
- Public transit: Hackney Central

Construction
- Opened: 9 December 1901; 124 years ago
- Closed: 1956–1962 television studio 1963–1986 bingo hall
- Rebuilt: 2004 (Tim Ronalds Architects)

Listed Building – Grade II*
- Official name: The Hackney Empire
- Designated: 28 June 1972
- Reference no.: 1226960
- Architect: Frank Matcham

Website
- hackneyempire.co.uk

Hackney Empire is a theatre on Mare Street, in Hackney in the London Borough of Hackney. Originally designed by Frank Matcham it was built in 1901 as a music hall, and expanded in 2001. Described by The Guardian as "the most beautiful theatre in London" it is an Arts Council England National Portfolio Organisation. In 2021, pop singer Leona Lewis became the patron of the Empire.

The architectural writer Nikolaus Pevsner described the Hackney Empire as "among the best-surviving Edwardian suburban variety theatres". Samantha Ellis in The Guardian writes, "From Chaplin to Gracie, the Hackney Empire played host to the greatest stars of music hall".

== History ==
Hackney Empire is a grade II* listed building. The theatre was built as a music hall in 1901, designed by the architect Frank Matcham. Architecture scholar Nicholas Pevsner described the "splendid Hackney Empire, with its ornate terracotta exterior and sumptuous seventy-seven galleried auditorium" as a key example of Victorian and Edwardian architecture. There is a statue of Thalia, the Greek muse of comedy, on the roof of the theatre: this was removed in 1979, but later reinstalled.

Charlie Chaplin, Gracie Fields, Stanley Holloway, Stan Laurel, Marie Lloyd and Julie Andrews all performed there, when the Hackney Empire was a music hall.

ATV bought the theatre to use as studios in the mid-1950s and shows such as Take Your Pick and Oh, Boy! were broadcast live. Certain episodes of Opportunity Knocks were also filmed at the theatre. Some scenes from Emergency – Ward 10 were also filmed there. From 1963 to 1984, the theatre was used by the Mecca Organisation as a bingo hall; wrestling matches also occurred there during the 1960s.

In 1984, Mecca found the building too expensive to maintain as a bingo hall, and it was offered to Cartoon Archetypical Slogan Theatre (CAST), a satirical touring theatre group, headed by Claire and Roland Muldoon, as a London base. They also mounted successful variety nights headlined by a new breed of alternative comedy acts, such as Ben Elton, Dawn French, and Jennifer Saunders.

The theatre was threatened with demolition, and in 1986, actor-manager Roland Muldoon mounted a campaign to acquire the freehold and to re-open the Hackney Empire as a permanent performance space; allowing the theatre to return to theatrical use for its 85th anniversary.

Ralph Fiennes played Hamlet to Francesca Annis' Gertrude in Jonathan Kent's Almeida Theatre Company production of Hamlet, 28 February – 30 March 1995. In 1996, mime/choreographer Lindsay Kemp premiered Variété', his first British production in over 20 years, there and Slava's Snowshow, featuring the famous Russian clown Slava Polunin, played the theatre several times.

== Stand-up comedy ==
Hackney Empire was a leading centre in the alternative comedy boom of the 1980s, and remains a venue for comedy. Comedians who have performed at the venue include Frankie Boyle, Jo Brand, Russell Brand, John Cleese, Jackie Clune, Greg Davies, Felix Dexter, Ben Elton, Harry Enfield, Craig Ferguson, Dawn French, Jeremy Hardy, Lily Savage, Lenny Henry, Bill Hicks, Harry Hill, Mark Linn-Baker, Paul Merton, Jennifer Saunders, Arthur Smith, Tim Vine, Tommy Cockles, Hattie Hayridge, Mark Steel, Jack Whitehall, Josh Widdicombe, and Michael C. Burgess.

== Modern times ==
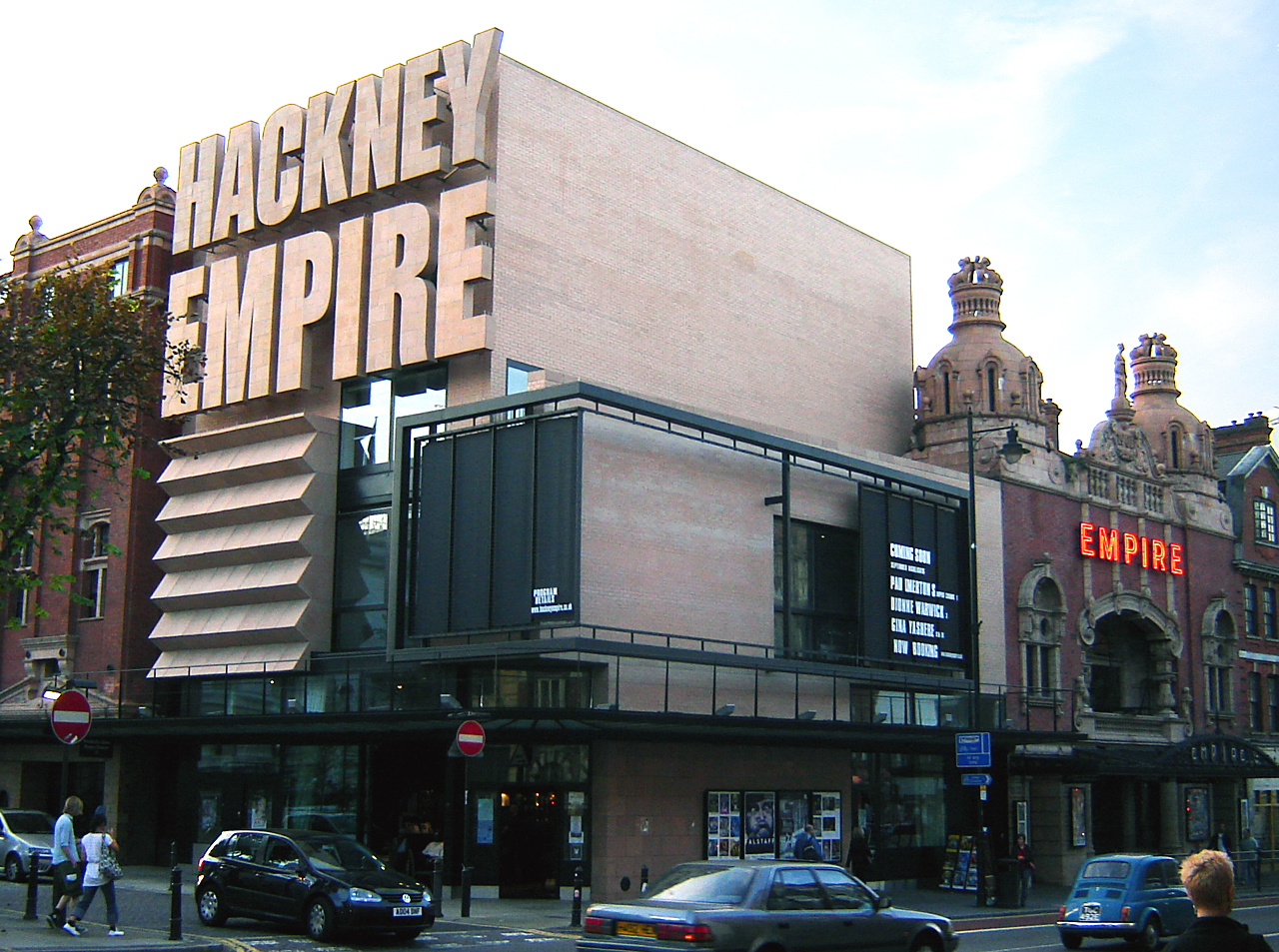
The refurbished Hackney Empire built in 1901, retains the original structure, but adds modern facilities (September 2005)

Hackney Empire's artistic programme includes: theatre, opera, comedy, dance and music. Hackney Empire collaborate and partner with regional and international companies and artists including the Royal Shakespeare Company, English Touring Opera, Scottish Opera and the BBC Concert Orchestra.

In 2001, the Empire closed for a £17m refurbishment project designed by Tim Ronalds Architects with Carr and Angier acting as theatre consultants. It was reopened in 2004. The restoration included the addition of a 60-seat orchestra pit to make the Empire suitable for opera performances by companies such as English Touring Opera, the addition of a flytower with provision for counterweight flying and a reduction of the stage rake from 1 in 24 to 1 in 30. Among other new facilities were a studio theatre and educational and hospitality facilities, and greatly improved dressing rooms.

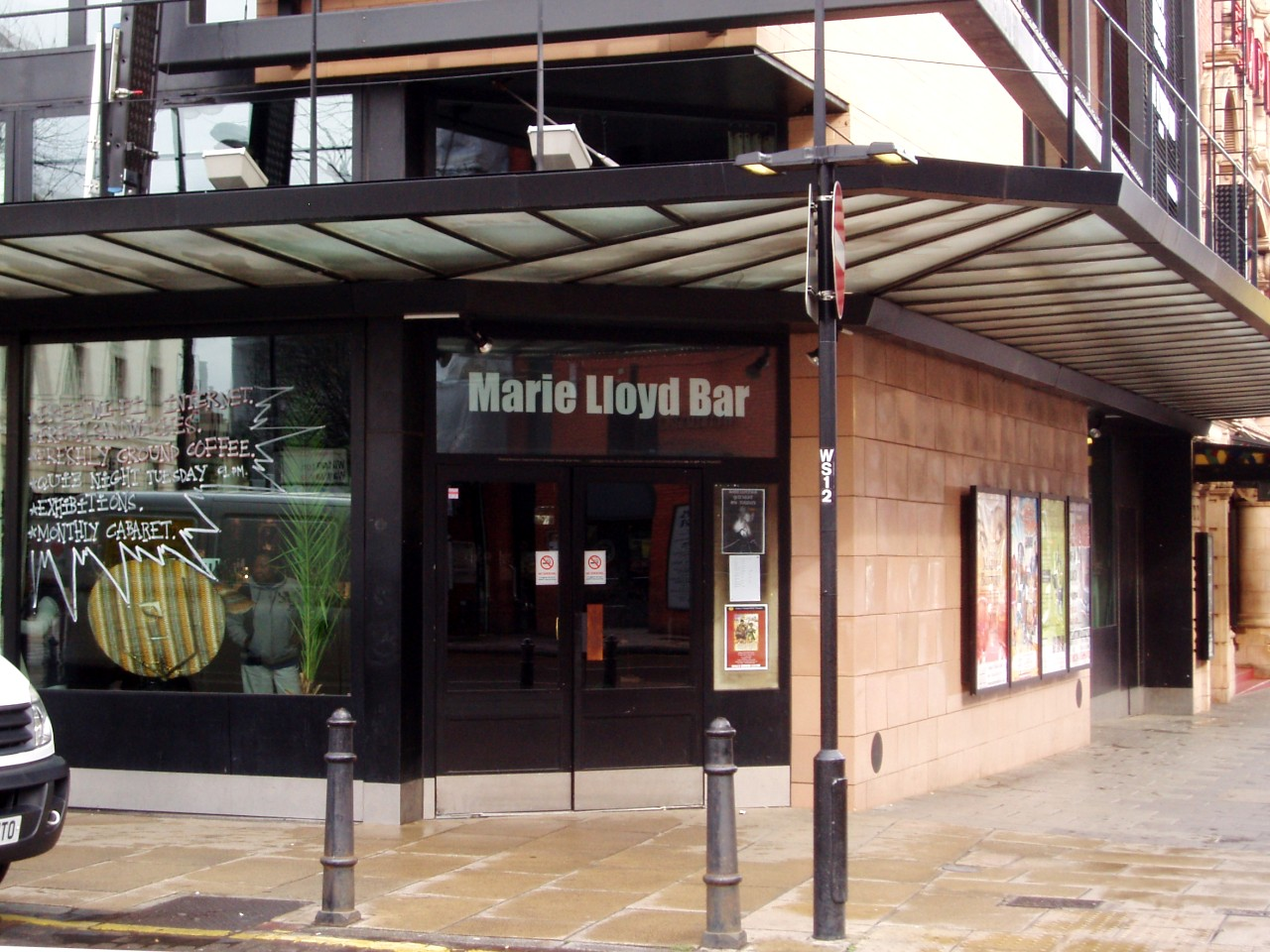
The Marie Lloyd bar

Additionally, the Marie Lloyd public house was incorporated into the new extension. In addition to Muldoon, the comedian Griff Rhys Jones led the restoration appeal, with a large donation coming from local businessman Alan Sugar. The theatre received another grant of £400,000 from Arts Council England in 2019 to make building improvements and increase community outreach.

The John Bishop Show was presented and recorded at the Hackney Empire and aired on BBC One from 30 May 2015 to 18 July 2015. Since 2014, the British Soap Awards have also been filmed at the Hackney Empire.

It has produced pantomimes since 1988, providing free tickets to local Housing Associations, Community Groups, local refuges and young carers. Alongside its main-stage programme, Hackney Empire provides performing arts activities for local young people. As of 2022 its Creative Futures programme works with over 4,000 young people annually, aged 14–25, and runs a community choir that includes over 80 regular members.

On 6 September 2023, the theatre hosted a news conference to announce a new album by The Rolling Stones, Hackney Diamonds. Jimmy Fallon interviewed the three remaining stars of the group.

== Transport ==
The nearest station is Hackney Central on London Overground Mildmay line.

== Patrons ==
- Harold Pinter (died 2008)
- Griff Rhys Jones
- Lord Alan Sugar
- Clive Rowe
- Leona Lewis
