= Felix Dexter =

British actor and comedian (1961–2013)

- Born: 26 July 1961; Saint Christopher-Nevis-Anguilla
- Died: 18 October 2013 (aged 52); London, England
- Education: University College London
- Occupations: Actor, comedian, writer
- Known for: The Real McCoy

Felix Dexter (26 July 1961 – 18 October 2013) was a Saint Kitts-born British actor, comedian and writer.

== Early life ==
Dexter was born on 26 July 1961 in Saint Kitts, at the time a colony of the United Kingdom, in the Caribbean. At the age of seven, he moved with his family to Surrey, England. He studied law at University College London and began training as a barrister, before embarking on a career in comedy. He started by touring late-night comedy venues, including Jongleurs club in London and The Comedy Store, before being hired to work with a Black and Asian cast in the 1990s BBC TV sketch show The Real McCoy, which was initially based on a stage show that Dexter performed at the Hackney Empire Theatre.

== Career ==
=== Television ===
After The Real McCoy, a pilot sketch show Felix Dexter On TV was broadcast in September 1995 as part of the Comic Asides series. He wrote and starred in the sitcom pilot Douglas, broadcast in 1996. Neither pilot was picked up for series, despite positive reception.

Dexter appeared on Have I Got News for You in 1996 and went on to become one of the regular performers on the later series of The Fast Show. He also appeared in Citizen Khan, which first aired in 2012, as Omar, a Somali Muslim who works at a mosque in Sparkhill, Birmingham. The second series of the show aired in October 2013. He also starred in Absolutely Fabulous as John, the father of Saffron's baby.

Dexter had voiced Francis in Crapston Villas, an adult animated sitcom soap opera that was produced in the 1990s.

=== Radio ===
On BBC Radio 4, he featured in the satirical spoof radio phone-in show Down the Line, The Simon Day Show, Sean Lock's 15 Storeys High, and starred in the dramatisation of Delete This at Your Peril, part of The Bob Servant Emails, written by Neil Forsyth.

== Death ==
Dexter died on 18 October 2013, aged 52. He had been suffering from multiple myeloma.

On 17 November 2013, BBC Two television broadcast a 30-minute retrospective programme called Respect: A Felix Dexter Special, featuring tributes from friends and colleagues. His fellow cast members from BBC Radio 4's Down the Line broadcast a special edition titled A Tribute to Felix Dexter on 23 December 2013.

== Legacy ==
In 2014, Dexter was posthumously given Screen Nation's Edric Connor Inspiration Award.
