= Krage =

Krage is a surname. Notable people with the surname include:

- Constantin Krage (1900–1984), Danish architect
- Jeremiah Krage (born 1974), British actor
- Nikolaus Krage (1500–1559), German theologian
