= Denise Robertson =

British writer and broadcaster (1932–2016)

Denise Robertson MBE, DL
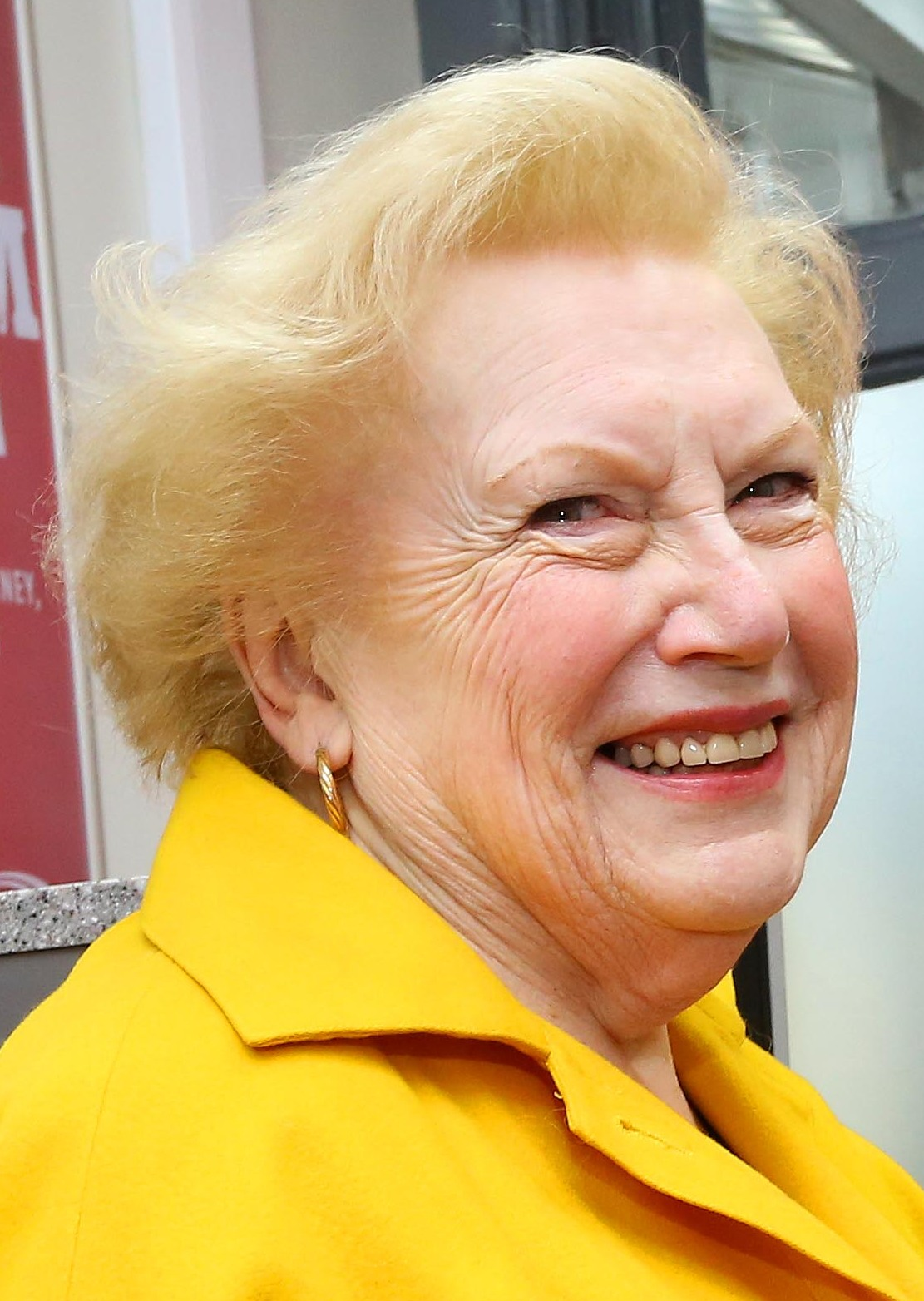
- Robertson at Durham railway station in November 2015
- Born: Margaret Denise Mary Broderick; 9 June 1932; Sunderland, County Durham, England
- Died: 31 March 2016 (aged 83); London, England
- Resting place: Sunderland Cemetery
- Occupations: Writer, television broadcaster, agony aunt
- Years active: 1985–2016
- Employer: ITV
- Known for: Agony aunt role on This Morning
- Spouse(s): Alex Robertson (m. 1960; died 1972) Jack Tomlin (m. 1973; died 1995) Bryan Thubron (m. 1997–2016)
- Children: 1

Denise Robertson MBE DL (9 June 1932 – 31 March 2016) was a British writer and television broadcaster. She made her television debut as the presenter of the Junior Advice Line segment of the BBC's Breakfast Time programme in 1985, though she is best known as the resident agony aunt on the ITV show This Morning from its first broadcast on 3 October 1988 until her death. In the course of her career, she dealt with over 200,000 letters from viewers seeking advice. In 2006 she was appointed as a Member of the Order of the British Empire for services to broadcasting.

== Early life ==
Born Margaret Denise Mary Broderick on 9 June 1932 in Sunderland, County Durham, she was the youngest of two daughters of Herbert Stanley (1889–1961) and Catherine Maud Broderick (née Cahill, 1896–1970). Herbert ran a shipping business that failed before she was born. She attended Sunderland High School.

== Career ==
Robertson's first job was as a clerk at Sunderland Royal Infirmary. She then progressed to the position of medical secretary, and later became a counsellor. She won a BBC competition to write a play, and became an agony aunt on Metro Radio in Newcastle.

From its 1988 inception until shortly before her death in 2016, Robertson was a familiar face on ITV's flagship daytime magazine programme This Morning, appearing as its resident agony aunt. Over her 27 years on the show, Robertson dealt with an estimated 200,000 letters from viewers wanting advice.

In addition to This Morning, Robertson briefly hosted her own television series, Dear Denise, in 2000. She also featured as a love and relationships pundit on Dave Gorman's Important Astrology Experiment in 2002. Robertson ran an advice website called DearDenise.com, and wrote a monthly column for national magazine Candis. She also made regular appearances on Channel 5's Big Brother's Bit on the Side.

Robertson was a regular panellist on BBC Radio 4's political debate programme Any Questions? She also served as an independent councillor for her local council and drove for the Meals on Wheels service. She was also chair of her local physically handicapped club for over ten years. In 1983, she formed a trust with five others to provide work for the long-term unemployed.

In addition, Robertson wrote fiction and non-fiction books. Her first novel, Nurse in Doubt (1984), was published by Mills & Boon. Her second, The Land of Lost Content, was awarded the 1984 Constable Prize for fiction.

== Personal life ==
Robertson was twice widowed; she married Alexander Inkster "Alex" Robertson (1919–1972) in 1960 and they had a son Mark Alexander (born 1962). Alexander Robertson died of lung cancer in 1972. In 1973, she married John "Jack" Tomlin (1921–1995); he died of a stroke in 1995.

She then married her childhood friend Bryan Thubron in 1997. Robertson was a keen supporter of Sunderland A.F.C. and had worked with the University of Sunderland, appearing as guest speaker at graduation ceremonies. She lived in East Boldon, South Tyneside.

== Honours ==
In 1998, Robertson was appointed a Deputy Lieutenant of County Durham. She was given the Freedom of the City of Sunderland in 2006 and appointed a Member of the Order of the British Empire (MBE) in the Birthday Honours that year for "services to Broadcasting and to Charity".

== Death ==
Robertson died on 31 March 2016, aged 83, at the Royal Marsden Hospital, London after being diagnosed in early 2016 with pancreatic cancer. She made the diagnosis public in February 2016 on the television show This Morning after being absent from her usual posting as its agony aunt. This Morning aired a special edition tribute programme on 1 April 2016. Her funeral took place on 13 April 2016 at Sunderland Minster, and she was buried in Sunderland Cemetery in Grangetown.

== Filmography ==
| Year | Title | Production company | Role | Notes |
|---|---|---|---|---|
| 1985–86 | Breakfast Time | BBC | Presenter | Junior Advice Line segment |
| 1988–2016 | This Morning | Granada Television/ITV Studios | Agony aunt | Until her death |
| 1993 | Robson's People | Tyne Tees Television | Episode 1.12 | Interviewee |
| 1993–94 | Close to the Edge | Granada Television | Presenter | All 11 episodes |
| 1996 | A Spark of Joy | BBC | Contributor | Documentary on Catherine Cookson |
| 1998 | Modern Times | BBC | Contributor | Episode 7.3 'Agony Aunts' |
| 2000 | Dear Denise | Granada Television for ITV | Presenter/expert | |
| 2002 | Loose Women | ITV Studios | Panellist | Episode 3.04, 3.16 |
| 2002 | Dave Gorman's Important Astrology Experiment | BBC | Contributor | All 6 episodes |
| 2003 | The Weakest Link | BBC | Contestant | Episode 9 August 2003 |
| 2003 | Little Friends | Planet 24 for Channel 4 | Guest appearance | |
| 2003 | My Favourite Hymns | Granada Television | Subject | Episode 2 November 2003 and episode 16 November 2003 |
| 2004 | The Impressionable Jon Culshaw | ITV | Guest appearance | Episode 1.6 |
| 2005 | The Paul O'Grady Show | Granada Television for ITV | Interviewee | Episode 2.48 |
| 2011, 2012 | Loose Women | ITV Studios | Guest | Episode 15.133, 16.097 |
| 2011–2016 | Big Brother's Bit on the Side | Channel 5 | Panelist | Multiple appearances |

== Works ==
- Don't Cry Aloud Hopcyn Press 2015 ISBN 9780992893323
- Winds of War Little Books 2009 ISBN 9781906264079
- None To Make You Cry Little Books 2009 ISBN 9781906264062
- The Promise Little Books 2008 ISBN 9781904435976
- The Second Wife Little Books 2008 ISBN 9781904435952
- Agony? Don't Get Me Started... Autobiography Max Press 2006 ISBN 9781904435846
- The Bad Sister Little Books 2005 ISBN 9781904435426
- Relax It's Only a Baby Little Books 2005 ISBN 9781904435464
- Men Are From Earth. Women Are From Earth.: Deal with It! Little Books 2005 ISBN 9781904435327
- Sir Tom Cowie, A True Entrepreneur: A Biography University of Sunderland 2004 ISBN 9781873757840
- A Relative Freedom ISBN 9781904435853
- Wait For the Day ISBN 9781904435556
- The Beloved People (Belgate Trilogy 1) 2004 ISBN 978190443534-1
- Strength for the Morning (Belgate Trilogy 2) 2004 ISBN 9781904435358
- Towards Jerusalem (Belgate Trilogy 3) 2005 ISBN 9781904435372
- A Year of Winter 1986 ISBN 9780094672307
- The Land of Lost Content 1985 ISBN 9780094664401
- Blue Remembered Hills 1987 ISBN 9780753102473
