= Banks & Wag =

British composer duo

Chris Banks and Wag Marshall-Page comprise the composing team known as Banks & Wag, best known for their prolific work scoring CBeebies shows and composing the theme tune to Go Jetters.

Banks and Marshall-Page met whilst studying Commercial Music together at the University of Westminster, which they attended from 1996 1999. After graduation, Chris studied Composition For Screen at the Royal College of Music (1999-2000), continuing to perform with Wag as members of indie band Nnook. The group disbanded in 1999, and the pair went on to work with pop acts including McFly, Sugababes, Busted, Blue, and Sophie Ellis-Bextor; and Wag joined Infadels as bassist.

As composers, they have written for The X Factor, ZingZillas, Year Dot, Strictly Dance Fever, The National Lottery Awards, Ross Noble, Dead Ringers, and Spain's Tele Madrid News, winning a Silver Broadcast Design Award for Best News Theme.

Their title song for How To Start Your Own Country was described as "brilliant" by the Radio Times, "dangerously catchy" by Bella Online, and "worthy of Top of the Pops" by the Daily Mirror. The series went on to win two BAFTAs and spawned an iTunes #1 single in 2005.

Banks was also behind the CBeebies series Space Pirates, whose theme tune topped the iTunes Children's Chart for 11 weeks in 2007–2008.

In 2010, they wrote and produced all the music for the CBeebies series, ZingZillas. On 30 August 2010, the series' first single "Do You Didgeridoo?" was released, reaching #1 in the iTunes Children's Chart.

== Compositions ==
Banks and Wag have composed music for the following television programmes:

- Amazing Greys
- Andy and the Band
- Awkward Situations For Men
- Blue Peter
- Busted: A Ticket For Everyone
- CBeebies Panto: Cinderella
- Danny Wallace's How To Start Your Own Country
- Dave Gorman's Important Astrology Experiment
- Gastronuts
- Go Jetters
- ITV Sport
- Lip Service
- Littlest Pet Shop: A World of Our Own
- National Lottery Awards
- Ross Noble's Australian Trip
- Ross Noble: Nobleism
- Ross Noble: Randomist
- Ross Noble: Unrealtime
- Something Special
- Sorry, I've Got No Head
- Strictly African Dancing
- Strictly Dance Fever
- Stick to What You Know
- Walk On The Wild Side
- The X Factor
- Year Dot
- ZingZillas

=== Banks only ===
- Happy Birthday Brucie!
- Nuzzle and Scratch
- Space Pirates
