= Candis Magazine =

UK magazine

- Club Chairman: Robert Hyatt
- Categories: Family
- Frequency: Monthly
- Publisher: Newhall Publishing
- Founded: 1962
- Country: United Kingdom
- Language: English
- Website: www.candis.co.uk

Candis is the magazine of Candis Club, published monthly by Newhall Publishing. It is a membership magazine focusing on health and family living. Regular features include food, gardening, travel and health together with competitions, puzzles, offers and giveaways.

== History ==
Candis has its origins in 1962, when its founder, Joseph K. Douglas, created the Cancer & Polio Research Fund News Letter, to provide updates on the fundraising activities of the related charity that he had founded.

By 1971 the newsletter was being produced as a fortnightly publication, cost 15 pence and was delivered by hand to customers. It went to full colour by 1981 and cost 60 pence. The serial included updates on cancer and polio research activity, together with a football pool and reader competitions.

By 1985 the newsletter had evolved into a magazine format, containing twenty-eight pages and including a free prize draw, which had replaced the long-standing football pool. The magazine was also now being published by Newhall Publishing.

In 1986 a competition was held among readers to choose a new name with Candis the new name selected.

The magazine has continued to develop to reflect the interests of the members of Candis Club. Candis Club continues to donate to health related charities with over £56 million donated through subscriptions.

== Candis Club ==
Candis is the magazine of Candis Club. Members of Candis Club subscribe to the magazine and benefit from a range of benefits that helping to make savings all year round including everyday shopping, holidays and insurance. Candis members also benefit from the range of special offers and giveaways: travel, car and home insurance, will planning, breakdown and health cover.

== Charitable donations ==
An important part of the Candis Club’s remit is to raise funds for donations to health charities. Donations from 1962 to 2022 amount to over £56 million. Charities benefiting from the Club’s donations include the Cancer and Polio Research Fund (£31 million), Marie Curie (£5 million), Asthma UK (£4 million), Macmillan Cancer Support (£3 million) and BLISS (£3 million).

In 1984, HRH Princess Alexandra opened the Douglas Cyclotron Centre in Clatterbridge Hospital. Membership subscriptions had contributed over £750,000 for the cancer treatment centre, which was named after the club’s founder.

From 2010 Candis has worked together with The Big Give and provided match funding as a Champion for the Big Give Christmas Challenge.
