= Dave Gorman's Important Astrology Experiment =

BBC television comedy series

- Written by: Dave Gorman; Danny Wallace
- Directed by: Gareth Carrivick
- Presented by: Dave Gorman
- Judges: Denise Robertson, Hilary Jones, Alvin Hall
- Theme music composer: Banks & Wag
- Country of origin: United Kingdom
- Original language: English
- No. of series: 1
- No. of episodes: 6

Production
- Executive producer: Myfanwy Moore
- Producers: Dave Gorman; Danny Wallace
- Editor: Nick Watts
- Running time: 30 mins

Original release
- Network: BBC Two
- Release: 1 September – 6 October 2002

Dave Gorman's Important Astrology Experiment is a BBC television comedy series presented by Dave Gorman which was broadcast in 2002. The studio-based show was interspersed with footage of Gorman literally taking the advice of horoscopes for 40 days and nights to see if following astrology enhances love, health and wealth, and, ultimately, happiness.

To see if his life was better for following astrology, Gorman's twin brother Nick was used as a control experiment. A panel of experts - including agony aunt Denise Robertson, TV doctor Hilary Jones and financial advisor Alvin Hall - commented on the success, or otherwise, of the progress of the experiment. The studio audience voted on whether Dave's life was turning out better as a consequence of the experiment compared to Nick's, with results represented as a graph.

The series was cited in a scholarly journal as an example of "television that combines humour with serious topics, which has been increasingly evident since the 1990s" alongside The Mark Thomas Comedy Product and The Mark Steel Lectures. The show was written by Gorman and Danny Wallace, and followed their series The Dave Gorman Collection.

== Episode list ==
No.	Title	Original release date
1	"Episode 1"	1 September 2002
Dave introduces the concept, his twin brother Nick, and the panellists. Following a compilation of people who share his name from The Dave Gorman Collection he makes friends with Olympic swimmer Duncan Goodhew and gravels a school courtyard.
2	"Episode 2"	8 September 2002
A character named Dave Gorman in Neighbours leads Dave Gorman to line dance with a schoolboy in Barrow in Furness, followed by jumping one-legged into a bucket of water at Covent Garden.
3	"Episode 3"	15 September 2002
Featuring Changing Rooms star Linda Barker.
4	"Episode 4"	22 September 2002
Dave travels tens of thousands of miles because his horoscopes tell him to.
5	"Episode 5"	29 September 2002
Features encounters with Uri Geller, TV executive Alan Yentob, Vanessa Feltz, and sneaking a greyhound onto the set of Emmerdale.
6	"Episode 6"	6 October 2002
Dave dresses up as Chris Eubank and visits a golf course in Dubai.
