= ZingZillas =

British television show for pre-school children

- Show logo
- Created by: Barry Quinn, Stephen Cannon, Alan Robinson
- Developed by: CBeebies in association with BBC Worldwide, Barry Quinn, Stephen Cannon, Alan Robinson
- Directed by: Tom Poole (series 1-2); Richard Bradley; Helen Scott; Dominic Macdonald; Michael Towner; Iwan Watson
- Starring: Michael Offei; Gary Jordan; Penni Tovey; Mark Jefferis (series 1-2); Aidan Cook
- Music by: Banks & Wag
- Country of origin: United Kingdom
- Original language: English
- No. of series: 4
- No. of episodes: 104

Production
- Executive producers: David Collier; Dominic Macdonald; Tony Reed
- Running time: 22 minutes (series 1-2); 11 minutes (series 3-4)
- Production company: BBC In-House Children's Production

Original release
- Network: CBeebies
- Release: 5 April 2010 – 11 June 2012

ZingZillas is a British television programme created by Barry Quinn, Stephen Cannon and Alan Robinson, aimed at young children, broadcast on the BBC pre-school channel CBeebies, which ran from 5 April 2010 to 11 June 2012. It was produced by the BBC's in-house children's unit and distributed globally by sister company, BBC Worldwide.

== Overview ==
ZingZillas is a puppet music show aimed at young children. It is set on an ape-shaped tropical island where everyone joins in to create music magic. They use musical influences from all over the globe from rock to soul, jazz to samba, big band to orchestra.

In every episode from series 3, they wake up and ask Todd for an idea for the day's song. This segment is called ZingJam, where DJ Loose announces it's time for a ZingJam, then the Zingboppers, the Moaning Stones, the Beach Byrds, and finally the Zingzillas shout "ZingJam" in the tune of the theme song and DJ Loose tells one of the Zingzillas to push the button and activate the TV. Todd uses his ideas machine but it always breaks down, or other things happen. They are visited by a different musical guest.

Original music for the series has been composed by Banks & Wag.

On Monday, 30 August 2010, "Do You Didgeridoo?" was released on an EP, alongside the "ZingZillas Theme Tune" and "Bhangra Beat", reaching #1 in the iTunes Children's Chart.

On Monday 4 October 2010, "ZingZillas: The Album" was released on CD and as a digital download, reaching #1 in the iTunes Children's Chart on the first day. The recording features guest tracks by musical luminaries who have appeared on the show including cellist Julian Lloyd Webber flautist James Galway and jazz vocalist Cleo Laine.

On 28 February 2011, CBeebies began broadcasting a 20 part series of five-minute spinoff programmes entitled "Zingzillas Zingbop" which is hosted by DJ Loose, where a small group of children (known as Zingboppers) go to Zingzilla Island and are taught to dance to a Zingzillas song. The Zingboppers then participate in the final Zingbop. It was then commissioned for a second series.

On 11 June 2012, ZingZillas aired its last episode "Picnic Day".

== Characters ==
Each ZingZilla has their own personality:

- Zak (lead vocals/harmonica) is a gorilla who is the lead singer. Zak is the oldest ZingZilla and has a positive attitude. He is serious, confident and likes taking risks. He is played by Jeremiah Krage and voiced by Michael Offei.
- Tang (lead guitar/backing vocals) is an orangutan who plays guitars (acoustic & electric) and backing vocals. He thinks creatively and is never afraid of asking for help whenever there's a problem. He is played by Nick Kellington and voiced by Gary Jordan.
- Panzee (bass/keyboard/backing vocals) is a chimpanzee who plays bass, keyboards and backing vocals and loves to dress up. She is sensitive, fun and always ready to try something new. She is played by Sarah-Jane Honeywell and Victoria Bovingdon and voiced by Penni Tovey.
- Drum (drums/backing vocals) is a golden lion tamarin who plays drums, percussion and backing vocals. She is the youngest ZingZilla. She loves exploring sounds and enjoys making rhythms and noise. She is very sensitive to the mood of music. She is played by Cecily Fay and Rachelle Beinart and voiced by Penni Tovey.

=== Other characters ===
- Todd is a middle-aged mandrill and the 'father figure' of the ZingZillas. He is helpful, inventive and accident-prone. He is played and voiced by Aidan Cook.
- Auntie Dot is a relation of Todd. She is played and voiced by Penni Tovey.
- DJ Loose is the island's sloth. He plays the ZingZillas music made by real people in the glade. He is puppeteered and voiced by Mark Jefferis (Series 1 & 2) and Josh Elwell (Series 3 & 4).
- The Beach Byrds (Maxine (blue), Patti (purple) and Laverne (pink)) are tropical birds who work in the coconut hut and say everything tunefully. They also sing the disaster song (in Good To Be Me the ZingZillas sing it).
- The Moaning Stones are similar to the standing moai heads on Easter Island. Although four are shown, only the middle pair called Gravel (happy face) and Granite (grumpy face) talk and count coconuts in the coconut clock. While Gravel is cheerful and optimistic, Granite is grouchy, pessimistic, but well-meaning.
- The Zingboppers are different groups of children who were debuted in series 3. They do monkey moves for the Big Zing and dance along.

== Episodes & guest performers ==
=== Series overview ===
Series	Episodes	Originally released	
Series	Episodes	First released	Last released
1	26	5 April 2010	5 July 2010
2	26	18 October 2010	24 December 2010
3	26	21 November 2011	6 February 2012
4	26	23 April 2012	11 June 2012

=== Series 1 (2010) ===
No. overall	No. in series	Title	Directed by	Written by	Original release date
1	1	"Didgeridoo Hullabaloo"	Tom Poole	David Richard Fox	5 April 2010
The deep rumbling sounds can be heard around the island and the ZingZillas rush to the glade to see where it's coming from. Todd thinks it's his tummy rumbling but the ZingZillas quickly discover that the majestic droning sound is coming from a didgeridoo being played by Dhinawan. DJ Loose explains that the didgeridoo is a very old instrument and when Panzee tells the Moaning Stones all about it she finds out that even though they are also very old neither of them have ever celebrated their birthdays. The ZingZillas have decided to do a didgeridoo Big Zing and although it sounds fantastic, Panzee feels really sad about the Moaning Stones never celebrating their birthdays. The others agree and so they decide to do something to celebrate Granite and Gravel's birthdays. They split into teams and head off into the jungle to see if they can find a suitable present. Sadly neither the Tang and Zak team nor the Panzee and Drum team can find anything. But they do manage to get some wrapping paper from Todd. But what good is wrapping paper with no gift to wrap? Drum has an idea - they can create didgeridoos from the cardboard tubes in the wrapping paper. Todd is not feeling too good - he has eaten too much fruit trying to get his tummy to stop rumbling. The ZingZillas explain that the rumbling sound is coming from the didgeridoo in the glade, not Todd's tummy. Todd is very relieved and finds them much colourful paint to use to decorate the cardboard tubes. Granite and Gravel are thrilled with their didgeridoos and can't wait to play them in the Big Zing, which is lucky because the last coconut falls, so it's that time of day. Guest performer: Dhinawan
2	2	"Tang's Happy Day"	Richard Bradley	Alexandra Owen	5 April 2010
It's a beautiful sunny day and Tang has decided to play a really happy song for the Big Zing. A sunny piece of music coming from the glade sounds perfect for his happy song - it's the happy, jazzy sound of the vibraphone. Tang can't wait to play his song to the others but each time he finds someone to play it too they need his help instead. Before he gets a chance to play though they either dash off, fall asleep or are just too hot to listen. The only person he finds to play his happy song to is Yapple - Drum's stuffed toy pineapple! As he sings his song he realises that because of him the others have all had a happy day even though they haven't heard his song. Drum is happy because she got the banana she wanted, Todd is happy because he's learned a new way to get bananas out of the trees, Zak is happy because he got his bat and ball to work, the Beach Byrds are happy because they served him a drink, DJ Loose is happy because he was able to have a nap, Granite is happy because his new knotted handkerchief hat cooled him down, Mr Gravel is happy because Mr Granite is happy and Panzee is happy because she found her flowers. Tang realises that it has been a very happy day even if he didn't sing his song to anyone. As he sings his happy song to Yapple the others creep into the clubhouse and join in. They all love Tang's happy song and can't wait to sing it with him in the Big Zing. Guest performer: Jim Hart
3	3	"Rock Guitar"	Helen Scott	Jack Jameson	6 April 2010
The ZingZillas are very excited because all their instruments have been cleaned and polished. Being lead singer, Zak does not have a newly-polished instrument and so DJ Loose has sent him a new broom instead. Tang, Panzee and Drum cannot wait to play their instruments and so they all head over to the glade to get some ideas for the Big Zing. In the glade DJ Loose introduces them to the BMQ - a very loud rock band. The ZingZillas love the sound and Zak particularly likes the way they play their rock guitars, so they decide to do a rock music Big Zing and head back to the clubhouse to rehearse. Zak is not happy though - he really wants to play rock guitar too and announces that he does not want to be in the Big Zing unless he can play guitar. The others try to help him but he will never be able to learn in time for the Big Zing so heads over to DJ Loose for some advice. DJ suggests that Zak rocks along to the rocking music instead. Although rocking to the music is great fun Zak still wants to play rock guitar. He heads down to find Todd to see if he has any suggestions. Zak finds Todd over near the glade. He is listening to the rock music and playing rock broom guitar. Todd explains that even if you cannot play guitar it is fun to pretend you can - all you need is a broom! Zak has a go with his broom and really enjoys it.Todd has saved the day and both he and Zak play rock broom guitar in the Big Zing. Guest performer: The BMQ
4	4	"Auntie Dot’s Dash"	Richard Bradley	Dominic Macdonald	7 April 2010
Todd's Auntie Dot is coming to visit and watch the Big Zing. The ZingZillas are very excited and they decide to rehearse a special welcome song for Auntie Dot. However, Todd gets a phone call from Auntie Dot to say she is stuck in the jungle and will not make it to the Big Zing. Todd is worried. He knows that the ZingZillas will be very disappointed by the news. He decides to disguise himself as Auntie Dot, if he pretends to be her, the ZingZillas will not be disappointed. Outside, dressed as Auntie, he meets Tang. Tang wants Auntie to say hello to Todd. 'Auntie' tells Tang Todd is on the beach. After changing back into Todd, Todd races off to the beach where Tang takes him to meet Auntie! However they hear bagpipes and Tang goes to the glade to listen to the music. The ZingZillas agree that bagpipes are perfect for their welcome Auntie Dot song. However, they cannot practice while Dot is downstairs so Zak persuades 'Auntie' to visit the Moaning Stones. The Stones tell 'Auntie' that everybody will be at the Big Zing and Todd realises that he cannot be Auntie Dot and Todd at the same time. He confesses to the disappointed ZingZillas. Then, at the last minute Auntie Dot appears on a banana car, driven by the Beach Byrds who found her in the jungle. Now Auntie Dot will get to see the Big Zing. The ZingZillas play the Big Zing with Martin McKay on bagpipes. Auntie Dot thoroughly enjoys the show. Todd is very relieved! Guest performer: Piper Martin McKay
5	5	"ScatZilla!"	Tom Poole	Anna Starkey	8 April 2010
Tang, Panzee and Drum have come up with a great tune for the Big Zing but Zak just can't think of any words to go with it. He suggests he plays the only instrument he can play instead - the harmonica - but Tang points out that Zak has lost it! Zak is at a complete loss and announces that he will not be in the Big Zing. This is a disaster so Todd sets to work making a new instrument for Zak to play instead. In the meantime DJ Loose introduces Zak to Cleo Laine and the art of scatting. Zak loves the way she makes up special words which match the music and decides that he's going to Scat in the Big Zing. Before he has a chance to practise though Todd arrives with his newly-invented instrument. The wheezing sound coming from the instrument is so loud Todd doesn't hear Zak explaining that he doesn't need an instrument now - he's going to scat instead. But it's too late, Todd has wrapped the instrument around Zak and left him to practise. Luckily DJ Loose comes to the rescue again and helps untangle Zak from the odd instrument. Zak starts to practise scatting but just can't seem to get it right. When the machine begins to make even more odd, but rhythmic, sounds Zak starts to mimic it and quickly finds his scatting vibe. The other ZingZillas love the sound of his scatting and think it's perfect for the Big Zing. Guest performers: Cleo Laine, John Dankworth & Friends
6	6	"Operatic Todd"	Richard Bradley	Mike James	9 April 2010
Having seen opera singer Sarah Connolly in the glade, the ZingZillas decide that the Big Zing will be a story about a princess who is rescued from a tower by a prince. They set about creating the Big Zing Opera. Zak will be the story teller and Sarah will be the princess but they need someone else with an operatic voice to play the prince. Granite isn't very impressed by Gravel's singing and so they decide to count coconuts instead. The coconut clock is counting and the ZingZillas don't have much time to find their prince. Suddenly they hear wonderful operatic singing coming from Todd's cave - it's Todd! Todd is having a bath having been covered in mud while using his latest potato-picking invention but when asked he is very excited about being the prince in the Big Zing Opera. However when they all rehearse Todd's voice sounds more like a parrot. The ZingZillas try to help him find his operatic voice but it's no good, he sounds dreadful. More coconuts are dropping and they still don't have a prince for the Big Zing Opera' It's a disaster! Following another spot of potato digging Todd is in the bath again. He likes to sing while he's in the bath! Guest performers: BBC Concert Orchestra with Sarah Connolly & Ben Foster
7	7	"Sticker Trouble"	Helen Scott	Simon Nicholson	12 April 2010
Tang and Panzee have been talking about duets when DJ Loose asks them to meet him over at the Glade. They join DJ, Zak and Drum to watch Julian Lloyd Webber playing his cello. Panzee loves the sound and wonders if Julian will play a duet with her. DJ asks and the answer is yes. Julian also asked him to give a cello sticker to Panzee. Panzee is over the moon and cherishes the sticker. Up in the clubhouse the ZingZillas decide to do a Big Zing all about playing together. The song will feature the special duet between Panzee and Julian but Panzee just can't seem to get it right. Looking at the cello sticker gives her more confidence and she manages to play the piece perfectly. She cannot wait to show off her sticker and rushes around the island to show everyone. Panzee doesn't notice the sticker falling off and is devastated when the Moaning Stones point out that the sticker is missing. No one knows it but the sticker is now stuck to Todd's back. When the ZingZillas try to rehearse the song again Panzee just can't get her duet piece right without the sticker. They all decide to search the island for it; with no sticker there will be no duet and with no duet The Big Zing will be cancelled! And Shezap Runs Away. Thankfully Todd found the sticker on his back and Panzee does not need a sticker so they all played together in the Big Zing. Guest performer: Julian Lloyd-Webber
8	8	"Bhangra Beats"	Tom Poole	Mike James	13 April 2010
Zak decides that the ZingZillas should start the day with some exercise. Drum wants to stay and help Todd with his new clothes dryer so just Panzee, Tang and Zak jog off into the jungle. While doing their exercises Zak makes up a tune and some words for them to exercise to. It's the perfect jogging and moving, dancing and grooving song for the Big Zing so they decide to head back to the clubhouse to practise it with Drum. Zak knows a short cut so they jog off. Unfortunately Zak's shortcut takes them in completely the wrong direction and they end up on the far side of the island. All the time coconuts are falling in the coconut clock and the ZingZillas don't have their song ready for the Big Zing. In the meantime Drum has enjoyed watching a Bhangra group performing in the glade. The group consists of a few musicians plus a lot of dancers. One of the musicians is playing the dhol drum and the beat of the drum tells the dancers to do a different step. Drum loves the dancing and is soon joining in but DJ is getting very worried about the other ZingZillas, especially when he finds out they are on the far side of the island. He tells them the quickest way back but even so he's not sure they'll make it in time for the Big Zing. He thinks Drum should prepare to do the Big Zing by herself so she suggests doing a Bhangra Big Zing. She uses one of Todd's clean sheets as a costume and, with the help of the Beach Byrds, starts to practise. They combine Drum's Bhangra dancing with Zak's bouncing exercise song to create a magnificent Bhangra Big Zing. Drum Plays The Can Can and She Dances Away. Todd even has enough sheets for them to have a costume each. Guest performers: Jugnu Bhangra
9	9	"Squeaky Boots"	Richard Bradley	Dominic Macdonald	14 April 2010
Panzee's new boots have arrived and she can't wait to try them on. As soon as she puts them on though the boots start to squeak and the squeaky sound is very annoying. DJ Loose introduces the ZingZillas to the sounds of bluegrass. A bluegrass band Kicking Alice is accompanied by a troop of Appalachian cloggers. The ZingZillas love the sound and Panzee particularly likes the clogging. They decide to play a Bluegrass inspired Big Zing with Panzee clogging too. Panzee wants to do the clogging in her new boots, but the others can't stand the squeaking sound coming from her boots. Panzee jumps to the wrong conclusion that they just didn't like her dancing. She rushes off to practice somewhere else and the others realise that if they can't practise properly they won't be ready in time for the Big Zing! On the way to the coconut hut Panzee passes Todd who thinks his gate has started squeaking again. The Beach Byrds think Panzee's squeaking boots are a mouse and the constant squeaking really tests Granite's nerves! After a short practice at the coconut hut, Panzee thinks she's ready for the Big Zing and heads back to the clubhouse to show the others. Once again though the squeaking of the boots stops the rehearsal and Panzee thinks she needs to practice even more and heads off to the Moaning Stones' beach. This is just too much for Granite and he blows his top. A very sad Panzee heads back to the clubhouse but before she gets there bumps into Todd who is still to fix her Boots. Todd thinks he may have a solution for her problem. Guest performers: Kickin' Alice
10	10	"Sweet Dreams"	Richard Bradley	Matt Brito	15 April 2010
It is the night of the Night-time Big Zing and Drum is really excited about staying up late. But the other ZingZillas have to persuade her to have a sleep in the afternoon first or she will be too tired to play. Tang tries to tell Drum but when he says Big Night Zing she dashes off in excitement. DJ Loose thinks he can help so Tang and DJ go to the glade. They see a harp being played by Catrin Finch. The dreamy sound of the harp gives Tang an idea! The Band can write a lullaby to send Drum to sleep. Back at the clubhouse the band rehearse the lullaby, while down below Drum has heard the sweet music and has curled up and gone to sleep. Todd suspects that she was excited about the Big Night Zing. Drum hears this, wakes up and dashes into the jungle in her excitement. Now the ZingZillas have to catch her again! Eventually they find her in the glade, fast asleep, listening to the harp playing. However it is now evening and time to wake her up! The ZingZillas gather to play the Big Night Zing Drift Away accompanied by the harp. At the end of the song the tired Drum does drift away to sleep - finally. Guest performer: Catrin Finch
11	11	"A Great Place to Live"	Dominic Macdonald	David Collier	16 April 2010
Zak discovers Todd stuck behind a load of boxes in his cave. It transpires that Todd has run out of room so Zak suggests he moves into the clubhouse with the ZingZillas. The others think this is a great idea until Todd starts to join in with their Big Zing rehearsal. They need to rehearse without being disturbed so the ZingZillas decide to move to the coconut hut. When the Beach Byrds hear the ZingZillas rehearsing loudly they decide to move out of the coconut hut. Soon the whole island is on the move. Without the Beach Byrds, though, the ZingZillas think the coconut hut is too quiet so they move to the glade where they watch James Knight playing saxophone. Todd feels a little lonely on his own in the clubhouse so he decides to go to the coconut hut. The ZingZillas feel sorry that they left Todd on his own so they move back to the clubhouse and the Beach Byrds think Todd's cave is too little and too dark so they decide to move back to the coconut hut - everyone is on the move again. Even the Moaning Stones think it would be nice to move away from their beach but it is nice and quiet and they need to be near the coconut clock so they can count coconuts. They change their mind when everyone else decides to head for their beach and find the perfect spot out in Todd's garden. Meanwhile, Panzee, Tang and Drum bring their instruments to the beach and they, Zak, Todd and the Beach Byrds quickly realise that without the Moaning Stones the last coconut won't be counted and if the last coconut isn't counted the Big Zing will be cancelled. Todd grabs hold of the coconut clock and manages to stop the coconut from falling until the ZingZillas get the Moaning Stones back to the beach. Thankfully the Moaning Stones are back and the Big Zing is back on track. Guest performer: James Knight
12	12	"Bubble Trouble"	Tom Poole	Ian Carney	19 April 2010
It is extremely hot on ZingZilla Island. In fact, Zak is hotter than hot with extra hot on top. It is too hot to even think of a Big Zing so he takes a big swig of his lemonade instead. He should really be drinking water instead on such a hot day but he likes the way the bubbles tickle the back of his nose. DJ Loose calls up and suggests the ZingZillas go to the glade to meet his piano playing guest - it might give them some ideas for the Big Zing. The ZingZillas all meet up at the glade and watch a performance by boogie woogie player Elio Pace. Boogie woogie is a style of music you can play on the piano and is music for dancing. The ZingZillas decide that the Big Zing should be a boogie woogie song but every time Zak opens his mouth he hiccups and produces a stream of bubbles. They enlist the help of Todd who is sure to have a cure for hiccups. He tries to shock Zak, but that doesn't work and when he makes a scary face that just makes Zak laugh and produce even more bubbles. With no Zak there can be no Big Zing so Tang suggests he plays the keyboards instead, but Zak can't play the keyboards and doesn't have time to learn how to play - he might have to miss the Big Zing! The Zingzillas go back to the glade to watch the boogie woogie, where Elio tries to help Zak play a simple tune on the keyboard which is just right for the Big Zing. Guest performer: Elio Pace
13	13	"Tang's Clubhouse"	Richard Bradley	Denise Cassar	20 April 2010
Tang has a very complicated guitar piece to play in the Big Zing and really wants to keep practising. The others want to play tickle chase instead and are being far too noisy for Tang to practise. Over at the glade they discover the orchestra playing Danse Macabre. Within this piece of music there is a solo violin and the ZingZillas realise the name for a piece played on its own is a solo. Tang realises that he's going to be the soloist in the Big Zing and to get his solo just right Tang needs peace and quiet but he doesn't get that in the clubhouse with the other ZingZillas playing tickle chase. Tang decides to look for somewhere else to practise but no matter where he goes he gets disturbed. Todd offers to build him a clubhouse of his own. Todd builds a rickety structure which wasn't quite what Tang was imagining but at least it is his own club house and a great place for him to practise on his own. The other ZingZillas realise they haven't been very considerate to Tang and along with the Beach Byrds go to find him. When they catch up with Tang and squeeze into his clubhouse the whole thing collapses. The others are really worried but Tang thinks it's very funny - he's had plenty of peace and quiet to practise for the Big Zing after all. The ZingZillas are all back together and Tang is happy with his solo - Just in time for the Big Zing and after that Todd fixies the clubhouse. Guest performers: BBC Concert Orchestra, Ben Foster
14	14	"Welcome Beach Byrds"	Uncredited	Dominic Macdonald	21 April 2010
It's bedtime and Tang tells the story of when the Beach Byrds first arrived on ZingZilla Island. Todd was supposed to be showing the Beach Byrds around the island but they'd already headed off before he arrived at the coconut hut. Todd couldn't find them anywhere but the Beach Byrds managed to find the Moaning Stones and their way to the glade, where they watched a gamelan performance. They even managed to find their way to the clubhouse where they joined in with the ZingZillas' rehearsal. They were having a lovely holiday and couldn't wait to see the whole island. The Beach Byrds were such lovely singers the ZingZillas decided to ask them to join in with the Big Zing, but they didn't know where they'd gone and the Beach Byrds had left their map of the island behind. The ZingZillas had to find Todd so he could help them find the Beach Byrds. It was a disaster - the Beach Byrds were wandering around the island without a map, Todd was chasing round the jungle looking for the Beach Byrds and the ZingZillas were chasing after Todd. Eventually the ZingZillas found Todd and together they found a trail of Beach Byrd feathers leading all the way back to the coconut hut. Here the Beach Byrds had settled in and decided they were going to stay and live on the island. DJ Loose was thrilled because he now had some help keeping the coconut hut tidy and the ZingZillas were thrilled because the Beach Byrds could join in with every Big Zing. Guest performers: Lila Cita
15	15	"Zak's Rubbish Day"	Helen Scott	Dominic Macdonald	22 April 2010
It's Tidy Island Day and Tang asks Zak to write the words for a tidy song. Zak is really struggling and each time he writes a word on a piece of paper, he just scrunches it up and throws it over his shoulder. Tang is very unimpressed by the mess in the clubhouse and, when he follows Tang down to Todd's garden, Zak discovers that Tang is the judge and whoever can keep the island the tidiest for the whole day wins a Squeaky Clean badge. Both Zak and Todd would like to win the badge and Zak rushes off to have a good tidy up. Having picked all the rubbish up, Zak throws it over the balcony, where it lands all over Todd's garden. Tang is now very unimpressed with the tidiness of Todd's garden. Zak thinks a new sound for the Big Zing will help him come up with some words so DJ takes them to listen to Julian Bliss playing clarinet in the glade. Meanwhile, Todd has realized that the rubbish in his garden belongs to Zak and returns it to the clubhouse. Unfortunately Drum accidentally throws her banana in the bin and in trying to find it, spills all the litter back over the clubhouse floor. When Zak and Tang arrive back, Judge Tang is very unimpressed. Zak and Drum quickly tidy all the rubbish up and Drum throws it back over the balcony and back into Todd's garden - just in time for Todd and Tang to arrive back. Tang is again very unimpressed with Todd's untidy garden. The clubhouse is tidy but Zak still hasn't come up with any words for the Big Zing. As he explains that he wrote one word on each piece of paper, he realizes that he may have just stumbled on the answer. He rushes back down to Todd's garden to look for his words, in time for the Big Zing. Guest performer: Julian Bliss
16	16	"Disappearing Drum"	Helen Scott	Adam Redfern	29 June 2010
Drum is listening to a pair of Japanese Taiko drummers called Hiten Ryu Daiko playing in the glade. Drum loves it! She then decides to go and fetch her stuffed toy pineapple, Yapple. In the clubhouse Zak is trying to write a song called The Big Noise Song. Drum enters, picks Yapple up and goes. Drum gets back to the glade and then decides she wants her cushion too. Back in the clubhouse the ZingZillas are about to start rehearsing the Big Noise song. However, Drum is missing so Panzee volunteers to look for her. Panzee searches the coconut hut and the Moaning Stones beach before spotting Drum crossing the jungle. Drum makes her way into the clubhouse where she grabs her cushion and slips past Panzee on her way out. The band decide to practice the Making A Big Noise song without Drum but it doesn't sound right. Panzee decides to hide and follow Drum to wherever she is going. Drum comes back to the clubhouse in search of drumsticks. Panzee follows her to the glade and discovers the Taiko drummers for herself. Panzee tries to persuade Drum to come back and practice the Big Zing song but Drum refuses. She wants to listen to the Taiko drums. Panzee then has an idea - why don't the Taiko drummers play in the 'Making A Big Noise' Big Zing? Then Drum could listen to them and play music. Drum thinks this is a wonderful idea. In the Big Zing they all play the 'Making A Big Noise' song and Hiten Ryu Daiko make a really big noise on their Taiko Drums. Guest performers: Joji Hirota & Hiten Ryu Daiko
17	17	"Keep Your Castanets"	Tom Poole	Dominic Macdonald	26 April 2010
Drum has lost Yapple again, but she finally finds her wrapped around the banana phone when it rings. Tang answers the phone - its DJ asking them to meet him in the glade. The ZingZillas enjoy watching a flamenco performance with Spanish guitar and a flamenco dancer. Drum is particularly enamoured with the clickety-clackety castanet playing, and the flamenco dancer, Verena, throws some castanets up to her. The ZingZillas decide to do a flamenco Big Zing with Tang playing flamenco guitar, Drum playing castanets and Panzee dancing the flamenco. They head to the clubhouse to rehearse. The song sounds great and they can't wait to tell DJ about it so they head off to find him. Before they go, Drum finds a safe place to leave her new castanets. She puts them on the windowsill and asks Yapple to look after them, but they fall from the sill and land on Todd's head. When the ZingZillas return to the clubhouse, Drum can't understand where the castanets have gone and the others can't believe she's lost them. Drum realises they may have fallen into Todd's garden and when she goes to ask Todd, they fall off his head as he bends to listen to her. Drum has her castanets back and so the ZingZillas rehearse again. This time Panzee twirls Drum around, and as she does so the castanets accidentally fly out of the clubhouse and land in Todd's postbox. The ZingZillas can't believe Drum has lost the castanets again. Without the castanets there can be no Big Zing, so Todd sets out to find them one more time. Guest performers: Angus Cruickshank, Verena Menichellui
18	18	"The Fan Letter"	Tom Poole	Dominic Macdonald	27 April 2010
A band of primate friends play music in their tropical island paradise and meet different musical guests. The ZingZillas rush to the glade to hear Jay Phelps play a trumpet fanfare. They decide to write a trumpety Big Zing that will announce they are the best band in the world! Zak reads a fan letter saying that he is the best singer in the whole world. Zak is thrilled and hangs the fan letter up for all to see. The ZingZillas then play the new song. The lyrics to the chorus are about how the ZingZillas are the best band in the land. At the end of the practice, Zak makes some changes to the lyrics. This time the chorus is all about how Zak is the best singer in the land. Before the others can object, Zak finds a pair of sunglasses to suit his new cool image and heads off. Panzee is not sure she likes the new Zak. In Todd's garden Zak bumps into the post box as he can't see properly through his new shades. He decides that to help people know he is important he is going to have a fanfare played every time somebody new sees him. Todd is worried. On the beach Granite and Gravel listen while Zak enters to a fanfare and announces that he has changed the name of the band to Zak and the ZingZillas. The Moaning Stones are worried. DJ Loose is worried too. Back in Todd's garden Zak tells the others he wants to be the only one singing today's Big Zing. Fed up with Zak's behaviour, Tang, Drum and Panzee leave to set up a new band! Zak realises his mistake and decides to write them a fan letter to persuade them to get together again in time for the Big Zing. Guest performer: Jay Phelps
19	19	"Hide and Seek"	Richard Bradley	Matt Brito	28 April 2010
As soon as the group wake up Zak wants to play hide and seek. The others remind him that they need to get the Big Zing ready. DJ Loose calls them on the banana phone and they head straight to the glade where they watch and listen to Dame Evelyn Glennie playing tubular bells. The sound of the bells inspires them to sing a song about all the bells they hear every day. The song comes to them very quickly and so they decide to spend the rest of the day playing hide and seek. Panzee is the seeker and, just in case it takes her a long time to find the others, Tang suggests she plays some notes on Drum's tubular bells to call them back if it's time to play the Big Zing. Panzee counts and the others rush off to hide. Panzee doesn't really like playing hide and seek and very quickly decides to use the bells to call them back. The others are not impressed and Panzee promises to play properly and so they rush off and hide again. Panzee can't find any of the other ZingZillas and returns, frustrated, to the clubhouse where she is joined by DJ Loose. DJ needs them all to get ready for the Big Zing and so Panzee rings the bells to call the others back. Zak, Drum and Tang think she is trying to trick them again and stay hidden. This is a big problem and so Panzee and DJ rush to the glade to see if Evelyn Glennie playing her bells really loudly will get the others to come out of hiding and head to the glade. Guest performer: Dame Evelyn Glennie
20	20	"Birthday Todd"	Richard Bradley	Simon Davies	29 April 2010
It's Todd's birthday and he thinks nobody has remembered, but Panzee is planning to give Todd a surprise birthday party. The ZingZillas need a cake, streamers and a special song. They compose the words to a birthday song. Panzee tells everyone the plan: she will make the cake, Zak will make the streamers, Tang can find the right music for the song and Drum has to keep Todd away from the clubhouse until they are ready for the party. When Todd walks in, Panzee persuades him there is a problem over at the coconut hut and he heads off. Drum follows. However Todd soon finds out there is no problem at the hut and moves on. Tang finds DJ Loose and DJ suggests visiting the glade for inspiration. In the glade, Tang and DJ watch The Silk Street Hot 7, a traditional jazz band, perform. It is the perfect music for Tang. He returns to the clubhouse where Panzee has almost made the cake and the streamers are almost up. Then they hear Todd outside. The ZingZillas tear everything down, so that Todd doesn't see them and in the chaos the cake mixture falls from the balcony and lands on Todd's head. While Todd goes into his cave to clean up the ZingZillas rehearse their song with Tang's music. Todd heads off to see if there are any jobs to do at the Moaning Stones Beach, but he spots the Stones in party hats and he begins to guess what is going on. In the coconut hut Drum admits there will be a party for Todd and he rushes back to the clubhouse, where Panzee, Tang and Zak hear him. They tear down the decorations again, before he sees them, but this time, the finished cake ends up on Todd's head! Guest performers: Silk Street Hot Seven
21	21	"Gravel and Granite's Quiet Night In"	Helen Scott	Dominic Macdonald	5 July 2010
It is night-time in the ZingZillas clubhouse. Tang decides to tell Drum the story of Gravel and Granite's Quiet Night In. It was a day when there was no Big Zing. This was a problem for Gravel and Granite, as that meant no coconut clock and so no coconuts to count. So Gravel and Granite have nothing to do. Gravel suggests they have a quiet night in. Just then Todd joins them and suggests Gravel and Granite watch their favourite shows, eat snacks and invite some of their friends over. Gravel and Granite think this is a marvellous idea. However, they have no TV. Todd goes to DJ Loose and borrows one. They watch a Big Zing, 'Our Island Home' performed with Gamelan Orchestra, Lila Cita, and Silat dancer, Cecily Fay. Gravel and Granite then persuade Todd to lend them his sofa and watch another Big Zing - Julian Lloyd Webber playing the cello with the ZingZillas. Gravel and Granite then send Todd to get popcorn, so goes off, and comes back utterly exhausted. Then they all watch Hiten Ryu Daiko, the Japanese Taiko drummers; play 'Making A Big Noise'. Afterwards DJ and the Beach Byrds arrive to party! But Todd has fallen asleep on the sofa, so they watch a quiet Big Zing on the television: 'Drift Away' which features Catrin Finch, the harpist. The gentle music sends everybody to sleep. Gravel and Granite are the last to fall asleep, happy that their quiet night in has been such a success. Tang explains to Drum that when then Stones close their eyes the whole Island goes to sleep. He looks down and sees that Drum has fallen asleep, as have Zak and Panzee. So Tang goes to the balcony and says a last goodnight to Todd before heading off to bed.
22	22	"The Z Factor"	Dominic Macdonald	Daniel Edwards	28 June 2010
Zak has decided to play harmonica in the Big Zing but he can't play harmonica and sing at the same time. Both Panzee and Tang want to be the lead singer and so to help him decide who it should be DJ Loose suggests they hold an audition. Zak thinks a competition to find the best singer is a great idea. Drum, Zak and DJ are the judges while Todd hosts the auditions. Panzee sings brilliantly but her audition is interrupted by Tang making a loud honking sound with his hooter. When it's Tang's turn to audition Panzee gets her own back by blowing really hard on a tuba halfway through Tang's song. Zak thinks they were both great and still can't decide. DJ suggests he has some quiet time to help think it over. Zak's time is all but quiet though with the Beach Byrds demanding to be picked, the Moaning Stones singing their audition song and Todd squawking his audition piece. As Zak tries to find somewhere quiet to hide he bumps into Tang who begs Zak to pick him. Zak accidentally says yes to Tang and then does the same thing to Panzee when she begs him. As they try and rehearse the Big Zing they realise Zak has made promises to them both. Panzee and Tang are not happy and both declare that unless they can sing the Big Zing there will be no Big Zing... Guest performer: Philip Achille
23	23	"Panzee's Photograph"	Helen Scott	Denise Cassar	30 April 2010
Panzee wants the ZingZillas to send photos of themselves to their fans. DJ has a camera and offers to take the photos for them. The only problem is that his camera battery is running low. He takes nice photos of Tang, Zak and Drum but when it's Panzee's turn she swats away a fly just as he takes the photo. The battery on the camera is now completely flat and he can't take an alternative photo of Panzee. He assures her that it will be good and while he prints them up he suggests they go and listen to the fun and funky sounds of Dr Lonnie Smith playing the Hammond organ over in the glade. The ZingZillas love the sound and decide to do a Big Zing all about fun and friendship. DJ Loose has printed all the photographs and Zak, Tang and Drum are really pleased with theirs. Panzee however is very upset with hers and thinks she looks silly - she doesn't want to send it to her fans. The others offer not to send their either but Panzee realises they are being really good friends and can't expect them not to send their photos just because she doesn't like hers. She agrees for DJ to print up many copies. While they wait they rehearse their fun and upbeat song about friendship but Panzee is so upset about her photo she finds it hard to be upbeat. Luckily though, Todd has an old camera and offers to take a new photo of Panzee to cheer her up. He can only take one photo on his old camera and while the ZingZillas are helping Panzee look her best he accidentally takes the photo. It's a disaster. Instead of being a nice photo of Panzee it's going to be a silly photo of all of them falling over. Panzee is even more upset than ever - until she sees Todd's photo. Guest performers: Dr. Lonnie Smith, Jamire Williams & Jonathan Kreisberg
24	24	"Tang's Hooter"	Richard Bradley	Adam Redfern	30 June 2010
Tang has been working on a quiet and gentle song for the Big Zing and can't wait to play it to Zak. Zak though gives Tang a loud and parping hooter as a present and really wants him to play it in the Big Zing. Tang doesn't think the hooter will sound right with his quiet and gentle piece but doesn't have the heart to tell Zak and so he decides to hide the hooter instead. Over in the glade all the ZingZillas and DJ Loose like listening to Sir James Galway playing the flute. He plays a gentle piece of music followed by a more upbeat, funky and jazzy piece. Tang thinks the gentle style of flute playing would go beautifully with his gentle Big Zing song. However, Zak thinks they don't need the flute because they have the hooter. He can't believe his ears when Tang admits to 'losing' the hooter. Zak thinks they must have it for the Big Zing so they all head off searching for it. Todd finds the hooter and returns it to Tang. Tang reluctantly takes it and decides to try and hide it somewhere in the coconut hut instead. DJ catches him in the act and advises that he should tell Zak the truth. Before Tang gets a chance to do it though, Todd finds the hooter again and Zak rushes off with it back to the clubhouse for the rehearsal. Tang is very unhappy with how the song sounds with the hooter and finally tells Zak the truth. Zak is really upset about Tang hiding the hooter and declares that if there is no hooter in the Big Zing then there will be no Zak. Tang seeks the advice of DJ Loose again, who suggests that he changes the song to go with the hooter sound - loud and fast instead of quiet and gentle. Guest performer: Sir James Galway
25	25	"Where's Yapple"	Richard Bradley	Denise Cassar	1 July 2010
Whilst doing some repairs in the clubhouse Todd accidentally knocks Drum's cuddly toy, Yapple, into his tool box and carries her off. Drum is distraught when she can't find Yapple and refuses to practise for the Big Zing. No matter how many silly things Zak does, Drum still doesn't cheer up. Tang rushes to DJ Loose for help. DJ takes Tang to the glade where they see an orchestra. The orchestra plays the same bit of music in a slow sad way and then in a bouncy happy way. Tang realises the way the music is played makes him feel different and so rushes back to the clubhouse to play their Big Zing song in a different way in order to cheer Drum up. It works until Zak mentions Yapple, sending Drum into a very bad mood. Once again Tang heads to DJ Loose for some advice. The Beach Byrds are also in a bad mood because of Todd's hammering and DJ has calmed them down by getting the orchestra to play some calm music. Tang rushes back to the clubhouse to play their music in a calm way. It works again until Zak mentions Yapple again! Luckily Todd finds Yapple in his tool box and returns her to Drum. Drum is happy again just in time for the Big Zing. Guest performers: BBC Concert Orchestra, Ben Foster
26	26	"Tuba Swaps"	Tom Poole	Katie Simmons	2 July 2010
Tang is intrigued by a twisty object which is covered in creepers and goes to show the others. Panzee thinks it looks like a twisty vase and would look lovely with flowers in it. When she asks if she can have it, Tang isn't so sure, but when Panzee offers to swap a banana for it, Tang says yes. Panzee is thrilled and heads straight off to look for some flowers over at the Coconut Hut. The Beach Byrds are also rather taken by the twisty vase - only they think it would make an excellent fruit bowl. They offer to swap some feathers for it and Panzee agrees. With feathers in hand Panzee joins the others and DJ Loose over at the glade. They watch a wonderful performance by oompah band, the Bavarian Stompers. The ZingZillas decide to do an oompah Big Zing. When DJ explains that this style of music is called oompah because of the sound the tuba makes, Tang suddenly realises that the twisty thing Todd gave him is in fact a tuba - not a vase or a fruit bowl. Tang really wants to play the tuba in the Big Zing, so he offers to swap the banana for the tuba, but the Beach Byrds aren't interested. Tang decides to look for something else that will make an oompah sound instead - Todd offers him the use of some bellows. In the clubhouse, Panzee has been busy making oompah hats with the feathers the Beach Byrds gave her. Tang explains that he's going to try and use the bellows to make the oompah sound he wants for the Big Zing but when they rehearse the bellows just don't sound right. They really need the tuba back to make the Big Zing work, but the Beach Byrds won't swap. Panzee thinks they may swap the tuba for the hats she's made though... Guest performers: The Amazing Bavarian Stompers

=== Series 2 (2010) ===
No. overall	No. in series	Title	Directed by	Written by	Original release date
27	1	"Super Zak"	Richard Bradley	Tony Reed	18 October 2010
Zak has decided to be a superhero, Super Zak, and the ZingZillas need to find a super new sound for their superhero Big Zing. Is Zak the only superhero on the island though? Guest performer: Lydia Kavina
28	2	"Panzee Gets the Giggles"	Richard Bradley	Simon Davies	19 October 2010
Having seen the Swingle Singers, the ZingZillas decide to create a Big Zing using the sounds they can make with their mouths and voices. Panzee, though, just can't stop giggling! Guest performers: The Swingle Singers
29	3	"Bam-Boo!"	Richard Bradley	Simon Nicholson	20 October 2010
A loud clattering sound from outside makes Zak jump, and so he sings a song all about being a big brave gorilla and not being scared, to prove to the others that he's not scared of anything. After seeing some Andean pipers in the glade, the ZingZillas decide that they should make some panpipes for Zak to play in the Big Zing. Zak rushes off to the other end of the island, where there is a big bamboo bush, to collect some bamboo sticks. Unbeknown to Zak, Todd is trying out his latest banana-picking invention on the other side of the bush. As Zak collects a stick, the banana-picking machine makes a strange noise which scares Zak and he runs off with only one stick. When he returns to the clubhouse, the others can't understand why he only collected one stick and remind him that they need more than one to make their panpipes. Reluctantly Zak goes back to the bush. Another loud groan from the banana-picking machine sends him fleeing yet again with only one piece of bamboo. The other ZingZillas realise that there is a problem and follow Zak as he heads back to the bamboo bush for yet another attempt. This time they all hear the strange sounds. Just as they are about to run away, Todd emerges and explains that the strange noises are coming from his machine. Zak is able to collect all the bamboo he needs just in time for the Big Zing! Guest performers: Kausary
30	4	"Try a Triangle"	Richard Bradley	David Richard Fox	21 October 2010
The ZingZillas have come up with a really upbeat Big Zing which celebrates Drum's drumming. They think the song is great. Over the balcony in Todd's garden, though, they notice Todd wearing a pinny just like the ones the Beach Byrds wear. He can't stop to talk because he's off to work at the coconut hut. The ZingZillas rush to the coconut hut to find out what's going on. When they arrive, they discover the whole place, including DJ Loose, covered with dust sheets. Todd explains that it's spring cleaning day and so, while the Beach Byrds are off cleaning the whole island, he'll be their waiter for the day. It quickly dawns on the ZingZillas though that the Beach Byrds may well tidy away or even throw out their instruments, so they dash back to the clubhouse to rescue them. When they get there, the Beach Byrds have already made a start. Everything in the clubhouse is also covered in dust sheets. Tang, Panzee and Zak manage to get to their guitars and microphone in time but Drum is too late. The Beach Byrds have put her drums out of reach on top of the roof! Drum isn't going to be able to get her drums back in time for the Big Zing. While she is feeling sad and wandering through the jungle, Drum hears a fantastic sound coming from the glade. It's a Cajun band and one of the members is making a great clickety-clackety beat with the Cajun triangle. DJ Loose explains that there are no drums in the band because the triangle does the drum's job by tapping out the beat of the music. Guest performers: Petite et la Gross
31	5	"Auntie Dot's Special Show"	Richard Bradley	David Collier	22 October 2010
Todd's Auntie Dot is spending the evening on ZingZilla Island so Panzee has organised a special show for her. There will be songs by the ZingZillas plus a special act by the Moaning Stones, Granite and Gravel. Todd is master of ceremonies and quickly starts the show with a whack on his big gong - everyone, including Auntie Dot, shakes. Panzee desperately wants the show to be perfect but is already worried that Todd's over-enthusiastic gonging may spoil it. There is no time to worry though because the ZingZillas are up first. They have all been practising and are all ready so, as the island erupts with fireworks, the ZingZillas rush onto the stage to perform their first song - the 'Rock Guitar' song. Zak plays his 'Rock Broom' throughout and Auntie Dot absolutely loves it. Panzee is thrilled the show started so well but quickly becomes concerned again when Todd does further over-enthusiastic whacks on his gong whilst introducing Granite and Gravel's mango-blowing act. They have to try and blow a mango into the back of a football net. Granite goes first and his gentle blow rolls the mango into the back of the net. Gravel, however, gives a massively powerful blow and not only blows the net away but also blows Auntie Dot off her chair. The show is otherwise going really well and with only one song left, Panzee is confident that nothing can go wrong - until Auntie Dot requests a performance by her favourite nephew Todd.
32	6	"Aloha Flower"	Tom Poole	Jessica Sandys-Clarke	25 October 2010
Zak offers to look after DJ Loose's aloha flower for the day. So DJ explains that an aloha flower needs two things, plenty of shade and plenty of water to keep it healthy. Zak takes the aloha flower and leaves it in the shade in the clubhouse, but he forgets to keep it watered. The ZingZillas gather in the glade to hear Beats of Polynesia, a Hawaiian group. Meanwhile, the sun has moved and as it shines directly on the flower, the flower wilts. DJ is due to get back soon, so in a panic Zak snatches up the aloha flower and dashes off to hide it. He hides the flower, but Todd discovers it. Todd persuades Zak to water the aloha flower. Zak does so, and it immediately starts to perk up. Zak remembers that was the other rule! Keep it watered! He dashes back to the coconut hut with the aloha flower just as DJ arrives. Guest performers: Polynesian Beats
33	7	"The Golden Coconut"	Richard Bradley	Dominic Macdonald	26 October 2010
Having seen a full-size orchestra in the Glade, the ZingZillas return to the Coconut Hut to compete against each other in the Big Quiz. The winner will win the Golden Coconut. Todd is the question master and the Beach Byrds are his able assistants. The questions are on the four sections of the orchestra - strings, woodwind, brass and percussion. Guest performers: BBC Concert Orchestra, Ben Foster
34	8	"Banana Blues"	Helen Scott	Tony Reed	27 October 2010
It is early in the morning and Zak is still fast asleep. DJ Loose introduces Tang, Panzee and Drum to Stuart Zender, who is playing slap bass guitar. The ZingZillas love the tappy, slappy sound, and DJ explains the technique is called slap bass because of the way you slap the guitar strings with your thumb. With a bit of practice, Panzee plays slap bass too and she cannot wait to play it to Zak. However, Zak is very upset because his special breakfast banana has gone missing, and he thinks someone has eaten it. All he found was a banana skin with no banana in it. He declares that he cannot write anything for the Big Zing until he finds out who ate his banana. Todd likes nothing more than a good mystery, so he suggests they look for some clues. However, all the clues they find appear to point to Zak, so they decide to lay a trap to catch the culprit. Guest performer: Stuart Zender
35	9	"Tang's Photo Album"	Richard Bradley	Dominic Macdonald	28 October 2010
It is the Big Day Off on ZingZilla Island. There's no Big Zing so Panzee decides to go and play on the beach, Drum decides to play in the jungle and Zak decides to have a sleep in the clubhouse. Tang can't decide what to do, so DJ Loose suggests that Tang could put photos of all the guests who have played in the glade in his photo album. Tang thinks this is a great idea and decides to call it My Favourite Musicians. But which were his favourites? He can't decide. He asks the others and they recall their favourite performances. Tang still can't decide on his favourite. Gravel and Granite explain that they have had nothing to do all day and they want the ZingZillas to sing a Big Zing. But there is no special guest. Drum says that the ZingZillas are special and they all agree that the ZingZillas can be their own special guests! Guest performers: Verena Menichellui & Angus Cruickshank, Dame Evelyn Glenny, Sarah Connolly & BBC Concert Orchestra, Petite et la Gross
36	10	"Music Box"	Helen Scott	Simon Davies	29 October 2010
Drum discovers a small wooden box washed up on the beach. The other ZingZillas are really intrigued by the box. They open it up and inside there is a ballerina wearing a pink tutu - it's a music box. When Drum winds the box up, beautiful twirly music plays and the ballerina turns around. It makes Drum want to dance too, so Panzee finds her a tutu to wear. DJ introduces Tang to the sounds of the celeste. Drum and Todd hear the music drifting through the jungle and rush to the glade to investigate. Drum instinctively starts dancing again and they realise they've found just the sound they need for the Big Zing. When they rehearse for the Big Zing though their own ZingZilla sound doesn't sound quite right. With Drum dancing they need to find someone else to play drums. Guest performer: Roderick Elms
37	11	"Panzee's Poorly Knee"	Dominic Macdonald	James Reid	29 November 2010
Panzee wants to sing lead vocals in the Big Zing for once, and Zak thinks that is a great idea. In the glade, the ZingZillas watch BJ Cole play the pedal steel guitar. They all love the sad sound of country music. Afterwards, Panzee isn't looking where she is going and she trips on a tree stump and hurts her knee. When she gets back to the clubhouse the others decide she needs to sit down and take the weight off her knee. Zak and Tang go to and ask DJ for advice, while Drum stays in the clubhouse to nurse Panzee. Todd tells Panzee she must rest for a while, but has an idea on how to get her to the Big Zing in time. Guest performer: B.J. Cole
38	12	"The Red Button"	Helen Scott	Dominic Macdonald	30 November 2010
Todd is playing skittles in the garden and, having knocked them all over, he is keen to show Drum his new invention, which will automatically stand the skittles back up. All he has to do is press the big red button. However, when he does so Drum sits down and the skittles don't move. Todd realises that he has invented a sitting down machine rather than a standing up machine. Drum thinks the machine is great fun, and while Todd's back is turned, she rushes off to have some fun with it around the island. They head to the glade, where they watch Matt Gooderson playing keyboards and making many sounds and music with many switches and buttons. Drum loves it and wants to press buttons to make sounds in the Big Zing. Todd rushes off to invent something with sound-making buttons on it. Guest performer: Matt Gooderson
39	13	"Trombone Trouble"	Tom Poole	Anna Starkey	1 December 2010
The ZingZillas hear a cool new sound coming from the glade and go to check it out. DJ Loose introduces them to Chris Lowe, who is playing the trombone. Zak loves the sound it makes and thinks the way it slides up and down is really cool. Zak decides he'd like to play the trombone. Luckily the trombonist lends him his spare trombone and DJ tells him to take good care of it. However, Zak and Panzee get so excited about having a go on the trombone they end up pulling it apart. Neither of them realises that the slide is meant to come off and think they have broken it. Instead of telling the truth to Tang and Drum, Zak hides the broken trombone in a bush and tells them he's given it back to the trombonist to polish. Guest performer: Chris Lowe
40	14	"Panzee's Wish Stall"	Richard Bradley	Dominic Macdonald	2 December 2010
Zak wishes he could balance a banana on the end of his nose. Tang thinks he should sing about wishes in the Wish Song, which is their Big Zing song. The band rehearse. It is thirsty work and, casually rubbing her ear, Panzee wishes she had a drink. Just then Todd calls up with a tray of drinks for the ZingZillas. Zak and Tang are astonished - Panzee can make wishes come true just by rubbing her ear! Panzee decides she is going to make everyone on the island's wishes come true and she heads off. In a jungle clearing nearby, Panzee sets up a wish stall but she discovers that she can't actually make wishes come true. Zak can't balance a banana on his nose, Drum doesn't get a second Yapple and Tang isn't turned into a butterfly. Guest performer: Zhou Jinyan
41	15	"Cinema Day"	Tom Poole; Richard Bradley	Dominic Macdonald	3 December 2010
The ZingZillas have decided to take the day off and visit the cinema. Drum doesn't know what a cinema is. The others explain it is a place where you go to see your favourite films. However, Granite and Gravel are worried - if the ZingZillas are spending the day at the cinema who is going to play the Big Zing? Meanwhile, the ZingZillas have gone into the jungle, found the cinema and are ready to watch the film. Todd, the projectionist, tells them they are going to watch their favourite Big Zings. Todd presses the remote, there is a loud explosion and the projector blows up! They can't watch any more films, but DJ appears with a solution.
42	16	"Salsa Dip"	Tom Poole	Bar Ben-Yossef	6 December 2010
Panzee is very keen to find a good costume to wear for the Big Zing. In the glade, the ZingZillas watch La Cuba Ritmo, a salsa band, perform with two salsa dancers. Panzee falls in love with salsa dancing, and in particular the salsa girl's yellow costume and bright yellow necklace. She is determined to dance in the Big Zing. In the Clubhouse, the ZingZillas rehearse a salsa song. However, at the moment that Panzee is supposed to dance, all she does is fall over. Tang suggests that she needs to practise but Panzee doesn't listen. Todd persuades Panzee to be his partner, but only if she practises. Guest performers: La Cuba Ritmo
43	17	"Making a Choice"	Helen Scott	Matt Brito	7 December 2010
The ZingZillas listen to Jonathan Mayer who is playing the sitar. They love the way the strings make a bendy sound and Drum suggests they create a sitar Big Zing. The stories in his comic have given Zak many ideas, but he can't decide which one to sing about. Todd can't decide what to paint. Over at the coconut hut, Tang and Panzee can't decide what drink to have either and back in the clubhouse Zak still can't decide what to sing about. They realise they should sing all about making choices - after all, they've had difficulty choosing all day! Guest performer: Jonathan Mayer
44	18	"The Hairy Diggle"	Dominic Macdonald	Alexandra Owen	8 December 2010
The ZingZillas find out that taking care of a pet isn't as easy as it may seem - especially when it keeps on squeaking. Maybe the beautiful sound of Nicola Benedetti playing violin can help them. Guest performer: Nicola Benedetti
45	19	"The Singing Bowl"	Helen Scott	Katie Simmons	9 December 2010
The ZingZillas are practicing the High Notes and Low Notes Song. Zak sings all the low parts and Panzee sings the high part. But she can't reach the highest note. Panzee realises that she can't sing the high note. Downstairs in Todd's garden Panzee suddenly hears a very high note coming from the jungle. It is the perfect note for the song, but where is it coming from? Drum races off to find out. Meanwhile Zak and Tang sit with Drum in the glade and watch Frank Perry play notes by tapping bowls around him. It is the perfect sound for the Big Zing. Back in the jungle, Todd gets out his Noise-A-Tron - a device that detects which direction a sound is coming from. Guest performer: Frank Perry
46	20	"Todd's Little Helper"	Dominic Macdonald	Alison Stewart	10 December 2010
With the help of the sounds of the bassoon, Zak, Tang, Panzee and Todd search ZingZilla Island for a strange little creature known only as the Drumbaloola. They soon discover that the Drumbaloola looks very familiar! Guest performer: Karen Geoghegan
47	21	"Home"	Richard Bradley	Mike James	13 December 2010
DJ Loose reminisces about how he used to go on tour when he was in a band. He explains that going on tour is a bit like going on holiday. Panzee and Zak think the ZingZillas should go on tour too. As luck has it there is ship about to leave the bay and so they had better get a move on. They love the idea of leaving the island and even decide to do the Big Zing on the boat. They rush back to the clubhouse to tell the others. But Tang is none too thrilled about going on tour - he thinks he will really miss his island home. Guest performer: Michael Messer
48	22	"Pirate Day"	Tom Poole	Peter Hynes	14 December 2010
It's Pirate Day on the island, and Zak has accidentally buried Panzee's new pirate hat and forgotten where it's buried. Will they find it before the last coconut? Panzee won't dance in the Big Zing without it! Guest performers: The Hornpipers featuring Robert Harbron, Miranda Rutter & Laurel Swift
49	23	"Pom Pom"	Dominic Macdonald	Bernard Krichefski	15 December 2010
Drum's imaginary friend Pom Pom starts to boss everybody around and stops the ZingZillas from rehearsing for the Big Zing. What can Panzee, Zak and Tang do about Pom Pom without upsetting Drum? Guest performers: Ebony Steelband Trust
50	24	"Where's the Bug?"	Tom Poole	Simon Nicholson	16 December 2010
After hearing the beautiful music of the waterphone played by Dame Evelyn Glennie, Tang searches the jungle for his very own amazing new sound for the totally jungle Big Zing. Guest performer: Dame Evelyn Glennie
51	25	"DJ Loose's Radio Show"	Helen Scott; Tom Poole; Richard Bradley	Dominic Macdonald	17 December 2010
DJ Loose introduces a very special show. It's the DJ Loose Radio Show - his very own show, with music, jokes, dancing and much fun.
52	26	"Let It Snow"	Helen Scott	David Collier	24 December 2010
It's Christmas on ZingZilla Island, and Zak promises to make it snow for Drum - but how do you make it snow on a hot and tropical island? Guest performer: ACM Gospel Choir

=== Series 3 (2011–2012) ===
No. overall	No. in series	Title	Directed by	Written by	Original release date
53	1	"Thunder and Lightning"	Michael Towner	Mike James	21 November 2011
The ZingZillas wake up and ask Todd for an idea for the day's song. Todd uses his ideas machine, but it breaks down. Instead of an idea, it starts to make rumbling and crashing sounds. Drum thinks it sounds like thunder and lightning. The ZingZillas think this is a brilliant idea for the song. In the glade, Panzee and Zak see Colin Currie, a percussionist, playing the timpani and the thunder sheet. These will be great instruments for the thunder-and-lightning song. The ZingZillas gather together in the clubhouse to rehearse their new song. Just at the crashiest, bashiest moment, Drum breaks her cymbal. Now she can't make any crashy-bashy noises in the Big Zing! Zak decides that they need a banana break. Zak brings in a tray of bananas, which Drum accidentally knocks over. The tray makes a crashy-bashy noise on the floor and Drum realises that it's the perfect thing to replace her broken cymbal. The ZingZillas are ready to play! Guest performer: Colin Currie
54	2	"Disco Lights"	Michael Towner	Alexandra Owen	22 November 2011
The ZingZillas wake up and ask Todd for an idea for the day's song. Todd uses his ideas machine but it sends all the lights crazy and they start flashing. The ZingZillas wonder how they can possibly practise the Big Zing with all those lights flashing. In the glade, Panzee watches the Manchester Disco Crew dance to disco music. She loves it and notices that the flashing lights really suit disco music. That gives her an idea for the day's song. The ZingZillas gather together in the clubhouse to rehearse their new song. The lights are still flashing but the ZingZillas don't mind now. It suits their new disco song - Disco Lights. It's a great song and the ZingZillas are all ready to play the Big Zing. Nothing can go wrong! Guest performers: Manchester Disco Crew
55	3	"Panzee, I'm Sorry"	Michael Towner	Alexandra Owen	23 November 2011
The ZingZillas wake up and ask Todd for an idea for the day's song. Todd uses his ideas machine but it breaks down as usual. Todd keeps saying sorry. Tang wonders if it is a good thing to say sorry. Zak boasts that he never says sorry because he’s never wrong. Then he accidentally steps on Panzee's bass guitar, leaving a big footprint on it. Even though Panzee is upset, Zak is too proud to say sorry and instead he dashes off to the glade. In the glade, Zak watches Simon Mayor play the mandolin. Zak loves the sweet sound of the mandolin and thinks the ZingZillas could write a great song with a mandolin in it. But what can the words of the song be about? Zak, Tang and Drum gather together in the clubhouse to rehearse their new song. Panzee is still cross and has disappeared off to the beach on her own. Zak realises that perhaps he shouldn't have been so rude to Panzee. He realises he needs to make it up to Panzee for stepping on her bass. He decides that the new song should be about apologising. So for the first time Zak sings the magic words 'I'm sorry'. Panzee is sat on the beach, still feeling upset. Zak joins her and starts to sing his song Panzee, I'm Sorry. Panzee loves the song and is won over when Zak presents her with her bass guitar, all cleaned and ready to be played. They rush off the beach together to play the Big Zing - friends again. Guest performer: Simon Mayor
56	4	"Catch That Beat"	Michael Towner	Bar Ben-Yossef	24 November 2011
The ZingZillas wake up and ask Todd for an idea for the day's song. Todd uses his ideas machine but it doesn't want to work and the paper gets jammed. When Todd tries to get the paper out, he falls over. Panzee decides she'd better try the glade for an idea. In the glade, Panzee watches Dance Off Crew doing some street dancing. They make up their own dance moves, spinning, tumbling and jumping. Panzee loves them so much she invents her own street dance move, the Winning Spinning. That gives her an idea for the day's song. The ZingZillas gather together in the clubhouse to rehearse Panzee's street dance song. Zak and Drum both demonstrate cool dance moves and then they play their new song Catch That Beat. After they have practised the song, they ask Tang which cool dance he is going to do. But he can't think of one. What are they going to do? If Tang doesn't come up with a street dance move, they won't be able to perform the Big Zing. The ZingZillas all scratch their heads, trying to come up with a solution. Then Panzee gets it! She watches Tang scratching and realises that scratching could be a really cool dance move - especially if you do it in an orangutan-type way. So Tang tries out the scratching move and it works! Now the ZingZillas are ready to play. Guest performers: DanceOff Crew
57	5	"Giddyup and Go"	Michael Towner	Alexandra Owen	25 November 2011
The ZingZillas wake up and ask Todd for an idea for the day's song. Todd uses his ideas machine but it starts to shake. When he tries to stop it shaking, he holds it by a pair of reins. Drum laughs as she thinks it looks like Todd is riding a horse! The others think that riding horses is a good idea for a song. Zak's pretend horse will be the fastest, Panzee's will be the most beautiful and Tang's will be the cleverest. Drum wants hers to make clippity clop noises - but she doesn't want them to be pretend noises. She wants them to be real. In the glade, Andrew Budden plays the French horn. Its hunting horn type sound is perfect for a song about horses! The ZingZillas gather together in the clubhouse to rehearse their new song Giddy Up and Go! They love playing the song and pretending to ride horses. But when they stop playing, they notice Drum is still sad. She wants to make real clippity cloppity noises! What can the ZingZillas do? While she is watching the coconut fall, Panzee has an idea. She dashes off to the Moaning Stones Beach and borrows two-halves of a spare coconut. She brings them back to the clubhouse and gives them to Drum. Now Drum can make clippity cloppity noises and the ZingZillas are ready to play! Guest performer: Andrew Budden
58	6	"On the Drums"	Michael Towner	Bar Ben-Yossef	28 November 2011
Zak wants to sing a song that names all the ZingZillas' instruments, but Drum has so many drums with different names, Zak can't remember them all. Drums sees Cherisse Osei in the glade. But then back at the clubhouse the ZingZillas tease Drum with the Fuzzy and Lily guitar; it is then that Drum says she wants proper names, or she won't play the Big Zing - which turns the big problem into a disaster. Then Zak has an idea to help him remember - the snare and toms are drums to beat, and the hats and crash are cymbals to hit. Now they are ready to play! Guest performer: Cherisse Osei
59	7	"Pause for a Moment"	Michael Towner	Adam Redfern	29 November 2011
The ZingZillas ask Todd for an idea for the day's song. Todd uses his ideas machine but it takes too long for Zak. He wants it to work faster! Suddenly he has a brilliant idea. They can play a song about being fast. Before others have a chance to say anything Zak dashes off to the glade. Fast. In the glade, Zak sees Bogdan Văcărescu playing the violin - really fast. This appeals to Zak. As soon as Bogdan has finished playing Zak dashes back to the clubhouse to practise his faster faster faster song. The ZingZillas gather together in the clubhouse to rehearse Zak's song. Each time they try to play it Zak wants them to play it faster and faster. Eventually they play it so fast that they can't keep up and they have to start all over again. Zak tells them they just need practise. The others think Zak is being too fast. Zak carries on getting faster and faster. Eventually he is jumping around so much he wears himself out and flops down on a beanbag. It doesn't look like he can carry on - and if Zak can't sing the song there'll be no Big Zing! Panzee comes up with the solution. Zak needs to pause for a moment. So Zak takes deep breaths and does what Panzee says. In a few moments he starts to feel better. He realises that you can't be fast all the time, sometimes you have to pause for a moment. The ZingZillas now have a great idea for the song and they have a lead singer who isn't exhausted. They're ready to play! Guest performer: Bogdan Vacarescu
60	8	"Beatbox"	Michael Towner	Bar Ben-Yossef	30 November 2011
The ZingZillas wake up and ask Todd for an idea for the day's song. But Todd's TV doesn't seem to be working properly and it keeps going wrong - making Todd sound like he is stuttering and stumbling. Although Todd can't actually communicate with them, the ZingZillas like the beat of Todd's bumpy speech and they wonder if they should do a song that has bumpy beats in it for the Big Zing. In the glade, Tang sees Bellatrix, a beatboxer, performing a beatbox song. Bellatrix makes all the beaty noises with her mouth. Tang is inspired to write a beatboxing song. The ZingZillas gather together in the clubhouse to rehearse the beatboxing song. Drum is feeling naughty and she hides under a pile of clothes and sneaks out before the band start. So Zak, Tang and Panzee rehearse without her. The beatboxing song is a great success but the ZingZillas realise that they need their drummer to play the Big Zing. Where has she gone? Guest performer: Bellatrix
61	9	"Sunshine"	Michael Towner	Denise Cassar	1 December 2011
The ZingZillas wake up and ask Todd for an idea for the day's song. But Todd is feeling sad. He has promised to grow Granite and Gravel a sunflower. He planted a seed in a pot but it will never grow in time for the Big Zing and Granite and Gravel will be sad. The ZingZillas decide they need to cheer Granite and Gravel up. In the glade, Panzee sees Jali Nyonkoling Kuyateh playing an African harp called the Kora. Panzee wonders if the kora will give her any ideas for cheering up Gravel and Granite. The kora plays, and its sweet tinkling sunshiney sounds do give Panzee an idea. She dashes back to the clubhouse to see the others. The ZingZillas gather together in the clubhouse to rehearse Panzee's Sunshine Song. It is a really beautiful song. The ZingZillas think it is so beautiful it is bound to cheer Granite and Gravel up. Guest performer: Jali Nyonkoling Kuyateh
62	10	"ZingZilla Rock 'n' Rollin'"	Michael Towner	Simon Davies	2 December 2011
The ZingZillas wake up and ask Todd for an idea for the day's song. But Todd's machine is not much help. It keeps rocking and rolling all over the place. Tang has a brilliant idea. There's a type of music called rock 'n' roll - the ZingZillas can play a rock 'n' roll song! They ask Todd if he would like to dance to the song but sadly Todd has to say no. He has hurt his foot rolling a rock and has to sit down. All he can do is clap hands, wiggle his fingers and wave. The ZingZillas feel very sorry for him. In the glade, Zak sees Feets of Amazement - a rock 'n' roll dance group. They do a dance called the jive to rock 'n' roll music. Zak thinks they look brilliant and are perfect for the ZingZillas rock 'n' roll song. He dashes back to the others. The ZingZillas gather together in the clubhouse to play ZingZilla Rock 'n' Rollin'. The ZingZillas want Todd to jive to their rock 'n' roll song but he can't dance because of his bandaged foot - what are they going to do? Panzee really wants Todd to play in the Big Zing. Tang points out that all Todd can do is clap hands, wiggle his fingers and wave. Then Zak comes up with a brilliant solution - that's all Todd needs to do! Todd can handjive! They play the song again and Todd quickly learns how to handjive. Now they are all ready for the Big Zing. Guest performers: Feets Of Amazement
63	11	"To the Beat of a Drum"	Michael Towner	Simon Davies	5 December 2011
The ZingZillas wake up and ask Todd for an idea for the day's song. However, Todd's machine isn't working properly and is so noisy that the ZingZillas can't hear what Todd is saying. He explains that he has to tie the belt off to the arch and the ZingZillas think he is saying he needs them to 'march'. This gets them thinking about a marching song. But what sort of music is good for a marching song? In the glade, Tang sees the Hertfordshire Showband perform a marching version of When the Saints Go Marching In. Tang loves their uniforms and the way they can march around with their instruments. He dashes back to the others. The ZingZillas gather together in the clubhouse to practise their marching song To the Beat of a Drum. It is a brilliant song to march to and Tang, Panzee and Zak are soon marching around the clubhouse to the music. But Drum is sad. She can't march around because she has no way of carrying her drum and playing it at the same time. This is a problem! Tang wonders how Drum can belt out a beat. This gives Zak an idea and he rushes off to see Todd. Todd won't let Zak have his spare belt from the arch because the machine will fall apart, so he decides the only belt is from his trousers. Zak thinks it will be perfect for Drum to carry her drum and play it at the same time (apart from the trousers falling down from Todd without the trouser-belt). Now they are ready to play! Guest performers: Hertfordshire Showband
64	12	"Brush Your Teeth"	Michael Towner	Simon Davies	6 December 2011
The ZingZillas wake up and ask Todd for an idea for a song. But when they switch the TV on, Todd is not there! Suddenly he dashes into shot. He has been in the bathroom brushing his teeth. The ZingZillas love brushing their teeth and they decide that they want to sing a Brush Your Teeth song. Drum already has her toothbrush ready! The others tell her to keep it safe. In the glade, Zak and Tang watch Peter Moss play the banjolele. Although it is a little instrument, it makes a big sound and they love its fun furious music. It will be perfect for the Brush Your Teeth song. The ZingZillas gather together in the clubhouse to play Brush Your Teeth. It's a song about how much fun it is to brush your teeth! The ZingZillas love it and are really excited about playing it in the Big Zing. They think they are ready, until Drum discovers that she has lost her toothbrush - and she won't perform without it, not until they help her find it just in time for the Big Zing. Now she's ready to play the song with her toothbrush! Guest performer: Peter Moss
65	13	"Let's Play"	Michael Towner	Uncredited	7 December 2011
The ZingZillas wake up and ask Todd for an idea for the day's song. They are worried that the machine might break down. Todd is sure things will be fine. Drum wants to play on the beach. Todd starts the machine up and it breaks down. Todd suggests they go and play on the beach, and Panzee has a brilliant idea - why don't they write a Let's Play song for the Big Zing? The ZingZillas love this plan and rush off to the beach. On the beach, the ZingZillas start to play their song. Tang strums his guitar, Panzee plays her keyboard, Drum bangs her drums and Zak sings his vocals. DJ Loose loves their new song! The ZingZillas really love their Let's Play song and Panzee thinks they should do actions too. But the ZingZillas can't do actions because they are playing their instruments, so who can do the actions? Drum comes up with a solution - The ZingBoppers! The ZingBoppers run into the glade, where they are greeted by DJ Loose. DJ Loose starts to teach them the moves to the song. After the third coconut falls, the ZingBoppers practise the song with the ZingZillas accompanying them from the beach. After the practice, everyone is ready to play the Big Zing.
66	14	"Listen to the Wind"	Michael Towner	Alexandra Owen	8 December 2011
The ZingZillas wake up and ask Todd for an idea for the day's song. But Todd is sitting down in his cave. It is too hot! Luckily Todd has a fan going to keep him cool. The ZingZillas wish they could keep cool too. Panzee suggests they write a wind song - that might keep them cool. In the glade, Panzee sees Guo Yue play the Chinese bamboo flute. Its gentle whispery sound reminds Panzee of listening to the wind. She thinks it is a great instrument for the Big Zing and rushes back to tell the others. The ZingZillas gather together in the clubhouse to play Listen to the Wind. They aren't feeling quite as hot now because Zak has borrowed Todd's fan and Tang is stretched out on a chair keeping cool. They sing and play Listen to the Wind. It's a great success. Zak thinks that having the fan around means nothing can go wrong. Just then, the fan blows Zak's lyrics out of his hand and they fly out of the door and into the jungle. Without his words Zak can't sing the Big Zing! The ZingZillas don't know what to do! Just then they hear Granite calling to them from across the Island. Maybe he will be able to help. Zak dashes off to the Moaning Stones Beach. At the beach he finds Granite with the lyrics - stuck to his nose! Zak laughs at how funny he looks but he is also very grateful to Granite for finding his words. Now the ZingZillas are ready to play! Guest performer: Guo Yue
67	15	"Panzee's Family Show"	Michael Towner	Denise Cassar	9 December 2011
Todd tells the ZingZillas about his special megaphone announcement - it's show-time! But every time he says it, the machine breaks down. This give Panzee an idea. Panzee wants to put on an all singing, all tap-dancing family show. DJ Loose introduces the BBC Big Band and the Manchester Rhythm Tap in the glade. Panzee thinks it will be perfect for her family show. But then after a practice, Zak breaks his microphone in his happy attempt and doesn't know how he will sing in the Big Zing. This is a big problem - which in other words is a disaster! But luckily after another call from Todd, Drum notices that Todd's megaphone is not only for making announcements but also perfect for Zak's singing. Panzee's family show has been saved, just in time for the Big Zing! Guest performers: BBC Big Band & Manchester Rhythm Tap
68	16	"Cooking in the Kitchen"	Michael Towner	Uncredited	23 January 2012
Todd is too busy cooking to help the ZingZillas with a song idea. Zak has a simple idea - he needs a spoon, a cooker, big pots, little pots, long wooden spoons, many bowls, etc. - which doesn't satisfy Panzee. Tang and Drum suggest they pretend to be cooking. But they need moves as they only play instruments so, together with DJ Loose, they enlist the help of the Zingboppers to create actions for a song called Cooking in the Kitchen.
69	17	"Like a Firefly"	Michael Towner	Mike James	24 January 2012
Todd with trouble finding the ZingZillas with fireflies in the way says that today's Big Zing will be at night. But the machine isn't much help as Panzee predicts. So she and Drum visit the glade where DJ Loose introduces them to Simone Rebello playing the glockenspiel. Zak is struggling to think of words for a twinkly lights song. The dressing up box releases a sudden flurry of fireflies which helps the ZingZillas find the right words for their song. Guest performer: Simone Rebello
70	18	"Tiny or Tall"	Michael Towner	Iwan Watson	25 January 2012
Drum isn't too happy at being called tiny, but a recorder group with instruments of differing sizes makes her see that size doesn't matter. Guest performers: Fontanella
71	19	"It's Fun to Be a One Man Band"	Michael Towner	Denise Cassar	26 January 2012
DJ Loose introduces us to Chucklefoot as the one-man band. After they watch a one-man band perform in the glade, Drum and all the Zingzillas' instruments go missing. Can Zak track them down in time for the Big Zing? Later, he manages to see them in the jungle, where he thinks he already has the one man band, so it isn't as easy as Drum thinks. Now they are ready to play! Guest performer: Chucklefoot
72	20	"Granite's Glasses"	Michael Towner	Uncredited	27 January 2012
DJ Loose presides over another edition of the DJ Loose Radio Show. Gravel thinks Granite needs glasses to see better, but first the first coconut falls and they have fun with ZingZilla Rock 'n' Rollin'. Now Granite has glasses, which makes Gravel think Granite might miss the next coconut but manage to see it fall. DJ has a letter from Granite saying that his favourite Big Zing's is Thunder and Lightning and he is the one in the smart glasses. What a triumph, he says. But after the third coconut falls, the glasses itch Granite's nose, which leads them about to make him sneeze. Everyone minus Granite. say "Uh oh!", as it is a disaster. Granite sneezes loudly, but that impacts the glasses to fly out of him and past DJ, and are out of sight with a crash. Granite is now fine without them, so the ZingZillas play their last favourite Big Zing “Catch That Beat". Guest performers: Feets Of Amazement, Colin Currie, DanceOff Crew
73	21	"I'll Grow Flowers for You"	Michael Towner	Mike James	30 January 2012
Panzee decides that she needs a new flower for her hair. The ZingZillas get an idea to play a flower song for the Big Zing. Guest performers: Bauler Ganer Dol
74	22	"Orangutango"	Michael Towner	Denise Cassar	31 January 2012
Drum wants Tang to dance a tango with her in the Big Zing, but Tang insists that he can't dance. Guest performers: Tango Siempre with Alex and Giraldo
75	23	"My Lazy Afternoon"	Michael Towner	Simon Davies	1 February 2012
The ZingZillas have a lazy, dreamy song to play with Jenny Galloway, their favourite oboe player. But they have lost Tang - where can he be? Without him, the Big Zing will be cancelled. But eventually they see him laying down in the warm sunshine. Now they have found him in time to play the Big Zing! Guest performer: Jenny Galloway
76	24	"Chugging on a Train"	Michael Towner	Mike James	2 February 2012
The ZingZillas have a swinging train song to sing, so DJ introduces us to the BBC Big Band playing a train-sort of tune, but Panzee and Zak can't agree who is going to be the driver of the train - whether "choo-choo" or "whoo-whoo!". If they don't settle their argument there'll be no Big Zing! But they manage to sort it out with Zak in the leading saying choo-choo and Panzee in the lead saying whoo-whoo! They're now ready to play! Guest performers: BBC Big Band
77	25	"Shake It"	Michael Towner	Bar Ben-Yossef	3 February 2012
It's carnival time on ZingZilla Island. Rhythms of the City, a Brazilian Samba band, are playing and dancing in the Big Zing. The ZingZillas have a fabulous song but Panzee can't decide what to wear. Guest performers: Rhythms of the City
78	26	"Counting the Pennies"	Michael Towner	Uncredited	6 February 2012
The ZingZillas were having another edition of the DJ Loose Radio Show until Granite says one announcement to make: when he gets a job in a bank counting pennies, it leaves Gravel all alone on the beach. He has no choice but to count coconuts all on his own. Guest performers: BBC Big Band, Cherisse Osei, Herfordshire Showband

=== Series 4 (2012) ===
No. overall	No. in series	Title	Directed by	Written by	Original release date
79	1	"Electric Guitar"	Iwan Watson	Dominic Macdonald	23 April 2012
Dan and Justin Hawkins visit the island - they are electric guitar players and the sound they make is really noisy! Zak is thrilled by this. DJ explains that electric guitars are loud so that they can play in large places. Justin and Dan play and Zak and Tang love it. They dash back to compose an electric guitar song. Back at the clubhouse, Drum, Zak and Tang play a very noisy electric guitar song. Poor Panzee has to put her hands over her ears because it is so noisy. Zak shouts that it is supposed to be noisy, but Panzee says it hurts her ears. Can Tang think of a way to make everyone happy in time for the Big Zing? Guest performers: Justin & Dan Hawkins
80	2	"New Banana Car"	Michael Towner	Tony Reed	24 April 2012
DJ introduces Urban Strawberry Lunch, who play instruments made up of bits and pieces of old cars that they have found. Drum loves the percussive sound of the music and dashes back to tell the others. Back at the clubhouse, Zak has various bits and pieces of car that Todd is going to add to his banana car to make it look really cool. The ZingZillas start to improvise a car song. Drum starts with a drum beat and the others join in - hitting the various car parts that Zak has been playing with. They are all really looking forward to the Big Zing until Todd explains that he won't be able to finish Zak's car in time. Zak is horrified - he can't sing the Big Zing without his banana car! Guest performers: Urban Strawberry Lunch
81	3	"Spread the Word"	Iwan Watson	Dominic Macdonald	25 April 2012
When the ZingZillas try to ask Todd for an idea for a song, they find that he is fast asleep. They bang on the door and ring him on the banana phone, but he doesn't wake up. Zak dashes off to the glade to get some inspiration for their song, while the others try to think of a way of waking Todd up. DJ introduces Melanie Oesch - she is a yodeller from Switzerland. She yodels for Zak, who absolutely loves the sound she is making. Zak dashes back to tell the others. Back at the clubhouse, Drum is banging a pot, trying to wake Todd up, but she can't - he is fast asleep. Panzee says they need to make their voices heard, and this gives Zak an idea for a song called Spread the Word. It's a song about all the different ways of communicating, and Zak yodels in the middle. The ZingZillas rehearse the song, and it is great! But when they check on Todd, he is still fast asleep. It looks like there's nothing that will wake him up in time for the Big Zing! Guest performer: Melanie Oesch
82	4	"Never Mind"	Iwan Watson	Colin Dallibar	26 April 2012
Zak and Panzee's arguing gets too much for Drum and Tang, so they decide to leave them to it and go to the glade, where DJ introduces the Grimethorpe Colliery Band - a brass band. Tang and Drum love them. The sound is so warm and friendly. Back at the clubhouse, Zak and Panzee are still arguing when Tang and Drum return. When Zak announces that he will not be playing in the Big Zing, Panzee says that neither will she. They fold their arms, refusing to budge. Tang and Drum have a problem on their hands. Can they convince Zak and Panzee to talk through their problems in time for the Big Zing? Guest performers: The Grimethorpe Colliery Band
83	5	"You Need a Hat"	Michael Towner	Colin Dallibar	27 April 2012
Todd's ideas machine stops working and Todd realises he is going to have to put his thinking hat on. He looks round for his thinking hat, but it has gone. Panzee suggests that while Todd looks for his hat, they should write a hat song. DJ introduces Mariachi El Mexicano. They play mariachi music and wear large-brimmed Mexican hats. Tang thinks this will be perfect music for their hat song. Back at the clubhouse, Zak tries to come up with lyrics for the hat song. The other ZingZillas offer up a list of different hats - bonnets, boaters, bobble hats, berets and balaclavas. Soon Zak has loads of hat ideas for the hat song, but Todd still hasn't found his thinking hat. Guest performers: Mariachi El Mexicano
84	6	"You Can Really Do It If You Try"	Michael Towner	Alexandra Owen	30 April 2012
Todd is busy getting ready for the annual hairy diggle race, so Tang suggests they should write a race day Big Zing. In the glade, DJ introduces Bond, a string quartet. They play a very fast piece that Tang thinks would make a wonderful accompaniment for a song about racing. In the clubhouse, Drum is sad because she doesn't think her hairy diggle will win the race. Zak is sure his will win, like it does every year. Panzee tries to cheer Drum up by telling her that she can really do it if she tries. Tang thinks this is a great lyric for the song, so the ZingZillas practice their race song, You Can Really Do It if You Try. Back in the glade, the race is about to start. Drum quietly sings You Can Really Do It if You Try to her diggle. The ZingZillas watch their hairy diggles race off into the jungle and over to the beach where Todd is at the finish line. A diggle whizzes over the line - but which one is it? Guest performers: Bond
85	7	"The Little Pigs Saved the Day"	Michael Towner	Dominic Macdonald	1 May 2012
When Todd uses a balloon to hold a lever up on his machine, it gives Panzee an idea for a huffing and puffing song. Drum suggests they sing a song about the three little pigs and the wolf who huffed and puffed and blew their house down. In the glade, DJ introduces Mukul Acharya who plays the harmonium. DJ explains that it has bellows which blow air into it. Tang thinks it is perfect for a huffing and puffing song. Back in the Clubhouse, the ZingZillas gather up and start to play their three little pigs song. It's a great success for the big zing. They are so busy playing it that they don’t notice that the coconut clock is broken and everyone on the island had to blow the third coconut down! Eventually after the third coconut was free, the ZingZillas declared that they’re ready for the Big Zing as the final coconut fell down. Guest performer: Mukul Acharya
86	8	"All the Fun of the Fair"	Iwan Watson	Mike James	2 May 2012
Todd is very excited because it is the day of the Island Fair, and he needs to find some good dancers for it. In the jungle, Panzee and Zak find DJ. DJ introduces them to Boggart's Breakfast who perform morris dancing. They wear blue face make-up and dance with sticks and bells. Zak thinks they look really cool. After they have listened to the morris music, Zak gets very excited about dancing a morris dance. He and Panzee rush off to write the song. The ZingZillas rehearse on the beach. They think of a song while they are listing all the fun things you can do at a fair. Zak wants to dance with bells on his ankles - just like a morris dancer - so Panzee dashes off to see if there are any in the dressing up box. Guest performers: Boggart's Breakfast
87	9	"Flying to the Moon"	Michael Towner	Ayesha Chowdhury	3 May 2012
Todd is busy looking through his new telescope. Zak asks him what a telescope does and Todd explains that you use it to see things in space. This gives the ZingZillas a great idea for a song all about space. Tang wonders how they can make spacey sounds, so Panzee dashes off to the glade for some inspiration. In the glade, DJ introduces Kojo, who plays the synthesiser. Panzee realises that the sounds of the synthesiser are perfect for a song about space. In the clubhouse, Zak is trying to think about words to sing. Tang suggests a song about flying to the moon, so they practice that. The song sounds great, but Zak can't think of any good words. He needs to think of more spacey subjects. Drum suggests he looks through Todd's telescope, but when Zak tries he can't see anything - because it's the middle of the day and telescopes only work well at night. How will he think of words in time for the Big Zing? Guest performer: Kojo
88	10	"Shopping"	Iwan Watson	Dominic Macdonald	4 May 2012
The ZingZillas decide to sing a song about shopping. In the glade, DJ introduces Paul Patrick, who plays the marimba. The marimba sounds very busy and fun - perfect for a song about shopping. Panzee is thrilled and races back to tell the others. Back at the clubhouse, the ZingZillas come up with ideas for their shopping song. They think of many things to buy. They play the song and it sounds great, but at the end Panzee is sad. They have been singing so much about shopping that now she wants to go and do some shopping, and she would really really love to have a seashell necklace - but there are no shops on the island. Guest performer: Paul Patrick
89	11	"Statues"	Michael Towner	Dominic Macdonald	21 May 2012
The ZingZillas wake up and ask Todd for an idea for a song. Todd's ideas machine stops working, and suddenly the picture freezes. Zak thinks Todd looks like a statue, and Panzee says she likes statues - she plays musical statues all the time. Zak says there is no time to play musical statues. In the glade, DJ Loose introduces Sharon Shannon, Jim Murray, Dezi Donnelly, Michael McGoldrick and the North West Celtic Dance Ladies. They play traditional Irish music and dance to it too. Zak thinks that Panzee will love the music. Panzee is getting a little tired being a statue, but she is still determined to be a statue all day. Then Tang has an idea! The Irish dancers will solve the problem! They watch the dancers on the TV. Tang explains that Irish dancers move their legs really fast but they keep their top halves still like statues. If Panzee does some Irish dancing, she can dance and be a statue at the same time. Guest performers: Sharon Shannon, Jim Murray, Dezi Donnelly, Michael McGoldrick & The North West Celtic Dance Ladies
90	12	"Belle of the Ball"	Michael Towner	Dominic Macdonald	22 May 2012
The ZingZillas wake up and ask Todd for an idea for a song. Todd is worried his machine will not work so he decides to use a magic fairy wand. Sadly the wand does not work and Todd's machine does not produce a single idea. However, the wand gives Panzee an idea. She is going to write a song about a magic wand. DJ Loose introduces Bond, a string quartet, who are going to play a waltz. To demonstrate the waltz two dancers in full evening dress dance too. Panzee is thrilled with this. She thinks they look like a fairytale princess and prince. The ZingZillas gather together in the clubhouse. Panzee wants them to play a song about a Princess Belle and Prince Charming waltzing the night away. The song is wonderful. Now all Panzee needs is a magic wand to finish off the story. But the magic wand Todd used is broken. Todd reappears on the screen. He has mended the wand and is ready to make the machine work. Panzee is thrilled Todd has fixed it. Now that the wand is mended she can borrow it and sing the Big Zing. It is time to play! Guest performers: Bond, Tom Malone & Natalie Patel
91	13	"Why Don't You Copy Us Too?"	Michael Towner	Iwan Watson	23 May 2012
The ZingZillas wake up and ask Todd for an idea for a song. Tang presses the button to switch the TV on and Drum copies him by pressing the button again. This has the effect of switching the TV off again - before Todd has had a chance to say anything. When any of the ZingZillas speaks, Drum copies. The others realise that Drum is copying them. It soon gets very annoying and Panzee drags Drum off to the glade to stop her annoying the others. DJ Loose introduces Nuline Dance Cumbria. They are a line dancing team and they dance to country music. When they have finished Panzee decides she wants to do a line dancing song for the Big Zing. Back at the clubhouse the ZingZillas rehearse a line dancing song. It is a good song but Zak cannot think what to call it. As he dances around Drum copies him - which eventually really, really annoys him. The ZingZillas cannot decide what to call their song. Then Panzee has a brilliant idea - as Drum likes copying so much, and line dancing is all about copying then that is what the song should be about - copying! They could call the song Why Don't You Copy Us Too? The ZingZillas all cheer - they are ready to play! Guest performers: Nuline Dance Cumbria
92	14	"Echo on the Island"	Michael Towner	Dominic Macdonald	24 May 2012
The ZingZillas wake up and ask Todd for an idea for a song. Todd's ideas machine does not seem to be working properly and it starts making a noise like an echo. Zak explains to Drum what an echo is and the ZingZillas decide to write a song about echoes. DJ Loose introduces Michele Montolli, who plays the double bass. The sounds he makes echo round the glade and they give Panzee exactly the sound she wants for an echo song. Back at the clubhouse, Panzee dashes in with the good news.The ZingZillas rehearse the echo song called Echo on the Island. When they have finished practising, they all think they have a wonderful song to perform for the Big Zing. Guest performer: Michele Montolli
93	15	"Good to Be Me"	Iwan Watson	Dominic Macdonald	25 May 2012
The ZingZillas turn on the TV and see that Todd is not there. Suddenly the Beach Byrds pop up. They tell the ZingZillas that Todd has gone to the beach to climb trees and collect coconuts. Panzee tells the Beach Byrds to go and have a good climb while the ZingZillas think of a song. The ZingZillas want to sing a song that is all about climbing trees, being happy and free. They start to play the song It's Good To Be Me. As they play the Beach Byrds are on the beach, climbing up a tree. At the end of the song the ZingZillas are very pleased with the results. Tang and Drum have disappeared, leaving Zak and Panzee to try and get the Beach Byrds down from the tree that they have got stuck in. Zak immediately panics, running round and round until he bumps into the tree, dislodging the Beach Byrds. Just then Tang and Drum rush in with a mattress they borrowed from Todd. In the nick of time they place it at the bottom of the tree and the Beach Byrds tumble out of the tree and land safely on the mattress.
94	16	"Hangin' Loose"	Michael Towner	Dominic Macdonald	28 May 2012
It's DJ Loose's birthday! Panzee wonders what DJ would like to do for his birthday and Zak decides to ask DJ himself. DJ says what he really wants to do is sing. Zak knows he can help with that, so he picks DJ up and piggybacks him through the jungle, back to the clubhouse. The ZingZillas rehearse DJ Loose's special birthday song Hangin' Loose - they all play and DJ sings. It's a great song and they are all pleased with it. There is only one thing missing - the ZingBoppers! In the glade, DJ meets up with the ZingBoppers, who agree to dance in his birthday song. Before they can dance, they have to learn the dance moves. DJ teaches them to pretend they're playing the saxophone, the trumpet and the trombone. When the ZingBoppers have practised these moves, DJ thinks they're ready to put them to music - just in time for the Big Zing!
95	17	"Everyone's Different"	Iwan Watson	Dominic Macdonald	29 May 2012
Todd is having trouble with a Beach Byrd in his machine. When it's sorted out, he apologises to the Beach Byrd, whose name is Laverne. Zak is surprised - he didn't know the Beach Byrds had names. Tang explains that everyone is different. The ZingZillas don't have tails except for Drum. Drum is thrilled that she is different. The ZingZillas decide to write a song called Everyone's Different. In the glade, DJ introduces Julian Smith, who plays the soprano saxophone. Panzee is surprised that the saxophone is straight - she thought that saxophones were curved like Laverne's. DJ explains that it may look different but it makes just as beautiful a sound. Panzee listens and agrees. It is the perfect instrument for their song. Panzee rushes into the clubhouse and tells the others all about the soprano sax, which is the same but different. It's perfect for the song! Together, the ZingZillas practise their song. The ZingZillas agree that while they are all different, they're all ready to play - together! Guest performer: Julian Smith
96	18	"Jogging Day"	Iwan Watson	Dominic Macdonald	30 May 2012
The ZingZillas watch two of their favourite Big Zings, and then choose one to end the show with. DJ introduces the first song. It is Electric Guitar, featuring Justin & Dan Hawkins. The next song is Shopping, featuring Paul Patrick on marimba. Meanwhile on the beach, Granite has decided to go jogging. He tears through the glade, ordering everybody and everything to get out of the way while he jogs. Back on the beach, Gravel calls for him to come back - there are coconuts to count! Meanwhile Granite stops at DJ Loose's cabinet he retires from jogging and goes back to Gravel. Guest performers: Justin and Dan Hawkins, Paul Patrick
97	19	"Robotic Beat"	Iwan Watson	Tony Reed	31 May 2012
A problem with the TV inspires Zak to start doing a robot voice, which makes him cough a little. Panzee thinks they should write a song about robots, and everyone agrees this is a brilliant idea. Panzee plays a robotic beat on her keyboard and the rest of the ZingZillas join in with the song, but when Zak starts to sing like a robot he starts to cough again. Back at the clubhouse, Zak tries again. He has a sip of water but it's no good. Every time he makes a robot voice he starts to cough. In the glade, Zak settles down next to DJ. He is sad because he can't sing a robot song in the Big Zing. DJ tries to cheer him up by showing him Rie Fujii who does robotic dancing. When Rie has finished, Zak has a wonderful idea - he won't sing in a robot voice, he'll dance like a robot instead! Guest performer: Rie Fujii
98	20	"Fall Asleep"	Michael Towner	Dominic Macdonald	1 June 2012
It is night on ZingZilla Island. The ZingZillas should be fast asleep, but Drum is awake. She wakes up Tang and asks Tang to tell her a story, so Tang tells Drum the story of how the ZingZillas wrote a lullaby. In the story, Todd's yawning gives Panzee the idea to write a lullaby. In the glade DJ introduces George Panda, an mbira player. The tinkly twinkly sound of the mbira gave Panzee the idea for her song. She hurries off to join the other ZingZillas on the beach. The ZingZillas play their new lullaby, Fall Asleep - it is brilliant and they are all really pleased with it. But the song is so beautiful and so soothing that all the ZingZillas fall asleep! So All the other characters shout 'wake up ZingZillas!' This does the trick and the ZingZillas wake up, just in time for the Big Zing! Guest performer: George Panda
99	21	"Washing Up"	Michael Towner	Tony Reed	4 June 2012
Todd demonstrates a new attachment for his ideas machine that makes it wash dishes, but the machine goes into overdrive, sending foam everywhere. It doesn't look like Todd's dishes are going to get washed at all, so Panzee volunteers the ZingZillas to do it. Zak isn't very happy about this and when it is suggested that they sing a washing-up song while they are doing it, he dashes off to the glade to see the guest. In the glade, DJ introduces Zak to the Mahatma Skiffle Orchestra, which consists of a spoon player, a washboard player, a tea chest bass and a cups player. They play skiffle music. Zak loves the percussive sounds. Tang joins him and they listen. The ZingZillas gather together in the clubhouse to do the washing up, but the number of dishes doesn't seem to be going down. Then they notice that Drum is taking the clean, dry dishes from the end of the process and taking them back to the start. They've been washing the same dishes over and over again! Guest performers: Mahatma Skiffle Orchestra
100	22	"Zak Loves Dancing"	Iwan Watson	Adam Redfern	5 June 2012
In the glade, DJ introduces Valentino and the Grecian Dancers. Valentino plays the bazouki. Panzee and Tang love the music and dancing and think it would make a great sound for Zak to dance to. They dash off to tell Zak. On the beach, Panzee and Tang show Zak their tune. He loves it and starts to dance to it immediately. When they finish they know they have an absolutely brilliant Big Zing. Guest performers: Valentino & The Grecian Dancers
101	23	"Everybody Bogle to the Island Beat"	Iwan Watson	Dominic Macdonald	6 June 2012
Panzee asks Todd for a musical style for the Big Zing. Todd asks the machine, but it goes haywire, spitting out musical style after musical style. Eventually the ZingZillas give up. In the glade, the ZingZillas are gathered with their instruments. Panzee says they need to think of a song and there is a cough behind them. They turn to see Granite and Gravel, who announce that they would like to sing their song. The ZingZillas happily play along while Granite and Gravel sing, but when they have finished Granite and Gravel aren't happy. They didn't like the musical style that the song was sung in. Zak rushes in with Todd's enormous piece of paper with all the musical styles the machine printed out earlier. Now they can choose a style that will suit the Granite and Gravel song. They try thrash metal (too fast & too noisy), bossa nova and reggae. Granite and Gravel like reggae best. Gravel suggests that they all bogle to the beat. He explains that bogelling is a type of dance for reggae music. Zak says that everyone must bogle to the island beat!
102	24	"Magical Carpet Ride"	Iwan Watson	Nazneen Momen	7 June 2012
Panzee wishes she could fly, and the ZingZillas decide that they want to sing a song about flying. In the glade, DJ introduces Panzee and Tang to Hassan Eraji. He plays the oud. The plucking and strumming of the oud is a wonderful sound and Tang and Panzee both think it's perfect for a Big Zing. Back at the clubhouse, Tang is telling the others about the oud and what a magical sound it made. Zak wonders about what sort of thing he could fly on - an aeroplane, a rocket? Drum suggests a magic carpet! Perfect! The ZingZillas play a song called Magical Carpet Ride. When they have finished practising, they think they are ready for the Big Zing, but then Panzee has a problem. She still wants to fly. In fact, she wants to fly so much, she has decided that she is not going to play in the Big Zing until she can! Guest performer: Hassan Erraji
103	25	"Staying Up Late"	Iwan Watson	Dominic Macdonald	8 June 2012
Todd is looking through his telescope, getting ready for the arrival of a comet that night. Tang explains to Drum that a comet is a fiery ball of gas and rock and ice that flies through space. The ZingZillas all want to see the comet and ask if they can stay up late to see it. Todd says they can. Drum gets very excited, but Zak pretends that he never gets excited. Tang suggests they write a special staying-up-late song. DJ introduces Simon Finch who is a trumpet player. He has a mute in his trumpet which gives it a special sound. He is also playing a slow, sleepy melody that is perfect for their song. Guest performer: Simon Finch
104	26	"Picnic Day"	Michael Towner	Dominic Macdonald	11 June 2012
Last ever episode. The ZingZillas decide to watch two of their favourite Big Zings, and then choose one to end the show with. Meanwhile in the glade, Granite and Gravel are relaxing with a picnic. They explain to DJ that it is their day off and they won't be counting coconuts, so DJ asks the Beach Byrds to count the coconuts instead. The Beach Byrds have to rush back and forth to do two jobs at once - counting the coconuts and singing the jingle for DJ. Eventually getting tired and sweaty in the process until Granite and Gravel return and count the last one. Guest performers: Urban Strawberry Lunch, Mariachi El Mexicano, Bond

== DVD releases ==
Release name	UK release date	Notes
Welcome to the Island	Monday 4 October 2010	Despite being filmed in HD no Blu-ray release
World Music Tour	Monday 15 November 2010	Despite being filmed in HD no Blu-ray release

=== Welcome to the Island ===
This DVD contains five episodes (note that it's not the first five of the series, although there's a lot of overlap):

1. Didgeridoo Hullabaloo (Series 1, Episode 1)
2. Operatic Todd (Series 1, Episode 6)
3. Rock Guitar (Series 1, Episode 3)
4. Auntie Dot’s Dash (Series 1, Episode 4)
5. A Great Place to Live (Series 1, Episode 11)

Extras: Musical instrument game and character profile.

=== World Music Tour ===
This DVD contains five episodes:

1. Bhangra Beats (Series 1, Episode 8)
2. Welcome Beach Byrds (Series 1, Episode 14)
3. Keep Your Castanets (Series 1, Episode 17)
4. Disappearing Drum (Series 1, Episode 16)
5. Bam-Boo! (Series 2, Episode 3)

Extras: Interactive game
