= Hertfordshire Showband =

Formally known as "The Marching Blues", The Hertfordshire Showband is based in Potters Bar, Hertfordshire and is one of the United Kingdom's most successful marching bands. The 75 strong band is administered by the Hertfordshire Band Academy. The Band is for both young people and adults and features Brass, Flute and Percussion sections. They meet for practices on Mondays at 8pm for senior band and 7pm for cadets at Mount Grace School Hall, Potters Bar.

Members perform in numerous competitions (such as the BYBA Brass Explosion), concerts and events both locally and abroad. Over the past few years the band has competed in the World Music Contest (WMC), World Showband Contest and the European Marching & Showband Championships winning five gold and two silver medals. The Showband has also performed at Windsor Castle, The Royal Tournament, Birmingham Tattoo, Disneyland Paris, Lord Mayor's Show in London and in many other prestigious events and parades.

They have also had some notable television appearance in their former guise as The Marching Blues, appearing on the BBC's Blue Peter, they have also been on CBeebies show ZingZillas.

In addition to Showband competitions and high-profile public engagements, the band also perform concerts at Potters Bar, whether it be in a theatre, park bandstand or pub garden. They hold a Christmas Concert at the Wyllyotts Theatre in Potters Bar annually. The bandmaster is Mr Terry Barnes, who has overseen the band since its conception. The band welcomes new members and offers group lessons in brass and percussion, primarily aimed at 9 to 15 year olds, however, adult support is also welcomed. The band is a registered charity.

== Music ==
The Hertfordshire Showband play a wide variety of music for all kinds of occasions, from Showband competition arena displays to prestigious parades such as The Lord Mayor's Show. They also perform a number of pieces for static concerts and the occasional wedding.

Music from Star Wars to Les Misérables, "Soul Man" to "Wind Beneath My Wings" to Robbie Williams to Big Band Medleys to St Louis Blues, their repertoire includes movie themes, classic songs & music from the West End, Big Band/Swing numbers and a few military marches too.

== Uniform and styling ==
As with most marching bands, the band wears a uniform for parades and Marching Band displays. They were a military-esk jacket of bright blue (hence the previous name of the band) with gold braiding, black trousers with a red stripe and a white parade hat with red plume.

They have a new colour scheme with the introduction of the new name that is based on a black with either gold or silver writing and a new stylised logo featuring a treble clef integrated with Hertfordshire's Hart icon.

They now wear black T-shirts and band jackets when not on parade, but currently retain the blue uniform for marching performances.
