= Alvin Hall =

American financial adviser, author, and media personality

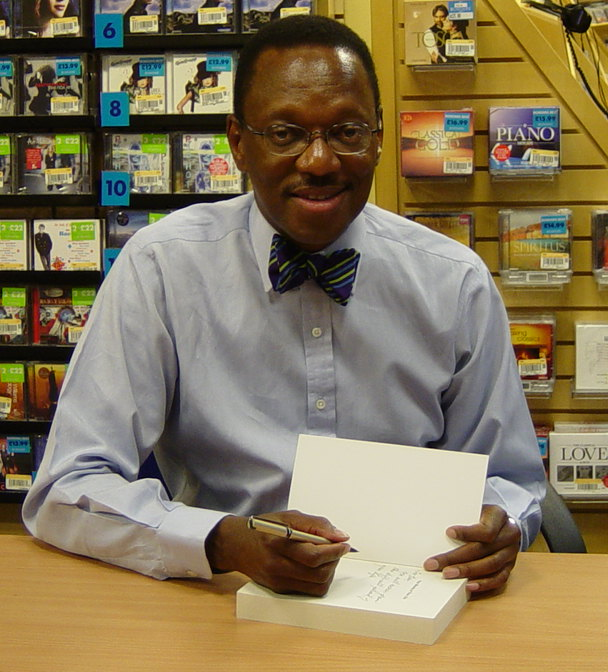
- Hall at a book signing
- Born: June 27, 1952 (age 74); Crawfordville, Florida, U.S.
- Occupations: Financial adviser, journalist, broadcaster
- Website: http://alvinhall.com/

Alvin Darnell Hall (born June 27, 1952) is an American financial educator, author, and media personality.

== Financial adviser ==
Hall studied for a Bachelor of Arts in English at Bowdoin College. After a period working as a college professor (teaching literature), he moved to New York and started working in finance.

In 1990, Hall briefly lectured British stockbrokers in London in preparation for the NASD exams in the United States.

Hall has written books and articles on saving and investing as well as debt management. He presented Your Money or Your Life on BBC2 and has made various television and radio appearances, including as a panellist on Dave Gorman's Important Astrology Experiment and The Apprentice: You're Fired.

He also edits a money column in the UK's Reveal magazine. He has written Money Magic for the charitable organisation Quick Reads which encourages people to get back into the habit of reading. He was involved in Jamie Oliver's programme, Jamie's Dream School. On the programme, Hall taught the pupils mathematics.

In 2019, Hall received Bowdoin College's 2019 Alumni Service Award from for his commitment to his alma mater throughout his career.

== Art collector ==
Hall is an art collector whose pieces include works by Carroll Dunham, Victoria Morton, Tina Barney, Lee Friedlander, Carrie Mae Weems, El Anatsui, and Mel Kendrick.

== BBC Radio ==
Hall has presented several finance-related radio programmes for BBC Radio 4, which often broadcast in the period when Radio 4's personal finance programme Money Box is off-air.

Hall won the Wincott Award for business journalism for his 2006 documentary Jay-Z: From Brooklyn to the Boardroom in which he interviewed and profiled the entrepreneurial rap star Jay-Z.

December 2016 saw Hall present The Green Book. Taking listeners on a journey from his childhood home using the listings from the original The Negro Motorist Green Book by Victor H Green

He presented The Gospel Truth, exploring how this genre of American religious music has been affected by both commercialization and secularization.

== Literature ==
Hall has authored several works mainly focused on his work as a financial adviser. In 2024 he wrote Driving the Green Book, published by HarperCollins, drawing upon his experiences of his audio series on BBC Radio 4.
