= Jeremiah Krage =

British actor (born 1974)

- Born: Jeremiah Krage; 1974 (age 50–51)
- Occupation: Actor
- Years active: 2010–present

Jeremiah Krage is a British-American actor who appears in television, including the 2015 reboot of Teletubbies as Tinky Winky.

== Career ==
Among his many credits he appeared in the eighth series Doctor Who as a Cyberman, portrayed Zak in ZingZillas, and in 2015, Krage was chosen to portray Tinky Winky the purple Teletubby in the new series of Teletubbies. He is the third actor, after Dave Thompson and Simon Shelton, to play the character. He reprised the role as Tinky Winky in the Netflix reboot series.

== Filmography ==
=== TV series ===
- Doctor Who – Cyberman
- Nuzzle and Scratch: Frock and Roll - Prince
- Pixelface – Twin Robot, The Bug
- Teletubbies – Tinky Winky (2015–present)
- ZingZillas – Zak
