= Newhall Publishing =

- Company type: Private company
- Industry: Marketing
- Founded: 1962; 64 years ago
- Founder: Joseph K. Douglas
- Headquarters: Wirral, United Kingdom
- Area served: England
- Products: Marketing across print, digital, design, strategy, and media sales as well as subscription & membership management
- Owner: Employee owned
- Number of employees: 38 (2022)
- Website: newhallpublishing.com

Newhall Publishing is a British content marketing agency that focuses on multi-channel publishing of marketing material. The company offers ten services including print, digital, design, strategy, media sales, subscription & membership management, distribution & fulfilment, data management, client services and event sales.

Newhall has built a significant portfolio with a diverse client base including membership organisations, event companies and multinational businesses. Newhall has grown to become one of the United Kingdom's leading content publishers.

== History ==
The business was established in 1962, when its founder, Joseph K. Douglas, created the "Cancer & Polio Research Fund News Letter," to provide updates on the fundraising activities of the related charity.

By 1986 the newsletter had evolved into Candis magazine, published by Newhall on behalf of Candis Club.

The company changed its name to Newhall Publishing in 2014 in what was described as a rebranding consistent with the company's expanded focus on the multi-media content marketing industry. In 2022 Andrew Douglas, grandson of the founder, sold the business to an Employee Ownership Trust giving control to its employees.
