= I'm a Celebrity...Get Me Out of Here! (British TV series) =

British reality television series

- Logo used from 2025 onwards
- Genre: Reality television
- Created by: Richard Cowles; Natalka Znak; Stewart Morris; Mark Busk-Cowley; Alexander Gardiner; Jim Allen; Brent Baker
- Developed by: London Weekend Television
- Directed by: Vicky Hamilton; Richard Power
- Presented by: Declan Donnelly; Ant McPartlin; Holly Willoughby
- Starring: See list of contestants
- Theme music composer: Grant Buckerfield
- Country of origin: United Kingdom
- Original language: English
- No. of series: 26
- No. of episodes: 491

Production
- Executive producers: Richard Cowles; Chris Brogden; Becca Walker
- Production locations: Tully, Queensland (2002); Dungay, New South Wales, Australia (2003–2019, 2022–present); Gwrych Castle (2020–2021)
- Camera setup: Multi-camera
- Running time: 60–120 mins (including adverts)
- Production companies: London Weekend Television (2002–2004); Granada London Productions (2004–2005); ITV Productions (2006–2008); ITV Studios Entertainment (2009–2020); Lifted Entertainment (2021–present)

Original release
- Network: ITV
- Release: 25 August 2002 – present

Related
- I'm a Celebrity: Unpacked; I'm a Celebrity...South Africa; I'm a Celebrity: The Wild Frontier

I'm a Celebrity...Get Me Out of Here! (often shortened to I'm a Celebrity or I'm a Celeb) is a British survival reality television show broadcast on ITV. It was created by London Weekend Television (LWT) and is produced by Lifted Entertainment. The format sees a group of celebrities living together in uncomfortable conditions with few creature comforts. Each member undertakes challenges to secure additional food and treats for the group, and to avoid being voted out by viewers during their stay, with the final episode's votes nominating who wins a series. Celebrities are paid for their participation.

The programme's first series debuted on 25 August 2002 and was filmed within Tully, Queensland, Australia. From the second series in 2003 until 2019, it was filmed around Murwillumbah, New South Wales, Australia. The 2020 and 2021 series were filmed at Gwrych Castle in Conwy County Borough, Wales, owing to the COVID-19 pandemic, before returning to Australia in 2022. Celebrities participating on the programme nominate a charity to receive a donation from ITV, with the money raised from charges on voting via text, phone or interactive services. Each series has been hosted by Ant & Dec, with the sole exception being the eighteenth series in 2018 when Ant McPartlin suspended his TV appearances for a year, so Declan Donnelly was joined instead by Holly Willoughby.

I'm a Celebrity is often a ratings winner for ITV, attracting on average more than 9 million viewers each series, with its success spawning an international franchise of the same name. The main show was accompanied by a sister show from 2002 until 2020 and again from 2024 on ITV2, now entitled I'm a Celebrity: Unpacked, which features behind-the-scenes footage and discussions on celebrities voted out of the latest episode, and clips of the next episode. Over the years the programme has been frequently nominated for, and won, several television industry awards. For example, in 2022, the show won in The Sir Bruce Forsyth Entertainment Award category at the National Television Awards.

A spin-off series, I'm a Celebrity... South Africa, featuring celebrities who had previously competed in the show, began airing in 2023 and returned for a second series in 2026. This is to be followed by a pairs variation of the format, entitled The Wild Frontier, which is set in Canada and will debut in 2027.

In December 2025, Ant & Dec signed a new three year contract with ITV, leading to I'm a Celebrity being recommissioned under the deal until its twenty-eighth series in 2028.

== Format ==
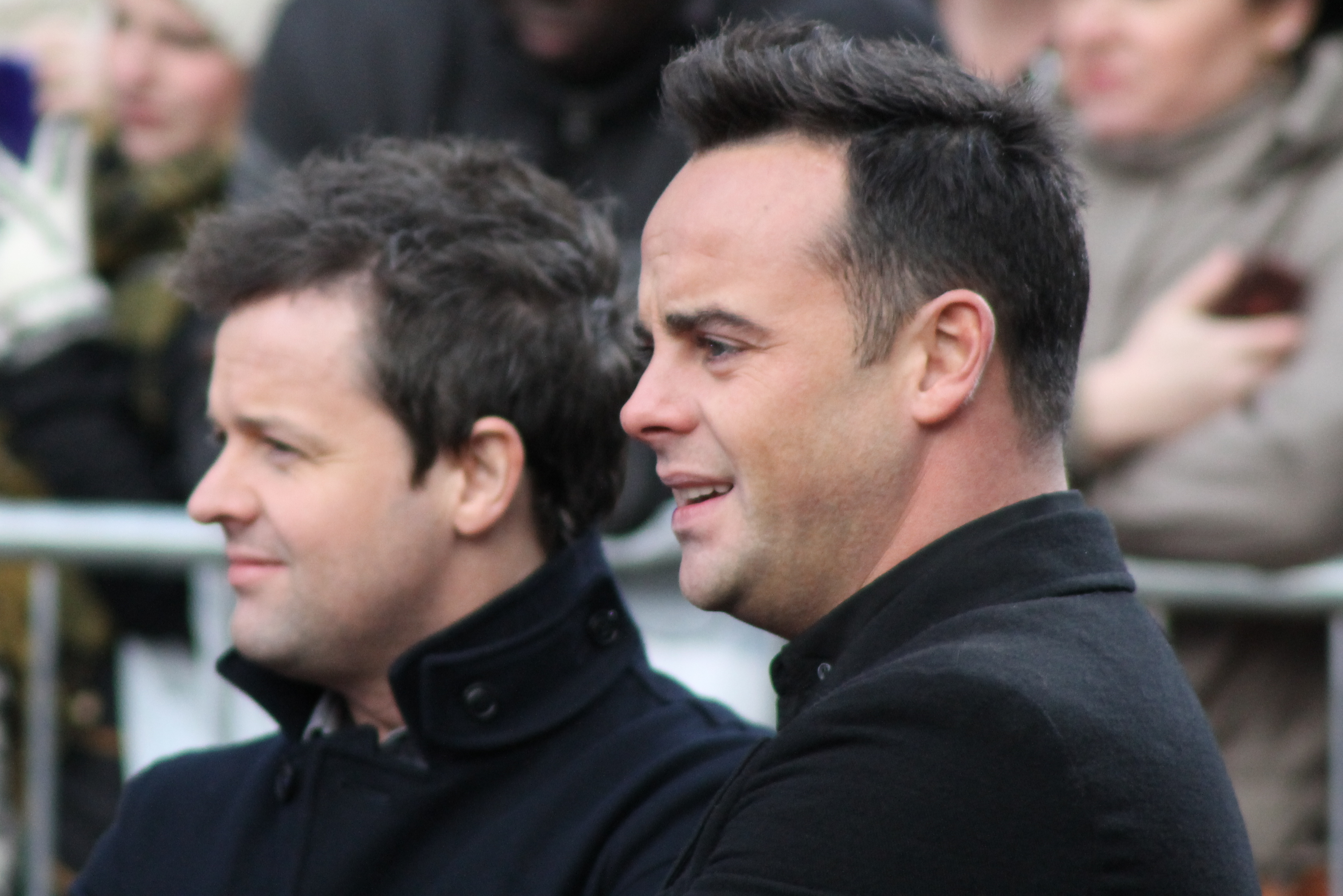
Ant & Dec have hosted the show together since it began in 2002, with the exception of the 2018 series.

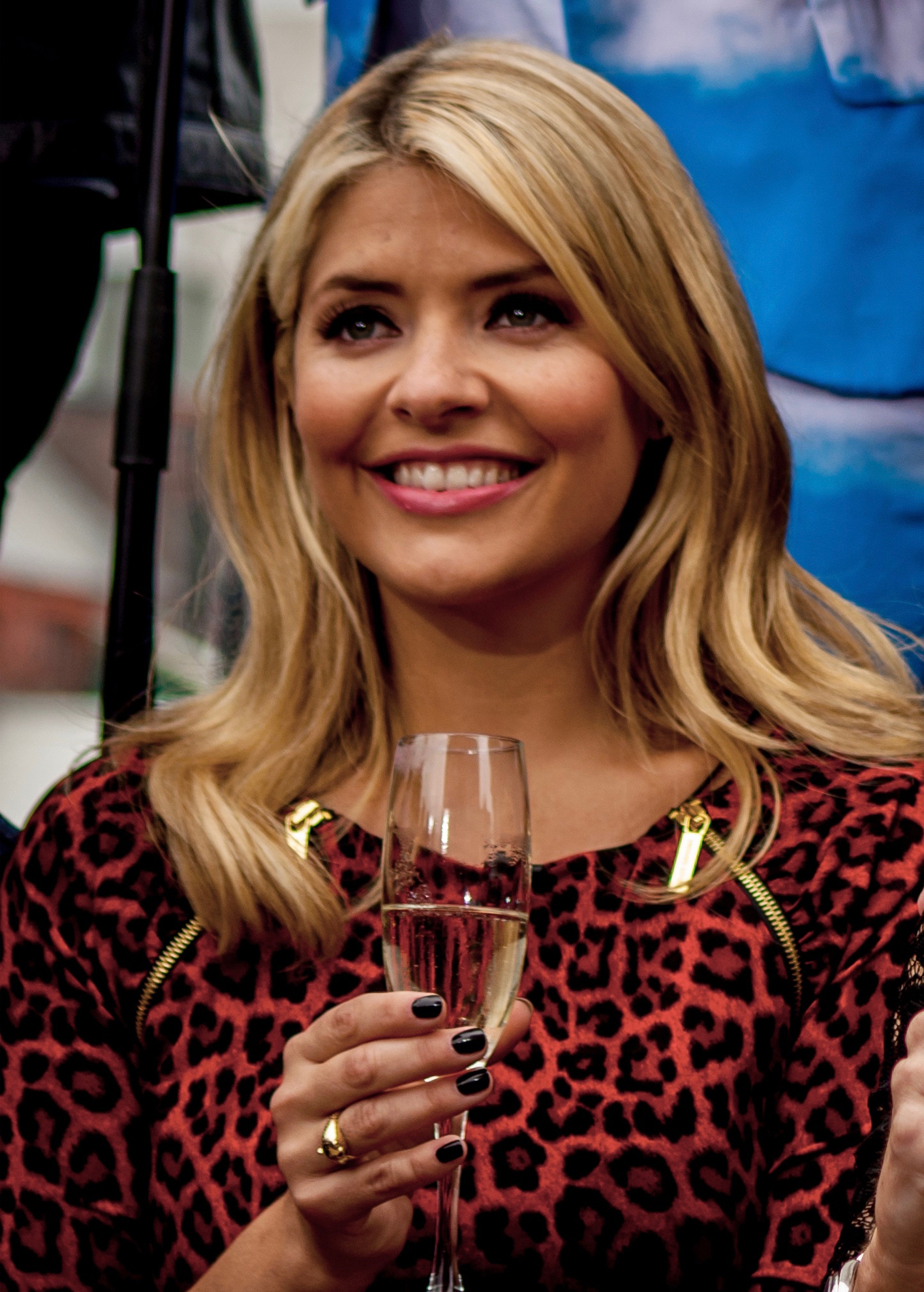
Dec was joined by Holly Willoughby for the 2018 series

The celebrities have to complete challenges to earn food for camp; else they have to survive off a diet of basic rations, this consists of a small measured portion of plain rice and dried haricot/navy beans for each celebrity per day. These rations should be consumed together as they provide complementary nutrients and form a complete protein. If the celebrities struggle with the lack of food, the medical team may provide them with some electrolyte drinks and glucose in order to avoid serious medical emergencies.

A wide range of personal and everyday items, including any outside food or drink and extra clothing, are prohibited and must not be brought into camp. Essential items are limited, with a matching uniform also provided by the production team that must be worn as mandatory. A single luxury item is allowed and are usually given out as a reward for completing tasks. If celebrities are caught with these banned items, this may result in them being punished individually or as a whole group. They are also not allowed any time-keeping devices, or to simply know what the time is, in order to heighten the experience and maintain a sense of disorientation. In the first series of the show, deodorant was banned and tobacco smoking was not allowed anywhere in camp as the rules on this were much stricter but have since been relaxed. Vaping has more recently been permitted, if a doctor's prescription is provided, but this must now also be done off-camera.

In return for their appearance on I'm a Celebrity...Get Me Out of Here!, in early series of the show, the celebrities are asked to nominate a charity to which the producers, ITV Studios, make donations. The money is raised by allowing viewers to vote by phone or text for the celebrity they would like to complete a "Bushtucker Trial" – a physical task usually involving snakes, spiders or other creepy-crawlies found in the jungle – and, later in each series, to vote for the celebrity they would like to see win the show. The final remaining celebrity is declared the winner of the show, and is branded the "King" or "Queen" of the Jungle/Castle. The show's title refers to a phrase celebrities can use to quit jungle trials or even leave the show altogether.

Ahead of the 2025 series, premium-rate phone and text voting was discontinued in favour of continued app and online voting. A portion of the profits made from each phone or text vote was donated by ITV to a nominated charity or campaign; over the years, this has included Malaria No More UK, Make-A-Wish Foundation UK and more recently ITV's Britain Get Talking.

The celebrities themselves are also paid a fee to compensate them for possible loss of earnings while they are in the jungle; the amount significantly varies based on the celebrities fame and profile at the time. They must stay in the camp for a minimum of 72 hours to receive their full fee, which may be reduced if they leave earlier than this, although this has not been publicly confirmed by ITV. Since the fourth series, usually two (or occasionally three) late arrivals are introduced to the show a few days after the initial group has settled in camp. For a few days, in the majority of series, the campmates are split into two competing teams and live in separate camps.

=== Bushtucker trials ===
Bushtucker trials are used throughout the show to allow the contestants to gain more diverse, locally sourced food, typically a range of exotic meats, fruits and vegetables (but does not include basic ingredients) that they prepare and cook in camp for dinner each evening; they can do this by collecting or earning gold stars. The number of stars available usually corresponds to the current number of campmates. A live trial was first held in the third series and was an annual feature in subsequent editions until its removal in 2021. It returned after a five-year absence in 2025.

The Bushtucker Trials feature one, sometimes two or more, of the celebrities taking part and are held daily; they appear in two formats: eating trials, or physical/mental tasks. Some trials, typically at the start and end of a series, require the participation of all campmates; usually in the first half of the series, viewers make the selection in a nightly vote and later, as the series progresses towards the final week, the campmates decide amongst themselves with viewers from that point now starting to vote out the celebrities in camp. Some may be excused for certain trials due to "medical grounds". Any task can be stopped by shouting "I'm a Celebrity...Get Me Out of Here!", causing the celebrity to forfeit the collected stars. Occasionally a celebrity may decide to withdraw or stop a trial before it has commenced. For the 2025 series, ITV introduced a new rule in which the same celebrity cannot be voted to take part in a bushtucker trial on more than two consecutive days. In more recent series, instead of winning stars, the final trial usually involves the last remaining celebrities competing in a multi-part individual or group trial to win a luxurious, fully prepared final banquet dinner in camp with starters, mains, desserts and drinks of their choice. Treats and rewards include letters from home, a visit from loved ones and, in more recent series, also a trip to the "Jungle Arms" where they can enjoy an evening of drinks, snacks and karaoke, all of which feature as key segments in one of the nightly highlight episodes.

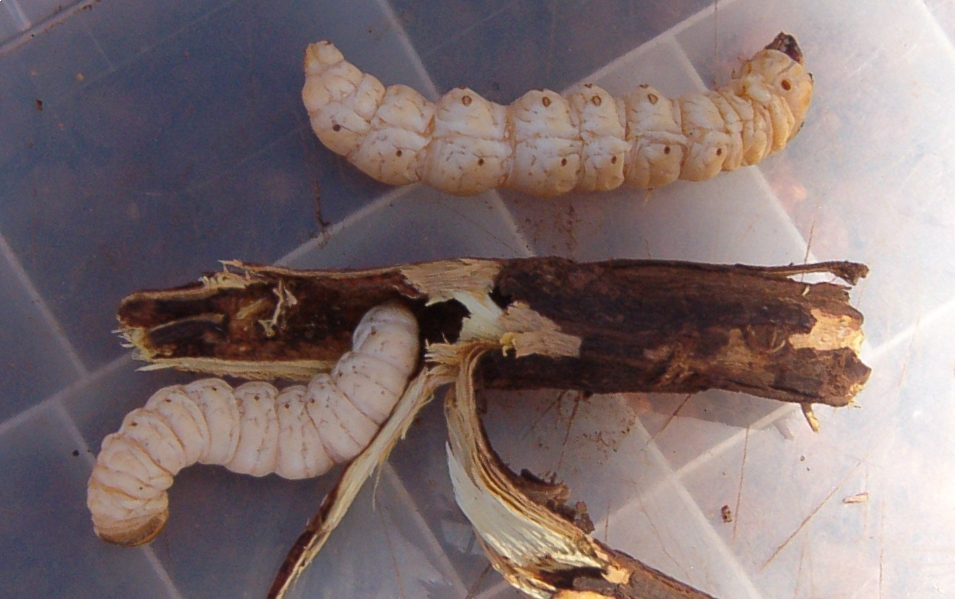
Witchetty grubs, a staple in the diets of Aboriginal Australians, are commonly featured in eating trials. Contestants are required to bite off the head and eat the body.

In the eating trials, contestants are required to eat a variety of different "jungle" foods. Each dish successfully eaten will gain the contestants one star, which equals one meal for camp (although the number of meals per star can vary). The foods that are required to be eaten can include: crickets (in a variety of forms, such as cooked into biscuits, blended into drinks or eaten dead), green ants, mealworms, witchetty grub, roasted spider or tarantulas, genitals of various animals, cockroach (prepared in various ways such as being cooked into biscuits, blended into drinks, eaten alive or dead). Other past foods include beach worms, bull's tongues, the anus of various animals, vomit fruits, cooked pigs' brains, various animal testicles, raw fish eyes, sheep eyes, blended rats or mice tails. Prior to the airing of the nineteenth series in 2019, ITV announced that eating trials would no longer contain live bugs.

The second type of challenge is more of a physical or mental task that requires the contestants to perform activities to gain stars. These can include searching through dung, going through tunnels, negotiating obstacles on high wires, or performing other tasks. One off these is the now-annual "Celebrity Cyclone", which officially began in the sixth series and in contrast to every other Bushtucker trial, is played as a fun lighthearted challenge. It replaced two similar trials, "Hell Hill" that was used in the third and fourth series and "Satan's Slope" from series five. Cyclone features all of the remaining celebrities dressing up as superheroes as they try to walk up a huge slippery waterslide, whilst holding giant yellow or gold stars, and being pelted by plastic gym balls and footballs, drenched in litres of slime and water, hit by water cannons, and being blown by wind machines. Within a time limit, they must reach their numbered marker and hold their star(s) in place until the klaxon sounds to win. It is widely praised by celebrities and viewers as iconic, the best trial ever and a highlight of the series. In November 2025, it was reported that its popularity led to ITV producing a pilot for a stand-alone game show, using Cyclone as the core basis of the format, which was recorded in late 2024 and hosted by Joel Dommett. It was not picked up for a series run.

=== Other challenges ===
Another way that contestants can earn treats is to do what is known, since series 22, as the "Deals on Wheels Challenge" (formerly the "Dingo Dollar Challenge"), which replaced the original "Celebrity Chest" from the twelfth series onwards. This involves two or more celebrities going into the jungle on certain days to undertake a typically more enjoyable and simple task, that releases an item to open a container with an amount of dingo dollars.

Once that has been completed and the dollars have been retrieved, it is taken to a small woodshack shop elsewhere to purchase a snack option (formerly campmates were able to pick between two options) from shopkeeper Kiosk Keith, and in Series 18 onwards, Kiosk Kev (played by Australian Survivor contestant Mark "Tarzan" Herlaar) that is on display. In the 2017 series, Keith (played by actor Raymond Grant) was temporarily replaced by Kiosk Kath before being axed from the series. Before receiving their prize, the campmates back in the camp must answer a general knowledge or survey question posed by Kiosk Kev over the telephone. If the campmates answer correctly, the pair at the location receive the treat, which they must later share with their other campmates; if they answer incorrectly, the kiosk operator slams the shutter shut down, and the celebrities must return to camp empty-handed. In the original version, the chest is brought back to camp and opened to reveal the question and the two possible answers, with the treat/prize found inside the section of chest labelled with the correct answer and sometimes a joke, consolation prize in the other.

In the 2020 series, as a result of not being able to film in Australia owing to the COVID-19 pandemic, and the 2021 series owing to the country's borders remaining shut, this challenge was replaced by a "Castle Coin Challenge", in-keeping with the theme of being at Gwrych Castle in Wales, rather than in the Australian Jungle. Other than that, the basic format of the challenge is the same. The only other format change to note is that Kiosk Kev has been replaced by his Welsh counterpart, Kiosk Cledwyn. Cledwyn was played by a local Welshman whose name was never officially revealed by ITV, with the character named after the former Labour politician Cledwyn Hughes.

For the twenty-sixth series in 2026, the "Deals on Wheels" challenges have been phased out for the Jungle Hotline; with Kiosk Kev being available for the celebrities to call on the phone instead of serving them from his jungle shop. The challenge will be based around the golden phone box and locked shut in a different way each time it closes, with the celebrities having to figure out how to open it. If successful, they will be able to phone Kev on his hotline for the chance to win a treat. Kev will call a phone box to reveal a treat inside the camp, but to be awarded it, they must complete a task or answer the question he gives them correctly and the postbox will open, though if they are not successful, their treat will be destroyed in front of them.

== Production ==
=== Filming locations ===
==== Queensland, Australia (2002) ====
The first series of the show in 2002 was filmed on a smaller site that was once part of King Ranch (officially El Rancho del Rey) in Kooroomool, near Tully, Queensland, in Australia. Once eliminated from the show, the celebrities stayed at Mission Beach's Horizon hotel.

==== New South Wales, Australia (2003–2019, 2022–present) ====
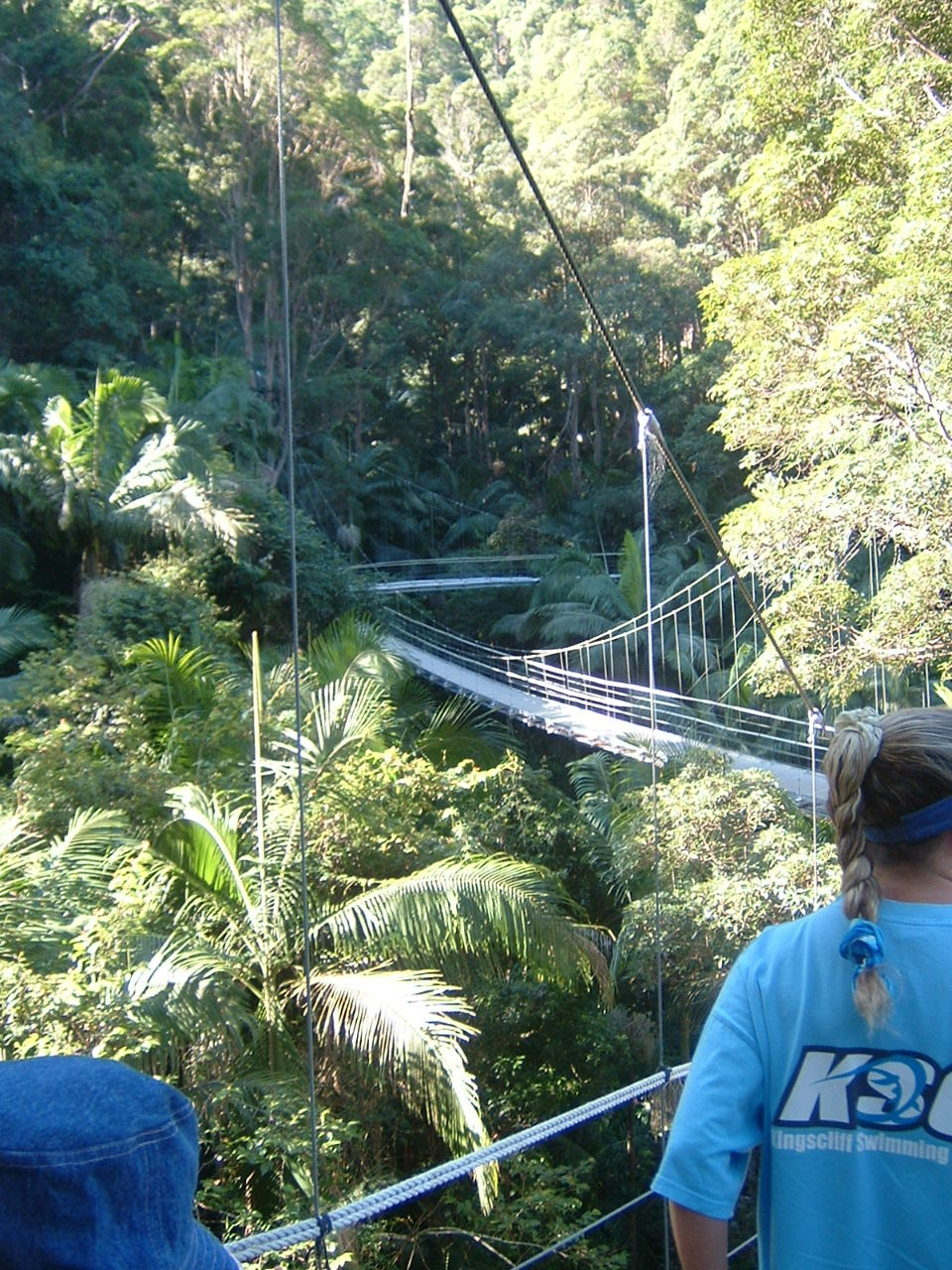
Suspension bridges that lead into the camp in Dungay, north-eastern New South Wales (April 2004)

Since the second series the following year, the programme has been filmed around Springbrook National Park, near Murwillumbah, New South Wales, Australia. The camp and filming studios are located in Dungay on Creek Road. The area is on the edge of a site that is technically classified by the local council as a lowland subtropical rainforest, rather than a jungle as referred to in the show. For the fifth series in 2005, there were reportedly plans to relocate the show to the coastal town of Cardwell in Queensland; however, this did not happen owing to logistical problems and time constraints in building the new set and required infrastructure.

Inside the entrance to the filming location is an open area allocated to buildings which accommodate on-site medical facilities, containers for the storage of props, and other backstage facilities. Families and friends of the celebrities are housed here each morning during evictions. From this area, a restricted access road climbs to the site of the studios. The road then descends into a valley via four-wheel drive access to the set of the show. The camp is connected to the studio building via a series of suspension bridges and a drawbridge, the latter of which was installed after contestants from the second series left camp in protest over the small amount of food they received after a trial. A retractable canopy positioned high above the central part of camp can be used to protect the contestants and filming equipment from rainfall but is not completely weatherproof. It is also used to facilitate the delivery of food that is won in bushtucker trials. Some of the scenery in camp is artificial but was designed to blend into the natural environment, e.g. a rock wall that is used to conceal cameras and other production equipment, an area with a pond and a small pump-powered waterfall feature. Ahead of the 2026 series, the main camp was modified to make it accessible for Ade Adepitan, the programme's first wheelchair-using contestant.

Before they enter and after leaving the jungle, the celebrities stay at a luxury hotel that is featured in the Coming Out episode at the end of the series. Since the show's return to Australia in 2022, the hotel used is the JW Marriott Gold Coast Resort & Spa, located in Surfers Paradise, Queensland; this replaced the Palazzo Versace which was originally used for the show. Paramedic Bob McCarron, known informally as "Medic Bob", and his team of assistants are responsible for the medical care and wellbeing of the celebrities and crew. McCarran was usually seen during Bushtucker Trials when medical assistance was required. In September 2022, it was reported that McCarron had decided not to return for that year's series due to scheduling conflicts with other projects and was replaced by another medic/doctor off screen. McCarron did not appear in the 2020 and 2021 series filmed in Wales due to COVID-19 travel restrictions.

In December 2016, ITV Studios established the ITV Tweed Community Initiative Fund to assist projects and initiatives within the Tweed Shire as a way of giving back to the local community and created an independent community committee from across the shire to adjudicate the grants. In August 2025, it was reported that ITV were negotiating a five-year extension of its filming contract with Australian officials and the Tweed Shire Council; if successful, this would grant them permission to remain at the same site until 2030.

Although filming takes place in New South Wales while Australian Eastern Daylight Time (UTC+11) is in effect, live broadcasts on ITV display Australian Eastern Standard Time (UTC+10) due to the camp's proximity to the Queensland border.

==== Gwrych Castle, Wales (2020–2021) ====
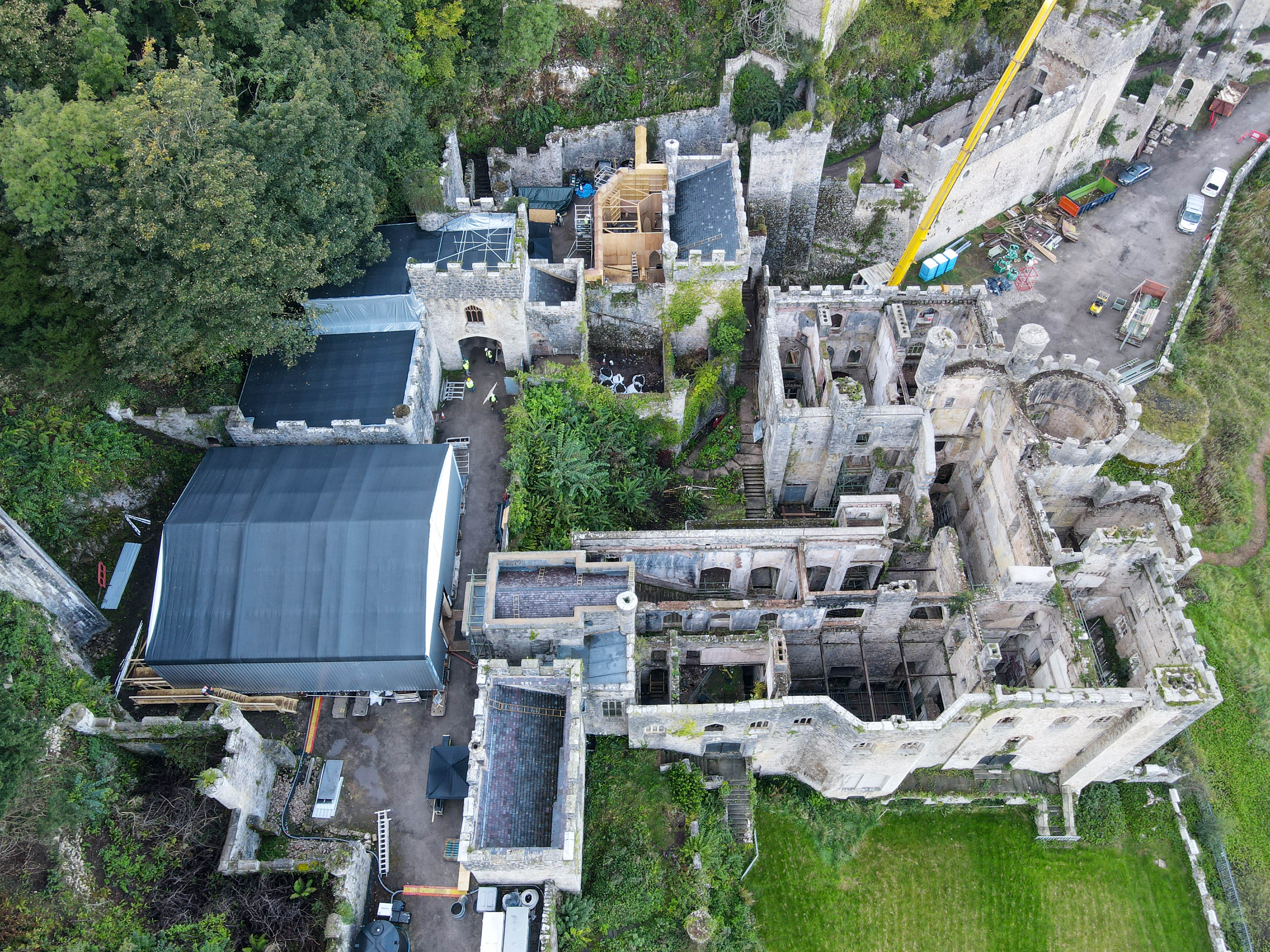
Work on Gwrych Castle to prepare for filming (October 2020)

In August 2020, it was confirmed that owing to the COVID-19 pandemic, the twentieth series would be filmed in Gwrych Castle in Abergele, North Wales. Filming the show in the UK required production schedules to be altered due to the change in timezones; instead of primarily filming the trials during daytime hours they instead had to film these in the late evening, after the live show is aired, so that the recorded footage could be cut down and edited together in time to be broadcast as part of the next evening's episode. This also meant the celebrities were eliminated from the show in the evening instead of during the morning. Following this, the contestants stayed at Carden Park Hotel in Cheshire, England.

As part of the agreement with Gwrych Castle Preservation Trust, ITV will help support the ongoing restoration project of the site. This has included the adding of permanent roofs to certain sections of the castle and repairs to the walls, floors and stairs to make the building safe and secure. ITV has reportedly donated £300,000 to the trust for the use of the site for four months, as well as paying for additional emergency restoration work. Production began on the site in September 2020 to prepare it ahead of the series launch. Various aspects of the show were reimagined and themed around the Welsh castle setting.

On 2 August 2021, it was confirmed that the show would return to Wales for a second series, owing to "continued uncertainty" over the COVID-19 pandemic and travel restrictions."

In October 2021, it was reported that ITV Studios' U.S. subsidiary and horror film studio Blumhouse was pitching a reboot of the American version of I'm a Celebrity under the title Celebrity Castle, which was reported to have expanded upon the series 20 concept.

In October 2025, the castle's preservation trust revealed that a number of props and costumes used in the two series filmed in North Wales were being sold off to raise additional funds.

=== Music ===
The show's theme music is credited to Grant Buckerfield and contains samples of "Africano" by Earth, Wind & Fire, "Get Out of the House!" by Boom Crash Opera and "Tonight I'm Free (Cool Mix)" by PJ & Duncan.

== Controversies and criticism ==
In 2006, ITV apologised after confusion over instructions for telephone and red-button interactive voting led to allegations in the media that the wrong person had been evicted in the run-off vote between Toby Anstis and Dean Gaffney in the sixth series.

In November 2006, the series was forced to enhance its procedures after Ofcom found that it had breached Rule 1.16 of the Broadcasting Code for airing bad language before the watershed. An episode broadcast on 30 November 2006 was ruled to have breached Rule 2.2 of the Broadcasting Code after an investigation launched as part of the wider UK television public voting controversy. Owing to late running, seven percent of phone and text votes for that episode of the show were not counted, although this did not affect the result.

Sarah Matravers blamed the series for the breakdown of her relationship with contestant Marc Bannerman after he flirted with Cerys Matthews in the seventh series. Matthews and Bannerman later alleged the footage had been edited by ITV.

Former Sex Pistols manager Malcolm McLaren, who was due to appear on the seventh series but pulled out at the last minute, alleged that the show and the choice of winner was fixed, and the trials posed no real danger. He alleged that the show doctor told him that "Things are so safe, I would send my own kids in to do the show. There is nothing bad in there. They're hoodwinking the public".

In 2009, ITV apologised for not having properly advised the contestants in the ninth series of the relevant Australian legislation regarding animal cruelty. Gino D'Acampo and Stuart Manning were charged by New South Wales Police after RSPCA Australia complained over their killing and eating of a rat during the show.

In 2012, the decision by Nadine Dorries to enter the show was the source of criticism, which led to her suspension from the Conservative Party owing to allegations she did not seek permission from the party whip Andrew Mitchell, resulting in an inquiry by the Parliamentary Commissioner for Standards.

The fifteenth series saw Ferne McCann eat a live water spider as part of a bushtucker trial. Ofcom reportedly received 694 complaints from the public over allegations of "animal cruelty for entertainment". ITV also received 500 complaints. In January 2016, it was reported no further action would be taken.

In 2017, viewers complained that camp mate Iain Lee was the subject of bullying and isolation from other camp mates during the seventeenth series, and there were concerns raised owing to the effect it could have on his mental health. There were calls for fellow contestant Rebekah Vardy to be cut as a mental health ambassador, owing to her alleged role in the "bullying". On the ITV programme Good Morning Britain the day after her eviction, Vardy defended herself for remarks she made about Iain Lee in Extra Camp, the ITV2 spin-off series, stating that she was "under pressure", and that they were taken out of context. After his eviction from the camp, Dennis Wise also said on Good Morning Britain that he and Lee were on friendly terms, and said that ITV would not allow bullying on the show. He later accused the show of 'editing him' to look like a bully. Following his third place eviction, Lee directly addressed his relationship with those accused of "picking on him", stating that he "loves them" and that there's "no beef between [them]". He also addressed claims that he had a "game plan", stating that he was just being himself.

In 2019, some viewers criticised Adele Roberts' elimination after a typing error in the app caused confusion over the votes. App votes were therefore not counted, which led to only phone votes to have an effect on the elimination.

That same year, Chris Packham wrote an open letter to Ant & Dec expressing his desire for them to retire the bushtucker trials.

On 13 November 2020, the RSPCA stated that it had "serious concerns about the welfare of animals" featured in the programme. They stated that the production company had contacted them ahead of the 20th series taking place in the UK, and had advised that consideration should be given to using welfare-friendly alternatives to animals in the Bushtucker trials, but that it was "really disappointed" that animals were still planned to be used in the trials. It recommended viewers could contact Ofcom, or ITV directly if they wanted to take action.

In November 2020, rural crime officers from North Wales Police began investigations into the ITV network after TV presenter and naturalist Iolo Williams complained that non-native insects, used in the show at Gwrych Castle, could escape and pose a threat to ecosystems. Gwrych Castle woods is a site of special scientific interest (SSSI), as is the nearby Coed y Gopa, managed by the Woodland Trust. Natural Resources Wales, which is responsible for regulating the release of non-native species did not receive an application from ITV to release non-native species. The release of species without a licence would be an offence under the Wildlife and Countryside Act. ITV said the programme "complies with animal welfare law concerning the use of animals, and we are proud of our exemplary production practices".

In November 2025, People for the Ethical Treatment of Animals called on ITV to "stop tormenting animals, no matter how small or scary to some" following a trial in which contestants had to search for stars in a box of ants, while also having their heads in boxes containing snakes. The charity added that the programme "inflicts severe stress and trauma on sensitive animals, manhandled or crushed while exposed to screaming humans."

== Series overview ==
Ant & Dec have presented every series since it began in 2002, with the exception of the eighteenth series in 2018 when, due to McPartlin taking a break from television presenting duties, Declan Donnelly instead co-presented with Holly Willoughby. The first series of the programme was broadcast in the summer, the second of which followed in the spring of 2003 before a third and fourth were aired in 2004. Since the latter series, it has retained the November slot in the ITV schedules. The series originally ran for roughly two weeks (15 days) but was later extended to run for three weeks (21–23 days).

Series	Campmates	Location	Episodes	Originally released		Winner	Runner-up	Third place	Avg. viewers (millions)
Series	Campmates	Location	Episodes	First released	Last released	Winner	Runner-up	Third place	Avg. viewers (millions)
1	8	Queensland, Australia	15	25 August 2002	8 September 2002	Tony Blackburn	Tara Palmer-Tomkinson	Christine Hamilton	7.58
2	10	New South Wales, Australia	19	28 April 2003	12 May 2003	Phil Tufnell	John Fashanu	Linda Barker	8.55
3	10	New South Wales, Australia	17	26 January 2004	9 February 2004	Kerry Katona	Jennie Bond	Peter Andre	11.02
4	11	New South Wales, Australia	18	21 November 2004	6 December 2004	Joe Pasquale	Paul Burrell	Fran Cosgrave	8.66
5	12	New South Wales, Australia	16	20 November 2005	5 December 2005	Carol Thatcher	Sheree Murphy	Sid Owen	9.42
6	12	New South Wales, Australia	22	13 November 2006	1 December 2006	Matt Willis	Myleene Klass	Jason Donovan	8.01
7	11	New South Wales, Australia	22	12 November 2007	30 November 2007	Christopher Biggins	Janice Dickinson	Jason "J" Brown	7.34
8	12	New South Wales, Australia	18	16 November 2008	5 December 2008	Joe Swash	Martina Navratilova	George Takei	8.78
9	13	New South Wales, Australia	19	15 November 2009	4 December 2009	Gino D'Acampo	Kim Woodburn	Jimmy White	9.37
10	13	New South Wales, Australia	19	14 November 2010	4 December 2010	Stacey Solomon	Shaun Ryder	Jenny Eclair	10.36
11	13	New South Wales, Australia	19	13 November 2011	3 December 2011	Dougie Poynter	Mark Wright	Fatima Whitbread	10.06
12	12	New South Wales, Australia	19	11 November 2012	1 December 2012	Charlie Brooks	Ashley Roberts	David Haye	10.47
13	12	New South Wales, Australia	20	17 November 2013	8 December 2013	Kian Egan	David Emanuel	Lucy Pargeter	11.11
14	12	New South Wales, Australia	20	16 November 2014	7 December 2014	Carl Fogarty	Jake Quickenden	Melanie Sykes	10.26
15	13	New South Wales, Australia	21	15 November 2015	6 December 2015	Vicky Pattison	George Shelley	Ferne McCann	9.86
16	12	New South Wales, Australia	21	13 November 2016	4 December 2016	Scarlett Moffatt	Joel Dommett	Adam Thomas	10.42
17	12	New South Wales, Australia	22	19 November 2017	10 December 2017	Georgia Toffolo	Jamie Lomas	Iain Lee	9.96
18	11	New South Wales, Australia	22	18 November 2018	9 December 2018	Harry Redknapp	Emily Atack	John Barrowman	12.18
19	12	New South Wales, Australia	22	17 November 2019	8 December 2019	Jacqueline Jossa	Andy Whyment	Roman Kemp	10.59
20	12	Abergele, Wales	20	15 November 2020	4 December 2020	Giovanna Fletcher	Jordan North	Vernon Kay	11.05
21	12	Abergele, Wales	19	21 November 2021	12 December 2021	Danny Miller	Simon Gregson	Frankie Bridge	7.61
22	12	New South Wales, Australia	22	6 November 2022	27 November 2022	Jill Scott	Owen Warner	Matt Hancock	10.94
23	12	New South Wales, Australia	22	19 November 2023	10 December 2023	Sam Thompson	Tony Bellew	Nigel Farage	8.35
24	12	New South Wales, Australia	22	17 November 2024	8 December 2024	Danny Jones	Coleen Rooney	Rev. Richard Coles	8.60
25	12	New South Wales, Australia	22	16 November 2025	7 December 2025	Angryginge	Tom Read Wilson	Shona McGarty	7.99
26	12	New South Wales, Australia	22	16 November 2026	7 December 2026	TBA	TBA	TBA	TBA

Key
Winner – King or Queen of the Jungle/Castle
Runner-up
Third place
Walked/withdrew or withdrawn by producers
Medically discharged
Late arrival

=== Series 1 (2002) ===
The first series consisted of 8 contestants, and was broadcast from 25 August to 8 September 2002.

Celebrity	Known for	Entered	Exited	Finished
Tony Blackburn	BBC Radio 1 DJ	Day 1	Day 15	1st
Tara Palmer-Tomkinson	Socialite, model, columnist & television presenter	Day 1	Day 15	2nd
Christine Hamilton	TV personality & wife of Neil Hamilton	Day 1	Day 14	3rd
Nell McAndrew	Glamour model & television presenter	Day 1	Day 13	4th
Rhona Cameron	Comedian	Day 1	Day 12	5th
Darren Day	Actor & singer	Day 1	Day 11	6th
Nigel Benn	Former Middleweight champion boxer	Day 1	Day 10	7th
Uri Geller	Magician, TV personality & self-proclaimed psychic	Day 1	Day 9	8th

=== Series 2 (2003) ===
The second series consisted of 10 contestants, and was broadcast from 28 April to 12 May 2003.

Celebrity	Known for	Entered	Exited	Finished
Phil Tufnell	Former England cricketer	Day 1	Day 15	1st
John "Fash" Fashanu	Former England striker & television presenter	Day 1	Day 15	2nd
Linda Barker	Changing Rooms presenter & interior designer	Day 1	Day 15	3rd
Wayne Sleep	Royal Ballet dancer	Day 1	Day 14	4th
Antony Worrall Thompson	Celebrity chef	Day 1	Day 13	5th
Toyah Willcox	Singer-songwriter & actress	Day 1	Day 12	6th
Catalina Guirado	Model & reality television star	Day 1	Day 11	7th
Chris Bisson	East Is East actor	Day 1	Day 10	8th
Danniella Westbrook	Former EastEnders actress	Day 1	Day 9	9th
Siân Lloyd	Television weather reporter	Day 1	Day 8	10th

=== Series 3 (2004) ===
The third series consisted of 10 contestants, and was broadcast from 26 January to 9 February 2004.

Celebrity	Known for	Entered	Exited	Finished
Kerry Katona	Atomic Kitten singer	Day 1	Day 16	1st
Jennie Bond	BBC royal correspondent	Day 1	Day 16	2nd
Peter Andre	Pop singer	Day 1	Day 16	3rd
Lord Brocket	Television presenter	Day 1	Day 15	4th
Katie "Jordan" Price	Glamour model	Day 1	Day 14	5th
Alex Best	Glamour model & ex-wife of George Best	Day 1	Day 13	6th
John Lydon	Sex Pistols band member & presenter	Day 1	Day 11	7th
Neil "Razor" Ruddock	Former England footballer	Day 1	Day 11	8th
Diane Modahl	Olympic middle-distance runner	Day 1	Day 10	9th
Mike Read	Radio DJ & journalist	Day 1	Day 9	10th

=== Series 4 (2004) ===
The fourth series consisted of 11 contestants, and was broadcast from 21 November to 6 December 2004.

Celebrity	Known for	Entered	Exited	Finished
Joe Pasquale	Comedian	Day 1	Day 18	1st
Paul Burrell	Former Royal Household butler	Day 1	Day 18	2nd
Fran Cosgrave	Nightclub manager, television personality & bodyguard	Day 1	Day 18	3rd
Janet Street-Porter	Broadcaster & journalist	Day 1	Day 17	4th
Sophie Anderton	Glamour model	Day 1	Day 15	5th
Antonio Fargas	Starsky & Hutch actor	Day 1	Day 14	6th
Sheila Ferguson	The Three Degrees singer	Day 1	Day 13	7th
Vic Reeves	Comedian	Day 5	Day 12	8th
Nancy Sorrell	Model & television presenter	Day 1	Day 11	9th
Natalie Appleton	All Saints singer	Day 1	Day 10	10th
Brian Harvey	East 17 singer	Day 2	Day 7	11th

=== Series 5 (2005) ===
The fifth series consisted of 12 contestants, and was broadcast from 20 November to 5 December 2005.

Celebrity	Known for	Entered	Exited	Finished
Carol Thatcher	Journalist, author & daughter of Margaret Thatcher	Day 1	Day 18	1st
Sheree Murphy	Former Emmerdale actress	Day 1	Day 18	2nd
Sid Owen	Former EastEnders actor & singer	Day 1	Day 18	3rd
Jimmy Osmond	The Osmonds singer & actor	Day 1	Day 17	4th
Bobby Ball	Cannon and Ball comedian & actor	Day 6	Day 16	5th
Antony Costa	Blue singer	Day 1	Day 15	6th
Jenny Frost	Atomic Kitten singer	Day 1	Day 14	7th
David Dickinson	Former Bargain Hunt presenter	Day 1	Day 12	8th
Kimberley Davies	Former Neighbours actress	Day 1	Day 11	9th
Jilly Goolden	Wine critic & journalist	Day 1	Day 11	10th
Tommy Cannon	Cannon and Ball comedian	Day 6	Day 10	11th
Elaine Lordan	Former EastEnders actress	Day 1	Day 1	12th

=== Series 6 (2006) ===
The sixth series consisted of 12 contestants, and was broadcast from 13 November to 1 December 2006.

Team Base Camp
Team Snake Rock

Celebrity	Known for	Entered	Exited	Finished
Matt Willis	Busted band member	Day 1	Day 19	1st
Myleene Klass	Hear'Say singer	Day 1	Day 19	2nd
Jason Donovan	Neighbours actor & singer	Day 1	Day 19	3rd
David Gest	Music promoter & television producer	Day 1	Day 18	4th
Dean Gaffney	Former EastEnders actor	Day 5	Day 18	5th
Jan Leeming	Newsreader	Day 1	Day 17	6th
Malandra Burrows	Former Emmerdale actress	Day 6	Day 16	7th
Phina Oruche	Footballer's Wives actress	Day 1	Day 15	8th
Lauren Booth	Broadcaster, journalist & activist	Day 1	Day 14	9th
Faith Brown	Comedian & impressionist	Day 1	Day 13	10th
Scott Henshall	Fashion designer	Day 1	Day 12	11th
Toby Anstis	Global Radio presenter	Day 1	Day 11	12th

=== Series 7 (2007) ===
The seventh series consisted of 11 contestants, and was broadcast from 12 to 30 November 2007.

Team Croc Creek
Team Snake Rock
Entered after contestants were brought together

Celebrity	Known for	Entered	Exited	Finished
Christopher Biggins	Film, television & stage actor	Day 5	Day 20	1st
Janice Dickinson	Supermodel	Day 1	Day 20	2nd
Jason "J" Brown	Former 5ive singer	Day 1	Day 20	3rd
Cerys Matthews	Catatonia singer & radio presenter	Day 1	Day 19	4th
Gemma Atkinson	Hollyoaks actress & glamour model	Day 1	Day 18	5th
Anna Ryder Richardson	Changing Rooms presenter & interior designer	Day 1	Day 16	6th
Rodney Marsh	Retired England footballer	Day 1	Day 15	7th
John Burton-Race	Celebrity chef	Day 1	Day 14	8th
Lynne Franks	Spokeswoman & writer	Day 1	Day 13	9th
Katie Hopkins	The Apprentice contestant	Day 2	Day 12	10th
Marc Bannerman	EastEnders actor	Day 1	Day 11	11th

=== Series 8 (2008) ===
The eighth series consisted of 12 contestants, and was broadcast from 16 November to 5 December 2008.

Home Camp
Away Camp
Entered after contestants were brought together.

Celebrity	Known for	Entered	Exited	Finished
Joe Swash	EastEnders actor	Day 1	Day 21	1st
Martina Navratilova	Retired professional tennis player	Day 1	Day 21	2nd
George Takei	Former Star Trek actor	Day 1	Day 21	3rd
David Van Day	Former Dollar singer	Day 5	Day 20	4th
Simon Webbe	Blue singer	Day 1	Day 19	5th
Nicola McLean	Glamour model	Day 1	Day 18	6th
Brian Paddick	Liberal Democrat & retired policeman	Day 1	Day 17	7th
Esther Rantzen	Television presenter & charity campaigner	Day 1	Day 16	8th
Timmy Mallett	Children's television presenter	Day 5	Day 15	9th
Carly Zucker	Model & wife of Joe Cole	Day 1	Day 14	10th
Dani Behr	Television presenter, model & singer	Day 1	Day 13	11th
Robert Kilroy-Silk	Former Labour Party politician & television presenter	Day 1	Day 12	12th

=== Series 9 (2009) ===
The ninth series consisted of 13 contestants, and was broadcast from 15 November to 4 December 2009.

Base Camp
Camp Exile
Left before camp was split

Celebrity	Known for	Entered	Exited	Finished
Gino D'Acampo	Chef & television presenter	Day 1	Day 21	1st
Kim Woodburn	How Clean Is Your House? presenter	Day 1	Day 21	2nd
Jimmy White	Professional snooker player	Day 1	Day 21	3rd
Justin Ryan	Interior designer & television presenter	Day 1	Day 20	4th
Stuart Manning	Former Hollyoaks actor	Day 1	Day 19	5th
Sabrina Washington	Mis-Teeq singer	Day 1	Day 18	6th
George Hamilton	Film actor	Day 1	Day 17	7th
Joe Bugner	Former Heavyweight boxer	Day 4	Day 16	8th
Sam Fox	Former model & singer	Day 1	Day 14	9th
Colin McAllister	Interior designer & television presenter	Day 1	Day 11	10th
Lucy Benjamin	Former EastEnders actress	Day 1	Day 10	11th
Katie Price	Model, television personality & businesswoman	Day 2	Day 9	12th
Camilla Dallerup	Former Strictly Come Dancing professional dancer	Day 1	Day 4	13th

=== Series 10 (2010) ===
The tenth series consisted of 13 contestants, and was broadcast 14 November to 4 December 2010. This was the first series to air on ITV HD.

Camp Sheila
Camp Bruce
Entered after contestants were brought together

Celebrity	Known for	Entered	Exited	Finished
Stacey Solomon	The X Factor contestant	Day 1	Day 21	1st
Shaun Ryder	Happy Mondays singer	Day 1	Day 21	2nd
Jenny Eclair	Comedian & novelist	Day 4	Day 20	3rd
Dom Joly	Comedian	Day 4	Day 19	4th
Kayla Collins	Playboy model	Day 1	Day 19	5th
Aggro Santos	Rapper	Day 1	Day 18	6th
Linford Christie	Retired Olympic sprinter	Day 1	Day 17	7th
Gillian McKeith	Nutritionist, author & television presenter	Day 1	Day 16	8th
Britt Ekland	Actress	Day 1	Day 15	9th
Alison Hammond	This Morning presenter & Big Brother 3 housemate	Day 6	Day 15	10th
Lembit Öpik	Former Liberal Democrats MP	Day 1	Day 13	11th
Sheryl Gascoigne	Author & ex-wife of Paul Gascoigne	Day 1	Day 12	12th
Nigel Havers	Film & television actor	Day 1	Day 9	13th

=== Series 11 (2011) ===
The eleventh series consisted of 13 contestants, and was broadcast from 13 November to 3 December 2011.

Team Snake Rock
Team Croc Creek
Entered after contestants were brought together

Celebrity	Known for	Entered	Exited	Finished
Dougie Poynter	McFly bassist	Day 1	Day 21	1st
Mark Wright	The Only Way is Essex star	Day 1	Day 21	2nd
Fatima Whitbread	Olympic javelin thrower	Day 1	Day 20	3rd
Antony Cotton	Coronation Street actor	Day 1	Day 20	4th
Willie Carson	Former horse racing jockey	Day 1	Day 19	5th
Crissy Rock	Benidorm actress	Day 1	Day 18	6th
Emily Scott	Swimwear model	Day 5	Day 17	7th
Jessica-Jane Clement	Glamour model, actress & television presenter	Day 1	Day 16	8th
Lorraine Chase	Former Emmerdale actress	Day 1	Day 15	9th
Pat Sharp	Television & radio broadcaster	Day 3	Day 14	10th
Sinitta	80s pop singer	Day 3	Day 13	11th
Stefanie Powers	Stage & screen actress	Day 1	Day 12	12th
Freddie Starr	Comedian & impressionist	Day 1	Day 3	13th

=== Series 12 (2012) ===
The twelfth series consisted of 12 contestants, and was broadcast from 11 November to 1 December 2012.

Team Snake Rock
Team Croc Creek
Entered after contestants were brought together

Celebrity	Known for	Entered	Exited	Finished
Charlie Brooks	EastEnders actress	Day 1	Day 21	1st
Ashley Roberts	The Pussycat Dolls singer	Day 1	Day 21	2nd
David Haye	Heavyweight boxer	Day 1	Day 20	3rd
Eric Bristow	Professional darts player	Day 1	Day 19	4th
Hugo Taylor	Made in Chelsea star	Day 1	Day 18	5th
Rosemary Shrager	Celebrity chef	Day 5	Day 17	6th
Helen Flanagan	Coronation Street actress	Day 1	Day 16	7th
Colin Baker	Former Doctor Who actor	Day 1	Day 15	8th
Linda Robson	Birds of a Feather actress and Loose Women panellist	Day 1	Day 13	9th
Limahl	Kajagoogoo band member	Day 5	Day 12	10th
Nadine Dorries	Conservative Party politician and MP	Day 1	Day 11	11th
Brian Conley	Television presenter, actor & comedian	Day 1	Day 9	12th

=== Series 13 (2013) ===
The thirteenth series consisted of 12 contestants, and was broadcast from 17 November to 8 December 2013.

Team Snake Rock
Team Croc Creek
Entered after contestants were brought together

Celebrity	Known for	Entered	Exited	Finished
Kian Egan	Westlife singer	Day 1	Day 22	1st
David Emanuel	Royal fashion designer	Day 1	Day 22	2nd
Lucy Pargeter	Emmerdale actress	Day 1	Day 21	3rd
Joey Essex	The Only Way is Essex star	Day 1	Day 20	4th
Amy Willerton	Miss Universe Great Britain 2013	Day 1	Day 20	5th
Rebecca Adlington	Former Olympic swimmer	Day 1	Day 19	6th
Alfonso Ribeiro	The Fresh Prince of Bel-Air actor	Day 1	Day 19	7th
Steve Davis	Former professional snooker player	Day 1	Day 18	8th
Matthew Wright	The Wright Stuff presenter	Day 1	Day 17	9th
Vincent Simone	Former Strictly Come Dancing professional dancer	Day 5	Day 17	10th
Laila Morse	EastEnders actress	Day 1	Day 16	11th
Annabel Giles	Television presenter & author	Day 5	Day 15	12th

=== Series 14 (2014) ===
The fourteenth series consisted of 12 contestants, and was broadcast from 16 November to 7 December 2014. On 11 November, the full list of celebrities was confirmed by ITV.

Team Croc Creek/Rescuer
Team Celebrity Slammer
Entered after contestants were brought together

Celebrity	Known for	Entered	Exited	Finished
Carl "Foggy" Fogarty	Retired World Superbike racer	Day 1	Day 23	1st
Jake Quickenden	The X Factor contestant	Day 5	Day 23	2nd
Melanie Sykes	Television presenter & model	Day 1	Day 23	3rd
Edwina Currie	Former Conservative Party politician & author	Day 5	Day 22	4th
Tinchy Stryder	Rapper	Day 1	Day 21	5th
Kendra Wilkinson	Playboy model & reality television star	Day 1	Day 21	6th
Vicki Michelle	'Allo 'Allo! actress	Day 1	Day 20	7th
Michael Buerk	Newsreader & war journalist	Day 1	Day 19	8th
Nadia Forde	Model, television personality & singer	Day 1	Day 18	9th
Jimmy Bullard	Former Premier League footballer	Day 1	Day 17	10th
Craig Charles	Actor, comedian & presenter	Day 1	Day 4	11th
Gemma Collins	The Only Way is Essex star	Day 1	Day 3	12th

=== Series 15 (2015) ===
The fifteenth series consisted of 13 contestants and was broadcast from 15 November to 6 December 2015.

Red Team (Leader: Tony Hadley)
Yellow Team (Leader: Susannah Constantine)
Entered after contestants were brought together

Celebrity	Known for	Entered	Exited	Finished
Vicky Pattison	Geordie Shore star	Day 3	Day 22	1st
George Shelley	Union J singer	Day 1	Day 22	2nd
Ferne McCann	The Only Way is Essex star	Day 3	Day 22	3rd
Kieron Dyer	Former Premier League footballer	Day 1	Day 21	4th
Jorgie Porter	Hollyoaks actress	Day 1	Day 21	5th
Tony Hadley	Spandau Ballet singer	Day 1	Day 20	6th
Duncan Bannatyne	Former Dragons' Den panelist & entrepreneur	Day 1	Day 19	7th
Lady Colin "Lady C" Campbell	Royal biographer & socialite	Day 1	Day 17	8th
Chris Eubank	Retired professional boxer	Day 1	Day 17	9th
Yvette Fielding	Blue Peter & Most Haunted presenter	Day 1	Day 16	10th
Brian Friedman	Dancer & The X Factor choreographer	Day 1	Day 15	11th
Susannah Constantine	Fashion journalist	Day 1	Day 13	12th
Spencer Matthews	Made in Chelsea star	Day 3	Day 5	13th

=== Series 16 (2016) ===
The sixteenth series consisted of 12 contestants, and was broadcast from 13 November to 4 December 2016.

Jungle Celebs
City Celebs
Entered after contestants were brought together

Celebrity	Known for	Entered	Exited	Finished
Scarlett Moffatt	Gogglebox star	Day 1	Day 22	1st
Joel Dommett	Stand-up comedian	Day 1	Day 22	2nd
Adam Thomas	Emmerdale actor	Day 1	Day 22	3rd
Sam Quek	Olympic hockey gold medallist	Day 1	Day 21	4th
Wayne Bridge	Former Premier League footballer	Day 1	Day 20	5th
Martin Roberts	Homes Under the Hammer presenter	Day 5	Day 20	6th
Larry Lamb	EastEnders & Gavin & Stacey actor	Day 1	Day 19	7th
Carol Vorderman	Television presenter & former Countdown co-host	Day 1	Day 18	8th
Jordan Banjo	Diversity dance troupe member	Day 1	Day 17	9th
Ola Jordan	Former Strictly Come Dancing professional dancer	Day 1	Day 16	10th
Lisa Snowdon	Fashion model & television presenter	Day 1	Day 15	11th
Danny Baker	Television & radio presenter	Day 5	Day 13	12th

=== Series 17 (2017) ===
The seventeenth series consisted of 12 contestants, and was broadcast from 19 November to 10 December 2017.

Team Snake Rock
Team Croc Creek
Left before camp was split

Celebrity	Known for	Entered	Exited	Finished
Georgia "Toff" Toffolo	Made in Chelsea star	Day 1	Day 22	1st
Jamie Lomas	Hollyoaks actor	Day 1	Day 22	2nd
Iain Lee	Television & radio presenter	Day 5	Day 22	3rd
Jennie McAlpine	Coronation Street actress	Day 1	Day 21	4th
Amir Khan	Professional boxer	Day 1	Day 20	5th
Dennis Wise	Former Premier League footballer	Day 1	Day 19	6th
Stanley Johnson	Politician, author & father of Boris Johnson	Day 1	Day 18	7th
Vanessa White	The Saturdays singer	Day 1	Day 17	8th
Rebekah "Becky" Vardy	Media personality & wife of Jamie Vardy	Day 1	Day 16	9th
Kezia "Kez" Dugdale	Politician & former Scottish Labour leader	Day 5	Day 15	10th
Shappi Khorsandi	Stand-up comedian	Day 1	Day 13	11th
Jack Maynard	DJ, YouTube personality and brother of Conor Maynard	Day 1	Day 3	12th

=== Series 18 (2018) ===
The eighteenth series consisted of 11 contestants, and was broadcast from 18 November to 9 December 2018. On 9 August 2018, McPartlin confirmed that he would not be presenting the series as he continued to receive treatment after being admitted to rehab in March. On 29 August, ITV confirmed that Holly Willoughby would replace McPartlin as co-presenter alongside Donnelly. The lineup was confirmed on 12 November.

Team Snake Rock
Team Croc Creek
Entered after contestants were brought together

Celebrity	Known for	Entered	Exited	Finished
Harry Redknapp	Football manager	Day 1	Day 22	1st
Emily Atack	Former The Inbetweeners actress	Day 1	Day 22	2nd
John Barrowman	Actor & singer	Day 1	Day 22	3rd
Fleur East	Singer & The X Factor runner-up	Day 1	Day 21	4th
James McVey	The Vamps guitarist	Day 1	Day 20	5th
Nick Knowles	DIY SOS presenter	Day 1	Day 19	6th
Anne Hegerty	The Chase star	Day 1	Day 18	7th
Rita Simons	Former EastEnders actress	Day 1	Day 17	8th
Sair Khan	Coronation Street actress	Day 1	Day 16	9th
Malique Thompson-Dwyer	Hollyoaks actor	Day 1	Day 15	10th
Noel Edmonds	Television & radio presenter	Day 5	Day 13	11th

=== Series 19 (2019) ===
The nineteenth series consisted of 12 contestants, and was broadcast from 17 November to 8 December 2019. McPartlin rejoined the series as co-presenter, following a one-year hiatus.

Team Snake Rock
Team Croc Creek
Entered after contestants were brought together

Celebrity	Known for	Entered	Exited	Finished
Jacqueline Jossa	Former EastEnders actress	Day 1	Day 22	1st
Andy Whyment	Coronation Street actor	Day 5	Day 22	2nd
Roman Kemp	Capital FM presenter	Day 1	Day 22	3rd
Kate Garraway	Good Morning Britain presenter	Day 1	Day 21	4th
Nadine Coyle	Girls Aloud singer	Day 1	Day 20	5th
Caitlyn Jenner	Olympic athlete & reality television personality	Day 1	Day 20	6th
Myles Stephenson	Rak-Su singer	Day 1	Day 19	7th
Ian Wright	Former footballer & television presenter	Day 1	Day 18	8th
James Haskell	Former rugby union player	Day 1	Day 17	9th
Cliff Parisi	Call the Midwife & former EastEnders actor	Day 5	Day 16	10th
Andrew Maxwell	Stand-up comedian & Ex on the Beach narrator	Day 1	Day 15	11th
Adele Roberts	BBC Radio 1 presenter & Big Brother 3 housemate	Day 1	Day 13	12th

=== Series 20 (2020) ===
The twentieth series of the show was confirmed in July 2020. This series was held in Gwrych Castle in North Wales owing to travel restrictions caused by the COVID-19 pandemic, affecting travel to Australia. Two weeks prior to the start of the series, all participants, crew, and presenters were isolated to ensure that social distancing was not needed during filming. The line-up was announced on 8 November 2020 during I'm a Celebrity: A Jungle Story.

Celebrity	Known for	Entered	Exited	Finished
Giovanna Fletcher	Author, presenter & blogger	Day 1	Day 20	1st
Jordan North	BBC Radio 1 presenter	Day 1	Day 20	2nd
Vernon Kay	Television & radio presenter	Day 1	Day 20	3rd
Shane Richie	EastEnders actor	Day 1	Day 19	4th
Mo Farah	Olympic long-distance runner & track athlete	Day 1	Day 18	5th
AJ Pritchard	Former Strictly Come Dancing professional dancer	Day 1	Day 18	6th
Jessica Plummer	Former EastEnders actress & Neon Jungle singer	Day 1	Day 17	7th
Russell Watson	Operatic tenor	Day 4	Day 17	8th
Beverley Callard	Coronation Street actress	Day 1	Day 16	9th
Victoria Derbyshire	Journalist & television presenter	Day 1	Day 16	10th
Ruthie Henshall	Musical theatre actress & singer	Day 4	Day 15	11th
Hollie Arnold	Paralympic javelin thrower	Day 1	Day 13	12th

=== Series 21 (2021) ===
As with series 20, due to COVID-19 travel restrictions, the series was filmed at Gwrych Castle in Abergele, Wales.

Team Castle Clink
Team Main Camp
Entered after contestants were brought together

Celebrity	Known for	Entered	Exited	Finished
Danny Miller	Emmerdale actor	Day 1	Day 20	1st
Simon Gregson	Coronation Street actor	Day 5	Day 20	2nd
Frankie Bridge	The Saturdays singer & Loose Women panellist	Day 1	Day 20	3rd
David Ginola	Former France footballer & pundit	Day 1	Day 19	4th
Matty Lee	Olympic diver	Day 1	Day 18	5th
Adam Woodyatt	EastEnders actor	Day 5	Day 18	6th
Louise Minchin	Former BBC Breakfast presenter	Day 1	Day 17	7th
Naughty Boy	DJ, record producer & musician	Day 1	Day 16	8th
Snoochie Shy	BBC Radio 1Xtra presenter	Day 1	Day 15	9th
Kadeena Cox	Paralympic athlete & cyclist	Day 1	Day 14	10th
Arlene Phillips	Choreographer & former Strictly Come Dancing judge	Day 1	Day 13	11th
Richard Madeley	Television presenter & journalist	Day 1	Day 5	12th

Madeley was forced to withdraw from the series after being taken to hospital due to an unspecified illness, and therefore breaking the show's COVID bubble.

=== Series 22 (2022) ===
In March 2022, it was reported that the series would return to Australia for the first time since series 19 following reopening of Australia's borders for international visitors in February 2022, which coincided with the show's 20th anniversary.

Celebrity	Known for	Entered	Exited	Finished
Jill Scott	Former England footballer	Day 1	Day 23	1st
Owen Warner	Former Hollyoaks actor	Day 1	Day 23	2nd
Matt Hancock	Conservative Party politician	Day 4	Day 23	3rd
Mike Tindall	Former England rugby player	Day 1	Day 22	4th
Seann Walsh	Stand-up comedian	Day 4	Day 21	5th
Chris Moyles	Radio & television presenter	Day 1	Day 20	6th
Babatúndé Aléshé	Actor & comedian	Day 1	Day 19	7th
Boy George	Culture Club singer	Day 1	Day 18	8th
Sue Cleaver	Coronation Street actress	Day 1	Day 17	9th
Scarlette Douglas	Former A Place in the Sun presenter	Day 1	Day 16	10th
Charlene White	ITV News & Loose Women presenter	Day 1	Day 14	11th
Olivia Attwood	Television personality	Day 1	Day 2	12th

=== Series 23 (2023) ===
Home Team
Away Team

Celebrity	Known for	Entered	Exited	Finished
Sam Thompson	Television personality & radio presenter	Day 1	Day 22	1st
Tony Bellew	Former professional boxer	Day 5	Day 22	2nd
Nigel Farage	Reform UK party leader & broadcaster	Day 1	Day 22	3rd
Josie Gibson	This Morning presenter & Big Brother 11 winner	Day 1	Day 21	4th
Marvin Humes	JLS singer & presenter	Day 1	Day 20	5th
Danielle Harold	Former EastEnders actress	Day 1	Day 19	6th
Nick Pickard	Hollyoaks actor	Day 1	Day 18	7th
Fred Sirieix	First Dates maître d'hôtel	Day 1	Day 17	8th
Nella Rose	YouTube personality & influencer	Day 1	Day 16	9th
Frankie Dettori	Horse racing jockey	Day 5	Day 15	10th
Jamie Lynn Spears	Zoey 101 actress & singer	Day 1	Day 11	11th
Grace Dent	Columnist & restaurant critic	Day 1	Day 9	12th

=== Series 24 (2024) ===
Celebrity	Known for	Entered	Exited	Finished
Danny Jones	McFly singer	Day 1	Day 22	1st
Coleen Rooney	Media personality & wife to Wayne Rooney	Day 1	Day 22	2nd
Rev. Richard Coles	Broadcaster, musician & Church of England priest	Day 5	Day 22	3rd
Oti Mabuse	Professional dancer & Dancing on Ice judge	Day 1	Day 21	4th
GK Barry	Social media personality	Day 1	Day 20	5th
Alan Halsall	Coronation Street actor	Day 1	Day 20	6th
Maura Higgins	Television personality & model	Day 5	Day 19	7th
Barry McGuigan	Former professional boxer & promoter	Day 1	Day 19	8th
Melvin Odoom	Television & radio presenter	Day 1	Day 17	9th
Tulisa	N-Dubz singer & former The X Factor judge	Day 1	Day 16	10th
Dean McCullough	BBC Radio 1 presenter	Day 1	Day 15	11th
Jane Moore	Journalist & Loose Women panellist	Day 1	Day 13	12th

=== Series 25 (2025) ===
Team Win City
Team Doomsville

Celebrity	Known for	Entered	Exited	Finished
Angryginge	Social media personality	Day 1	Day 22	1st
Tom Read Wilson	Celebs Go Dating client co-ordinator	Day 5	Day 22	2nd
Shona McGarty	Former EastEnders actress	Day 1	Day 22	3rd
Aitch	Rapper	Day 1	Day 21	4th
Lisa Riley	Emmerdale actress	Day 1	Day 20	5th
Jack Osbourne	Media personality	Day 1	Day 20	6th
Martin Kemp	Spandau Ballet bassist & actor	Day 1	Day 19	7th
Ruby Wax	Actress, comedian & television presenter	Day 1	Day 18	8th
Kelly Brook	Model, actress & presenter	Day 1	Day 17	9th
Vogue Williams	Media personality & presenter	Day 5	Day 16	10th
Eddie Kadi	Comedian & BBC Radio 1Xtra presenter	Day 1	Day 15	11th
Alex Scott	Former England footballer & television presenter	Day 1	Day 13	12th

=== Series 26 (2026) ===
Celebrity	Known for	Entered	Exited	Finished
Ade Adepitan	Paralympic wheelchair basketball player & television presenter	Day 1		
AJ Odudu	Television presenter	Day 1	Day 1 (Note: Odudu lost a head-to-head "elimination trial" so did not officially enter camp on the first day of the series, however it was subsequently revealed to be a fake elimination, and she returned two days later alongside late arrival Leigh Francis.)	
AJ Odudu	Television presenter	Day 4		
Chloe Burrows	Love Island finalist & media personality	Day 1		
Claire Sweeney	Actress, singer & television presenter	Day 1		
Jack Skipper	Stand-up comedian & social media personality	Day 1		
Joanna Page	Gavin & Stacey actress & television presenter	Day 1		
Leigh Francis	Comedian, television presenter & actor	Day 4		
Leomie Anderson	Model & former Glow Up: Britain's Next Make-Up Star presenter	Day 1		
Mariella Frostrup	Journalist & Loose Women panellist	Day 1		
Ricky Wilson	Kaiser Chiefs singer	Day 1		
Sharky	Social media personality & Beta Squad member	Day 1		
Wayne Rooney	Former England footballer & manager	Day 1		

== Spin-offs and specials ==
A number of various one-off compilation and retrospective programmes have been aired over the years on ITV2 but have since been discontinued, with the exception of the annual Coming Out special, retitled A Castle Story for the 2020 series, which followed the third series but was moved to the main ITV channel from the fourth series onwards and is still being produced as of 2025. This episode documents the immediate aftermath of the campmates leaving the jungle, often showing them reuniting with their loved ones, their first meals, reflections on their time in camp before a final reunion party.

=== ITV2 companion shows ===
==== Get Me Out of Here! NOW! (2002–2015) ====
A companion show, I'm a Celebrity...Get Me Out of Here! NOW!, was broadcast on ITV2 following every episode between 2002 and 2015. It had been aired since the first series, and featured a variety of presenters. The show was renamed and given the title I'm a Celebrity: Extra Camp in 2016.

==== Extra Camp (2016–2019) ====
The renamed companion show, I'm a Celebrity: Extra Camp was broadcast on ITV2 following each episode from 2016 to 2019. On 9 January 2020, it was announced that the series had been axed owing to high production costs.

==== The Daily Drop (2020) ====
On 20 October 2020, ITV announced that an online spin-off show called I'm a Celebrity...The Daily Drop would be aired alongside the 2020 series hosted by Vick Hope on ITV Hub. In October 2021, it was confirmed that The Daily Drop would not return in 2021.

==== Unpacked (2024–present) ====
In October 2024, it was confirmed that the show's spin-off would return, 4 years after being axed, and was given the new title I'm a Celebrity: Unpacked. It is presented by Joel Dommett, Sam Thompson and Kemi Rodgers.

=== I'm a Celebrity...South Africa (2023, 2026) ===
The spin-off series featuring celebrities who had competed in the show before, began airing on 24 April 2023, with the first series concluding on 12 May 2023. In April 2025, it was confirmed by ITV that the spin-off would return for a second series in 2026.

=== I'm a Celebrity...The Wild Frontier (2027) ===
In May 2026, media outlets began to report that ITV were planning a new spin-off series to mark the show's 25th anniversary. The Wild Frontier is expected to feature pairs of first-time contestants, such as celebrity duos or a famous name paired with a personal friend or family member, competing in trails and challenges as well as living together in the Canadian wilderness. Filming of this will reportedly take place in September within the Callaghan Valley which was home to the Whistler Olympic Park.

== Books ==
- Busk-Cowley, Mark (2014). I'm A Celebrity, Get Me Out Of Here!: The Inside Story. London: Bantam Press. ISBN 978-0-593-07348-3.
