= I'm a Celebrity: Unpacked series 2 =

Second series of I'm a Celebrity: Unpacked

I'm a Celebrity: Unpacked
- Series 2
- Presented by: Joel Dommett; Kemi Rodgers
- No. of days: 22
- No. of castaways: 12
- Winner: Angryginge
- Runner-up: Tom Read Wilson
- Location: Murwillumbah, New South Wales, Australia
- Starring: Alison Hammond; Keith Lemon; Melvin Odoom; Seann Walsh; Jill Scott; Andi Peters; Sam Thompson; Danny Jones
- No. of episodes: 22

Release
- Original network: ITV2
- Original release: 16 November – 7 December 2025

The second series of I'm a Celebrity: Unpacked was broadcast started on 16 November 2025 on ITV2. It is filmed in Murwillumbah, New South Wales. Joel Dommett, and Kemi Rodgers returned to host the spin-off show.

== Presenters ==
Joel Dommett returned to front the spin-off show I'm a Celebrity: Unpacked alongside radio presenter Kemi Rodgers.

== Guests ==
=== Guest Panelist ===
Guests
| Week | 1 | 2 | 3 |
|---|---|---|---|
| 1–4 | Alison Hammond | Keith Lemon | Melvin Odoom |
| 5 | Alison Hammond | Seann Walsh | —N/a |
| 6 | —N/a | Seann Walsh | —N/a |
| 7–9 | Seann Walsh | Jill Scott | —N/a |
| 10–11 | Andi Peters | Jill Scott | —N/a |
| 12–13 | Andi Peters | —N/a | —N/a |
| 14–17 | Sam Thompson | —N/a | —N/a |
| 18–21 | Danny Jones | —N/a | —N/a |
