= I'm a Celebrity...Get Me Out of Here! (British TV series) series 7 =

I'm a Celebrity...Get Me Out of Here!
- Series 7
- Presented by: Anthony McPartlin; Declan Donnelly
- No. of days: 20
- No. of castaways: 11
- Winner: Christopher Biggins
- Runner-up: Janice Dickinson
- Companion show: I'm a Celebrity...Get Me Out of Here! NOW!
- No. of episodes: 18

Release
- Original network: ITV
- Original release: 12 November – 30 November 2007

Series chronology
- ← Previous; Series 6 Next → Series 8

I'm a Celebrity...Get Me Out of Here! returned to ITV for its seventh series on Monday 12 November 2007 and ran until Friday 30 November 2007.

Series 6 winner Matt Willis and his fiancée, Emma Griffiths, presented spin-off show I'm a Celebrity...Get Me Out of Here! NOW! in Australia, while Mark Durden-Smith returned to front the United Kingdom segment of the show. The I'm a Celebrity...Exclusive teatime programme is not shown as part of the new series.

The official line-up was confirmed by ITV on 10 November 2007. The series was won by actor Christopher Biggins.

Janice Dickinson would return to the series fifteen years later to participate in I'm a Celebrity... South Africa alongside other former contestants to try to become the first I'm a Celebrity legend. She was forced to withdraw from the competition due to a head injury. She finished tenth overall.

With an average viewership of 7.34 million, the seventh series is the least watched in the show’s history.

== Celebrities ==
The official celebrity line-up was revealed on 10 November 2007. However, Malcolm McLaren immediately resigned from the show before entering the camp on the first day, stating he didn't have the time and intention to do the show. On Day 2, former The Apprentice contestant, Katie Hopkins was announced as his replacement and competed in the jungle throughout the series.

Celebrity	Famous for	Status
Christopher Biggins	Stage & screen actor	Winner on 30 November 2007
Janice Dickinson	Supermodel	Runner-up on 30 November 2007
Jason "J" Brown	Former 5ive singer	Third place on 30 November 2007
Cerys Matthews	Catatonia lead vocalist	Eliminated 8th on 29 November 2007
Gemma Atkinson	Hollyoaks actress & glamour model	Eliminated 7th on 28 November 2007
Anna Ryder Richardson	Changing Rooms presenter & interior designer	Eliminated 6th on 26 November 2007
Rodney Marsh	Former England footballer	Eliminated 5th on 25 November 2007
John Burton-Race	Celebrity chef	Eliminated 4th on 24 November 2007
Lynne Franks	UK public relations guru	Eliminated 3rd on 23 November 2007
Katie Hopkins	The Apprentice contestant	Eliminated 2nd on 22 November 2007
Marc Bannerman	Former EastEnders actor	Eliminated 1st on 21 November 2007

== Results and elimination ==
Indicates that the celebrity was immune from the public vote
Indicates that the celebrity received the fewest votes and was eliminated immediately (no bottom two)
Indicates that the celebrity was in the bottom two/three in the public vote

	Day 11	Day 12	Day 13	Day 14	Day 15	Day 16	Day 17	Day 18	Day 19	Day 20		Number of trials
	Day 11	Day 12	Day 13	Day 14	Day 15	Day 16	Day 17	Day 18	Day 19	Round 1	Round 2	Number of trials
Biggins	Safe	Safe	Safe	Safe	Safe	Safe	Safe	Safe	Safe	Safe	Winner (Day 20)	4
Janice	Safe	Safe	Safe	Safe	Safe	Safe	Safe	Safe	Safe	Safe	Runner-up (Day 20)	10
J	Safe	Safe	Safe	Safe	Safe	Bottom two	Safe	Safe	Bottom two	3rd	Eliminated (Day 20)	6
Cerys	Safe	Safe	Bottom two	Safe	Safe	Safe	Safe	Bottom two	4th	Eliminated (Day 19)		3
Gemma	Safe	Safe	Safe	Safe	Bottom two	Safe	Safe	5th	Eliminated (Day 18)			2
Anna	Immune	Bottom three	Safe	Bottom two	Safe	6th	Eliminated (Day 16)					1
Rodney	Immune	Safe	Safe	Safe	7th	Eliminated (Day 15)						3
John	Immune	Bottom three	Safe	8th	Eliminated (Day 14)							2
Lynne	Safe	Safe	9th	Eliminated (Day 13)								3
Katie	Bottom two	10th	Eliminated (Day 12)									1
Marc	8th	Eliminated (Day 11)										1
Bottom two/three (named in)	Katie; Marc	Anna; John; Katie	Cerys; Lynne	Anna; John	Gemma; Rodney	Anna; J	None	Cerys; Gemma	Cerys; J	None		
Eliminated	Marc; Fewest votes to save	Katie; Fewest votes to save	Lynne; Fewest votes to save	John; Fewest votes to save	Rodney; Fewest votes to save	Anna; Fewest votes to save	None	Gemma; Fewest votes to save	Cerys; Fewest votes to save	J Fewest votes to win	Janice; Fewest votes to win	
Eliminated	Marc; Fewest votes to save	Katie; Fewest votes to save	Lynne; Fewest votes to save	John; Fewest votes to save	Rodney; Fewest votes to save	Anna; Fewest votes to save	None	Gemma; Fewest votes to save	Cerys; Fewest votes to save	J Fewest votes to win	Biggins; Most votes to win	

== Bushtucker Trials ==
The contestants take part in daily trials to earn food. For the first three trials the two camps went head to head, only the winner of the trial's camp had any food. Tuesday, 20 November was the last time the public chose who took part in the trials from now on the contestants will have to decide for themselves who takes part in them because the public will vote for who leaves instead.

The public voted for who they wanted to face the trial
The contestants decided who did which trial
The trial was compulsory and neither the public or celebrities decided who took part

Trial number	Air date	Name of trial	Celebrity participation	Winner/Number of stars	Notes
1	12 November	Wheel of Misfortune	Marc; Janice	Marc	None
2	13 November	Rumble Rally	Rodney; Janice	Janice	None
3	14 November	Sushi Train of Pain	John; Janice	John	None
4	15 November	In Grave Danger	Katie	10/10 stars	^{1}
5 (Live)	15 November	Jungle Jeopardy	Janice	7/11 stars	^{2}
5 (Live)	15 November	Jungle Jeopardy	Biggins	7/11 stars	^{2}
6	17 November	Nip/Pluck	Janice; Lynne	7/11 stars	None
7	18 November	Catch a Crawling Star	Janice; Rodney	2/11 stars	^{3}
8	19 November	The Tunnel of Terror	Lynne	5/11 stars	^{1}
9	20 November	Uneasy Rider	'J'; Janice	10/11 stars	None
10	21 November	Jungle Sweetshop	Janice; Lynne	9/11 stars	^{4}
11	22 November	Bat out of Hell	Cerys; Gemma	6/10 stars	None
12	23 November	Dreaded Water	Anna; Rodney	9/9 stars	None
13	24 November	Dreadful Dropping	'J'; John	6/8 stars	None
14	25 November	Web Sight	Biggins	7/7 stars	None
15	26 November	The Terror Train	Gemma 'J'	3/6 stars	None
16	27 November	Dam Vines	Cerys	2/5 stars	None
17	28 November	Tabletop Terror	'J'	5/5 stars	None
18	29 November	Celebrity Cyclone	Cerys; Biggins 'J'; Janice	3/4 stars	None
19	30 November	Stakeout	Janice	5/5 stars	None
20	30 November	Bushtucker Bonanza	Biggins	5/5 stars	None
21	30 November	Flash Flood	'J'	4/5 stars	None

=== Notes ===
^1 Janice was ruled out of this trial on medical grounds.
^2 Biggins was a new addition to the show. The public did not vote for him to take part in the trial, but he participated in the trial as a lifeline for Janice.
^3 Biggins was ruled out of this trial on medical grounds.
^4 Rodney was ruled out of this trial on medical grounds.

== Star count ==
Celebrity	Number of Stars Earned	Percentage
Anna Ryder Richardson	9/9 stars	100%
Christopher Biggins	22/27 stars	81%
Cerys Matthews	11/19 stars	58%
Gemma Atkinson	9/16 stars	56%
Jason "J" Brown	31/39 stars	79%
Janice Dickinson	43/64 stars	67%
John Burton-Race	6/8 stars	75%
Katie Hopkins	10/10 stars	100%
Lynne Franks	21/33 stars	64%
Marc Bannerman	—N/a	—N/a
Rodney Marsh	11/20 stars	55%

== Bush Battles ==
This year, the celebrities were all given a chance to win immunity from the first eviction. To do this they had to compete in a Bush Battle. The first battle consisted of 4 celebrities having to sit in a jeep. Whoever stayed in the jeep for the longest would win. After winning, John is known for saying "I am the victor." The second battle saw them each having a large egg timer. Whoever didn't let their egg timer run out would be the winner. The third battle was to stand tied to a tree holding a chain which would flush out frog spawn upon their head (they were chained to the tree). Whoever flushed out the substance last won.

Battle Number	Date	Name of Battle	Theme of Battle	Celebrities Taking Part	Winner
1	18 November 2007	'Are We Nearly There Yet'	Endurance and Patience	Katie, John, 'J' and Gemma	John
2	19 November 2007		Concentration	Lynne, Janice, Rodney and Biggins	Rodney
3	20 November 2007	'Hold Your Nerve'	Physical, Stamina and Balance	Cerys, Marc and Anna	Anna

== The Camps ==
=== Croc Creek ===
Croc Creek consisted of Anna Ryder Richardson, Cerys Matthews, John Burton Race, Marc Bannerman and Rodney Marsh.

When the 2 camps merged Croc Creek became base camp.

=== Snake Rock ===
Snake Rock was initially supposed to consist of Gemma Atkinson, Jason "J" Brown, Janice Dickinson, Lynne Franks and Malcolm McLaren, but McLaren quit the show and never made it into the camp. Katie Hopkins was put into Snake Rock on Day 2.

Snake Rock was abandoned once the two tribes became one, but it was used in the bush battles.

== Ratings ==
All ratings are taken from the UK Programme Ratings website, BARB.

Episode	Air date	Official rating (millions)	ITV weekly rank
1	12 November	9.16	10
2	13 November	6.88	27
3	14 November	7.42	23
4	15 November	6.96	25
5	15 November	6.60	31
6	16 November	5.00	43
7	17 November	7.95	19
8	18 November	7.55	22
9	19 November	8.04	16
10	20 November	7.39	24
11	21 November	6.28	34
12	22 November	6.96	28
13	22 November	6.71	31
14	23 November	7.27	26
15	24 November	7.61	22
16	25 November	7.81	20
17	26 November	8.33	15
18	27 November	6.97	27
19	28 November	7.61	24
20	29 November	6.93	28
21	29 November	7.22	24
22	30 November	8.84	12
Series average	2007	7.34	—N/a
Coming Out	4 December	5.12	18
