= I'm a Celebrity...Get Me Out of Here! (British TV series) series 1 =

I'm a Celebrity...Get Me Out of Here!
- Series 1
- Presented by: Anthony McPartlin; Declan Donnelly
- No. of days: 15
- No. of castaways: 8
- Winner: Tony Blackburn
- Runner-up: Tara Palmer-Tomkinson
- Location: Tully, Queensland, Australia
- Companion show: I'm a Celebrity...Get Me Out of Here! NOW!
- No. of episodes: 15

Release
- Original network: ITV
- Original release: 25 August – 8 September 2002

Series chronology
- Next → Series 2

The first series of I'm a Celebrity...Get Me Out of Here! was broadcast on ITV from 25 August 2002. Ant & Dec presented the main show on ITV, whilst Louise Loughman hosted the spin-off show I'm a Celebrity...Get Me Out of Here! NOW! on ITV2. The winner of this series was radio DJ Tony Blackburn with 55% of the final vote; it raised a total of £618,799 for the nominated charities, with Blackburn amassing £184,000 for the National Autistic Society.

In July 2002, London Weekend Television confirmed that a celebrity Survivor-style series was in the final stages of development and was provisionally titled Get Me Out of Here: I'm a Celebrity.

== Celebrities ==
The show began with eight celebrity contestants. They were:

Celebrity	Famous for	Status
Tony Blackburn	BBC Radio 1 presenter	Winner on 8 September 2002
Tara Palmer-Tomkinson	Socialite & television presenter	Runner-up on 8 September 2002
Christine Hamilton	Television personality & author	Eliminated 6th on 7 September 2002
Nell McAndrew	Glamour model	Eliminated 5th on 6 September 2002
Rhona Cameron	Comedian	Eliminated 4th on 5 September 2002
Darren Day	Actor, singer, & presenter	Eliminated 3rd on 4 September 2002
Nigel Benn	Former Middleweight boxer	Eliminated 2nd on 3 September 2002
Uri Geller	Television paranormalist	Eliminated 1st on 2 September 2002

== Results and elimination ==
Indicates that the celebrity received the fewest votes and was eliminated immediately (no bottom two)
Indicates that the celebrity was named as being in the bottom two
Indicates that the celebrity had the highest number of votes that day

	Day 9	Day 10	Day 11	Day 12	Day 13	Day 14	Day 15 Final	Trials
Tony	Safe	Safe	Safe	Safe	Safe	Safe	Winner (Day 15)	3
Tara	Safe	Safe	Safe	Safe	Safe	Safe	Runner-up (Day 15)	2
Christine	Safe	Safe	Bottom two	3rd	Bottom two	3rd	Eliminated (Day 14)	2
Nell	Safe	Safe	Safe	Safe	4th	Eliminated (Day 13)		1
Rhona	Safe	Bottom two	Safe	5th	Eliminated (Day 12)			1
Darren	Bottom two	Safe	6th	Eliminated (Day 11)				2
Nigel	Safe	7th	Eliminated (Day 10)					2
Uri	8th	Eliminated (Day 9)						1
Bottom two	Darren, Uri	Nigel, Rhona	Christine, Darren	None	Christine, Nell	None		
Eliminated	Uri; Fewest votes to save	Nigel; Fewest votes to save	Darren; Fewest votes to save	Rhona; Fewest votes to save	Nell; Fewest votes to save	Christine; Fewest votes to save	Tara; Fewest votes to win	
Eliminated	Uri; Fewest votes to save	Nigel; Fewest votes to save	Darren; Fewest votes to save	Rhona; Fewest votes to save	Nell; Fewest votes to save	Christine; Fewest votes to save	Tony; Most votes to win	

== Bushtucker Trials ==
The contestants take part in daily trials to earn food

The public voted for who they wanted to face the trial
The contestants decided who did which trial
The trial was compulsory and no-one decided who took part

Trial Number	Date	Name of Trial	Celebrity participation	Number of Stars
1	25 August	Jungle Shower	Tara	8/8 stars
2	26 August	Snake Surprise	Nigel	5/8 stars
3	30 August	Buried Alive	Rhona	6/8 stars
4	31 August	Bushtucker Bonanza	Uri	8/8 stars
5	1 September	Stinking Swamp	Darren	7/8 stars
6	2 September	Hell Holes	Darren	8/8 stars
7	2 September	Night Watch	Nigel	8/8 stars
8	4 September	Pig Chase	Christine	7/7 stars
9	4 September	Sneaky Snake Run	Tony	2/6 stars
10	5 September	Bucking Bull	Nell	5/5 stars
11	6 September	Spider Web	Tony	3/4 stars
12	7 September	Underwater Treasure Hunt	Christine	2/3 stars
13	8 September	Final Trial	Tara; Tony	2/2 stars

== Star count ==
Celebrity	Number of Stars Earned	Percentage
Christine Hamilton	9/9 stars	90%
Darren Day	15/15 stars	94%
Nell McAndrew	5/5 stars	100%
Nigel Benn	13/13 stars	81%
Rhona Cameron	6/8 stars	75%
Tara Palmer-Tomkinson	10/10 stars	100%
Tony Blackburn	7/12 stars	58%
Uri Geller	8/8 stars	100%

== Ratings ==
All ratings are taken from the UK Programme Ratings website, BARB.

Episode	Air date	Official rating (millions)	Weekly rank for all UK TV channels
1	25 August	6.71	21
2	26 August	6.89	21
3	27 August	6.14	30
4	28 August	6.46	27
5	29 August	7.01	20
6	30 August	7.23	18
7	31 August	6.70	24
8	1 September	7.27	17
9	2 September	7.97	20
10	3 September	7.98	19
11	4 September	8.72	15
12	5 September	7.89	21
13	6 September	7.66	25
14	7 September	8.09	18
15	8 September	10.95	8
Series average	2002	7.58	—N/a

== Home media ==
On 7 October 2002, a compilation of clips from the series was released on VHS and DVD by Video Collection International and Granada Media. Released as an "Unseen and Uncut" release, it contains some clips deemed to be too raunchy to be shown on TV.
