= Safeword (game show) =

- Genre: Comedy panel game
- Directed by: Steve Smith
- Presented by: Rick Edwards
- Starring: David Morgan; Katherine Ryan
- Country of origin: United Kingdom
- Original language: English
- No. of series: 2
- No. of episodes: 13

Production
- Executive producers: Abigail Adams; Gary Chippington
- Producer: Alan Thorpe
- Production location: Pacific Quay
- Editor: Matt Roberts
- Running time: 45 minutes (inc. adverts)
- Production companies: STV Studios and Motion Content Group

Original release
- Network: ITV2
- Release: 23 July 2015 – 7 July 2016

Safeword is a British television comedy panel game show that aired on ITV2 from 23 July 2015 to 7 July 2016 and is hosted by Rick Edwards.

== Gameplay ==
The show begins with the teams conjuring up a safeword; to aid them, they are shown two particularly humiliating photos from their life with a succinct caption selected from the "safe word generator". A safeword is then picked by the team.

The first round, Hacked, involves the social media accounts of the guests being handed over to the opposing teams. The more posts they can stomach being posted, the more points they receive.

The second round, Burned, involves the team captains mocking the other team's guest using an image and caption from the roulette until either the time ends or they uses their safeword. The team captains take it in turns; one captain will attack, and once the time ends, the other captain will get up and attack. The guest receives one point for surviving each captain's diatribe, with two points available to each guest.

The third round, Slam Down, involves the guests insulting each other, with each guest obtaining one point per insult delivered. If they are unable think of an insult, they may use their safeword, by doing so they delegate to their team captains who may then issue an insult on their behalf. For each caustic remark successfully delivered, a point is awarded. The guest with the most points at the end of this round wins the game; the guest that loses is subjected to "a swift and nasty exit": Edwards pulls a chain which flings the guest's seat backwards causing the guest to disappear into the scenery.

== Transmissions ==
Series	Start date	End date	Episodes
1	23 July 2015	3 September 2015	7
2	2 June 2016	7 July 2016	6

== Episodes ==
The coloured backgrounds denote the result of each of the shows:

indicates David's team won
indicates Katherine's team won
indicates the game ended in a draw

=== Series 1 (2015) ===
Episode	First broadcast	David's guests	Katherine's guests	Scores
1x01	23 July 2015	Joey Essex and Andrew Maxwell	David Haye and Tiff Stevenson	8–7
1x02	30 July 2015	Sinitta and Jason Byrne	Charlotte Crosby and Iain Stirling	11–12
1x03	6 August 2015	Tinchy Stryder and Russell Kane	Louie Spence and Johnny Cochrane	6–9
1x04	13 August 2015	Vicky Pattison and Matt Richardson	Ritchie Neville and Tom Craine	9–8
1x05	20 August 2015	Katie Price and Matthew Crosby	Joe Swash and Marlon Davis	10–11
1x06	27 August 2015	Louis Walsh and Tom Davis	Gemma Collins and Dane Baptiste	15–13
1x07	3 September 2015	Brian Belo and Vikki Stone	Hilary Devey and Bobby Mair	8–11

=== Series 2 (2016) ===
Episode	First broadcast	David's guests	Katherine's guests	Scores
2x01 (8)	2 June 2016	Brian McFadden and Tez Ilyas	Stacey Solomon and Phil Wang	18–19
2x02 (9)	9 June 2016	Lydia Bright and Tom Davis	Gaz Beadle and Bobby Mair	16–15
2x03 (10)	16 June 2016	Carol Vorderman and Patrick Monahan	Jamie Laing and Tiff Stevenson	16–15
2x04 (11)	23 June 2016	James Haskell and Dane Baptiste	Ferne McCann and Stephen Bailey	20–14
2x05 (12)	30 June 2016	Tom Parker and Matt Richardson	James Jordan and Jamali Maddix	
2x06 (13)	7 July 2016	Andrew Maxwell and Kate Garraway	Matthew Crosby and Tyger Drew-Honey	

== Scores ==
David	Katherine
Series wins (0 drawn)
0	1
Episode wins (0 drawn)
3	4

== Controversy ==
Between the broadcast of the first and second episodes contestant Sinitta berated the show, saying that she "hated Everything about your show. Language and topics were vile! Meant to only roast Me #cleverEditNeeded wish I'd walked out." In response whilst on Lorraine, Edwards said that he had "no sympathy for her" and that "she could have used her safe word".

== International adaptations ==
Country	Title	Host	Network	Production company	Premiere
United States	SafeWord	Terrence J	MTV → VH1	Matador Content	13 July 2017
