= David Morgan (comedian) =

British stand-up comedian

David Morgan is a British stand-up comedian from Solihull. They are best known for presenting a series of I'm a Celebrity...Get Me Out of Here! NOW! and for being a team captain on Safeword.

== Career ==
Morgan's early TV appearances include BBC Three's Sweat the Small Stuff, E4's Virtually Famous and Channel 5's Big Brother's Bit on the Side. In 2015, they took over from Rob Beckett to co-present I'm a Celebrity...Get Me Out of Here! NOW! alongside Joe Swash and Laura Whitmore for ITV2. They were also team captain for two series of ITV2's Safeword, opposite Katherine Ryan which aired in 2015/16, during which time they were a regular guest presenter on Virgin Radio. They regularly appeared on ITV1's Weekend show hosted by Aled Jones, and in 2018, they were a regular guest presenter on ITV1's Zoe Ball on Saturday/Sunday.

In 2018, it was announced that David would join the cast of Magic Mike Live at The London Hippodrome, conceived and co-directed by Channing Tatum. Magic Mike Live London opened on 10 November 2018 to positive reviews.

== Personal life ==
Morgan came out as non-binary in January 2021, and goes by they/them pronouns.
