= I'm a Celebrity...Get Me Out of Here! (British TV series) series 2 =

I'm a Celebrity...Get Me Out of Here!
- Series 2
- Presented by: Anthony McPartlin; Declan Donnelly
- No. of days: 15
- No. of castaways: 10
- Winner: Phil Tufnell
- Runner-up: John Fashanu
- Location: New South Wales, Australia
- Companion show: I'm a Celebrity...Get Me Out of Here! NOW!
- No. of episodes: 19

Release
- Original network: ITV
- Original release: 28 April – 12 May 2003

Series chronology
- ← Previous; Series 1 Next → Series 3

The second series of I'm a Celebrity... Get Me out of Here! was broadcast on ITV from 28 April to 12 May 2003.

Ant & Dec presented the main show on ITV, whilst Mark Durden-Smith and former contestant Tara Palmer-Tomkinson hosted the spin-off show I'm A Celebrity... Get Me Out of Here... Now! on ITV2. Live streaming was introduced for the first time this series and was broadcast overnight on ITV2.

The winner of this series was former English cricketer Phil Tufnell, who overcame John Fashanu and Linda Barker in the final. As winner of the series, Tufnell received £400,000 to donate to his chosen charity the Leukaemia Research Fund; he would return twenty years later to participate in I'm a Celebrity...South Africa alongside other former contestants to try to become the first I'm a Celebrity legend. Tuffnell finished fourth but was the highest placed former winner.

The series was sponsored by the energy drink V.

== Contestants ==
The show began with ten celebrity contestants:

Celebrity	Famous for	Status
Phil Tufnell	Former England cricketer	Winner on 12 May 2003
John "Fash" Fashanu	Former England footballer & television presenter	Runner-up on 12 May 2003
Linda Barker	Changing Rooms presenter & interior designer	Third place on 12 May 2003
Wayne Sleep	Dancer & choreographer	Eliminated 6th on 11 May 2003
Antony Worrall Thompson	Celebrity chef	Eliminated 5th on 10 May 2003
Toyah Willcox	Actress & singer	Eliminated 4th on 9 May 2003
Catalina Guirado	Model & TFI Friday star	Eliminated 3rd on 8 May 2003
Chris Bisson	Former Coronation Street actor	Eliminated 2nd on 7 May 2003
Danniella Westbrook	Former EastEnders actress	Withdrew on 6 May 2003
Siân Lloyd	ITV weather presenter	Eliminated 1st on 5 May 2003

== Results and elimination ==
Indicates that the celebrity received the most votes
Indicates that the celebrity was immediately eliminated (no bottom two/three)
Indicates that the celebrity was in the bottom two/three in the public vote

Celebrity	Day 8	Day 9	Day 10	Day 11	Day 12	Day 13	Day 14	Day 15		Trials
Celebrity	Day 8	Day 9	Day 10	Day 11	Day 12	Day 13	Day 14	Round 1	Round 2	Trials
Phil	Safe	Safe	Safe	Safe	Safe	Safe	Bottom two	Safe	Winner (Day 15)	3
Fash	Safe	Safe	Safe	Safe	Safe	Safe	Safe	Safe	Runner-up (Day 15)	6
Linda	Safe	Safe	Safe	Safe	Safe	Safe	Safe	3rd	Eliminated (Day 15)	3
Wayne	Safe	Safe	Safe	Safe	Safe	Safe	4th	Eliminated (Day 14)		1
Antony	Safe	Safe	Bottom two	Safe	Safe	5th	Eliminated (Day 13)			1
Toyah	Safe	Safe	Safe	Bottom two	6th	Eliminated (Day 12)				1
Catalina	Bottom two	Safe	Safe	7th	Eliminated (Day 11)					1
Chris	Safe	Safe	8th	Eliminated (Day 10)						0
Danniella	Safe	Safe	Withdrew (Day 9)							1
Siân	10th	Eliminated (Day 8)								0
Notes	None	^{1}	None							
Bottom two/three (named in)	Catalina, Sian	None	Antony, Chris	Catalina, Toyah	None		Phil, Wayne	None		
Eliminated	Siân; Fewest votes to save	None	Chris; Fewest votes to save	Catalina; Fewest votes to save	Toyah; Fewest votes to save	Antony; Fewest votes to save	Wayne; Fewest votes to save	Linda; Fewest votes to save	Fash; Fewest votes to win	
Eliminated	Siân; Fewest votes to save	None	Chris; Fewest votes to save	Catalina; Fewest votes to save	Toyah; Fewest votes to save	Antony; Fewest votes to save	Wayne; Fewest votes to save	Linda; Fewest votes to save	Phil; Most votes to win	

=== Notes ===
^1 There was no elimination on Day 9 due to Danniella walking out of the jungle.

== Bushtucker Trials ==
The contestants take part in daily trials to earn food

The public voted for who they wanted to face the trial
The contestants decided who did which trial
The trial was compulsory and neither the public or celebrities decided who took part

Trial Number	Date	Name of Trial	Celebrity participation	Number of Stars	Notes
1	29 April	Keep It in Your Pants	Fash	7/10 stars	—N/a
2	29 April	Croc Pit	Catalina	10/10 stars	—N/a
3	30 April	Rat Food Suit	Wayne	2/10 stars	—N/a
4	1 May	Bridge of Doom	Fash	8/10 stars	—N/a
5	2 May	Catch A Falling Star	Danniella	3/10 stars	—N/a
6	3 May	Snake Pit	Fash	4/10 stars	—N/a
7	4 May	Bobbing For Stars	Fash	9/10 stars	—N/a
8	5 May	What Lies Within	Antony	5/10 stars	—N/a
9	6 May	Shooting Star	Phil	8/9 stars	—N/a
10	7 May	Teatime in Hell	Toyah	5/8 stars	—N/a
11	8 May	Terror in the Trees	Linda	7/7 stars	—N/a
12	9 May	Jungle Slide	Phil	4/6 stars	—N/a
13	10 May	Wheel of Horror	Linda	5/5 stars	—N/a
14	11 May	Eel Helmet	Fash	4/4 stars	—N/a
15	12 May	Balance: Bushtucker Bonanza	Phil	5/5 stars	—N/a
16	12 May	Reach: The Log Bog	Fash	5/5 stars	—N/a
17	12 May	Determination: The Eel Transfer	Linda	4/5 stars	—N/a

== Star count ==
Celebrity	Number of Stars Earned	Percentage
Antony Worrall Thompson	5/10 stars	50%
Catalina Guirado	10/10 stars	100%
Chris Bisson	—N/a	—N/a
Danniella Westbrook	3/10 stars	30%
John Fashanu	37/49 stars	76%
Linda Barker	16/17 stars	94%
Phil Tufnell	17/20 stars	85%
Siân Lloyd	—N/a	—N/a
Toyah Willcox	5/8 stars	63%
Wayne Sleep	2/10 stars	20%

== Ratings ==
All ratings are taken from the UK Programme Ratings website, BARB.

Episode	Air date	Official rating (millions)	Weekly rank for all UK TV channels
1	28 April	10.31	10
2	29 April	9.06	18
3	30 April	9.90	11
4	1 May	9.63	14
5	2 May	8.15	21
6	3 May	7.44	29
7	4 May	8.31	23
8	5 May	10.13	11
9	5 May	5.49	40
10	6 May	8.77	18
11	7 May	10.04	12
12	8 May	8.83	16
13	8 May	5.30	43
14	9 May	8.54	20
15	9 May	5.15	47
16	10 May	8.24	24
17	10 May	6.00	34
18	11 May	10.46	10
19	12 May	12.73	4
Series average	2003	8.55	—N/a
