= Matt Brown (broadcaster) =

British television presenter

- Born: Matthew Brown; 14 August 1973 (age 52); Lancashire, England, UK
- Occupation: Television presenter
- Years active: 1999–present

Matthew Brown (born 14 August 1973) is a British television presenter.

== Career ==
He started out in 1999 hosting Nickelodeon UK along with Mike McClean, Simon Amstell, Mounya Khamlichi and Yiolanda Koppel, but is best known for presenting the ITV2 spin-off programmes Love Island Aftersun, which he hosted in 2005 with Celebrity Love Island winner Jayne Middlemiss in 2006, and I'm a Celebrity...Get Me Out of Here! NOW!, with Tara Palmer-Tomkinson. He also hosts the UK Top Ten on Eat Cinema, with Mohini Sule.

=== Radio ===
Matt is also a radio presenter, and in early 2007 could be heard on Capital Radio in London and 96 Trent FM in Nottinghamshire. Matt co-hosted the breakfast show for Fox FM (later Heart Oxfordshire) with Giselle Ruskin. As of 12/07/2010, Matt Brown hosted the Breakfast show alongside Michelle Jordan of the newly merged radio stations (Heart Berkshire and Heart Oxfordshire), namely Heart Thames Valley. Matt left Heart in 2016. As of September, 2017 he started hosting weekend afternoons on Magic FM.

=== Author ===
Matt is the author of the Compton Valance book series. The first of these, The Most Powerful Boy In The Universe, was published by Usborne in June 2014. The second book in the series, "The Time Travelling Sandwich Bites Back", was published in October, 2014. The third book, "Super F.A.R.T.s Versus The Master Of Time" was published in June, 2015 and the fourth book, "The Revenge of the Fancy Pants Time Pirate" was published in June, 2016. He has also released a new series of books which include: Aliens Invaded My Talent Show, Mutant Zombie Cursed My School Trip and Killer Vending Machines Wrecked My Lunch.

== Awards ==
Compton Valance: The Most Powerful Boy In The Universe has been shortlisted for BASH 2015, the Oxfordshire Book Award, the Coventry Inspiration Book Award and Reading Rampage 2015.
