= I'm a Celebrity...Get Me Out of Here! (British TV series) series 9 =

I'm a Celebrity...Get Me Out of Here!
- Series 9
- Presented by: Anthony McPartlin; Declan Donnelly
- No. of days: 21
- No. of castaways: 13
- Winner: Gino D'Acampo
- Runner-up: Kim Woodburn
- Companion show: I'm a Celebrity...Get Me Out of Here! NOW!
- No. of episodes: 20

Release
- Original network: ITV
- Original release: 15 November – 4 December 2009

Series chronology
- ← Previous; Series 8 Next → Series 10

I'm a Celebrity...Get Me Out of Here! returned to ITV1 and ITV2 for a ninth series on 15 November 2009. It broadcast for three weeks and concluded on 4 December 2009. There was however an additional Coming Out episode on 7 December 2009, showing all the celebrities and what they did after they left the jungle.

This was the first and so far only series to feature a contestant from a previous series, Katie Price. She made her second appearance on the show, having first appeared the third series in 2004. Price was paid £400,000, making her the highest-paid I'm a Celebrity contestant, up until she was surpassed by boxer Amir Khan in series 17. It was won by Gino D'Acampo.

== Presenters ==
Ant & Dec returned to present the main show. Emma Willis and Matt Willis stood down from the role as presenters of I'm a Celebrity...Get Me Out of Here! NOW! and were replaced by last year's winner Joe Swash and Caroline Flack for the 2009 series.

== Celebrities ==
The full celebrity line-up was revealed on 11 November 2009.

Celebrity	Known for	Status
Gino D'Acampo	Chef	Winner on 4 December 2009
Kim Woodburn	How Clean Is Your House? presenter	Runner-up on 4 December 2009
Jimmy White	Snooker player	Third place on 4 December 2009
Justin Ryan	Interior designer	Eliminated 7th on 3 December 2009
Stuart Manning	Hollyoaks actor	Eliminated 6th on 2 December 2009
Sabrina Washington	Mis-Teeq singer	Eliminated 5th on 1 December 2009
George Hamilton	Actor	Withdrew on 30 November 2009
Joe Bugner	Boxer	Eliminated 4th on 29 November 2009
Sam Fox	Model	Eliminated 3rd on 27 November 2009
Colin McAllister	Interior designer	Eliminated 2nd on 24 November 2009
Lucy Benjamin	Former EastEnders actress	Eliminated 1st on 23 November 2009
Katie Price	Former glamour model	Withdrew on 22 November 2009
Camilla Dallerup	Professional dancer	Withdrew on 17 November 2009

== Camps ==
The contestants made their way into the jungle in a variety of ways, including sky-diving and hiking. They were situated in the base camp used in previous series.

On Day 5 the camp was split into 2 teams. Each celebrity had to draw a stick and the 2 with a coloured tip were captains and took turns to select their team members. Colin picked Justin, Katie, Sabrina, Jimmy and Joe. Lucy picked Gino, Stuart, George, Sam and Kim.

A trial followed in which they were each positioned under a bucket and using a stick had to balance the contents of the bucket by keeping a button pressed. The winning team was the one that had the final member still standing after all of their opponents had been eliminated. Sabrina was the final contestant to survive, making Colin’s team the winner. They were excluded from the first elimination vote and lived in the relative luxury of base camp.

Base Camp was transformed into a relative jungle paradise. It was furnished with camp chairs, pillows for the beds, dressing gowns, firewood and purified water. Lucy’s team entered the Exile camp. It was a rat infested clearing containing only the bare essentials, with one log to sit on and only one bed, no shower and only rice and beans to eat.

Over the next 3 days, everyone in Exile Camp participated in a Bush Battle with the winner of each one being allowed to return to Base Camp and gain immunity from the first public elimination vote. The battles were won by Stuart, Kim and George.

While the camp was split, all celebrities selected for Bushtucker Trials competed for 12 stars as usual. However, the first meals were allocated to Base Camp, 1 for each member at the time with any remainder providing food to the Exile team, except for Vile Vending in which Kim competed for 5 stars for Exile while Katie competed for 7 for base camp. This would have placed added pressure on any Exile member who completed a 1-person trial, as they would have had to collect all 12 stars to feed their own camp, however Katie competed in both of them, and, despite trying, failed to get all stars in any of her 6 trials.

On Day 8 the two camps reunited, located at 'Base Camp'.

== Results and elimination ==
Indicates that the celebrity was immune from the vote
Indicates that the celebrity received the most votes
Indicates that the celebrity received the fewest votes and was eliminated immediately (no bottom two/three)
Indicates that the celebrity was in the bottom two or three in the public vote

Daily results per celebrity
	Day 10	Day 11	Day 13	Day 14	Day 16	Day 17	Day 18	Day 19	Day 20	Day 21		Trials	Bush battles
	Day 10	Day 11	Day 13	Day 14	Day 16	Day 17	Day 18	Day 19	Day 20	Round 1	Round 2	Trials	Bush battles
Gino	1st 68.13%	1st 47.67%	1st 43.04%	Immune	1st 41.94%	1st 48.00%	Immune	1st 59.37%	1st 62.82%	1st 72.98%	Winner; 83.42%	5	3
Kim	Immune	2nd 10.84%	2nd 13.49%	Immune	2nd 11.77%	3rd 11.63%	Immune	2nd 11.37%	2nd 13.06%	2nd 14.77%	Runner-up; 16.58%	5	2
Jimmy	Immune	5th 6.07%	7th 5.64%	2nd 37.95%	3rd 10.29%	4th 11.41%	Immune	4th 10.71%	3rd 12.08%	3rd 12.24%	Eliminated (Day 21)	4	0
Justin	Immune	7th 3.95%	3rd 8.62%	Immune	5th 9.55%	5th 8.98%	1st 55.20%	3rd 11.28%	4th 12.04%	Eliminated (Day 20)		3	0
Stuart	Immune	6th 5.78%	6th 5.77%	Immune	8th 4.45%	2nd 13.55%	Immune	5th 7.27%	Eliminated (Day 19)			3	1
Sabrina	Immune	8th 3.92%	9th 4.80%	1st 41.24%	4th 9.76%	6th 6.82%	2nd 44.80%	Eliminated (Day 18)				2	0
George	Immune	3rd 9.59%	4th 7.04%	Immune	6th 7.65%	Withdrew (Day 17)						0	3
Joe	Immune	9th 2.55%	5th 6.20%	Immune	7th 5.00%	Eliminated (Day 16)						3	0
Sam	2nd 17.09%	4th 7.28%	8th 5.40%	3rd 20.81%	Eliminated (Day 14)							1	3
Colin	Immune	10th 2.37%	Eliminated (Day 11)									0	0
Lucy	3rd 14.78%	Eliminated (Day 10)										0	3
Katie	Withdrew (Day 9)											6	0
Camilla	Withdrew (Day 4)											0	0
Notes	1	None		2, 3	4	None							
Bottom two/three (named in)	None	Colin, Joe	Jimmy, Sabrina, Sam	None	Joe, Stuart	Justin, Sabrina		Jimmy, Stuart	Jimmy, Justin	None			
Eliminated	Lucy; 14.78% to save	Colin; 2.37% to save	None	Sam; 20.81% to save	Joe; Lost trial	None	Sabrina; 44.80% to save	Stuart; 7.27% to save	Justin; 12.04% to save	Jimmy; 12.24% to win	Kim; 16.58% to win		
Eliminated	Lucy; 14.78% to save	Colin; 2.37% to save	None	Sam; 20.81% to save	Joe; Lost trial	None	Sabrina; 44.80% to save	Stuart; 7.27% to save	Justin; 12.04% to save	Jimmy; 12.24% to win	Gino; 83.42% to win		

On 17 November 2009 (Day 4) Camila Dallerup withdrew because she fell ill. On 22 November 2009 (Day 9), Katie Price withdrew from the competition also because she was fed up of the jungle and doing 6 bushtucker trials in a row. On 30 November 2009 (Day 17), George Hamilton withdrew from the competition because of personal reasons.

=== Notes ===
^1 On Day 10 the bottom two (who were Lucy Benjamin & Sam Fox) were not revealed on air.
^2 On Day 13, all of the celebrities faced the public vote, with the bottom three being revealed as Sam, Sabrina and Jimmy. The other celebrities were declared safe, and the phone lines for the bottom three reopened for another 24 hours.
^3 On Day 14 the bottom two (who were Jimmy White & Sam Fox) were not revealed on air.
^4 On Day 15, all of the celebrities faced the public vote, with the bottom two being revealed as Joe and Stuart. The other celebrities were declared safe and both Joe and Stuart would go to Jungle Jail where they will go head to head with the winner returning to camp and the loser being eliminated from camp. Joe lost the trial to Stuart, therefore he was eliminated.

== Bushtucker Trials ==
The contestants take part in daily trials to earn food

The public voted for who they wanted to face the trial
The contestants decided who did which trial
The trial was compulsory and neither the public nor celebrities decided who took part

Trial number	Air date	Name of trial	Celebrity participation	Public vote	Winner/Number of stars	Notes
1	15 November	All Washed Up	Gino; Sam	—N/a	9/11 stars	^{See Note 1}
2	16 November	Dreaded Descent	Kim	41.07%	11/11 stars	None
3	17 November	Deathly Burrows	Katie	84.29%	4/12 stars	^{See Note 2}
4	18 November	Celebrity in a Bottle	Katie	73.94%	6/12 stars	^{See Note 3}
5 (Live)	19 November	Jungle School	Katie	75.27%	9/12 stars	^{See Note 4}
6	20 November	Hell Holes Extreme	Katie	61.95%	9/12 stars	^{See Note 2}
7	21 November	Vile Vending	Katie; Kim	42.80% 26.99%	3/7 stars 5/5 stars	^{See Note 5}
8	22 November	Car-Lamity!	Katie	50.69%	11/12 stars	None
9	23 November	Bad Pit	Joe; Kim	49.20% 7.57%	9/11 stars	^{See Note 3}^{See Note 6}
10	24 November	Slip and Slide	Gino; Stuart	—N/a	10/10 stars	None
11	25 November	Jungle Arms	Joe; Kim	38.04% 18.20%	10/10 stars	^{See Note 10}
12	27 November	Scareway to Hell	Jimmy	—N/a	5/9 stars	^{See Note 7}
13	28 November	Great Barrier Grief	Justin	—N/a	8/8 stars	None
14	29 November	Jungle Jail	Joe; Stuart	5.00% 4.45%	Stuart	^{See Note 8}
15	30 November	Buzz Off	Sabrina; Stuart	—N/a	3/7 stars	^{See Note 3}
16	1 December	Memory Misery	Jimmy; Sabrina	—N/a	1/6 stars	None
17	2 December	Off Your Trolley	Gino; Justin	—N/a	3/5 stars	None
18	3 December	Hell Hill	Gino; Justin; Jimmy	—N/a	4/4 stars	^{See Note 9}
19	4 December	John Trevolting	Kim	—N/a	5/5 stars	None
20	4 December	Bushtucker Bonanza	Gino	—N/a	5/5 stars	None
21	4 December	Flash Flood	Jimmy	—N/a	4/5 stars	None

=== Notes ===
^1 This trial determined how many beds and dinners would be in camp.
^2 Kim and George were excluded from this trial on medical grounds.
^3 George was excluded from this trial on medical grounds.
^4 This was a live trial.
^5 In a twist the celebrity from each camp who received the most votes faced the trial together.
^6 As Katie left the jungle on Day 9, Kim joined Joe in this trial as she received the third highest number of votes.
^7 Kim, George and Joe were excluded from this trial.
^8 This trial decided who left the jungle (which was Joe) and not how camp were fed that night. It was not revealed if the camp had to earn their meals.
^9 Kim was excluded from this trial on medical grounds, so her star was taken by Gino.
^10Kim and Joe competed in four rounds of both having the same drinks, to win all 8 meals, then completed another with different drinks to win the ninth meal and a chocolate treat. During this final round Kim vomited her "sampuka" on Ant and Dec, and was told it didn't count, but was given another, which she drank. Katie Price was originally voted into this trial (the results were given the day before) but she decided to quit the jungle (withdraw), so Kim Woodburn took her place because she was the person with the 3rd most votes.

== Star count ==
Celebrity	Number of Stars Earned	Percentage
Camilla Dallerup	—N/a	—N/a
Colin McAllister	—N/a	—N/a
George Hamilton	—N/a	—N/a
Gino D'Acampo	31/35 stars	89%
Jimmy White	14/24 stars	58%
Joe Bugner	19/21 stars	90%
Justin Ryan	15/17 stars	88%
Katie Price	42/67 stars	63%
Kim Woodburn	40/42 stars	95%
Lucy Benjamin	—N/a	—N/a
Sabrina Washington	4/13 stars	31%
Sam Fox	9/11 stars	82%
Stuart Manning	13/17 stars	76%

== Bush Battles ==
Battle No.	Broadcast Date	Name of Battle	Theme	Celebrities Taking Part	Winner	Notes
1	20 November 2009	The Tube	Endurance	Gino, Kim, Lucy, George, Sam & Stuart	Stuart	None
2	21 November 2009	Gone Fishing	Patience	Gino, Kim, Lucy, George, & Sam	Kim	^{See Note 1}
3	22 November 2009	Slow Boat	Timing	Gino, Lucy, George, & Sam	George	None

^1 To decide the winner, Lucy and Kim each had to guess (to the nearest hour, minute and second) how long they did the battle for.

== Ratings ==
All ratings are taken from the UK Programme Ratings website, BARB.

Episode	Air date	Official rating (millions)	ITV weekly rank
1	15 November	10.51	3
2	16 November	10.14	7
3	17 November	9.16	12
4	18 November	8.92	15
5	19 November	8.99	14
6	20 November	7.86	21
7	21 November	10.86	4
8	22 November	10.67	6
9	23 November	10.17	5
10	24 November	8.39	16
11	26 November	8.55	15
12	27 November	8.67	13
13	28 November	9.38	9
14	29 November	9.35	10
15	30 November	9.54	6
16	1 December	8.58	16
17	2 December	8.71	13
18	3 December	8.99	12
19	4 December	10.54	3
Series average	2009	9.37	—N/a
Coming Out	7 December	7.53	9

== Controversy ==
Gino D'Acampo and Stuart Manning were initially charged by New South Wales Police after RSPCA Australia complained over their killing and eating of a rat during the show, the killing of animals for performance being illegal. ITV apologised for not having properly advised the contestants of Australian legislation regarding animal cruelty. However, the charges were dropped against D'Acampo and Manning when ITV accepted responsibility for the incident. They were subsequently charged around £1,600.
