= I'm a Celebrity...The Wild Frontier =

British reality television series

- Genre: Reality television
- Presented by: Ant & Dec
- Theme music composer: Grant Buckerfield
- Country of origin: United Kingdom
- Original language: English

Production
- Production locations: Callaghan Valley, Canada; London (live final)
- Camera setup: Multi-camera
- Running time: 60 minutes
- Production company: Lifted Entertainment

Original release
- Network: ITV
- Release: 2027

Related
- I'm a Celebrity...Get Me Out of Here! I'm a Celebrity: Unpacked; I'm a Celebrity... South Africa

I'm a Celebrity...The Wild Frontier is an upcoming ITV reality television series, a spin-off of I'm a Celebrity...Get Me Out of Here! featuring pairs of first-time contestants. It was filmed in Callaghan Valley, Canada between September and October 2026. The series will be presented by Ant & Dec and is expected to launch in Spring 2027.

== Development ==
In May 2026, media outlets began to report that ITV were planning a new spin-off series to mark the show's 25th anniversary. The Wild Frontier is expected to feature pairs of first-time contestants, such as celebrity duos or a famous name paired with a personal friend or family member, competing in trails and challenges as well as living together in the Canadian wilderness. Filming took place between September and October 2026 within the Callaghan Valley which was home to the Whistler Olympic Park. Minaty Bay was later revealed as a filming location for a number of challenges and trials, with a campsite set up near Conflict Lake.

During a promo video for the series, Ant and Dec confirmed that the final would be broadcast live from London, with the public choosing the winning pair. As with previous versions, ITV2 companion show Unpacked will accompany the series. The scheduling pattern is expected to differ from the usual nightly format; instead, episodes will be aired three times a week over the course of five weeks.
