= I'm a Celebrity...Get Me Out of Here! (British TV series) series 6 =

I'm a Celebrity...Get Me Out of Here!
- Series 6
- Presented by: Anthony McPartlin; Declan Donnelly
- No. of days: 19
- No. of castaways: 12
- Winner: Matt Willis
- Runner-up: Myleene Klass
- Companion shows: I'm a Celebrity...Get Me Out of Here! NOW! I'm a Celebrity...Get Me Out of Here! Exclusive
- No. of episodes: 17

Release
- Original network: ITV
- Original release: 13 November – 1 December 2006

Series chronology
- ← Previous; Series 5 Next → Series 7

I'm a Celebrity... Get Me out of Here! returned to ITV for a sixth series on Monday 13 November 2006 and ran until Friday 1 December 2006. Once again the series was hosted by Ant and Dec.

Kelly Osbourne and Brendon Burns initially presented the ITV2 spin-off show I'm a Celebrity... Get Me Out of Here! with Burns broadcasting from London, and Osbourne from Australia. However Burns was later replaced by Mark Durden Smith, and Osbourne was joined by Steve Wilson, and later Jeff Brazier.

The I'm a Celebrity...Exclusive teatime programme ran on weekdays on ITV1. It was hosted by Series 5 contestant Sheree Murphy and Phillip Schofield. The series was won by Matt Willis on Day 19.

Iceland, the supermarket, replaced First Choice Holidays as the shows' sponsor.

Dean Gaffney and Myleene Klass would return to the series sixteen years later to participate in I'm a Celebrity... South Africa alongside other former contestants to try to become the first I'm a Celebrity legend. Gaffney was eliminated alongside series 12 contestant Helen Flanagan, with the pair finishing joint seventh and eighth overall. Klass went on to win, becoming the first ever I'm a Celebrity legend.

== Celebrities ==
Twelve celebrity contestants participated in the sixth series.

Celebrity	Famous for	Status
Matt Willis	Former Busted singer	Winner on 1 December 2006
Myleene Klass	Hear'Say singer & model	Runner-up on 1 December 2006
Jason Donovan	Actor & singer	Third place on 1 December 2006
David Gest	Music promoter	Eliminated 9th on 30 November 2006
Dean Gaffney	Former EastEnders actor	Eliminated 8th on 30 November 2006
Jan Leeming	Newsreader	Eliminated 7th on 29 November 2006
Malandra Burrows	Former Emmerdale actress	Eliminated 6th on 28 November 2006
Phina Oruche	Footballer's Wives actress	Eliminated 5th on 27 November 2006
Lauren Booth	Broadcaster, journalist, & human rights activist	Eliminated 4th on 26 November 2006
Faith Brown	Comedian & impressionist	Eliminated 3rd on 25 November 2006
Scott Henshall	Fashion designer	Eliminated 2nd on 24 November 2006
Toby Anstis	Global Radio presenter	Eliminated 1st on 23 November 2006

== Camps ==
On Day 8, the camp was split in two for the first time in I'm A Celebrity history and took part in a 'Battle of The Sexes' like competition. Team Base Camp consisted of David, Dean, Jason, Matt, Scott and Toby. Team Snake Rock consisted of Faith, Jan, Lauren, Malandra, Myleene and Phina.

The two teams competed in Bushtucker Trials for food, and in Celebrity Chests for treats and other luxury items. The final head to head trial was to win immunity from the first elimination. The girls won, meaning the men faced the public vote. Toby was eventually evicted.

The first competitive Celebrity Chest, contested between Matt and Scott of Team Base Camp and Lauren and Phina of Team Snake Rock ended in controversy when Scott and Phina fought over the chest, resulting in Phina biting Scott.

== Results and elimination ==
Indicates that the celebrity was immune from the public vote
Indicates that the celebrity received the most votes from the public
Indicates that the celebrity received the fewest public votes and was immediately eliminated (no bottom two/three)
Indicates that the celebrity was in the bottom two or three in the public vote

Daily results per celebrity
Celebrity	Day 11	Day 12	Day 13	Day 14	Day 15	Day 16	Day 17	Day 18		Day 19		Trials
Celebrity	Day 11	Day 12	Day 13	Day 14	Day 15	Day 16	Day 17	Round 1	Round 2	Round 1	Round 2	Trials
Matt	Safe	Safe	Safe	Safe	Safe	Safe	Bottom two	Safe	Safe	Safe	Winner (Day 19)	4
Myleene	Immune	Safe	Safe	Safe	Safe	Safe	Safe	Safe	Safe	Safe	Runner-up (Day 19)	4
Jason	Safe	Safe	Safe	Safe	Safe	Safe	Safe	Safe	Safe	3rd	Eliminated (Day 19)	5
David	Safe	Safe	Safe	Safe	Safe	Safe	Safe	Safe	4th	Eliminated (Day 18)		2
Dean	Bottom two	Safe	Safe	Safe	Safe	Bottom two	Safe	5th	Eliminated (Day 18)			3
Jan	Immune	Safe	Safe	Safe	Bottom two	Safe	6th	Eliminated (Day 17)				6
Malandra	Immune	Safe	Bottom two	Bottom two	Safe	7th	Eliminated (Day 16)					2
Phina	Immune	Safe	Safe	Safe	8th	Eliminated (Day 15)						3
Lauren	Immune	Bottom two	Safe	9th	Eliminated (Day 14)							1
Faith	Immune	Safe	10th	Eliminated (Day 13)								0
Scott	Safe	11th	Eliminated (Day 12)									5
Toby	6th	Eliminated (Day 11)										0
Bottom two (named in)	Dean, Toby	Lauren, Scott	Faith, Malandra	Lauren, Malandra	Jan, Phina	Dean, Malandra	Jan, Matt	None				
Eliminated	Toby; Fewest votes to save	Scott; Fewest votes to save	Faith; Fewest votes to save	Lauren; Fewest votes to save	Phina; Fewest votes to save	Malandra; Fewest votes to save	Jan; Fewest votes to save	Dean; Fewest votes to save	David; Fewest votes to save	Jason; Fewest votes to win	Myleene; Fewest votes to win	
Eliminated	Toby; Fewest votes to save	Scott; Fewest votes to save	Faith; Fewest votes to save	Lauren; Fewest votes to save	Phina; Fewest votes to save	Malandra; Fewest votes to save	Jan; Fewest votes to save	Dean; Fewest votes to save	David; Fewest votes to save	Jason; Fewest votes to win	Matt; Most votes to win	

=== Notes ===
^1 On Day 18, there was a double elimination. First the hosts revealed that Dean had the fewest votes and he was eliminated. The phone lines were reopened for the other contestants, and later the hosts returned to camp to reveal that David now the fewest votes, and he was also sent home.

== Bushtucker Trials ==
The contestants take part in daily trials to earn food. The participants are chosen by the public, up until the first eviction, when the campers decide who will take part in the trial

The public voted for who they wanted to face the trial
The contestants decided who did which trial
The trial was compulsory and neither the public or celebrities decided who took part

Trial number	Air date	Name of trial	Celebrity participation	Winner/Number of stars	Notes
1	13 November	Mineshaft Misery	Jan	2/10 stars	None
2	14 November	Flash Flood	David	6/10 stars	None
3	15 November	Jungle Boogie	Scott	1/10 stars	^{1}
4	16 November	Treetop Terror	Jan; Scott	4/10 stars	None
5 (Live)	17 November	Jungle Spa	Dean	9/11 stars	^{2}
6	18 November	Operation	Phina	6/12 stars	^{3}
6	18 November	Operation	Jason	6/12 stars	^{3}
7	19 November	Snake Bite	Jan	10/12 stars	^{4}
8	20 November	Bull in a China Shop	Jan	6/12 stars	None
9	21 November	Catch A Falling Star	Jan; Scott	Jan	^{5}
10	22 November	Bushtucker Duel	Jan; Scott	Scott	None
11	23 November	What Lurks Beneath	Phina; Scott	Phina	^{6}
12	24 November	Thunderball	Jason; Malandra; Matt	3/11 stars	None
13	25 November	Jungle Falls	Dean; Lauren; Phina	6/10 stars	None
14	26 November	Tomb of Torment	Myleene	9/9 stars	None
15	27 November	Shooting Gallery	David; Jason; Matt	1/8 stars	None
16	28 November	Skyscrape	Malandra; Myleene	5/7 stars	None
17	29 November	Temple of Doom	Dean	5/6 stars	None
18	30 November	Celebrity Cyclone	Jason; Myleene; Matt	5/5 stars	^{7}
19	1 December	Bushtucker Bonanza	Matt	5/5 stars	None
20	1 December	Fill Your Face	Jason	5/5 stars	None
21	1 December	Scareoke	Myleene	5/5 stars	None

=== Notes ===
^1 For the trial, Scott had to dance to 10 songs whilst bugs were dropped on his head. Scott danced to one song before shouting "I'm A Celebrity...Get Me out of Here!". This is often touted as the worst ever performance in a Bush Tucker Trial.

^2 The public were asked to choose between two new campers, Dean and Malandra. Whoever the public voted for would take part in the trial and enter the camp.

^3 The public voted for Phina to take part in the trial. She was allowed to choose the second person to take part. She chose Jason.

^4 Upset at the prospect of taking part in the Trial, Jan was allowed to take one campmate to the trial for support. She chose Jason. ^5 This was the first head to head trial.

^6 The winner of the trial won immunity from the first vote off for their camp. Snake Rock won, meaning the male campers faced the public vote.

^7 David did not attend the trial, so his stars were taken by Myleene & Matt.The

== Star count ==
Celebrity	Number of Stars Earned	Percentage
David Gest	7/18 stars	39%
Dean Gaffney	20/27 stars	74%
Faith Brown	—N/a	—N/a
Jan Leeming	22/44 stars	50%
Jason Donovan	20/41 stars	49%
Lauren Booth	6/10 stars	60%
Malandra Burrows	8/18 stars	44%
Matt Willis	14/29 stars	48%
Myleene Klass	24/26 stars	92%
Phina Oruche	12/22 stars	55%
Scott Henshall	5/20 stars	25%
Toby Anstis	—N/a	—N/a

== Ratings ==
All ratings are taken from the UK Programme Ratings website, BARB.

Episode	Air date	Official rating (millions)	Weekly rank for all UK TV channels
1	13 November	9.34	9
2	14 November	7.92	20
3	15 November	7.99	19
4	16 November	7.56	24
5	16 November	7.35	27
6	17 November	6.97	32
7	18 November	7.31	28
8	19 November	8.04	18
9	20 November	9.22	9
10	21 November	7.43	26
11	22 November	8.56	14
12	23 November	8.02	20
13	23 November	6.94	29
14	24 November	7.86	21
15	25 November	7.65	24
16	26 November	7.95	22
17	27 November	8.92	13
18	28 November	7.79	24
19	29 November	7.84	23
20	30 November	7.99	20
21	30 November	7.62	25
22	1 December	10.05	8
Series average	2006	8.01	—N/a
Coming Out	3 December	6.67	22
