= Coed y Gopa =

Protected area in Clwyd, Wales

- Site of Special Scientific Interest
- Location within Wales
- Location of Coed y Gopa.
- Area of search: Clwyd
- Grid reference: SH9355576798
- Coordinates: 53.277441°N 3.5978421°W
- Interest: Biological
- Area: 36.77 ha (90.9 acres)
- Notification date: 21 February 1995

Coed y Gopa is a Site of Special Scientific Interest in the preserved county of Clwyd, north Wales.

Located on a prominent limestone hillside in the Vale of Clwyd in North Wales, Coed y Gopa is a popular wood managed by the Woodland Trust, with a wide variety of wildlife, coastal views, and features of historical interest.

Mine adits and natural caves provide roosts for bats and the second largest lesser horseshoe bat hibernaculum in North East Wales is present at the site, hence the designation as a Site of Special Scientific Interest (SSSI). The site is also home to ospreys and goshawks.

The hill fort of Castell Cawr is located within the SSSI.

== See also ==
- List of Sites of Special Scientific Interest in Clwyd
