= Kemi Rodgers =

English radio and television presenter (born 1994)

- Born: 27 December 1994 (age 31); Eastbourne, East Sussex, England
- Occupations: Radio and television presenter
- Years active: 2019–present
- Employers: Capital; ITV
- Television: I'm a Celebrity: Unpacked

Kemi Rodgers (born 27 December 1994) is an English radio and television presenter. She is known for presenting various shows on Capital (2019–present) and co-presenting I'm a Celebrity: Unpacked (2024–present).

== Life and career ==
Kemi Stephanie Rodgers was born on 27 December 1994 in Eastbourne, East Sussex.

Rodgers worked as a video editor for Reachplc before joining the radio station Capital in 2019. Throughout her tenure, she has presented on Capital Xtra and Capital Dance and also served as a stand-in presenter on Capital Breakfast when Siân Welby was on maternity leave. In August 2024, Rodgers was announced as the new presenter of the Capital mid morning show, hosting between 10am and 1pm on weekdays, and from 9am to 12pm on Saturdays.

Rodgers's television appearances include Big Brother: Late & Live and Morning Live. On the latter, she discussed her experience of being the victim of a mobile phone scam. In October 2024, Rodgers was announced to be co-presenting I'm a Celebrity: Unpacked, the new spin-off of I'm a Celebrity...Get Me Out of Here!, alongside Joel Dommett and Sam Thompson.

== Filmography ==
As herself
Year	Title	Role	Ref.
2023	Morning Live	Guest	
2024	Celebrity Big Brother: Late & Live	Guest	
2024–present	I'm a Celebrity: Unpacked	Presenter	
2025	Big Brother: Late & Live	Guest; 2 episodes	
2026	I’m a celebrity…Unpacked	Presenter	
