= I'm a Celebrity: Unpacked =

British television series

- Also known as: I'm a Celebrity...Get Me Out of Here! Now!; I'm a Celebrity: Extra Camp; I'm a Celebrity...The Daily Drop
- Created by: London Weekend Television (now part of ITV Studios)
- Presented by: Kemi Rodgers; Sam Thompson (Former: See full list)
- Country of origin: United Kingdom
- Original language: English
- No. of series: 22 (Note: Fifteen series previously broadcast as I'm a Celebrity...Get Me Out of Here! Now!; four entitled as Extra Camp and one as The Daily Drop)

Production
- Executive producers: Richard Cowles; Chris Brogden; Becca Walker
- Production locations: Australia (2002–2019, 2024–); London (2020); Versa Studios, London and South Africa (South Africa, 2026)
- Running time: 30–60 minutes (inc. adverts)

Original release
- Network: ITV2
- Release: 27 August 2002 – 8 December 2019
- Release: 15 November – 5 December 2020
- Release: 17 November 2024 – present

Related
- I'm a Celebrity...Get Me Out of Here!; Jungle Drums (2005); I'm a Celebrity...Get Me Out of Here! Exclusive (2006); I'm a Celebrity... South Africa (2026); I'm a Celebrity...The Wild Frontier (2027)

I'm a Celebrity: Unpacked (known originally as I'm a Celebrity...Get Me Out of Here! Now! until 2015 and later I'm a Celebrity: Extra Camp from 2016 until 2019) is the companion series to I'm a Celebrity...Get Me Out of Here!, that was originally broadcast live on ITV2 from August 2002 to December 2019, and returned in November 2024. It features behind-the-scenes footage and interviews with contestants after they have been voted off by the public.

In 2020, Extra Camp was replaced by online spin-off show I'm a Celebrity...The Daily Drop presented by Vick Hope, which also aired on ITV2 after being uploaded online every weekday morning on ITV Hub but was axed in 2021. In October 2024, it was reported that a new companion show would accompany the upcoming twenty-fourth series of I'm a Celebrity; it is currently presented by Sam Thompson and Kemi Rodgers.

== History ==
In the first series, the show was presented by Irish TV presenter Louise Loughman and was broadcast live from the jungle in Australia. From series two to four, the show was presented by Mark Durden-Smith and series one runner-up Tara Palmer-Tomkinson. For the fifth series in 2005, Durden-Smith did not return to present the show, as he decided to spend time with his children instead. He was replaced by Matt Brown. An additional companion show was aired on ITV2; presented by Andy Goldstein, Jungle Drums was similar in format to Big Brother's Big Mouth and was broadcast each weekday in an early evening slot. Palmer-Tomkinson left after this year to pursue new projects. Brown did not return for series 6.

In series 6, Australian stand-up comedian Brendon Burns initially presented the show from the UK, but left after three episodes. Burns, who received mixed reviews for his presenting style, could not come to an agreement with producers on how the programme should be presented, with ITV bosses reportedly wanting someone who knew the reality show’s format and style better than Burns. This led to Durden-Smith returning for the rest of the series, where he presented from the UK. He was joined by new presenters Kelly Osbourne and Jeff Brazier (briefly Steve Wilson before Brazier took over), who presented from the jungle in Australia. In later interviews, Burns discussed his time on the show saying he disliked his fellow co-presenters and denied that he'd been fired by ITV. Also this series, a 5pm teatime programme, I'm a Celebrity...Get Me Out of Here! Exclusive, ran each weekday on the main ITV channel. It was co-hosted by series five runner-up Sheree Murphy and Phillip Schofield in 2006. It did not return for a second series.

For series 7–8, series six winner Matt Willis and his wife Emma took over from the previous hosts, Kelly Osbourne and Jeff Brazier, in Australia. Because they were having a child in early 2009, they did not return to present series nine later that year. Durden-Smith also presented segments of the show, from the UK, for the final time. From the ninth to nineteenth series, the programme had been filmed completely live in Australia with occasional celebrity interviews based in London, shown through webcam.

Series 9 to 10 saw new presenter Caroline Flack take over with series eight winner Joe Swash as roving reporter, resident comedian Russell Kane, and a panel of celebrity pundits, which changed approximately every three to five days. For series 11, Flack left in order to present another ITV2 show, The Xtra Factor, and was replaced by Laura Whitmore. Swash and Kane both stayed on for the eleventh series.

For series 12, Kane was replaced by stand-up comic Rob Beckett. All three presenters returned to present the thirteenth and fourteenth series of the show.

Due to tour commitments, Beckett did not return for the fifteenth series. He was replaced by comedian David Morgan.

Extra Camp title card in 2017

On 14 April 2016, Laura Whitmore stated that she would not be returning to the Jungle. On 31 May 2016 during an interview on Up Late with Rylan, Morgan confirmed that he would not be returning to the series due to other work commitments. They were replaced by two former winners Vicky Pattison, Stacey Solomon and comedian Chris Ramsey. The show was also renamed I'm a Celebrity: Extra Camp.

On 13 April 2017, Pattison and Ramsey both stated on social media that they would not be returning to the show later that year. The winner of the sixteenth series Scarlett Moffatt was announced as a new presenter in September 2017 and would join long-running presenter Swash on the new series. It was also confirmed that Joel Dommett, who was runner-up to Moffatt, would also be joining and thus, for the first time, the presenting lineup consisted of all former campmates. On 20 July 2019, it was confirmed that both Swash and Moffatt had left the show and would not return for the series that year. It was confirmed on 9 October that former finalists Emily Atack and Adam Thomas would join Dommett for the 2019 series.

== Cancellation and replacements ==
On 9 January 2020, it was announced that series had been axed due to high production costs and would not return later that year. The series was replaced by online spin-off show I'm a Celebrity...The Daily Drop hosted by Vick Hope. Episodes were uploaded each weekday morning on ITV Hub and broadcast later in the afternoon on ITV2. As a result of the COVID-19 pandemic and due to flexibility and cost savings, The Daily Drop was filmed "as live" on a virtual turret-style set in London using virtual technology and augmented reality. In October 2021, it was announced that the online spin-off show I'm a Celebrity...The Daily Drop had been axed, with no plans for a replacement. In 2023, the first all-star series of the South Africa spin-off was accompanied by an official podcast, this was hosted by series 16 winner and former Extra Camp host Scarlett Moffatt and series 22 campmate Seann Walsh.

In October 2024, it was reported that a new ITV2 companion show would accompany the upcoming series next month; later that month Dommett and Sam Thompson were reported to be the hosts. On 29 October, the show's return was confirmed by ITV with Capital UK radio DJ Kemi Rodgers joining the line-up of presenters for the newly retitled show. The first series of Unpacked was repeated on ITV1 in a weekday afternoon slot. On 30 October 2025, ITV confirmed that Unpacked would return for a second series with Dommett and Rogers continuing as hosts. In March 2026, it was revealed that Unpacked would accompany the second all-star series as a video podcast with a live episode broadcast for the series final. Thompson returned and was this time based in a UK recording studio with celebrity guests and former campmates, while Rodgers interviewed Ant & Dec on location in South Africa. On 23 July 2026, it was confirmed that Unpacked would return for a third series, which Thompson and Rodgers would return to present, but Dommett wouldn't return. The same format will be used to accompany The Wild Frontier, a new spin-off series filmed in Canada that is set to premiere in 2027. The presenters of this have yet to be confirmed.

== Presenters ==
Various TV presenters and comedians have hosted the show since it began in 2002, with Joe Swash having presented the most series, at 10.

Title	Series	Presenter(s)				
Title	Series	1	2	3	4	Comedian
Get Me Out of Here! Now!	1	Louise Loughman	—N/a	—N/a	—N/a	—N/a
Get Me Out of Here! Now!	2	Tara Palmer-Tomkinson	Mark Durden-Smith	—N/a	—N/a	—N/a
Get Me Out of Here! Now!	3	Tara Palmer-Tomkinson	Mark Durden-Smith	—N/a	—N/a	—N/a
Get Me Out of Here! Now!	4	Tara Palmer-Tomkinson	Mark Durden-Smith	—N/a	—N/a	—N/a
Get Me Out of Here! Now!	5	Tara Palmer-Tomkinson	Matt Brown	—N/a	—N/a	—N/a
Get Me Out of Here! Now!	6	Kelly Osbourne	Steve Wilson	Mark Durden-Smith (Note: Burns and Durden-Smith presented studio segments from the UK.)	Jeff Brazier	Brendon Burns
Get Me Out of Here! Now!	7	Emma Willis	Matt Willis	Mark Durden-Smith	—N/a	—N/a
Get Me Out of Here! Now!	8	Emma Willis	Matt Willis	Mark Durden-Smith	—N/a	—N/a
Get Me Out of Here! Now!	9	Caroline Flack	Joe Swash	—N/a	—N/a	Russell Kane
Get Me Out of Here! Now!	10	Caroline Flack	Joe Swash	—N/a	—N/a	Russell Kane
Get Me Out of Here! Now!	11	Laura Whitmore	Joe Swash	—N/a	—N/a	Russell Kane
Get Me Out of Here! Now!	12	Laura Whitmore	Joe Swash	—N/a	—N/a	Rob Beckett
Get Me Out of Here! Now!	13	Laura Whitmore	Joe Swash	—N/a	—N/a	Rob Beckett
Get Me Out of Here! Now!	14	Laura Whitmore	Joe Swash	—N/a	—N/a	Rob Beckett
Get Me Out of Here! Now!	15	Laura Whitmore	Joe Swash	—N/a	—N/a	David Morgan
Extra Camp	16	Vicky Pattison	Joe Swash	Stacey Solomon	—N/a	Chris Ramsey
Extra Camp	17	Scarlett Moffatt	Joe Swash	—N/a	—N/a	Joel Dommett
Extra Camp	18	Scarlett Moffatt	Joe Swash	—N/a	—N/a	Joel Dommett
Extra Camp	19	Emily Atack	Adam Thomas	—N/a	—N/a	Joel Dommett
The Daily Drop	20	Vick Hope (Note: Hope presented The Daily Drop on a virtual set in London)	—N/a	—N/a	—N/a	—N/a
Unpacked	24	Joel Dommett	Kemi Rodgers (Note: For the second all-star series, Thompson presented the series with Rodgers presenting interview segments from South Africa.)	Sam Thompson	—N/a	—N/a
Unpacked	25	Joel Dommett	Kemi Rodgers	—N/a	—N/a	—N/a
Unpacked	2 (SA)	Sam Thompson	Kemi Rodgers	—N/a	—N/a	—N/a
Unpacked	26	Sam Thompson	Kemi Rodgers	—N/a	—N/a	—N/a
Unpacked	1 (WF)	TBA				
