= Lynne Franks =

British communications strategist and writer (born 1948)

Lynne Franks OBE
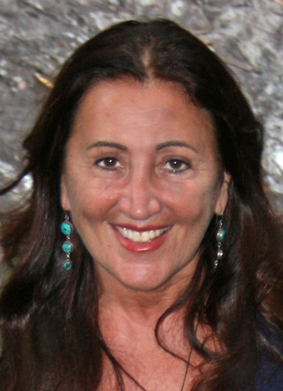
- Franks in 2007
- Born: 16 April 1948 (age 78); London, England
- Known for: Founded Lynne Franks PR, Campaigner for women's issues
- Relatives: Josh Howie (son), Jessica Howie (daughter)

Lynne Joanne Franks (born 16 April 1948) is a British communications strategist and writer. She founded her public relations firm in 1970 and worked with many British fashion brands, later also championing various women's leadership initiatives. Franks is considered to be the instigator of London Fashion Week, and rumoured to be the inspiration for the character of Edina in British sitcom Absolutely Fabulous.

== Early life ==
Franks was born and raised in North London in 1948. The daughter of a Jewish butcher, Franks attended Minchenden Grammar School in Southgate, leaving at the age of 16. She completed a shorthand typing course at Pitman's College and was a regular dancer on the popular music TV programme Ready Steady Go!

== Career ==
Franks initially worked in various secretarial jobs before taking a journalistic role at Petticoat, working under Eve Pollard and alongside Janet Street-Porter. Following a brief period as a PR assistant and at the encouragement of the fashion designer Katharine Hamnett, Franks started her own PR agency at the age of 21.

=== PR firm ===
Franks started Lynne Franks PR in 1970 at the age of 21. Her first clients included Hamnett's fashion business, Tuttabankem, and Wendy Dagworthy. Working initially from her home, the new agency moved to the Covent Garden area of London. The agency subsequently worked with high street brands including Harvey Nichols and Tommy Hilfiger, and represented individuals such as Jean-Paul Gaultier, Annie Lennox, Lenny Henry and Ruby Wax. Franks PR also worked briefly with the Labour Party in 1986. In October 1993, she stepped down as chairperson to concentrate on broadcasting. The firm was later renamed Life PR.

=== London Fashion Week ===
In 1984, Franks persuaded the Murjani Corporation (owners of Gloria Vanderbilt jeans) to sponsor a large tent outside the Commonwealth Institute in Kensington so that numerous designers could exhibit in one place, in what is largely considered to be the first London Fashion Week.

=== Viva and GlobalFusion ===
In July 1995, Franks chaired a consortium that launched Viva! 963, Britain's first radio station for women, with Franks herself hosting a twice-weekly interview show entitled Frankly Speaking. Following the publication of her autobiography in 1997, Franks moved to California, and formed GlobalFusion, a cause-related marketing agency, working to promote environmentally-friendly fashion and cosmetic brands and helping to launch The Big Issue in Los Angeles.

=== SEED ===
While in California, Franks developed the idea of Sustainable Enterprise and Empowerment Dynamics (SEED).

In collaboration with Tribal Education, Franks developed the SEED Women into Enterprise Programme, a blended learning course for self-employment. Aimed particularly at women from disadvantaged communities around the UK, the programme has been delivered through local government agencies, training companies and charities. In 2009, she launched the SEED Community Site, a social networking website to connect women entrepreneurs around the world.

She was a member of the advisory board for McDonald's in the UK, helping to initiate their Women's Leadership Development Programme and worked with Regus to create and develop the B.Hive network of women's business clubs.

=== V-Day campaign ===
Franks was the chair of V-Day UK, a charity created by Eve Ensler, which campaigns to end violence against women and girls. In March 2009, Franks organised a Women of Influence Lunch at the House of Lords, to draw attention to the campaign.

The following November, Franks organised the Great Congo Demonstration at the Royal Albert Hall calling for an end to the systemic sexual violence against women in the region.

== Books ==
In 1997, Franks published her autobiography, Absolutely Now!: A Futurist's Journey to Her Inner Truth, describing Franks' emotional and spiritual journey since leaving the world of PR, including her spiritual experiences at locations such as the Findhorn Foundation in Scotland and the Esalen Institute in California and her ideas on feminism, environmental issues and ethical business practices.

In 2000, Franks published the principles for SEED (Sustainable Enterprise and Empowerment Dynamics) in The SEED Handbook: The Feminine Way to Create Business. Franks later published Grow: The Modern Woman's Handbook and Bloom: A Woman's Journal for Inspired Living.

== Popular culture ==
The claim that the character Edina Monsoon in the British sitcom Absolutely Fabulous, created by Jennifer Saunders, a former client and friend of Franks, was intended to be a satirised version of Franks during this period was initially denied by both Franks and Saunders. However, in March 2025, Franks asserted on her own website that her lifestyle was the inspiration for the Edina character, adding that she also represented the character's favourite store, Harvey Nichols.

== Personal life ==
Franks met her husband, Paul Howie, an Australian fashion buyer and designer, while writing and editing the Freemans clothing stores in-house publications.
