= I'm a Celebrity... South Africa series 1 =

I'm a Celebrity... South Africa
- Series 1
- Presented by: Anthony McPartlin; Declan Donnelly
- No. of days: 15
- No. of castaways: 15
- Winner: Myleene Klass
- Runner-up: Jordan Banjo
- Location: Blyde River Canyon, South Africa
- Companion show: I'm a Celebrity... South Africa - The Podcast
- No. of episodes: 15 (+ 1 special)

Release
- Original network: ITV
- Original release: 24 April – 12 May 2023

Additional information
- Filming dates: September 2022 – October 2022

Series chronology
- Next → Series 2

The first series of I'm a Celebrity...South Africa began airing on ITV on 24 April 2023. Ant & Dec presented the series, which was pre-recorded between September and October 2022.

On 12 May 2023, series 6 runner-up Myleene Klass was crowned winner of the series after defeating series 16 campmate Jordan Banjo in the final survival trial, who ultimately finished as runner-up. A few days later, Klass revealed that she'd donated her £100,000 winning fee to the charity Save the Children in which she has served as an ambassador for over a decade.

== Production ==
In April 2022, several news outlets reported that ITV had commissioned an "All-Stars" spin-off series of the show to be pre-recorded in South Africa, featuring former campmates that had competed in the series. ITV later confirmed the reports in September 2022, with filming beginning the same month and was completed prior to the beginning of the twenty-second regular series. The spin-off series was accompanied by an official podcast, this was hosted by series 16 winner Scarlett Moffatt and series 22 campmate Seann Walsh.

== Celebrities ==
The original line-up was announced on 25 March 2023. Gillian McKeith entered the camp on the evening of Day 1. Andy Whyment, Georgia "Toff" Toffolo and Myleene Klass entered on Day 3. Dean Gaffney and Joe Swash entered on Day 7.

On 15 April, over a week prior to the show's launch, it was announced that Janice Dickinson had suffered a head injury while filming the pre-recorded series, and had to be taken to hospital. She was later forced to withdraw from the show due to her injuries in scenes that aired on 8 May. In September 2025, it was reported that she had sued ITV over the fall and injuries sustained.

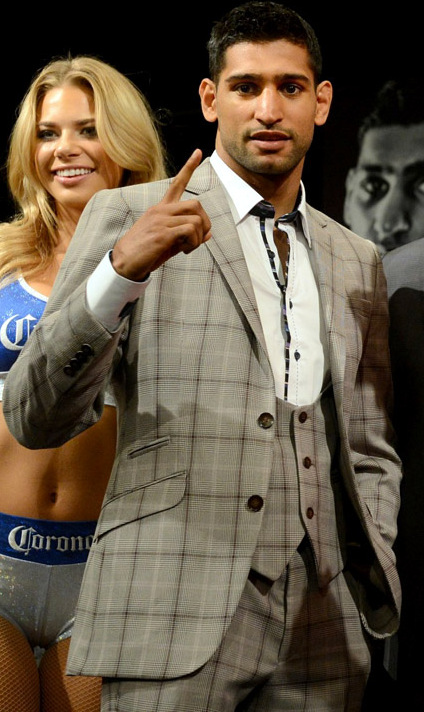
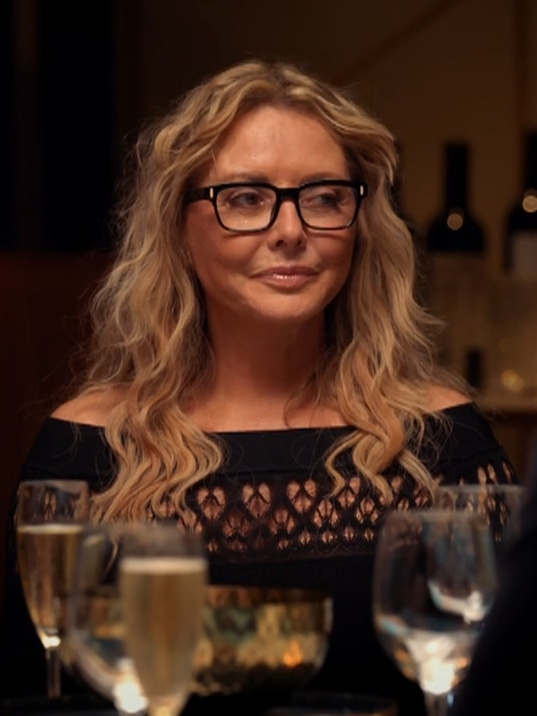
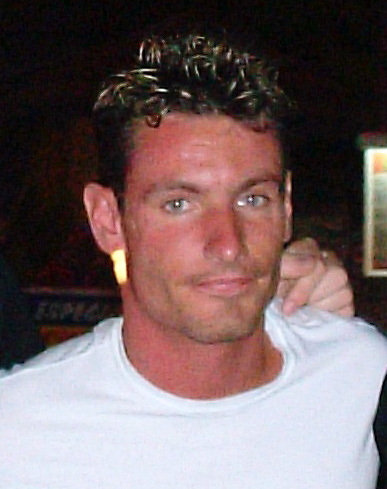
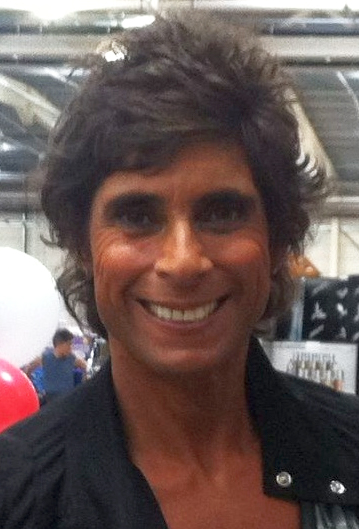
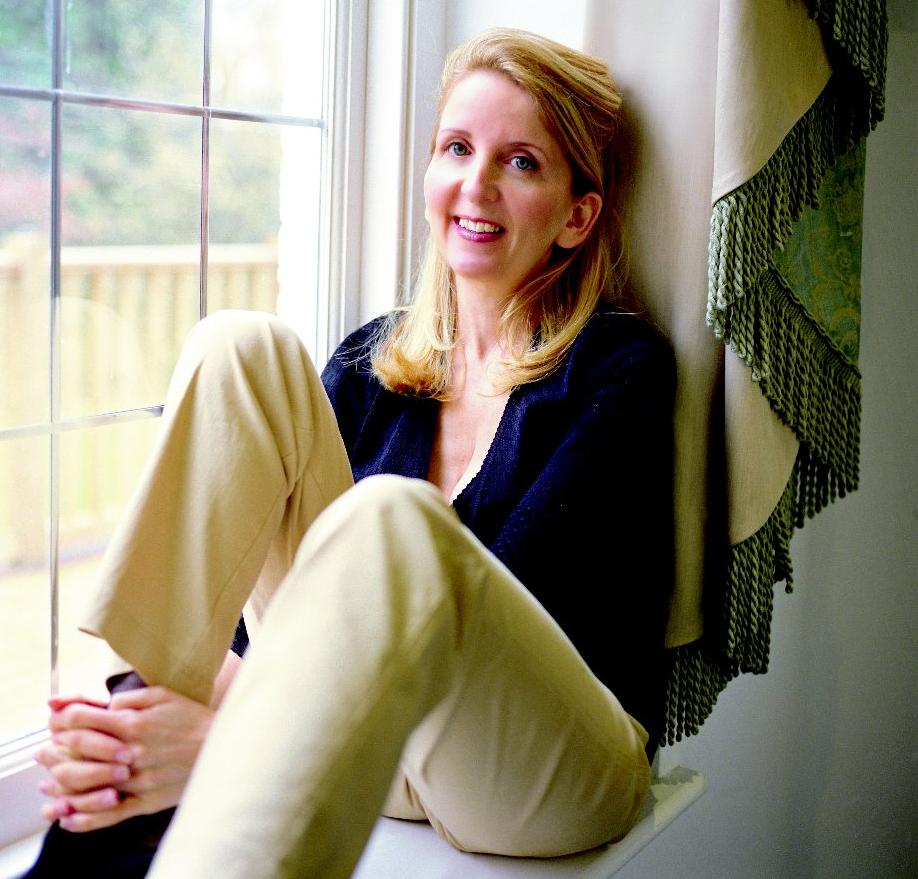
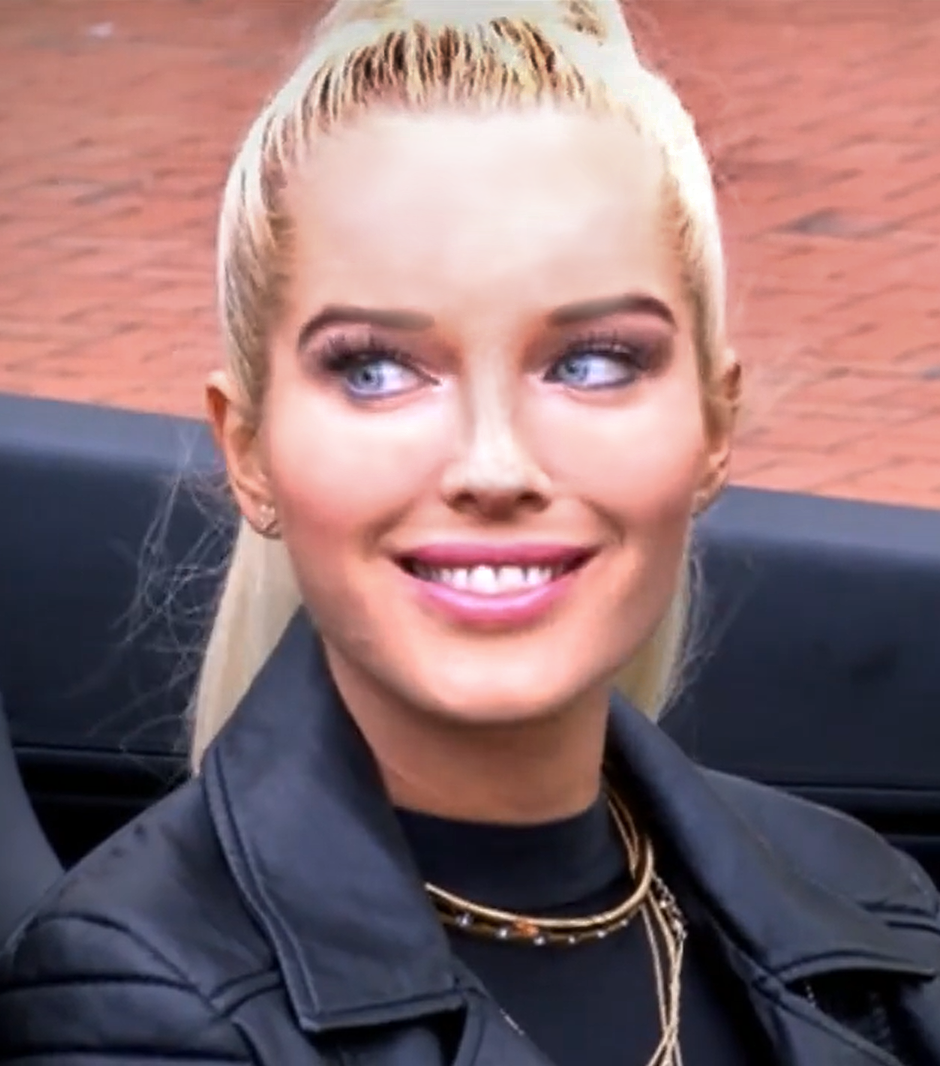
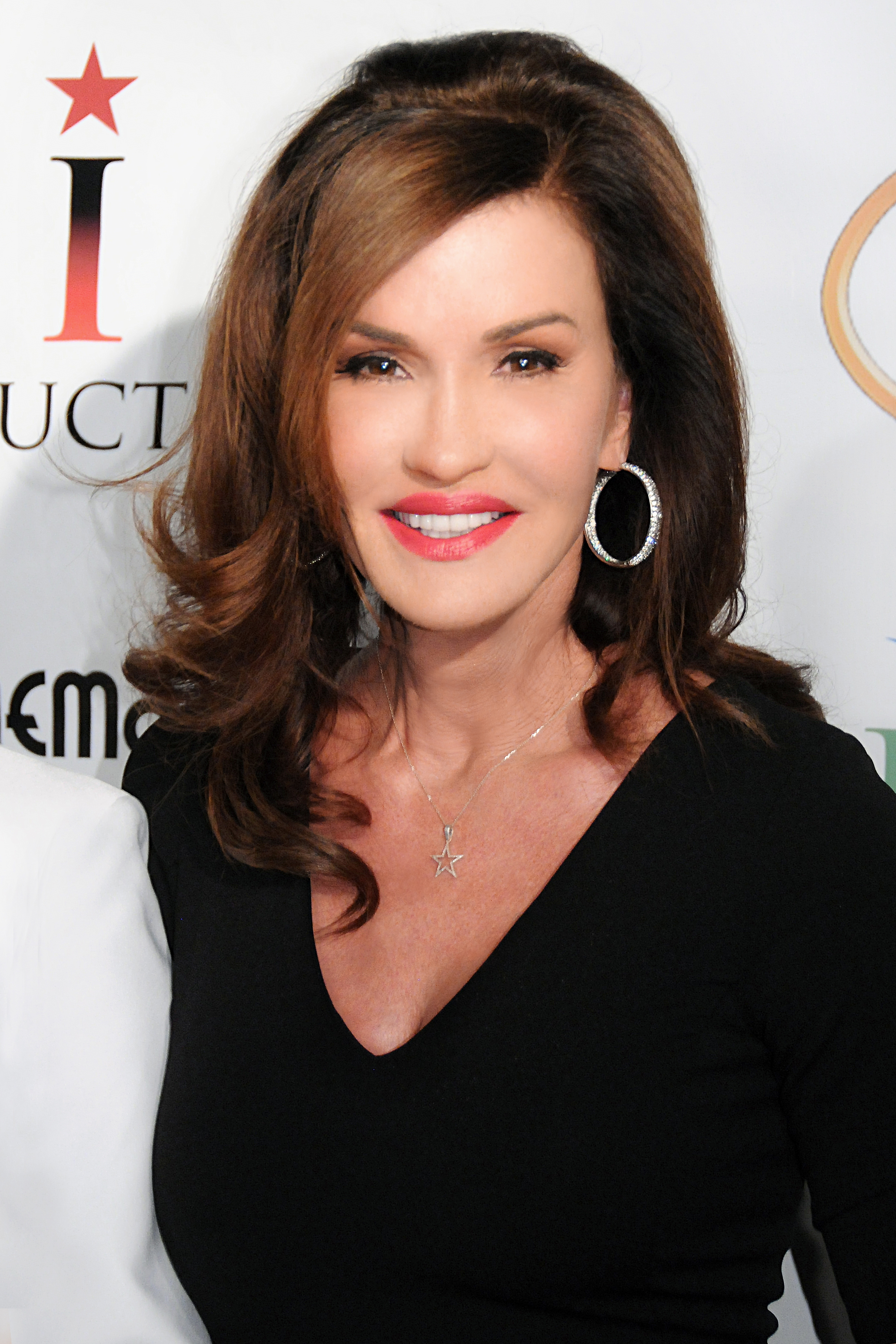
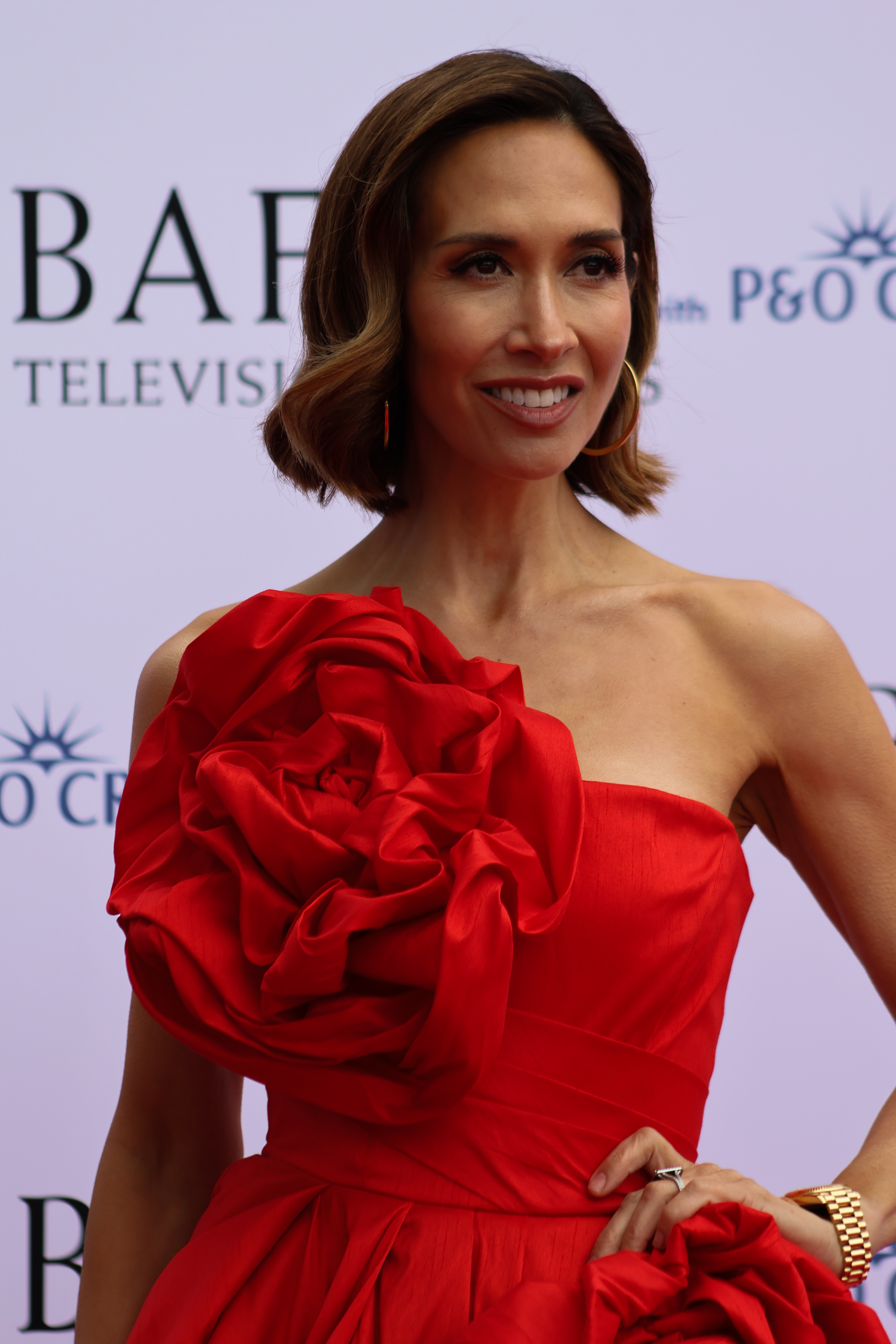
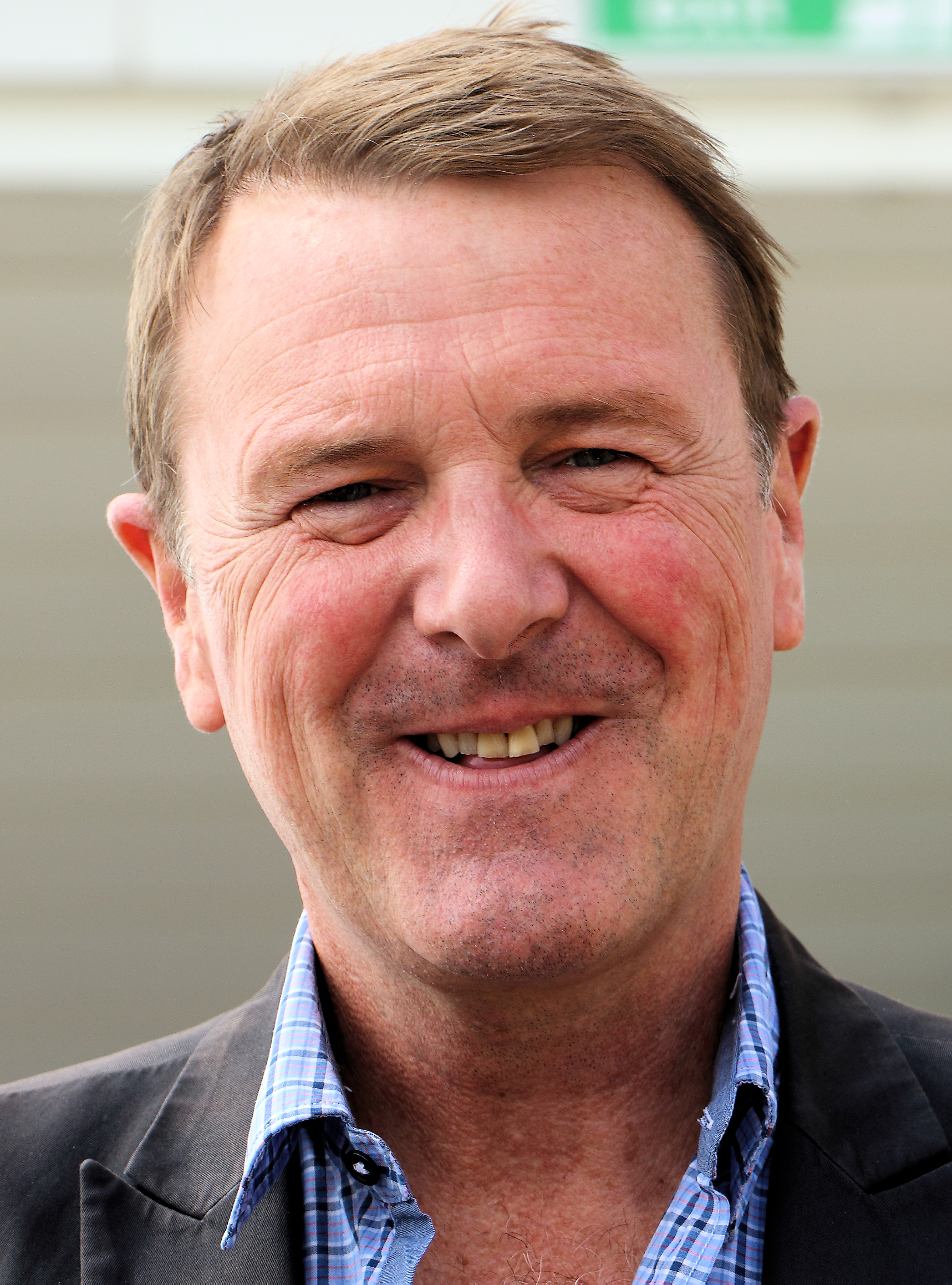
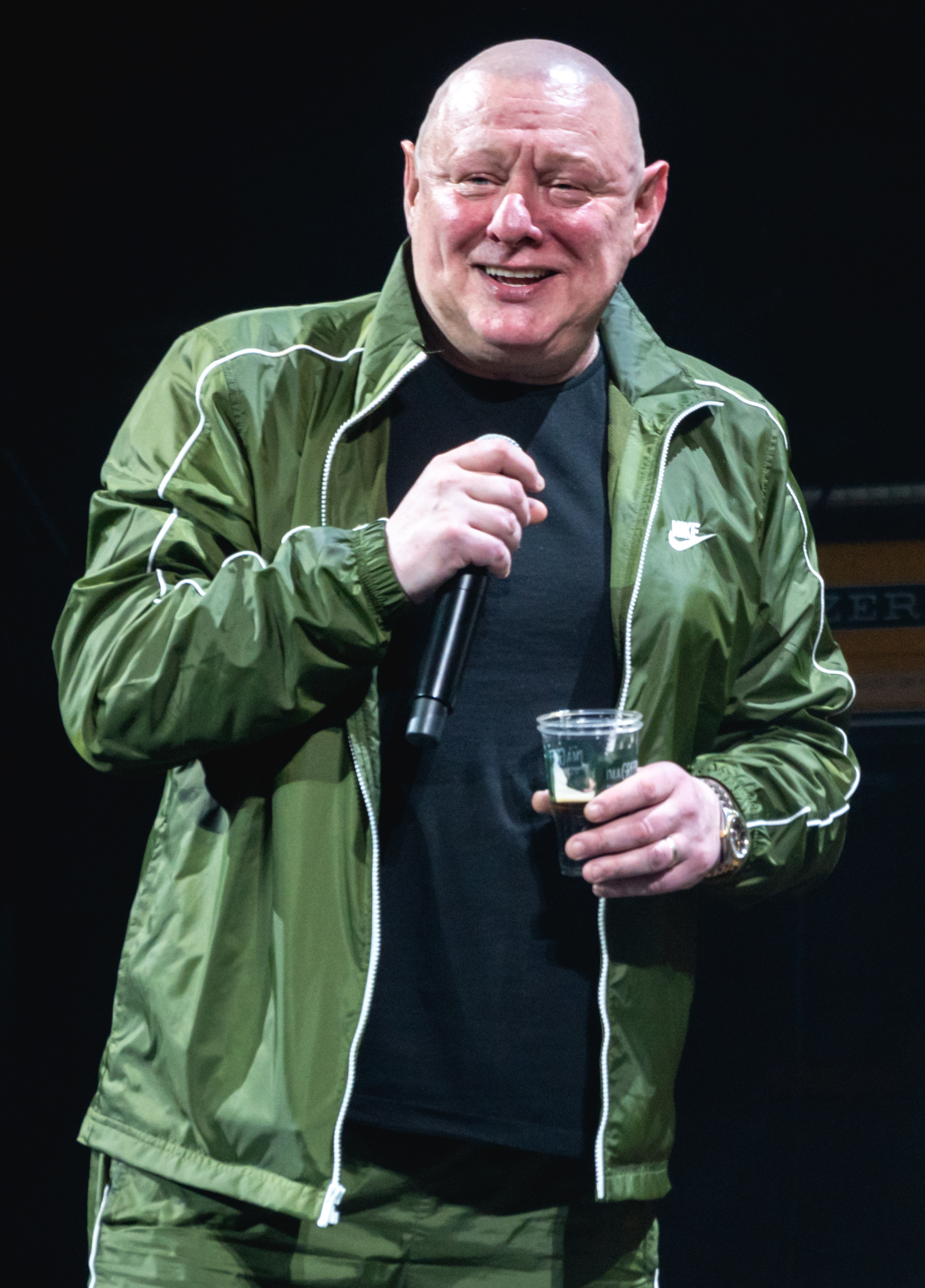
From left to right: Amir Khan, Carol Vorderman, Dean Gaffney, Fatima Whitbread, Gillian McKeith, Helen Flanagan, Janice Dickinson, Myleene Klass, Phil Tufnell, and Shaun Ryder.
Not pictured: Andy Whyment, Georgia Toffolo, Joe Swash, Jordan Banjo, and Paul Burrell.

Celebrity	Known for	Original position	Status
Myleene Klass	Former Hear'Say singer & presenter	Series 6 (2nd)	Winner on 12 May 2023
Jordan Banjo	Diversity dancer & Kiss FM presenter	Series 16 (9th)	Runner-up on 12 May 2023
Fatima Whitbread	Former Olympic javelin thrower	Series 11 (3rd)	Third place on 12 May 2023
Phil Tufnell	Former England cricketer	Series 2 (1st)	Eliminated 11th on 12 May 2023
Carol Vorderman	Former Countdown presenter	Series 16 (8th)	Eliminated 9th & 10th on 11 May 2023
Paul Burrell	Former Royal Household butler & author	Series 4 (2nd) (Note: Paul Burrell also competed on the 4th season of the Australian version of the show, placing 9th.)	Eliminated 9th & 10th on 11 May 2023
Dean Gaffney	Former EastEnders actor	Series 6 (5th)	Eliminated 7th & 8th on 10 May 2023
Helen Flanagan	Former Coronation Street actress	Series 12 (7th)	Eliminated 7th & 8th on 10 May 2023
Joe Swash	Former EastEnders actor & TV presenter	Series 8 (1st)	Eliminated 6th on 9 May 2023
Janice Dickinson	Supermodel & television personality	Series 7 (2nd)	Withdrew on 8 May 2023
Andy Whyment	Coronation Street actor	Series 19 (2nd)	Eliminated 4th & 5th on 8 May 2023
Georgia "Toff" Toffolo	Former Made in Chelsea personality	Series 17 (1st)	Eliminated 4th & 5th on 8 May 2023
Amir Khan	Former professional boxer	Series 17 (5th)	Eliminated 3rd on 2 May 2023
Gillian McKeith	Nutritionist & television presenter	Series 10 (8th)	Eliminated 1st & 2nd on 28 April 2023
Shaun Ryder	Happy Mondays singer	Series 10 (2nd)	Eliminated 1st & 2nd on 28 April 2023

== Results and elimination ==
Winner
Runner-up
Eliminated by survival trial
Eliminated by majority vote
Immune
Withdrew

Daily results per celebrity
Celebrity	Day 5	Day 7	Day 10	Day 12		Day 13	Day 14		Day 15	Number of trials	Chest Challenges
Celebrity	Day 5	Day 7	Day 10	Trial 1	Trial 2	Day 13	Vote	Trial	Day 15	Number of trials	Chest Challenges
Myleene	Safe	Safe	Safe	Safe	Safe	Safe	Safe	Safe	Winner (Day 15)	9	0
Jordan	Safe	Safe	Safe	Safe	Safe	Safe	Safe	Safe	Runner-up (Day 15)	10	0
Fatima	Safe	Safe	Safe	Safe	Safe	Safe	Safe	3rd	Eliminated (Day 14)	8	0
Phil	Safe	Safe	Safe	Safe	Safe	Safe	4th	Eliminated (Day 14)		6	1
Carol	Safe	Safe	Safe	Safe	Safe	5th/6th	Eliminated (Day 13)			5	1
Paul	Safe	Safe	Safe	Safe	Safe	5th/6th	Eliminated (Day 13)			5	1
Dean	Not in Camp		Immune	Safe	7th/8th	Eliminated (Day 12)				2	0
Helen	Safe	Safe	Safe	Safe	7th/8th	Eliminated (Day 12)				4	0
Joe	Not in Camp		Immune	9th	Eliminated (Day 12)					2	0
Janice	Safe	Safe	10th	Withdrew (Day 11)						2	0
Andy	Safe	Safe	11th/12th	Eliminated (Day 10)						3	1
Toff	Safe	Safe	11th/12th	Eliminated (Day 10)						4	0
Amir	Safe	13th	Eliminated (Day 7)							3	0
Gillian	14th/15th	Eliminated (Day 5)								1	1
Shaun	14th/15th	Eliminated (Day 5)								2	1
Notes	1	2	3, 4	None			5	None			
Survival trial (competitors)	Andy, Gillian, Jordan, Phil, Shaun, Toff	None	Andy, Jordan, Myleene, Toff	Joe, Phil	Carol, Dean, Fatima, Helen, Jordan, Myleene, Paul, Phil	Carol, Fatima, Jordan, Myleene, Paul, Phil	None	Fatima, Jordan, Myleene	Jordan, Myleene		
Eliminated	Gillian; Lost survival trial	Amir; Most votes to eliminate	Andy; Lost survival trial	Joe; Lost survival trial	Dean; Lost survival trial	Carol; Lost survival trial	Phil; Former campmates' choice to eliminate	Fatima; Lost survival trial	Jordan; Lost final trial		
Eliminated	Shaun; Lost survival trial	Amir; Most votes to eliminate	Toff; Lost survival trial	Joe; Lost survival trial	Helen; Lost survival trial	Paul; Lost survival trial	Phil; Former campmates' choice to eliminate	Fatima; Lost survival trial	Myleene; Won final trial		

Notes

- ^Note 1: The celebrities competed this survival trial in pairs. Andy and Jordan finished 1st, Phil and Toff finished second and Shaun and Gillian finished 3rd, resulting in their elimination.
- ^Note 2: The celebrities took part in a secret ballot, in which each of them voted for who they wanted to leave camp. The celebrity with the most votes was eliminated.
- ^Note 3: As "pride leaders", Dean and Joe were immune from this trial and each had to choose two celebrities from their pride to compete in pairs. The pair from the losing pride were eliminated.
- ^Note 4: Janice was safe from elimination, however withdrew from the competition in the early hours of Day 11.
- ^Note 5: The eliminated celebrities returned to camp and had to collectively decide as a group who would reach the final and ultimately choose which celebrity would be eliminated.

== Trials ==
The contestants take part in daily trials to earn food. These trials aim to test both physical and mental abilities. The winner is usually determined by the number of stars collected during the trial, with each star representing a meal earned by the winning contestant for their fellow campmates.

The contestants decided who would face the trial
The trial was compulsory.

Trial number	Air date	Name of trial	Celebrity participation	Winner/Number of stars	Notes
1	24 April	The Deadly Drop	Amir; Carol; Jordan	3/3 stars	—N/a
2	24 April	Trees of Torment	Janice; Paul; Shaun	3/3 stars	—N/a
3	24 April	Newton's Cradle	Fatima; Helen; Phil	0/3 stars	—N/a
4	25 April	Bush Banquet	Janice; Jordan	5/10 stars	—N/a
5	26 April	Dreaded Drain	Toff	8/10 stars	1
6	27 April	Up to Your Neck in It	Andy; Myleene	Myleene	2
7	27 April	Supermarket Shriek	Amir	10/10 stars	—N/a
8	1 May	World's End	Amir; Helen; Myleene	11/11 stars	—N/a
9	2 May	Tanks of Torment	Carol	7/10 stars	3
9	2 May	Tanks of Torment	Fatima	7/10 stars	3
10	2/3 May	Flippin' Disgusting	Dean; Joe	6/10 stars	4
11	3 May	Snakes & Ladders	Fatima; Jordan; Myleene; Toff	Jordan; Myleene	5
12	4 May	Bug-tanical Gardens	Helen; Paul	Helen	5
13	8 May	Deadly Depths	Fatima	3/9 stars	—N/a
14	10 May	Wicked Wall	Carol; Paul	3/6 stars	—N/a
15	11 May	South African Cyclone	Fatima; Jordan; Myleene; Phil	4/4 stars	—N/a

Notes

- ^Note 1: The three new celebrities, Andy, Myleene and Toff entered the "Savannah Scrub", while the other celebrities had to select one of them to join them in main camp and ultimately take part in the trial. They chose Toff, who upon joining the camp had to select a celebrity from main camp to take her place in "Savannah Scrub". She chose Shaun.
- ^Note 2: Andy and Myleene competed in a head to head trial to determine which of them would earn a place in main camp. The winner then had to choose a celebrity from main camp to take their place in "Savannah Scrub". Myleene won the trial and chose Phil to take her place.
- ^Note 3: Carol was chosen to take part in the trial and had to pick another celebrity to join her. She chose Fatima.
- ^Note 4: Instead of competing for meals for camp, Dean and Joe were instead playing to win the other celebrities' treats. Therefore each star represents a treat for a camp.
- ^Note 5: The camp was split into two teams, known as "prides". Dean and Joe were appointed captains, and had to choose which members of their pride would compete in the trial. The winning team were rewarded with a picnic, while the losing team were on rations of rice and beans.

== Survival Trials ==
In a change to the format due to this series being pre-recorded, there was no public voting and the contestants instead take part in survival trials to determine who is eliminated each day.

The contestants decided who would face the trial
The trial was compulsory.
The celebrity lost the survival trial and was eliminated.
The celebrity lost the survival trial and finished in third place.
The celebrity lost the survival trial and finished as the runner-up.

Trial number	Air date	Name of trial	Celebrity participation	Eliminated	Notes
1	28 April	Savage Safari	Andy	Gillian; Shaun	1
1	28 April	Savage Safari	Jordan	Gillian; Shaun	1
1	28 April	Savage Safari	Phil	Gillian; Shaun	1
1	28 April	Savage Safari	Toff	Gillian; Shaun	1
1	28 April	Savage Safari	Shaun	Gillian; Shaun	1
1	28 April	Savage Safari	Gillian	Gillian; Shaun	1
2	5/8 May	Gold Rush	Andy; Jordan; Myleene; Toff	Andy; Toff	2
3	9 May	Temple of Doom	Joe; Phil	Joe	3
4	9/10 May	Crate Escape	Carol; Dean; Fatima; Helen; Jordan; Myleene; Paul; Phil	Dean; Helen	—N/a
5	11 May	Vile Vineyard	Carol; Fatima; Jordan; Myleene; Paul; Phil	Carol; Paul	—N/a
6	12 May	Critter Countdown	Fatima; Jordan; Myleene	Fatima	—N/a
7	12 May	All You Can Stomach	Jordan; Myleene	Jordan	—N/a

Notes

- ^Note 1: The three celebrities in "Savannah Scrub", Andy, Phil and Shaun had to choose a celebrity from main camp to pair up with and ultimately compete alongside them in the survival trial. Shaun chose Gillian, Phil chose Toff and Andy chose Jordan. The losing pair were eliminated.
- ^Note 2: Pride leaders Dean and Joe each had to choose two celebrities from their pride to face the survival trial.
- ^Note 3: Each campmate picked a stone out of a bag, the celebrity who selected the orange stone chose an additional celebrity to save from competing in the survival trial, that celebrity saved someone else and so on thus beginning a chain of safety until there were only two campmates remaining. Joe and Phil were not chosen and therefore faced the trial.

== Star count ==
Celebrity	Number of stars earned	Percentage
Myleene Klass	26/26 stars	100%
Jordan Banjo	23/28 stars	82%
Fatima Whitbread	14/26 stars	54%
Phil Tufnell	15/18 stars	83%
Carol Vorderman	13/19 stars	68%
Paul Burrell	6/9 stars	67%
Dean Gaffney	6/10 stars	60%
Helen Flanagan	11/14 stars	77%
Joe Swash	6/10 stars	60%
Janice Dickinson	8/13 stars	62%
Andy Whyment	11/11 stars	100%
Georgia "Toff" Toffolo	8/10 stars	80%
Amir Khan	24/24 stars	100%
Gillian McKeith		—N/a
Shaun Ryder	3/3 stars	100%

== Chest Challenges ==
As well as competing in the trials, celebrities have to complete 'Chest Challenges' to earn treats for the camp. At least two celebrities are chosen to compete in the challenge. These are often mental challenges, rather than challenges including critters. They must complete the challenge to be been given a key to the treasure chest. After completion of the challenge, the celebrities will take the treasure chest back to camp, where they and the other celebrities must answer a question. If they get the question right, the chest will open and they will earn the treat, but if they get it wrong, the chest won't open.

The celebrities got the question correct
The celebrities got the question wrong

Episode	Air date	Celebrities	Prize	Notes
2	25 April	Gillian; Shaun	Macadamia nuts	—N/a
3	26 April	Carol; Phil	Biltong	—N/a
8	3 May	Andy; Paul	Dried mango	1

- ^Note 1: Two celebrities from the losing pride took part in this challenge.

== Ratings ==
Official ratings are taken from BARB, using the four-screen dashboard which includes viewers who watched the programme on laptops, smartphones and tablets within 7 days of the original broadcast.

Episode	Air date	Official rating (millions incl. HD & +1)	Weekly rank for all UK TV channels
1	24 April	6.16	2
2	25 April	5.30	4
3	26 April	5.10	5
4	27 April	5.35	3
5	28 April	4.98	6
6	1 May	5.35	7
7	2 May	4.92	11
8	3 May	5.18	8
9	4 May	4.93	10
10	5 May	4.98	9
11	8 May	4.99	4
12	9 May	4.43	11
13	10 May	4.82	6
14	11 May	4.46	10
15	12 May	4.73	7
Series average	2023	5.05	—N/a
Unseen	19 May	2.45	46
