= I'm a Celebrity... South Africa =

British reality television series

- Genre: Reality television
- Presented by: Ant & Dec
- Starring: See list of contestants
- Theme music composer: Grant Buckerfield
- Country of origin: United Kingdom
- Original language: English
- No. of series: 2
- No. of episodes: 32

Production
- Executive producers: Chantal Boyle; Sophie Coen; Katrina Morrison; Olly Nash
- Production locations: Blyde River Canyon, South Africa; Versa Studios, London, United Kingdom (2026 final)
- Camera setup: Multi-camera
- Running time: 60–120 mins (including adverts)
- Production companies: Lifted Entertainment; Mitre Studios

Original release
- Network: ITV
- Release: 24 April 2023 – present

Related
- I'm a Celebrity...Get Me Out of Here! I'm a Celebrity: Unpacked; I'm a Celebrity...The Wild Frontier

I'm a Celebrity... South Africa is an ITV reality television series, with the premise of being an all star edition of I'm a Celebrity...Get Me Out of Here! featuring campmates from previous series, that has aired since 24 April 2023. As in the regular version, the programme is presented by Ant & Dec; however, it is pre-recorded instead of being broadcast live.

The first series aired between 24 April and 12 May 2023. The second series aired on 6 April 2026, with the final episode aired live from London on 24 April. On 28 April 2026, it was reported that the series would not return until 2029.

== Production ==
In April 2022, several news outlets reported that ITV had commissioned an "All-Stars" spin-off series of the show to be pre-recorded in South Africa, featuring former campmates that had competed in the series. ITV later confirmed the reports in September 2022, with filming beginning the same month and was completed prior to the beginning of the twenty-second regular series. The first series was filmed between September and October 2022 and aired between 24 April and 12 May 2023. It was won by series 6 runner-up Myleene Klass. It was reported in April 2024 that the spin-off had been shelved, however in September 2025, ITV confirmed that the show would return for a second series in 2026, with filming taking place in September 2025.

== Series overview ==
Series	Campmates	Presenters	Episodes	Originally released		Winner	Runner-up	Third place	Avg. viewers (millions)
Series	Campmates	Presenters	Episodes	First released	Last released	Winner	Runner-up	Third place	Avg. viewers (millions)
1	15	Ant & Dec	16	24 April 2023	12 May 2023	Myleene Klass	Jordan Banjo	Fatima Whitbread	5.05
2	12	Ant & Dec	16	6 April 2026	24 April 2026	Adam Thomas	Mo Farah	Harry Redknapp	3.52

=== Series 1 (2023) ===
Key
Winner and I'm a Celebrity… Legend
Runner-up
Third place
Walked/withdrew
Medically discharged
Late arrival

Celebrity	Known for	Original position	Entered	Exited	Finished
Myleene Klass	Former Hear'Say singer & presenter	Series 6 (2nd)	Day 3	Day 15	1st
Jordan Banjo	Diversity dancer & Kiss FM presenter	Series 16 (9th)	Day 1	Day 15	2nd
Fatima Whitbread	Former Olympic javelin thrower	Series 11 (3rd)	Day 1	Day 14	3rd
Phil Tufnell	Former England cricketer	Series 2 (1st)	Day 1	Day 14	4th
Carol Vorderman	Television presenter & former Countdown co-host	Series 16 (8th)	Day 1	Day 13	5th
Paul Burrell	Former Royal Household butler & author	Series 4 (2nd)	Day 1	Day 13	5th
Helen Flanagan	Former Coronation Street actress	Series 12 (7th)	Day 1	Day 12	7th
Dean Gaffney	Former EastEnders actor	Series 6 (5th)	Day 7	Day 12	7th
Joe Swash	Former EastEnders actor & television presenter	Series 8 (1st)	Day 7	Day 12	9th
Janice Dickinson	Supermodel & television personality	Series 7 (2nd)	Day 1	Day 11	10th
Andy Whyment	Coronation Street actor	Series 19 (2nd)	Day 3	Day 10	11th
Georgia "Toff" Toffolo	Former Made in Chelsea star	Series 17 (1st)	Day 3	Day 10	11th
Amir Khan	Former professional boxer	Series 17 (5th)	Day 1	Day 7	13th
Gillian McKeith	Nutritionist, author & television presenter	Series 10 (8th)	Day 1	Day 5	15th
Shaun Ryder	Happy Mondays singer	Series 10 (2nd)	Day 1	Day 5	15th

=== Series 2 (2026) ===
On 8 September 2025, Ant & Dec revealed that the series would return in 2026, with filming taking place in September 2025. In a change to the format, the second series featured a live final broadcast direct from London and a viewer vote to decide the winner.

The line-up was officially announced by ITV on 9 March 2026.

Celebrity	Known for	Original position	Entered	Exited	Finished
Adam Thomas	Waterloo Road & former Emmerdale actor	Series 16 (3rd)	Day 1	Day 15	1st
Mo Farah	Olympic long-distance runner & track athlete	Series 20 (5th)	Day 1	Day 15	2nd
Harry Redknapp	Former football manager	Series 18 (1st)	Day 6	Day 15	3rd
Craig Charles	Actor, presenter & DJ	Series 14 (11th)	Day 2	Day 15	4th
Scarlett Moffatt	Television personality & presenter	Series 16 (1st)	Day 1	Day 14	5th
Sinitta	Singer & television personality	Series 11 (11th)	Day 1	Day 13	6th
Ashley Roberts	Former The Pussycat Dolls singer	Series 12 (2nd)	Day 1	Day 13	7th
Jimmy Bullard	Former Premier League footballer	Series 14 (10th)	Day 6	Day 12	8th
Beverley Callard	Former Coronation Street actress	Series 20 (9th)	Day 1	Day 12	9th
Gemma Collins	Media personality & businesswoman	Series 14 (12th)	Day 2	Day 11	10th
David Haye	Former professional boxer	Series 12 (3rd)	Day 1	Day 11	11th
Seann Walsh	Stand-up comedian	Series 22 (5th)	Day 1	Day 8	12th

== Reception ==
The series was described by Anita Singh of The Daily Telegraph as a "reliable ratings winner" for ITV, however described the line-up of the first series as "steady" and added that "the jeopardy is lower than usual because everyone knows what they're doing." It was criticised by Rebecca Nicholson on The Guardian, who described the show as "missing a spark". Speaking of the pre-recorded element, she said "The lack of a public vote and no public interaction makes such a difference. To see Ant and Dec jauntily skip down the path to deliver the latest twist, to bring in the "new addition" who will stir things up in camp, and for it not to be live, for it to have already happened without any sense that the viewers are directly involved in its ups and downs, smoothes it out and makes it feel less like a TV titan and more just a regular part of the schedules. It's still I'm a Celebrity, and if you like it, you'll still like it. But, legends or otherwise, this is not the show at its best."
