= Adam Thomas =

English actor (born 1988)

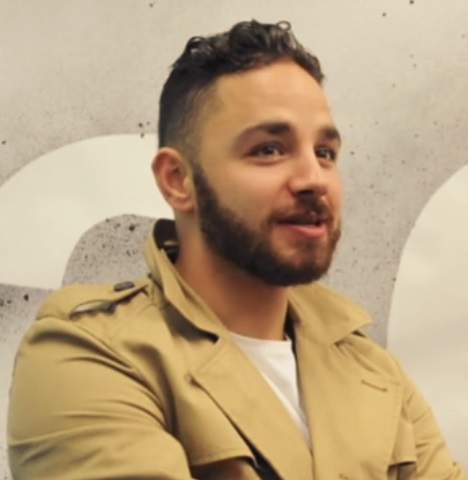
- Thomas in 2014
- Born: Adam Gordon Thomas; 11 August 1988 (age 38); Salford, Greater Manchester, England
- Occupations: Actor, Television Presenter
- Years active: 2002–present
- Television: Doctors (2002, 2007, 2009) Waterloo Road (2006–2009), (2023–present); Emmerdale (2009–2018); I'm a Celebrity...Get Me Out of Here! (2016) All Star Mr & Mrs (2016) I'm a Celebrity: Extra Camp (2019); Strictly Come Dancing (2023) 99 to Beat (2025) I'm a Celebrity... South Africa (2026)
- Spouse: Caroline Daly (m. 2017)
- Children: 2
- Relatives: Ryan Thomas (brother); Scott Thomas (twin brother)

Adam Gordon Thomas (born 11 August 1988) is an English actor, known for his roles as Donte Charles in Waterloo Road (2006–2009, 2023–present) and Adam Barton in Emmerdale (2009–2018). He was a contestant on I'm a Celebrity...Get Me Out of Here! in 2016 and Strictly Come Dancing in 2023. He also won the second series of I'm a Celebrity... South Africa in 2026.

== Early life ==
Adam Gordon Thomas was born on 11 August 1988 in Salford, Greater Manchester, England.

== Career ==
Thomas began his television career in 2002 with a guest appearance on the BBC daytime soap opera Doctors. From 2006 to 2009, Thomas played Donte Charles in the BBC One school-based drama series Waterloo Road from series 1 until series 4. The role of Donte led Thomas to enjoy guest appearances in popular hospital drama Casualty in 2008 in which he played a boxer, as well as a second appearance in Doctors in 2007. He also appeared as himself on ITV gameshow All Star Family Fortunes alongside his older brother and fellow actor Ryan, who played Jason Grimshaw in the soap opera, Coronation Street.

Following his departure from Waterloo Road in 2009, Thomas signed on for his third appearance on daytime soap Doctors, this time playing a character called Ben Hamilton. The episode aired on 26 May 2009. It was announced on 21 May 2009 that Thomas had landed the role of Adam Barton in the long-running ITV soap opera, Emmerdale, and would appear on screens from July 2009. Thomas left Emmerdale in early 2018.

In 2016, Thomas was a contestant on the sixteenth series of I'm a Celebrity...Get Me Out of Here! and finished in third place. He became a property executive for the Kamani Property Group in 2018 alongside former Emmerdale co-star Marc Silcock. He also made his stage debut in 2018 when he appeared as The Hollywood Producer in Nativity! The Musical. In February 2019, he portrayed the role of Rob in an episode of the BBC drama Moving On. On 19 October 2019, it was announced that Thomas would be co-hosting I'm a Celebrity: Extra Camp. In September 2019, Thomas opened a bar/restaurant with his school friend, Scott Graham. The restaurant, named The Spinn, was situated in Gatley, Stockport, but it later closed. Thomas's historic and publicly documented alcoholism led to him resigning as director of the limited company as early as mid-2022.

In late 2021, it was announced that Thomas was returning to the role of Donte Charles in recommissioned return of Waterloo Road for the first time since 2015, and marks his first appearance on Waterloo Road in nearly 14 years. In August 2023, Thomas was announced as one of the contestants on the twenty-first series of Strictly Come Dancing. He exited the competition in week 7, (4 November) with his professional dance partner, Luba Mushtuk. This followed their dance off against Angela Rippon and her professional dance partner Kai Widdrington.

In 2025, he and his older brother Ryan hosted ITV1 game show 99 to Beat.

In April 2026, Thomas won series 2 of I'm a Celebrity... South Africa.

== Personal life ==
Thomas is the younger brother of Coronation Street star Ryan Thomas, and older brother of non-identical twin Love Island star Scott Thomas.

He is of English, Indian and Caribbean ancestry. His paternal grandfather is from Mumbai, India, and emigrated to Manchester, England, in 1947. His paternal great-grandmother was a West Indian who had Caribbean ancestry.

Thomas and his long‑term girlfriend, Caroline Daly, have two children, a son and a daughter.

Thomas and Daly took part in All Star Mr & Mrs in August 2016.

In August 2020, Thomas admitted that he and his twin have a drinking problem; he vowed to get sober like his brother who celebrated six months of sobriety at the time.

== Filmography ==
Year	Title	Role	Notes	Ref.
2002	Doctors	Declan	1 Episode: "Losing Control"	
2004	Casualty	Jamie Ridderford	1 Episode: "Love Bites"	
2006–2009, 2023–present	Waterloo Road	Donte Charles	105 episodes	
2007	Doctors	Rohan Jameson	1 Episode: "Growing Pains"	
2008	Casualty	Jake Shepherd	1 Episode: "To Thine Own Self Be True"	
2008	Rock On Troglodyte	Man In Distress	1 Episode: "Trog In Bognor Regis"	
2009	Michael McIntyre's Comedy Roadshow	Audience Member	1 Episode	
2009	Doctors	Ben Hamilton	1 Episode: "Hamilton Is Out"	
2009–2018	Emmerdale	Adam Barton	971 episodes	
2014	All Star Family Fortunes	Self	1 Episode	
2016	Lorraine	Self	4 December 2016	
2016	This Morning	Self	1 December 2016	
2016	Good Morning Britain	Self	1 episode	
2016	I'm a Celebrity... Get Me Out of Here!	Contestant	Series 16	
2018	Lorraine	Self	25 October 2018	
2019	Moving On	Rob	1 episode: "By Any Other Name"	
2019	Pitching In	Jase	Main role	
2019	I'm a Celebrity: Extra Camp	Presenter		
2020	Lorraine	Self	20th May 2020	
2020	Don't Rock The Boat	Contestant		
2021	The Chase Celebrity Special	Contestant		
2022	Britain's Foulest Smells	Self		
2022	Royal Television Society	Presenter	North West	
2023	Strictly Come Dancing	Contestant	Series 21	
2025	99 to Beat	Co-presenter	With Ryan Thomas	
2025	You Bet!	Panellist		
2026	I'm a Celebrity...South Africa	Winner	Series 2	

== Stage ==
Year	Title	Role	Notes
2018	Nativity! The Musical	The Hollywood Producer	Liverpool Empire Theatre Regent Theatre, Stoke-on-Trent

== Awards and nominations ==
Year	Award	Category	Work	Result	Ref.
2010	TV Choice Awards	Best Soap Newcomer	Emmerdale	Won	
2011	Inside Soap Awards	Sexiest Male	Emmerdale	Nominated	
2013	Inside Soap Awards	Sexiest Male	Emmerdale	Shortlisted	
2023	Inside Soap Awards	Best Drama Star	Waterloo Road	Nominated	
