= I'm a Celebrity... South Africa series 2 =

I'm a Celebrity... South Africa
- Series 2
- Presented by: Anthony McPartlin; Declan Donnelly
- No. of days: 15
- No. of castaways: 12
- Winner: Adam Thomas
- Runner-up: Mo Farah
- Location: Blyde River Canyon, South Africa; Versa Studios, London, United Kingdom (live final)
- Companion show: I'm a Celebrity: Unpacked
- No. of episodes: 16

Release
- Original network: ITV
- Original release: 6 April – 24 April 2026

Additional information
- Filming dates: September 2025

Series chronology
- ← Previous; Series 1

The second series of I'm a Celebrity... South Africa began airing on ITV on 6 April 2026. Ant & Dec returned to present the series, which was pre-recorded in September 2025, excluding the final.

The series concluded on 24 April 2026, with a live final and cast reunion broadcast from London, in which series 16 finalist Adam Thomas was declared the winner of the series, with series 20 contestant Mo Farah finishing as the runner-up, and series 18 winner Harry Redknapp in third place.

== Production ==
Following the first series of the spin-off with aired between April and May 2023, it was reported that the spin-off had been shelved. However, in February 2025, it was confirmed that the show would return for a second series in 2026, with the series being teased to feature "memorable campmates from series gone by" [...] who will "face brand new trials and challenges in the South African wilderness." Filming took place in South Africa in September 2025, with ITV confirming that in a format change for this series, the final would be broadcast live from the United Kingdom, with the public deciding the winner. On 30 March 2026, a short preview of the upcoming series was broadcast that evening on ITV. The live grand final will be held on 24 April 2026 at the Versa Studios in London.

For the first time, I'm a Celebrity: Unpacked aired as a pre-recorded podcast accompanying the all-star series, with a live episode broadcast on ITV2 following the main programme's live final. Unpacked is hosted by Sam Thompson and Kemi Rodgers. Thompson is based in a UK recording studio and is joined by guests, with Rodgers interviewing Ant & Dec on location in South Africa.

== Celebrities ==
The line-up for the series was officially announced by ITV on 9 March 2026. Eight celebrities entered the camp on the first day, followed by four late arrivals. Craig Charles and Gemma Collins entered the camp on Day 2, with Harry Redknapp and Jimmy Bullard joining on Day 6. Beverley Callard was forced to withdraw from the series on medical grounds in the episode broadcast on 21 April.

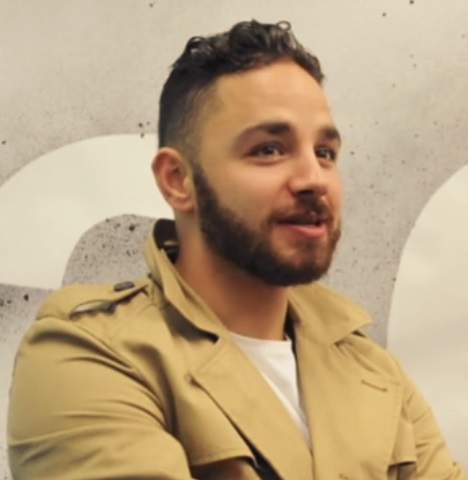
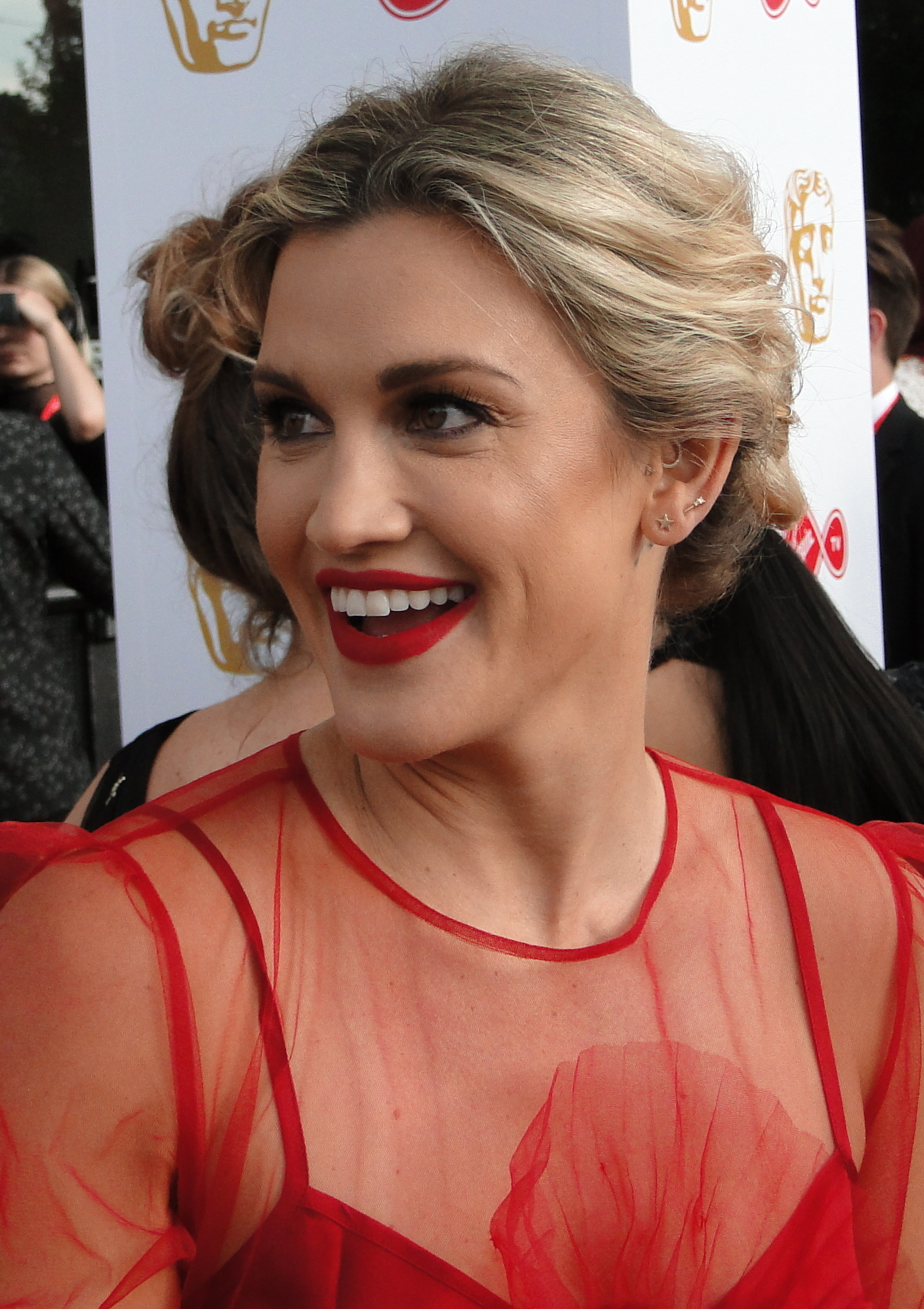
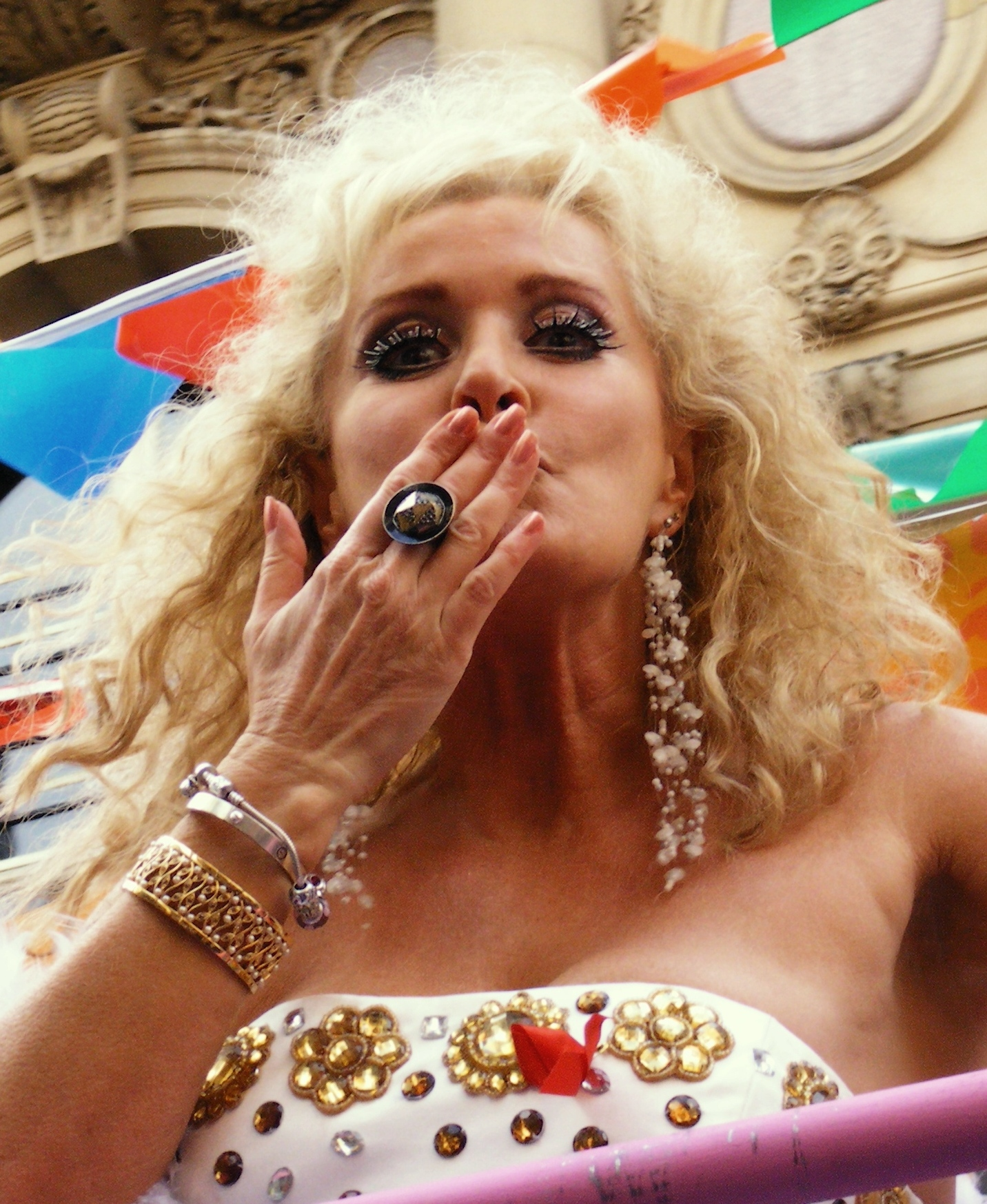
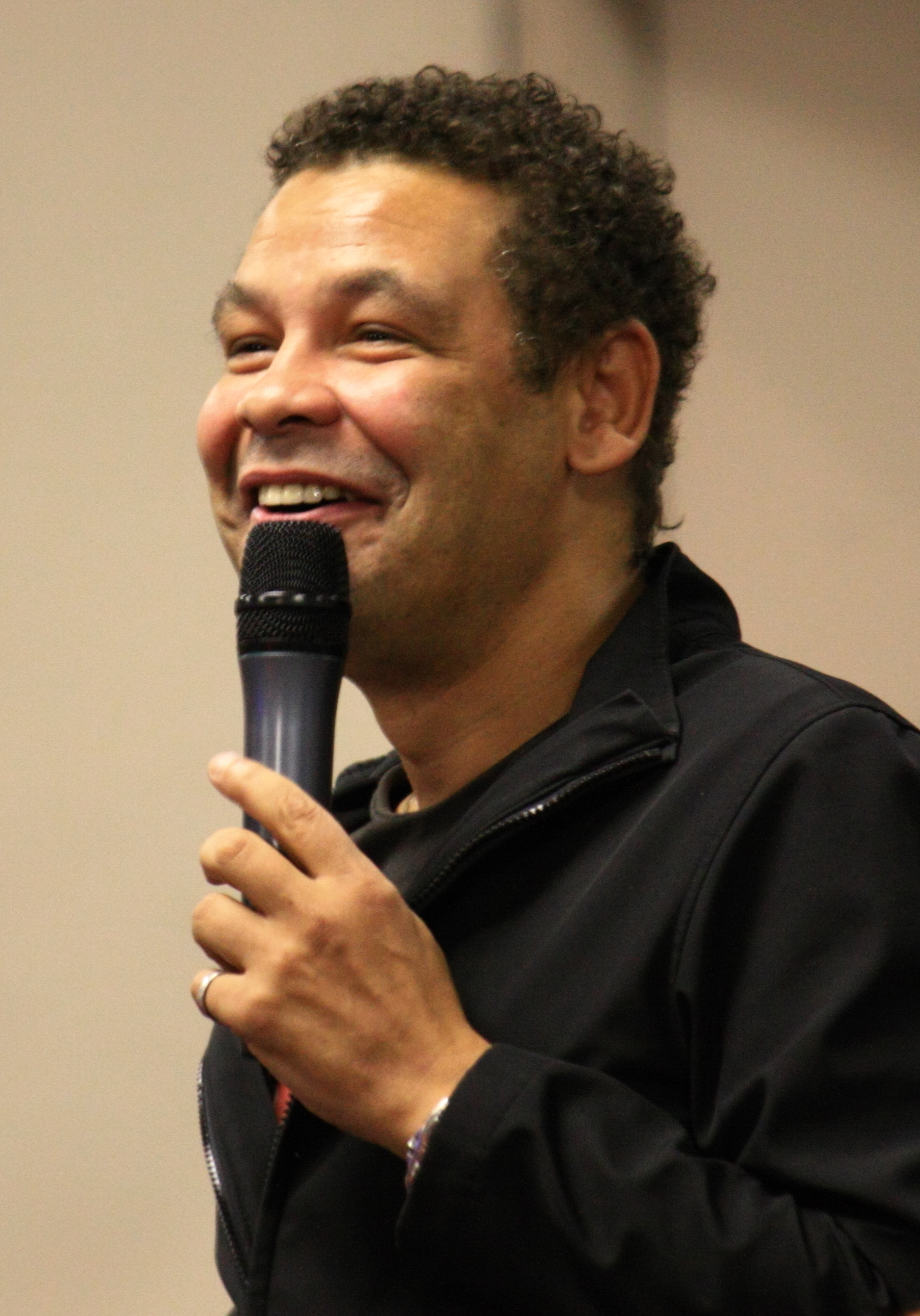
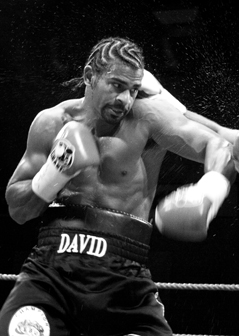
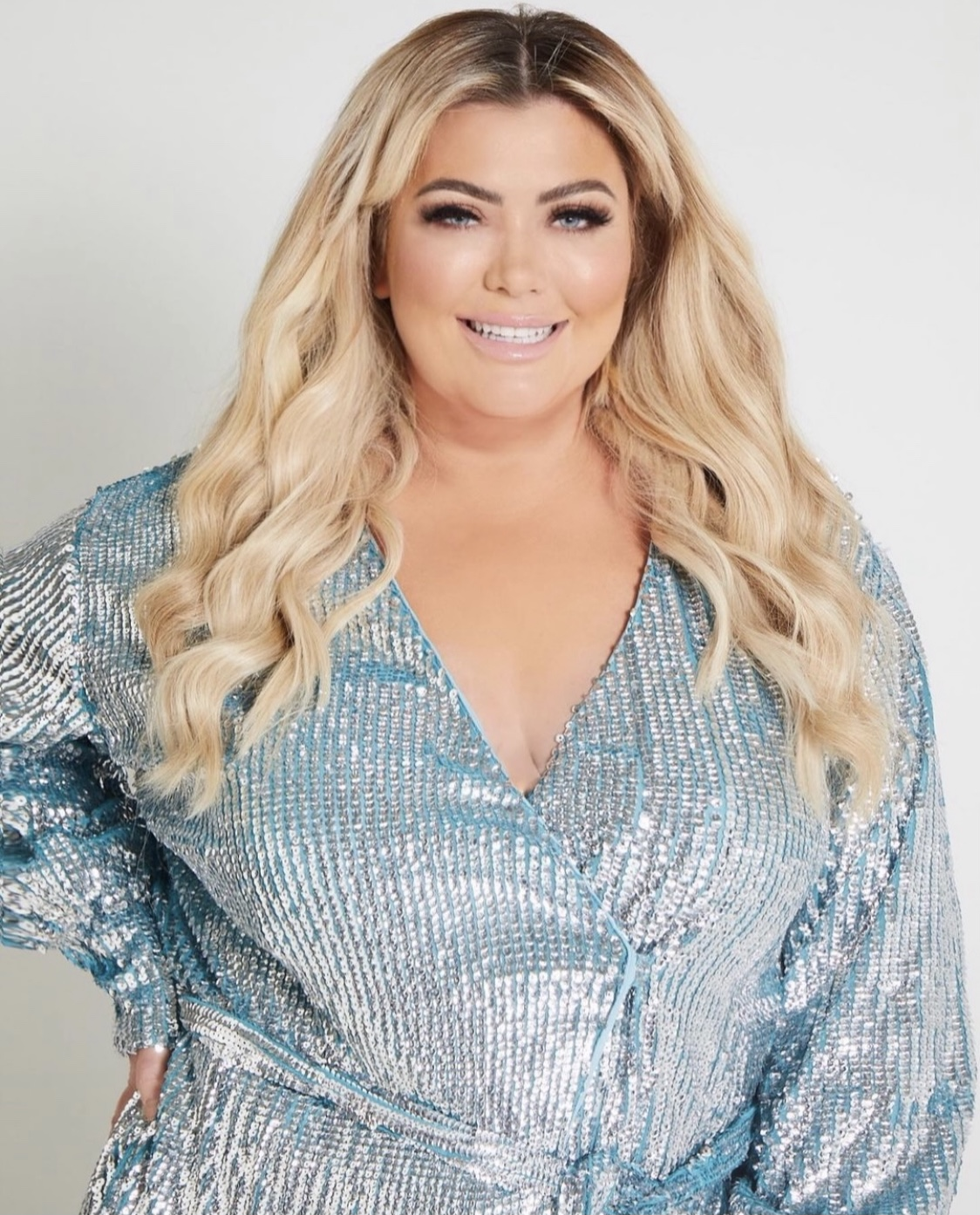
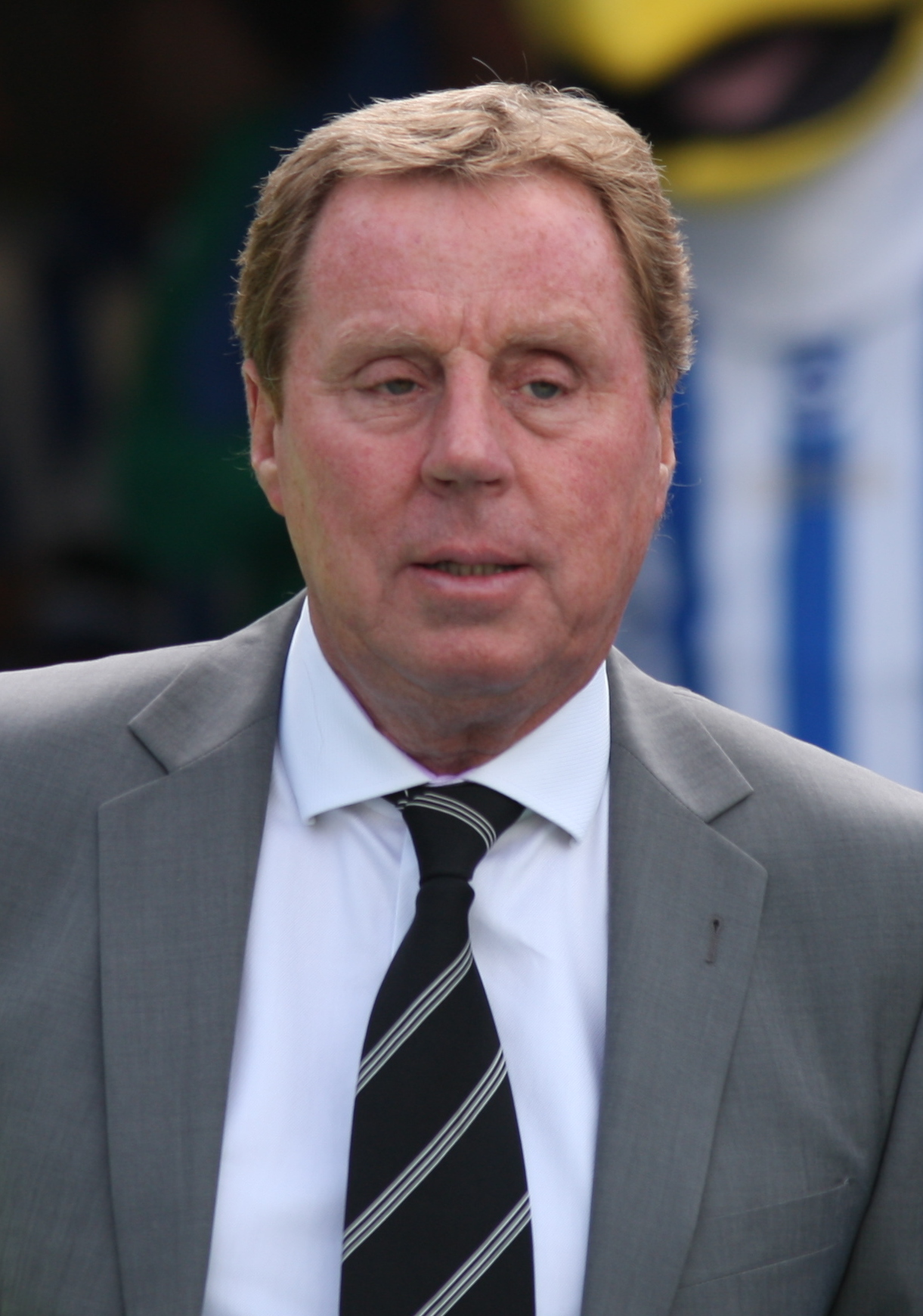
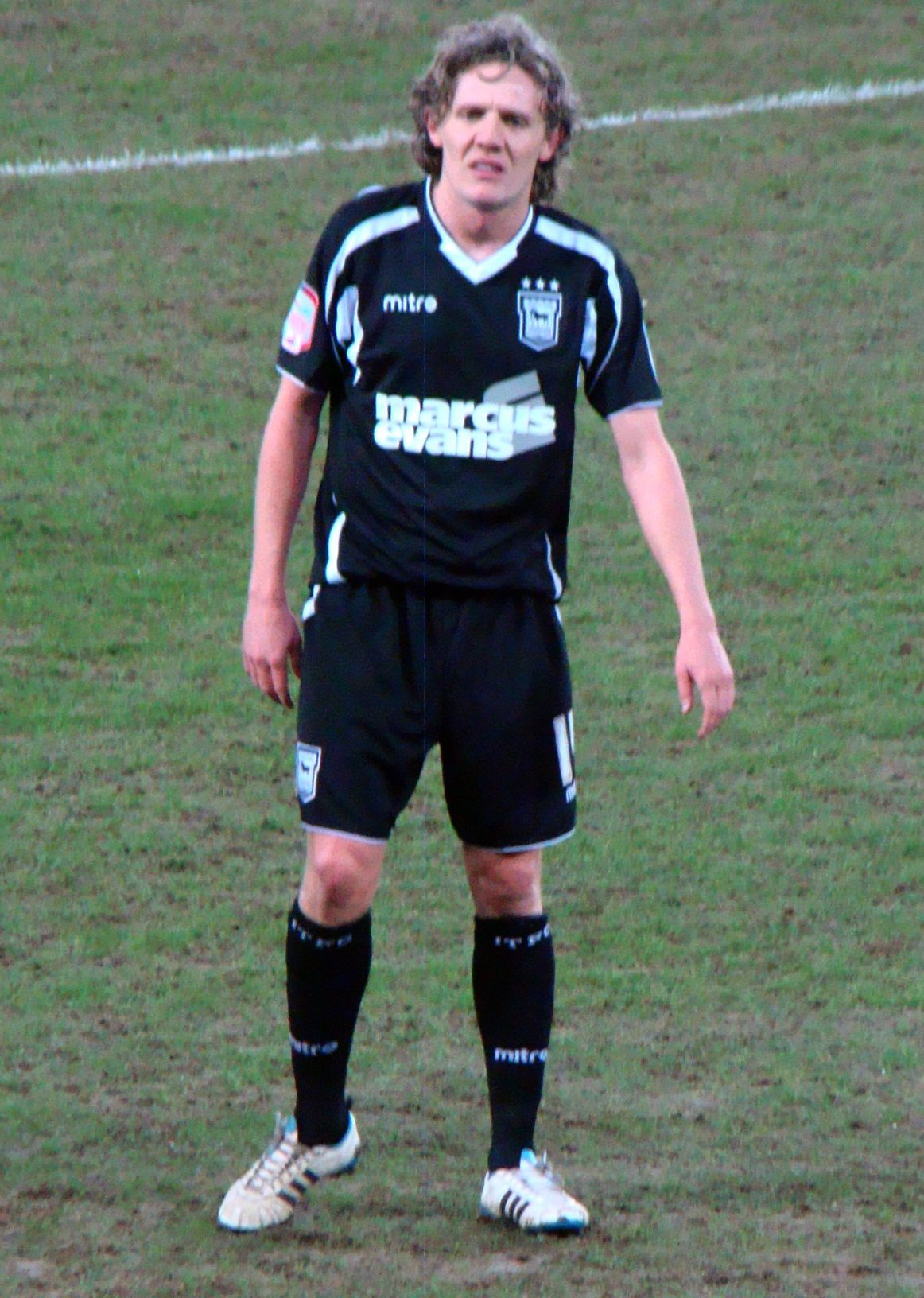
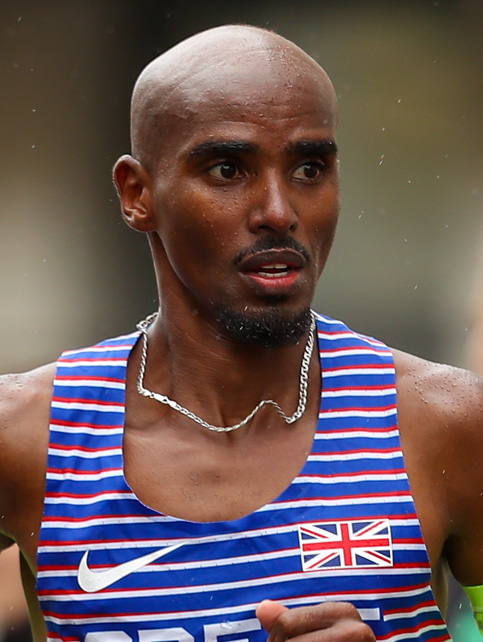
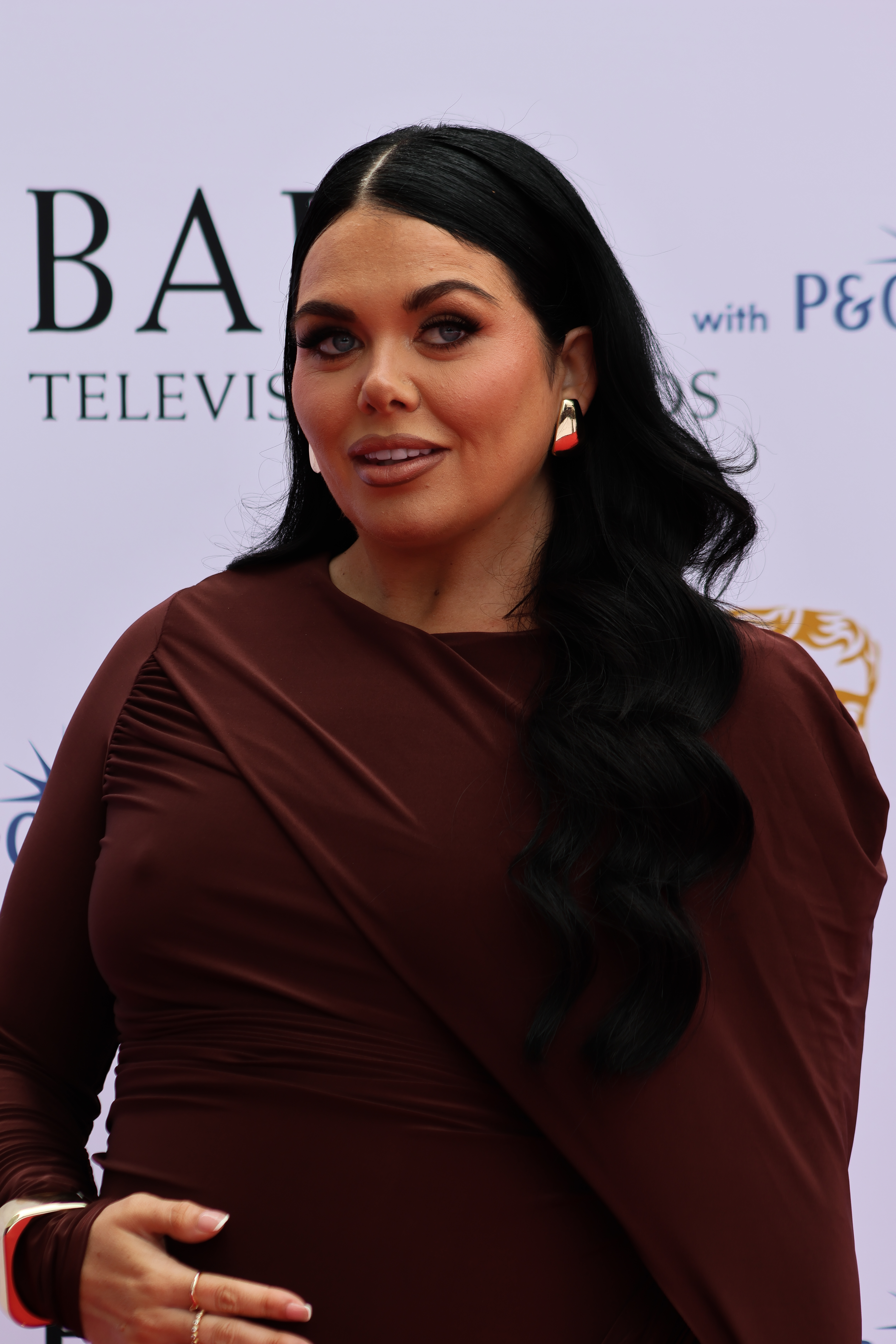
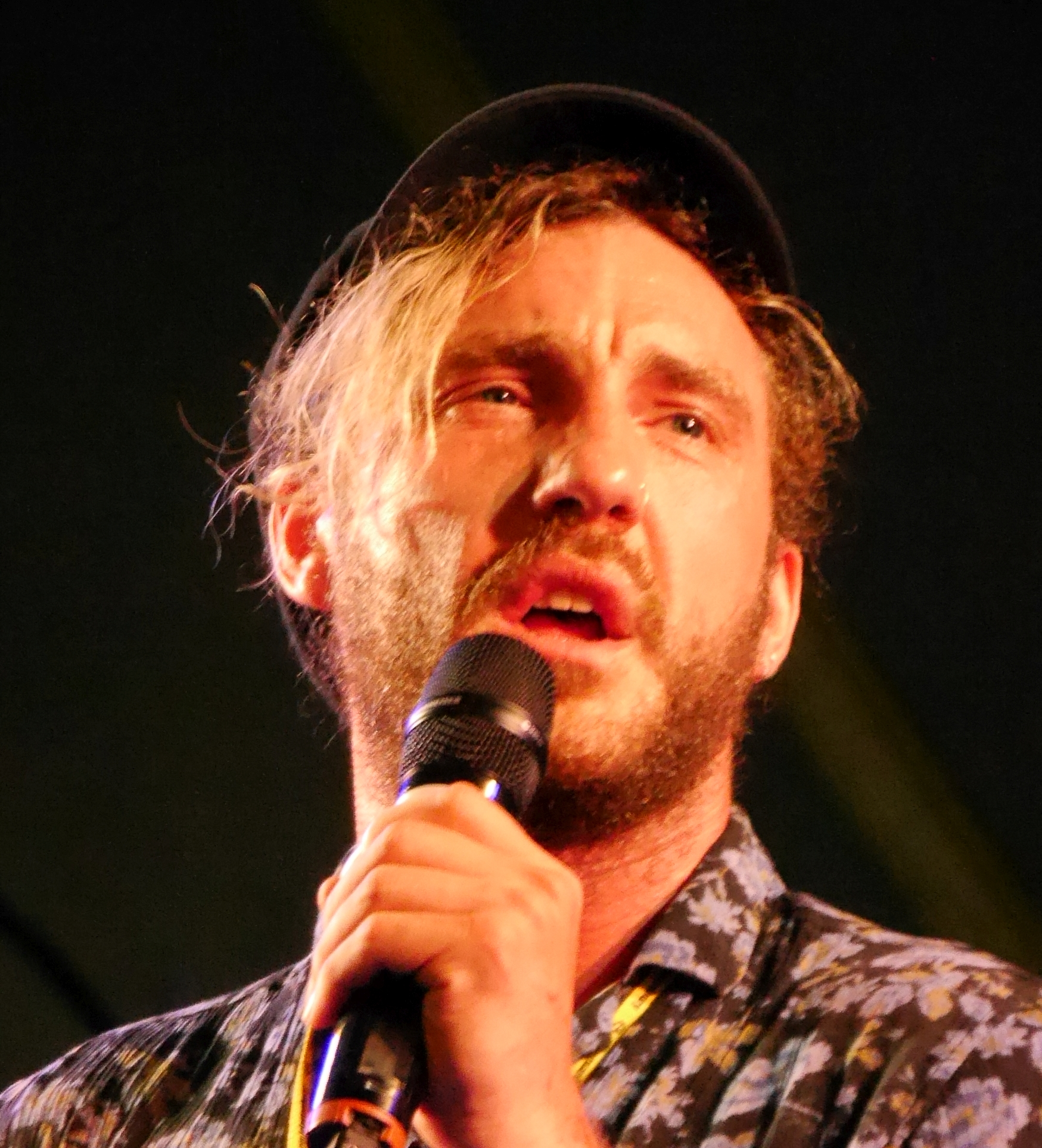
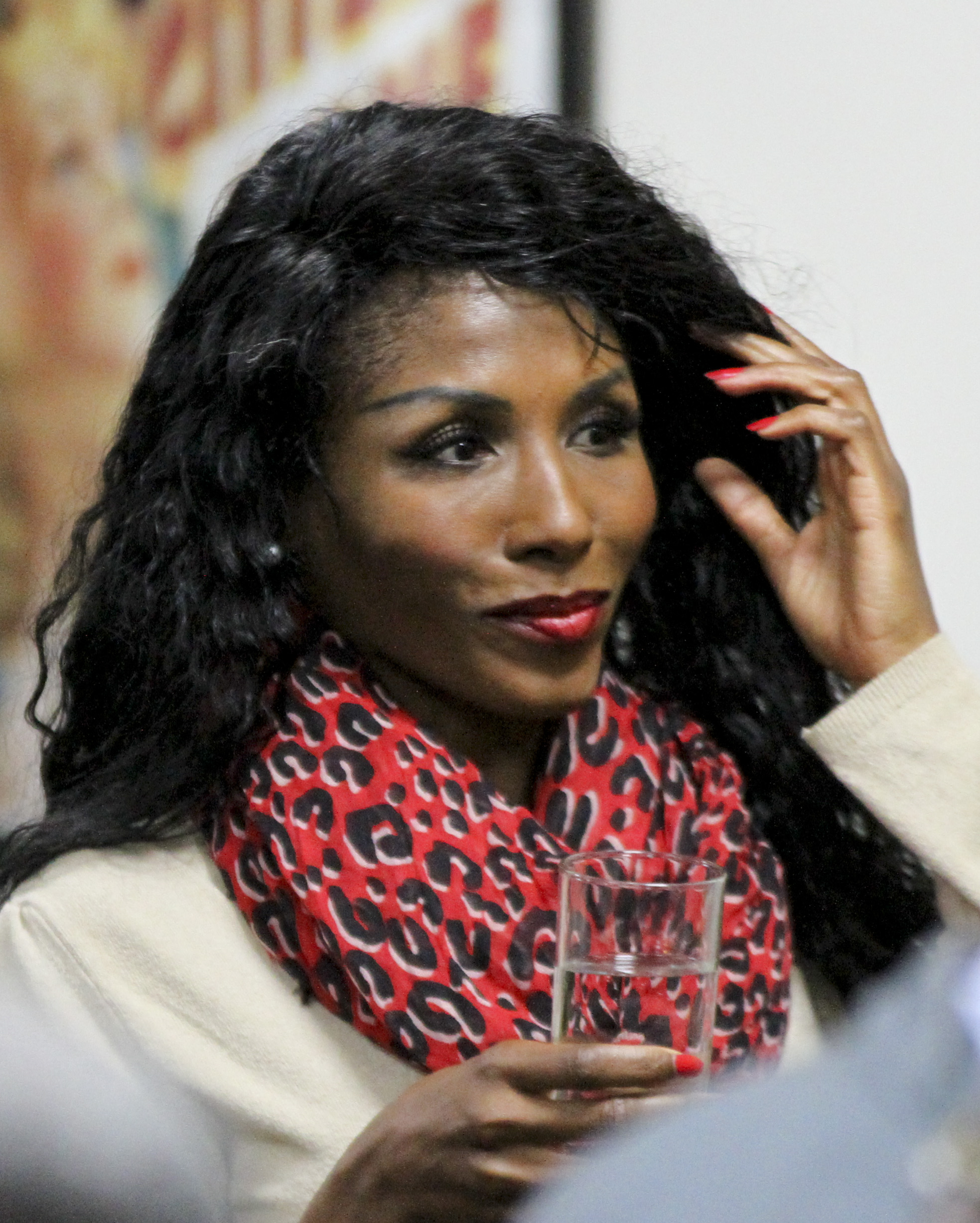
From left to right: Adam Thomas, Ashley Roberts, Beverley Callard, Craig Charles, David Haye, Gemma Collins, Harry Redknapp, Jimmy Bullard, Mo Farah, Scarlett Moffatt, Seann Walsh and Sinitta

Celebrity	Known for	Original position	Status
Adam Thomas	Waterloo Road & former Emmerdale actor	Series 16 (3rd)	Winner on 24 April 2026
Mo Farah	Olympic long-distance runner & track athlete	Series 20 (5th)	Runner-up on 24 April 2026
Harry Redknapp	Former football manager	Series 18 (1st)	Third place on 24 April 2026
Craig Charles	Actor, presenter & DJ	Series 14 (11th)	Eliminated 8th on 23 April 2026
Scarlett Moffatt	Television personality & presenter	Series 16 (1st)	Eliminated 7th on 23 April 2026
Sinitta	Singer & television personality	Series 11 (11th)	Eliminated 6th on 22 April 2026
Ashley Roberts	The Pussycat Dolls singer	Series 12 (2nd)	Eliminated 5th on 22 April 2026
Jimmy Bullard	Former Premier League footballer	Series 14 (10th)	Eliminated 4th on 21 April 2026
Beverley Callard	Former Coronation Street actress	Series 20 (9th)	Withdrew on 21 April 2026
Gemma Collins	Media personality & businesswoman	Series 14 (12th)	Eliminated 3rd on 20 April 2026
David Haye	Former professional boxer	Series 12 (3rd)	Eliminated 2nd on 20 April 2026
Seann Walsh	Stand-up comedian	Series 22 (5th)	Eliminated 1st on 16 April 2026

== Results and elimination ==
Colour key
Winner
Runner up
Third place
Fourth place
Eliminated as a result of losing the survival trial
Eliminated as a result of a majority vote
Won the survival trial and was safe
Lost the survival trial but was saved by their campmates
Immune
Withdrew

Daily results per celebrity
Celebrity	Day 9	Day 11	Day 12	Day 13		Day 14	Live Final			Number of trials
Celebrity	Day 9	Day 11	Day 12	Day 13		Day 14	Round 1	Round 2		Number of trials
Adam	Immune	Safe	Safe	Safe	Safe	Safe	1st 51%	Winner; 58%		9
Mo	Safe	Safe	Safe	Safe	Safe	Safe	2nd 32%	Runner-up; 32%		10
Harry	Immune	Safe	Safe	Safe	Safe	Safe	3rd 9%	Third place 10%		7
Craig	Immune	Safe	Safe	Safe	Safe	Safe	4th 8%	Eliminated (Live Final)		9
Scarlett	Safe	Safe	Safe	Safe	Safe	5th	Eliminated (Day 14)			9
Sinitta	Immune	Safe	Safe	Safe	6th	Eliminated (Day 13)				6
Ashley	Safe	Immune	Safe	7th	Eliminated (Day 13)					6
Jimmy	Immune	Safe	8th	Eliminated (Day 12)						2
Beverley	Immune	Safe	9th	Withdrew (Day 12)						4
Gemma	Immune	9th	Eliminated (Day 11)							3
David	Safe	10th	Eliminated (Day 11)							3
Seann	5th	Eliminated (Day 9)								4
Notes	(Note: Following their entrance to camp, Harry and Jimmy were appointed leaders of the Lions and Rhinos team respectively, the camp was split in half and over the following days, the teams competed to win pendants in order to win a banquet and a trip on safari. The Rhinos won and since the Lions lost, team leader Harry had to decide which member of his team would leave camp.)	(Note: Since Ashley won the endurance competition, she was immune from elimination and had to begin a chain of safety, with each campmate saving another from elimination and so on. Ashley saved Scarlett; Scarlett saved Mo; Mo saved Harry; Harry saved Jimmy; Jimmy saved Gemma; Gemma saved Craig; Craig saved Adam; Adam saved Beverley, and Beverley saved Sinitta. As David was not picked, he was eliminated and had to choose another campmate to be eliminated also. He chose Gemma.)	(Note: For this survival trial, campmates were required to compete in pairs. Since Jimmy refused to take part in the trial once it had begun, he and his partner Adam automatically lost and were eliminated, however Adam remained in camp after his fellow campmates were asked to decide whether he should stay, and unanimously decided that he would.)	None	(Note: For this survival trial, campmates were required to compete in pairs. Since Mo completed the previous trial in the fastest time, he picked first and chose Harry. Since Sinitta forfeited the trial, she and Craig automatically lost. As the pair who had progressed the furthest, Adam and Scarlett had to decide which of Craig and Sinitta would be eliminated and ultimately chose Sinitta to leave camp.)	None	(Note: The public were voting for who they wanted to win. The vote was frozen and the celebrity with the fewest votes was eliminated. The vote to win then reopened between the remaining celebrities.)			
Survival trial (competitors)	None		Adam, Ashley, Craig, Harry, Jimmy, Mo, Scarlett, Sinitta	Adam, Ashley, Craig, Harry, Mo, Scarlett, Sinitta	Adam, Craig, Harry, Mo, Scarlett, Sinitta	Adam, Craig, Harry, Mo, Scarlett	None			
Eliminated	Seann; Harry's choice to eliminate	David; Campmates' choice to eliminate	Jimmy; Lost survival trial	Ashley; Lost survival trial	Sinitta; Adam & Scarlett's choice to eliminate	Scarlett; Lost survival to trial	Craig; 8% (out of 4)	Harry; 10% (out of 3)	Mo; 32% (out of 3)	
Eliminated	Seann; Harry's choice to eliminate	Gemma; David's choice to eliminate	Jimmy; Lost survival trial	Ashley; Lost survival trial	Sinitta; Adam & Scarlett's choice to eliminate	Scarlett; Lost survival to trial	Craig; 8% (out of 4)	Adam; 58% to win		

== Trials ==
The contestants take part in daily trials to earn food. These trials aim to test both physical and mental abilities. The winner is usually determined by the number of stars collected during the trial, with each star representing a meal earned by the winning contestant for their fellow campmates.

The contestants decided who would face the trial
The trial was compulsory.

Trial number	Air date	Name of trial	Celebrity participation	Winner/ Win or Loss/ Number of stars	Notes
1	6 April	Tipped over the Edge	Adam; Ashley; Beverley; Mo	Ashley; Mo	(Note: Upon their entrance, Adam and Ashley were told that the glass they selected to drink out of would determine who would get to choose their teammate for the trial. Ashley selected the glass with a star on and ultimately chose Mo, leaving Adam paired with Beverley. After winning the trial, Ashley and Mo had to choose one of the losing team to join them in Main Camp, meaning the other would be sent to Savannah Scrub; they chose to take Beverley to Main Camp, sending Adam to Savannah Scrub. Prior to the second trial, Ashley's team had to decide which of David and Scarlett they wanted to join their team. They chose David. After David had won the trial, Ashley's team had to decide which of Beverley and Scarlett to join them in Main Camp, and whom to send to Savannah Scrub. They chose to take Scarlett to Main Camp, which meant Beverley was sent to Savannah Scrub. Prior to the third trial, Ashley's team had to decide which of Seann and Sinitta they wanted to join their team. They chose Sinitta. After Sinitta had won the trial, Ashley's team had to decide which of Seann and Scarlett would join them in Main Camp, and who would be sent to Savannah Scrub. They stuck with their decision to take Scarlett to Main Camp, sending Seann to Savannah Scrub to live on basic rations, alongside Adam and Beverley.)
2	6 April	The Lodges	David; Scarlett	David	
3	6 April	Level Up	Seann; Sinitta	Sinitta	
4	7/8 April	Gut Instinct	Craig; Gemma	Craig	(Note: Prior to the trial, Main Camp had to decide which of the new arrivals they wanted to join their team. They chose Craig, meaning Gemma joined Savannah Scrub. The winner earned food for their camp that evening.)
5	8/9 April	Venom Verdict	Seann; Sinitta	Sinitta	(Note: Both camps chose one member of the opposing camp to take part in the trial, with Main Camp and Savannah Scrub selecting Seann and Sinitta respectively. The remaining campmates had to answer questions back at their respective camps to determine who would win a point in each round. The winning team received meals for camp that evening.)
6	9 April	Petrifying Plunge	Adam; Beverley; Gemma; Seann	6/10 stars	(Note: After being informed their time in Savannah Scrub was over, only the campmates from that camp took part in this trial, before joining Main Camp.)
7	10 April	Match Me If You Can	Beverley; Mo	5/10 stars	—N/a
7	10 April	Match Me If You Can	Ashley; Scarlett	5/10 stars	—N/a
8	13/14 April	Wicked Watering Hole	Adam; Ashley; Craig; David	Adam; Craig	(Note: Following Harry and Jimmy's arrival in camp, they were appointed leaders of the "Lions" and the "Rhinos" respectively and the campmates were separated into two teams chosen by them. The camp was subsequently split in half, with each team living on their respective side. Harry and Jimmy were not eligible to take part in these trials, and had to decide which two members of their team would compete in the trial to try and win pendants for their team.)
9	14 April	Cut Throat Cliff	Beverley; Mo; Seann; Sinitta	Beverley; Sinitta	(Note: Following Harry and Jimmy's arrival in camp, they were appointed leaders of the "Lions" and the "Rhinos" respectively and the campmates were separated into two teams chosen by them. The camp was subsequently split in half, with each team living on their respective side. Harry and Jimmy were not eligible to take part in these trials, and had to decide which two members of their team would compete in the trial to try and win pendants for their team.)
10	15 April	Creeper Train	Gemma; Scarlett	Scarlett	(Note: Gemma and Scarlett were automatically chosen to compete in this trial, and were accompanied by leaders Jimmy and Harry. They competed in three separate challenges in which they had to collect golden nuggets. Scarlett collected the most resulting in the Lions winning a pendant.)
11	15 April	Beastly Braai	Harry; Jimmy	Jimmy	(Note: As leaders of their respective teams, Harry and Jimmy competed in this trial, with two pendants up for grabs. Jimmy won the trial on a tiebreaker, meaning the Rhinos team won a banquet and a trip on a safari. As Harry lost the trial, he had to decide which of his team would be eliminated from camp.)
12	16 April	Retching Ball	Craig; David	7/11 stars	(Note: Due to Adam smuggling contraband from the Bush Banquet into camp, the celebrities had two stars deducted and only received five meals for camp that evening.)
13	17 April	Termite Terror	Mo	10/11 stars	—N/a
14	20 April	Snakes and Ladders	Ashley; Scarlett	8/9 stars	—N/a
15	23 April	South African Cyclone	Adam; Craig; Harry; Mo; Scarlett	5/5 stars	—N/a
16	24 April	The Viper Pit	Mo	5/5 stars	—N/a
17	24 April	Heads Up	Harry	5/5 stars	—N/a
18	24 April	Face In Your Fears	Craig	5/5 stars	—N/a
19	24 April	Swallow the Odds	Adam	5/5 stars	—N/a

== Survival trials ==
As in the previous series, due to the show being pre-recorded, there was no public voting and the contestants instead take part in survival trials to determine who is eliminated each day. However, in a change to the format for this series, the winner is determined by a public vote rather than a final survival trial.

The contestants decided who would face the trial
The trial was compulsory.
The celebrity lost the survival trial and was eliminated.
The celebrity lost the survival trial and finished in third place.
The celebrity lost the survival trial and finished as the runner-up.

Trial number	Air date	Name of trial	Celebrity participation	Eliminated	Notes
1	21 April	Rancid Run	Adam; Jimmy	Jimmy	(Note: Campmates were required to compete in pairs for this survival trial, with the losing pair being eliminated. They were each required to pick a stone out of a bag. If they chose red, they could choose their partner, if they chose white, they had to wait to be chosen. The pairs were as follows: Adam and Jimmy, Ashley and Scarlett, Harry and Mo, and Craig and Sinitta. As Jimmy refused to compete in the trial once it began, he and Adam automatically lost. However Adam remained in camp after the other campmates were given the option to decide whether he stayed.)
1	21 April	Rancid Run	Ashley; Scarlett	Jimmy	
1	21 April	Rancid Run	Craig; Sinitta	Jimmy	
1	21 April	Rancid Run	Harry; Mo	Jimmy	
2	22 April	Keys to Success	Adam; Ashley; Craig; Harry; Mo; Scarlett; Sinitta	Ashley	—N/a
3	22 April	Dragged Through Hell	Adam; Scarlett	Sinitta	(Note: Campmates were required to compete in pairs for this survival trial. Since Mo completed the previous trial in the fastest time, he picked first and chose Harry. Since Scarlett finished second in the previous trial, she chose next and selected Adam as her partner, leaving Craig and Sinitta paired up. Since Sinitta forfeited the trial, she and Craig automatically lost. As the pair who had progressed the furthest, Adam and Scarlett had to decide which of Craig and Sinitta would be eliminated and ultimately chose Sinitta to leave camp.)
3	22 April	Dragged Through Hell	Craig; Sinitta	Sinitta	
3	22 April	Dragged Through Hell	Harry; Mo	Sinitta	
4	24 April	Keep Your Eye on the Ball	Adam; Craig; Harry; Mo; Scarlett	Scarlett	—N/a

== Star count ==
Celebrity	Number of stars earned	Percentage
Adam Thomas	16/20 stars	80%
Mo Farah	25/31 stars	81%
Harry Redknapp	10/10 stars	100%
Craig Charles	17/21 stars	81%
Scarlett Moffatt	18/24 stars	75%
Sinitta	—N/a	—N/a
Ashley Roberts	13/19 stars	68%
Jimmy Bullard	—N/a	—N/a
Beverley Callard	11/20 stars	55%
Gemma Collins	6/10 stars	60%
David Haye	7/11 stars	64%
Seann Walsh	6/10 stars	60%

== Ratings ==
Official ratings are taken from BARB, using the four-screen dashboard which includes viewers who watched the programme on laptops, smartphones and tablets within 7 days of the original broadcast.

Episode	Air date	Official rating (millions incl. HD & +1)	Weekly rank for all UK TV channels
1	6 April	4.00	9
2	7 April	3.64	16
3	8 April	3.58	17
4	9 April	3.29	28
5	10 April	3.47	19
6	13 April	3.30	22
7	14 April	3.33	21
8	15 April	3.20	26
9	16 April	3.34	20
10	17 April	3.52	14
11	20 April	3.54	13
12	21 April	3.81	10
13	22 April	3.49	16
14	23 April	3.29	21
15	24 April	3.52	15
16	24 April	4.01	6
Series average	2026	3.52	—N/a
