= Jordan Banjo =

British street dancer

- Born: Jordan Mayowa Banjo; 31 December 1992 (age 33); Wickford, Essex, England
- Occupations: Street dancer, television and radio presenter
- Years active: 2009–present
- Spouse: Naomi Courts (m. 2022)
- Children: 3
- Career
- Current group: Diversity
- Dances: Street dance
- Relatives: Ashley Banjo (brother)

Jordan Mayowa Banjo (born 31 December 1992) is an English street dancer, best known as a current member of the dance troupe Diversity, who won the third series of Britain's Got Talent. He and fellow Diversity star Perri Kiely co-hosted the KISS weekday breakfast show from 2020 to 2026. He is the younger brother of fellow Diversity member Ashley Banjo.

== Dancing career ==
=== Before 2007: Swift Moves Juniors ===
Prior to the formation of Diversity in 2007 Jordan was a member of Swift Moves Juniors, along with fellow Diversity members Sam Craske and Warren Russell.

=== 2007–present: Diversity ===
Jordan is currently a member of the dance troupe Diversity, who were formed in 2007 and won the third series of Britain's Got Talent in 2009.

== Television and radio presenting career ==
=== Television work and presenting ===
Jordan, alongside fellow Diversity member Perri Kiely, took on the role of the backstage presenters for the fourth series of Got to Dance in the Spring of 2013.

In Summer 2013, Jordan and Perri hosted their own television show called Jordan and Perri's Ultimate Block Party, which saw them transform a club (Swim Team, Youth Club etc.) into a dance troupe.

It was announced on 17 February 2014 that Jordan and Perri would be the UK hosts for the Nickelodeon Kids' Choice Awards 2014

Jordan and Perri were again announced as UK hosts for the Nickelodeon Kids' Choice Awards for 2015 and 2016

On 10 November 2016, Banjo was confirmed to be taking part in I'm a Celebrity...Get Me Out of Here. Jordan Banjo was the fourth celebrity to leave the jungle on 29 November 2016.

In 2018, Banjo was the backstage digital presenter for Dancing on Ice. The following year, he started co-hosting The Greatest Dancer with Alesha Dixon.

In 2021, Banjo appeared as Viper on The Masked Dancer. He was the first celebrity to be unmasked.

In 2023, he was runner up in I'm a Celebrity... South Africa.

=== Radio work ===
On 3 August 2020, Banjo, and fellow Diversity dancer Perri Kiely, became the new hosts of the KISS Breakfast Show, taking over from Tom Green and Daisy Maskell. Before this, they hosted a weekly Sunday afternoon show.

On 12 December 2025, the duo announced their departure from KISS Breakfast after five years, before presenting their last ever show on 30 January 2026.

== Other ventures ==
=== Boxing ===
On 11 March 2025 it was announced that Banjo would partake in a MF–professional boxing match on Misfits 22 – Blinders & Brawls against Love Island contestant Wil Anderson, scheduled to take place on 12 April at the Vaillant Live in Derby. However, on 4 April Misfits Boxing confirmed that the event had been postponed to 16 May due to a scheduling issue, and the headliner changed from Misfits 22 to Misfits 21. On the night, Banjo defeated Anderson via technical knockout in the final fourth round.

Banjo returned to the ring ten months later on 7 March 2026 to take on graphic designer and former MFB heavyweight champion Tempo Arts on MF Duel 2: Mitchell vs. Rosado once again at the Vaillant Live in Derby. Banjo defeated Arts via technical knockout in the fourth round.

== Filmography ==
Year	Title	Role
2009	Britain's Got Talent	Winner, as part of Diversity
2010	StreetDance 3D	Member of Aaron's Crew
2012–2014	Ashley Banjo's Secret Street Crew	Mentor
2013	Got to Dance	Backstage Co-presenter
2013	Got to Dance: Auditions Uncut	Voiceover
2013	Jordan and Perri's Ultimate Block Party	Co-presenter
2014	Jordan and Perri's Xmas Slime	Himself
2014	Hacker Time	Guest
2014–2018	Nickelodeon Kids' Choice Awards	UK Co-host
2015	Diversity Live	Himself
2016	I'm a Celebrity...Get Me Out of Here!	Participant
2018	Dancing on Ice	Backstage Digital Host
2019–2020	The Greatest Dancer	Co-presenter
2020	The Chase Celebrity Special	Contestant
2020	Catchphrase Celebrity Christmas Special	Contestant
2020	Who Wants to Be a Millionaire? Celebrity Special	Christmas Special, Contestant
2020–2026	KISS Breakfast	Presenter with Perri Kiely; radio
2021	The Masked Dancer	Viper
2021	Eat Well For Less	Co-presenter
2023	I'm a Celebrity... South Africa	Participant

== MF–Professional boxing record ==
2 fights	2 wins	0 losses
By knockout	2	0

No.	Result	Record	Opponent	Type	Round, time	Date	Location	Notes
2	Win	2–0	Tempo Arts	TKO	4 (4) 2:54	7 Mar 2026	Vaillant Live, Derby, England	
1	Win	1–0	Wil Anderson	TKO	4 (4) 2:13	16 May 2025	Vaillant Live, Derby, England	
