= I'm a Celebrity...Get Me Out of Here! (British TV series) series 16 =

I'm a Celebrity...Get Me Out of Here!
- Series 16
- Presented by: Anthony McPartlin; Declan Donnelly
- No. of days: 22
- No. of castaways: 12
- Winner: Scarlett Moffatt
- Runner-up: Joel Dommett
- Companion show: I'm a Celebrity: Extra Camp
- No. of episodes: 21

Release
- Original network: ITV
- Original release: 13 November – 4 December 2016

Series chronology
- ← Previous; Series 15 Next → Series 17

I'm a Celebrity...Get Me Out of Here! returned for its 16th series on 13 November 2016 on ITV. It was the second in a three-year contract, as confirmed by Ant & Dec at the end of the Coming Out show on 9 December 2015.

Following the end of the previous series, the spin-off show, I'm a Celebrity...Get Me Out of Here! NOW! was rebranded I'm a Celebrity: Extra Camp. It was also announced that Laura Whitmore and David Morgan had quit the show and were replaced by Vicky Pattison, Stacey Solomon and Chris Ramsey. Joe Swash remained as part of the spin-off.

Gogglebox star Scarlett Moffatt won the show on 4 December 2016, with stand up comedian Joel Dommett finishing runner up and Emmerdale star Adam Thomas finishing third. This was the first time in the show's history that two women have won consecutive series.

Carol Vorderman and Jordan Banjo would return to the series seven years later to participate in I'm a Celebrity... South Africa alongside other former contestants to try to become the first I'm a Celebrity legend. Both of them reached the top six. Vorderman was eliminated alongside series 4 contestant Paul Burrell, with the pair finishing joint sixth and fifth overall. Banjo would finish as runner-up to series 6 contestant Myleene Klass.

Adam Thomas and Scarlett Moffatt would return to the series 10 years to participate in the second series of I'm a Celebrity... South Africa to try become the 2nd I'm a Celebrity legend. Moffatt would finish in 5th place. Thomas went onto to win becoming the second I'm a Celebrity legend.

== Celebrities ==
The celebrity cast line-up for the sixteenth series was confirmed on 7 November 2016.

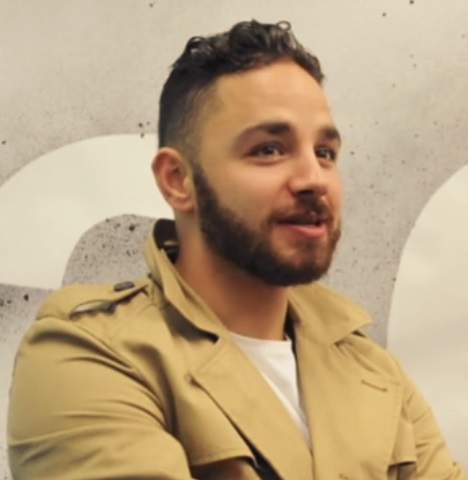
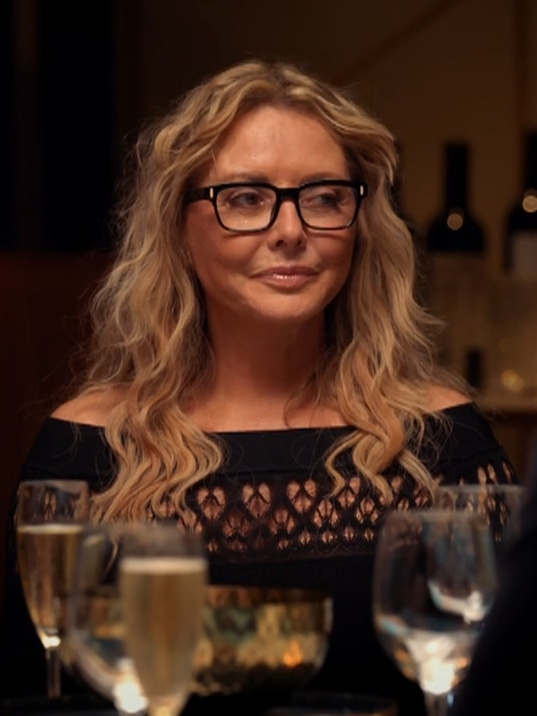
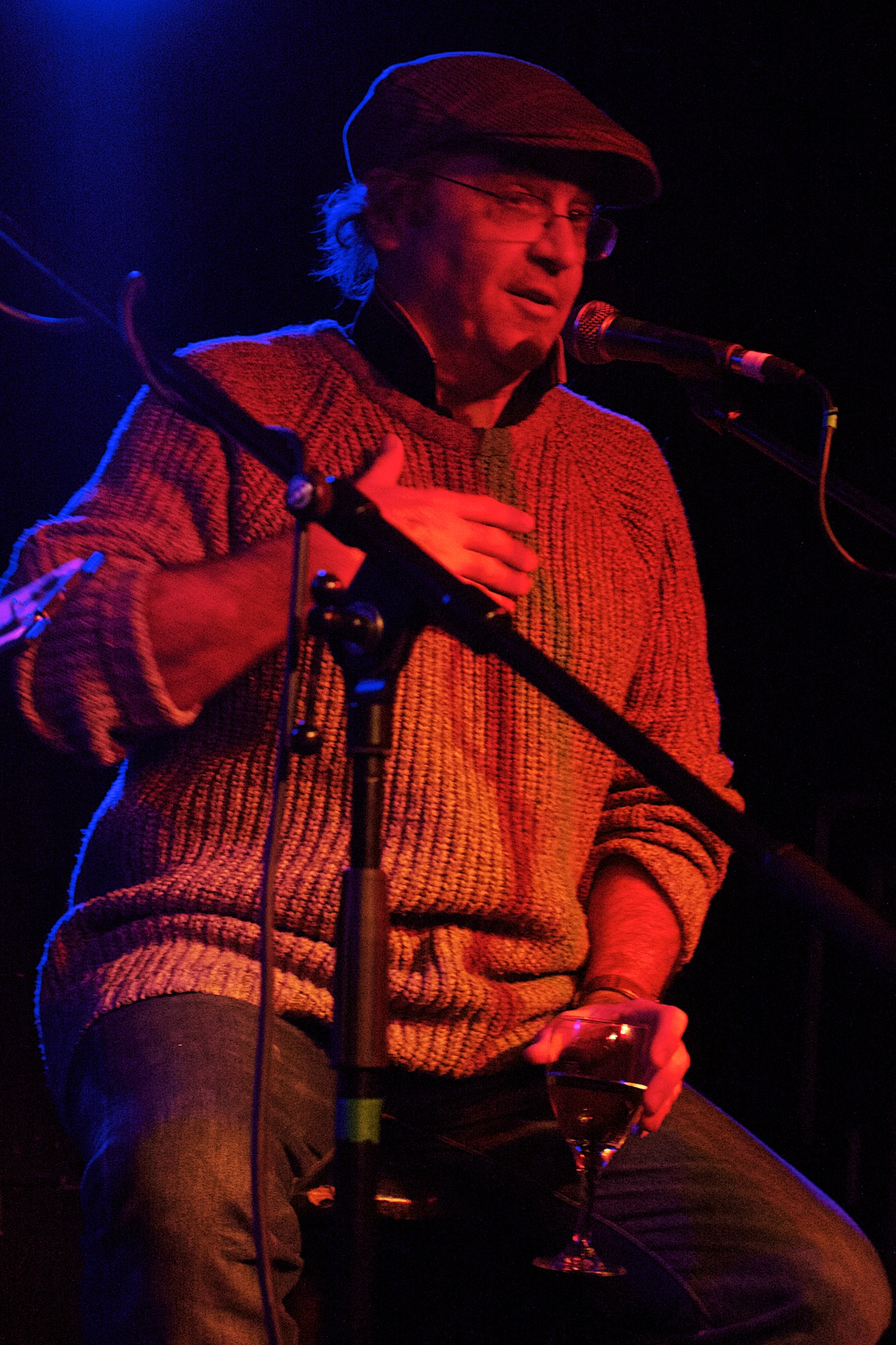
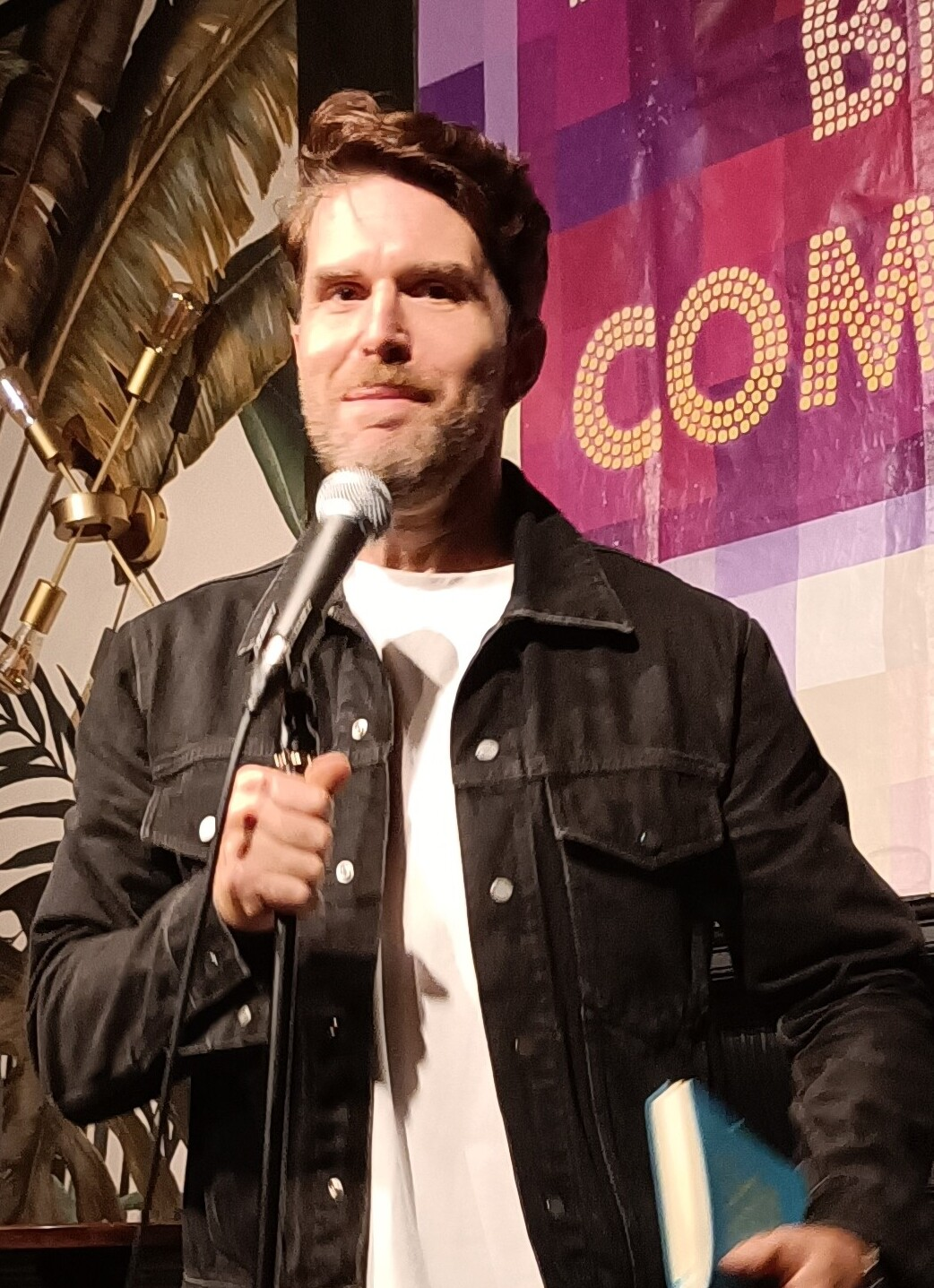
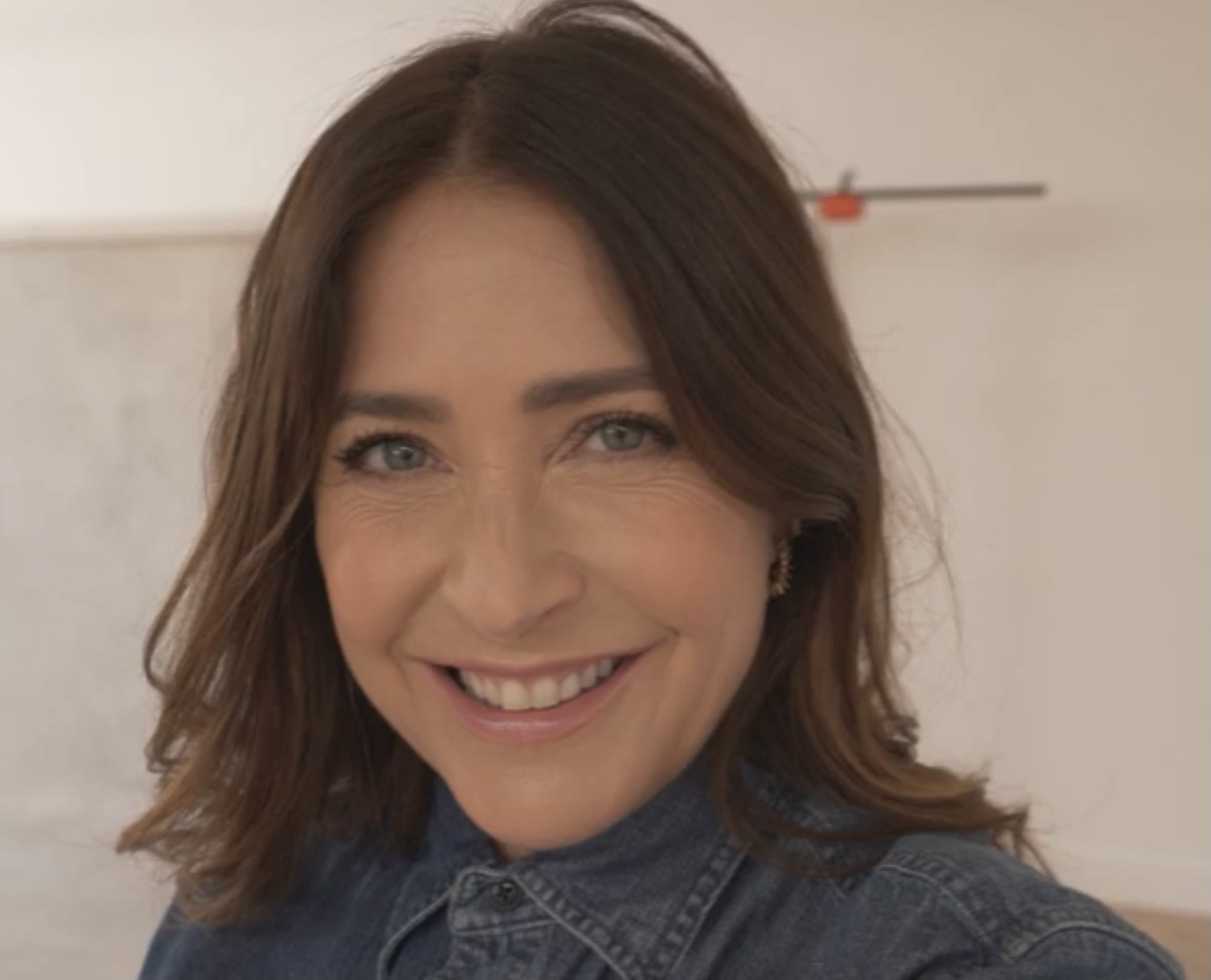
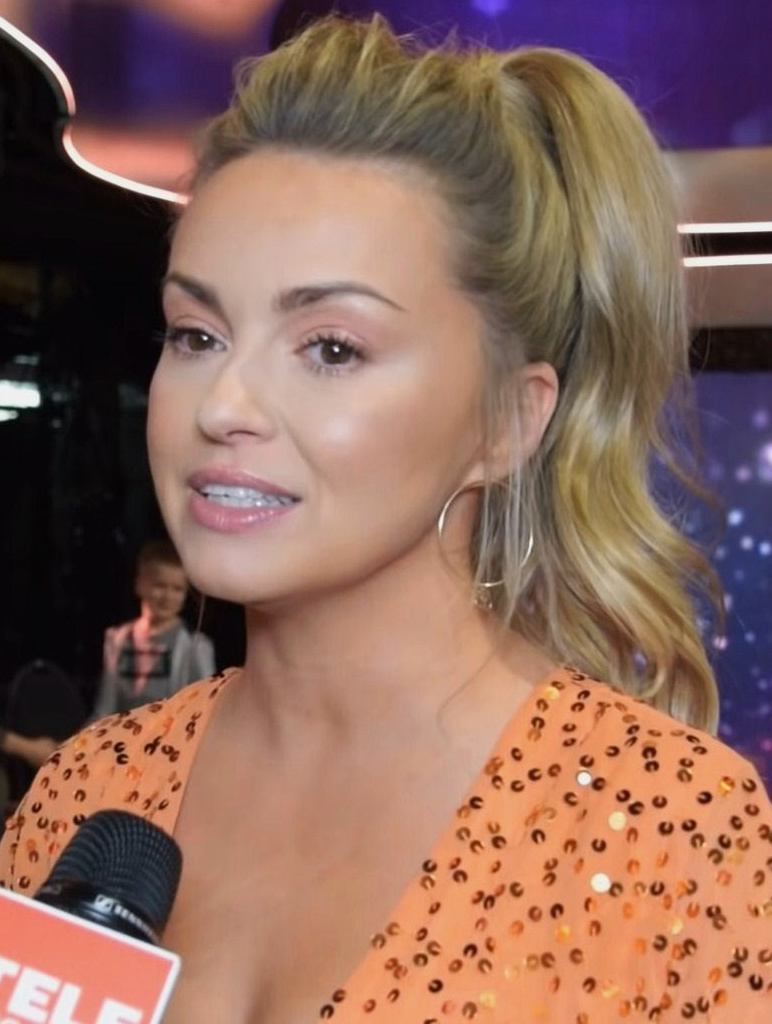
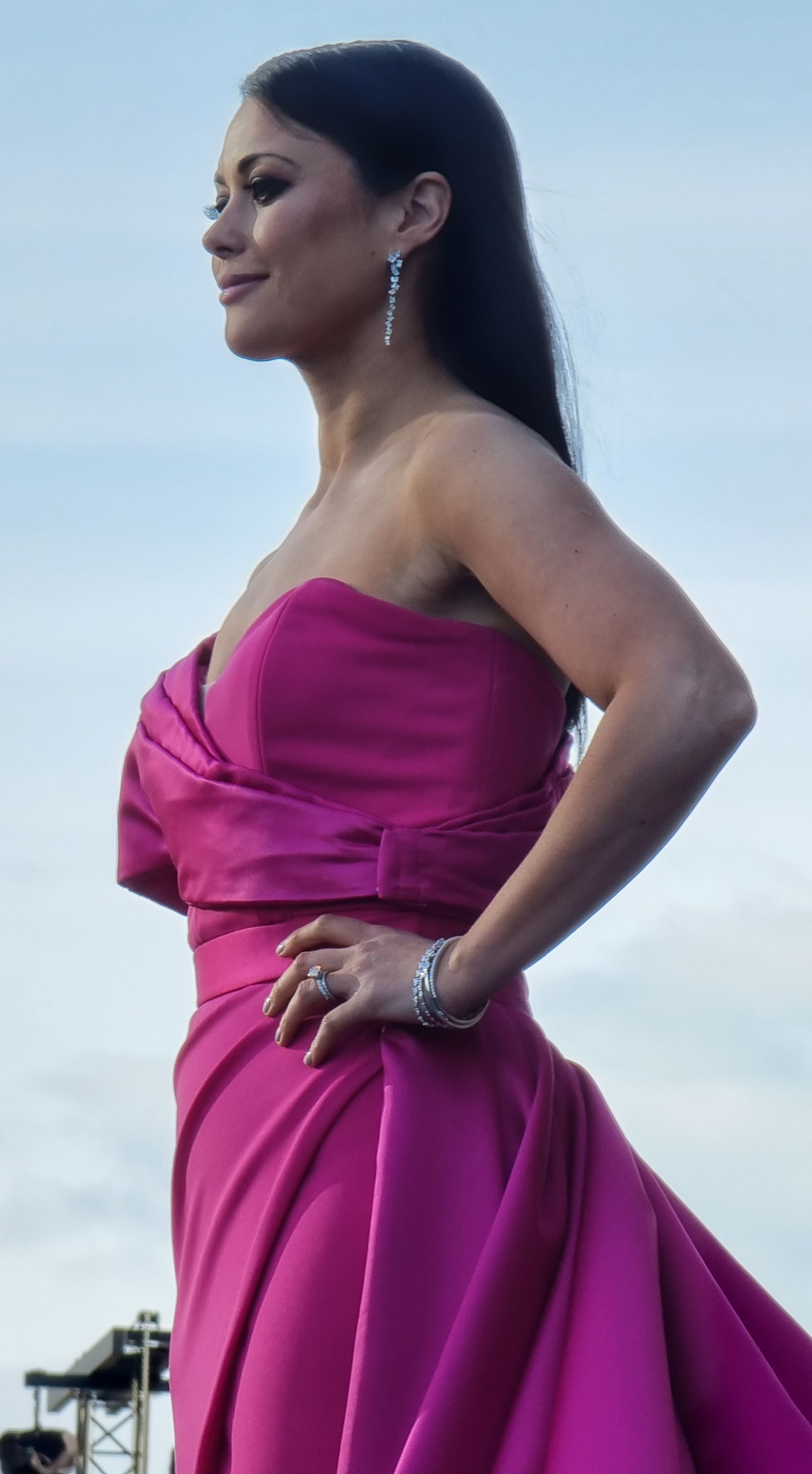
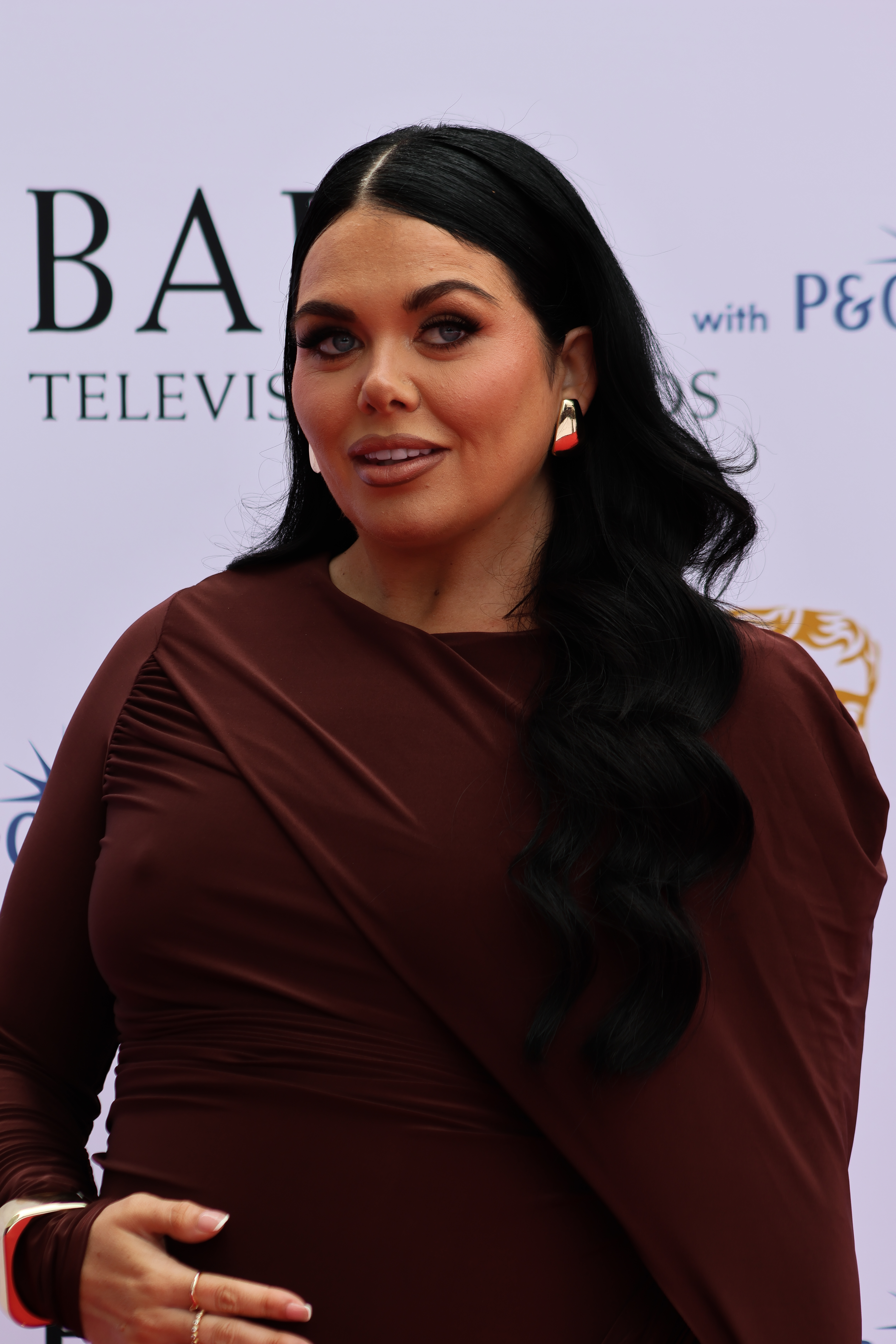
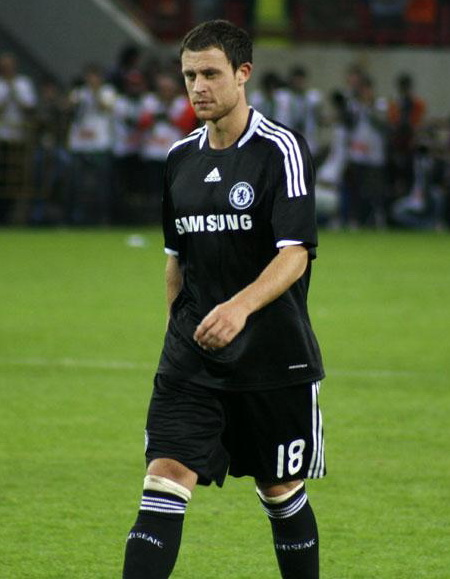
From left to right: Adam Thomas, Carol Vorderman, Danny Baker, Joel Dommett, Lisa Snowdon, Ola Jordan, Sam Quek, Scarlett Moffatt, and Wayne Bridge.
Not pictured: Jordan Banjo, Larry Lamb, and Martin Roberts.

Celebrity	Known for	Status
Scarlett Moffatt	Gogglebox star	Winner on 4 December 2016
Joel Dommett	Stand-up comedian	Runner-up on 4 December 2016
Adam Thomas	Emmerdale actor	Third place on 4 December 2016
Sam Quek	Olympic field hockey player	Eliminated 9th on 3 December 2016
Wayne Bridge	Former England footballer	Eliminated 8th on 2 December 2016
Martin Roberts	Homes Under the Hammer presenter	Eliminated 7th on 2 December 2016
Larry Lamb	Stage & screen actor	Eliminated 6th on 1 December 2016
Carol Vorderman	Former Countdown presenter	Eliminated 5th on 30 November 2016
Jordan Banjo	Diversity dancer	Eliminated 4th on 29 November 2016
Ola Jordan	Former Strictly Come Dancing professional	Eliminated 3rd on 28 November 2016
Lisa Snowdon	Television & radio presenter	Eliminated 2nd on 27 November 2016
Danny Baker	Television & radio presenter	Eliminated 1st on 25 November 2016

== Results and elimination ==
Indicates that the celebrity was immune from the vote
Indicates that the celebrity received the most votes from the public
Indicates that the celebrity received the fewest votes and was eliminated immediately (no bottom two)
Indicates that the celebrity was named as being in the bottom two
Indicates that the celebrity received the second fewest votes and was not named in the bottom two

Daily results per celebrity
	Camp president		Day 13	Day 15	Day 16	Day 17	Day 18	Day 19	Day 20	Day 21	Day 22		Trials	Dingo Dollar challenges
	Day 2	Day 6	Day 13	Day 15	Day 16	Day 17	Day 18	Day 19	Day 20	Day 21	Round 1	Round 2	Trials	Dingo Dollar challenges
Scarlett	2nd 23.68%	1st 27.37%	1st 24.96%	1st 20.90%	1st 22.23%	1st 22.88%	1st 22.58%	1st 26.08%	1st 28.68%	1st 33.46%	1st 39.96%	1st 45.17%	10	1
Joel	5th 8.60%	2nd 18.98%	2nd 20.02%	3rd 16.15%	2nd 18.49%	2nd 18.99%	2nd 20.97%	2nd 21.13%	2nd 22.79%	2nd 29.21%	2nd 31.86%	2nd 38.20%	10	2
Adam	3rd 12.27%	4th 11.56%	Immune	2nd 17.86%	3rd 17.92%	3rd 17.55%	3rd 18.92%	3rd 18.00%	3rd 19.76%	3rd 25.83%	3rd 28.15%	Eliminated (Day 22)	12	3
Sam	9th 3.05%	7th 4.28%	Immune	6th 5.92%	4th 6.77%	4th 8.87%	5th 8.46%	4th 10.68%	4th 10.80%	4th 11.51%	Eliminated (Day 21)		8	2
Wayne	8th 4.29%	11th 3.50%	Immune	7th 5.39%	8th 5.89%	5th 8.57%	4th 9.93%	5th 9.79%	5th 10.53%	Eliminated (Day 20)			6	4
Martin	—N/a	9th 3.75%	4th 11.03%	5th 7.61%	6th 6.19%	8th 5.63%	7th 6.44%	6th 7.52%	6th 7.44%	Eliminated (Day 20)			7	2
Larry	1st 24.75%	—N/a	3rd 14.26%	4th 7.65%	5th 6.59%	6th 6.09%	6th 7.22%	7th 6.80%	Eliminated (Day 19)				5	1
Carol	4th 9.19%	3rd 12.24%	7th 7.91%	10th 4.55%	9th 5.05%	7th 5.87%	8th 5.49%	Eliminated (Day 18)					5	1
Jordan	7th 5.82%	5th 5.73%	5th 8.68%	8th 5.38%	7th 5.97%	9th 5.55%	Eliminated (Day 17)						6	1
Ola	6th 6.04%	10th 3.57%	Immune	9th 4.72%	10th 4.89%	Eliminated (Day 16)							5	2
Lisa	10th 2.30%	8th 4.10%	6th 8.59%	11th 3.86%	Eliminated (Day 15)								5	1
Danny	—N/a	6th 4.93%	8th 4.54%	Eliminated (Day 13)									4	0
Notes	1, 2	1, 3	4	5	None						6			
Bottom two (named in)	None		Carol, Danny	Carol, Lisa	Ola, Wayne	Jordan, Martin	Carol, Martin	Larry, Martin	Martin, Wayne	None				
Eliminated	None		Danny; 4.54% to save	Lisa; 3.86% to save	Ola; 4.89% to save	Jordan; 5.55% to save	Carol; 5.49% to save	Larry; 6.80% to save	Martin; 7.44% to save	Sam; 11.51% to save	Adam; 28.51% to win	Joel; 38.20% to win		
Eliminated	None		Danny; 4.54% to save	Lisa; 3.86% to save	Ola; 4.89% to save	Jordan; 5.55% to save	Carol; 5.49% to save	Larry; 6.80% to save	Wayne; 10.53% to save	Sam; 11.51% to save	Adam; 28.51% to win	Scarlett; 45.17% to win		

=== Notes ===
- ^Note 1: The public were voting for who they wanted to nominate camp president, not for who they wanted to save.
- ^Note 2: Danny and Martin did not enter the jungle until Day 5 and therefore could not be nominated camp president.
- ^Note 3: Larry was exempt from this vote as he had already been nominated camp president by the public.
- ^Note 4: As part of the Claim of Thrones bushtucker trials the winners of this would gain immunity from the first elimination. Adam, Ola, Sam and Wayne became immune by the end of the trials.
- ^Note 5: There was no elimination on Day 14, with the public voting for who they wanted to face the next Bushtucker trial rather than to save.
- ^Note 6: The public voted for who they wanted to win, rather than save.

== Bushtucker trials ==
The contestants take part in daily trials to earn food. These trials aim to test both physical and mental abilities. The winner is usually determined by the number of stars collected during the trial, with each star representing a meal earned by the winning contestant for their camp mates. From 2014, the public voted for who took part in the trials via the I'm a Celebrity... app, from iOS and Android devices.

The public voted for who they wanted to face the trial
The contestants decided who would face the trial
The trial was compulsory and neither the public nor celebrities decided who took part

Trial number	Air date	Name of trial	Celebrity participation	Public vote	Winner/Number of stars	Notes
1	14 November	Tomb of Torment	Jordan; Ola; Sam; Scarlett	—N/a	10/10 stars	1
2	16 November	Big Bush Bake-Off	Carol; Scarlett	13.68% 21.63%	9/10 stars	
3	16 November	Stranded	Adam; Joel; Jordan; Wayne	16.09% 17.25% 13.36% 14.86%	4/10 stars	
4	17 November	The Great Ascent	Joel	20.92%	10/10 stars	2
5	18 November	The Hungry Games: Rank Tanks	Carol; Danny; Martin; Sam	—N/a	Carol; Danny	
6	18 November	The Hungry Games: Catch a Crawling Critter	Adam; Joel; Jordan; Larry; Lisa; Ola; Scarlett; Wayne	—N/a	Adam; Jordan; Ola; Wayne	
7 (Live)	18 November	The Hungry Games: The Final	Adam; Carol; Danny; Joel; Jordan; Larry; Lisa; Martin; Ola; Sam; Scarlett; Wayne	—N/a	Adam; Carol; Danny; Jordan; Ola; Wayne	
8	19 November	Rancid Retreat	Joel; Larry; Lisa; Martin; Sam; Scarlett	—N/a	5/6 stars	
9	20 November	Hell Hollow	Martin	35.58%	8/12 stars	
10	21 November	Bushtucker Food Factory	Adam	28.23%	11/12 stars	
11	22 November	Cage Rage	Adam; Danny	12.58% 19.35%	12/12 stars	3
12	23 November	Claim of Thrones: Vicious Circle	Adam; Carol; Danny; Joel; Jordan; Larry; Lisa; Martin; Ola; Sam; Scarlett; Wayne	—N/a	Adam; Martin; Sam; Wayne	4
13	24 November	Claim of Thrones: The Bush Brewery	Adam; Martin	22.13% 55.93%	Adam; Ola	5
13	24 November	Claim of Thrones: The Bush Brewery	Joel; Ola	—N/a	Adam; Ola	5
14	25 November	Claim of Thrones: Gates to Hell	Adam; Wayne	41.17% 28.02%	Adam; Wayne	6
14	25 November	Claim of Thrones: Gates to Hell	Lisa; Scarlett	—N/a	Adam; Wayne	6
15	26 November	Panic Pipeline	Wayne	—N/a	11/11 stars	
16	27 November	Pick 'n' Critz	Adam; Martin	20.12% 27.61%	11/11 stars	
17	28 November	Hot Sc-Air Ballooning	Carol; Sam	—N/a	10/10 stars	
18	29 November	Hell or High Water	Jordan; Larry	—N/a	9/9 stars	
19	30 November	Wicked Windmill	Joel; Sam	—N/a	3/8 stars	
20	1 December	Critter Console	Scarlett	—N/a	6/7 stars	
21	2 December	Knickerbocker Gory	Adam	—N/a	6/6 stars	
22	3 December	Celebrity Cyclone	Adam; Joel; Sam; Scarlett	—N/a	4/4 stars	
23	4 December	Fill Your Face	Adam	—N/a	5/5 stars	
24	4 December	Bushtucker Bonanza	Joel	—N/a	5/5 stars	
25	4 December	Cavern of Claws	Scarlett	—N/a	5/5 stars	

=== Notes ===
1 The celebrities were divided into two teams; "City Celebs" (Adam, Carol, Joel, Jordan and Ola) and "Jungle Celebs" (Larry, Lisa, Sam, Scarlett and Wayne). The City Celebs picked a Jungle Celeb to help them avoid the bushtucker trial. Carol picked Lisa, Ola picked Sam, Jordan picked Scarlett, Adam picked Larry, and Joel picked Wayne. Each celebrity competed in a task, where the person whose partner lost had to face the first bushtucker trial.
2 Larry and Scarlett were excluded from the trial on medical grounds.
3 Larry, Martin and Scarlett were excluded from the trial on medical grounds.
4 As winners of the first Claim of Thrones trial, Adam, Martin, Sam and Wayne became the first four "Royals", who moved to live in Snake Rock, whereas the remaining celebrities became "Subjects" and continued to live in Croc Creek.
5 The public voted from the four "Royals" (Adam, Martin, Sam and Wayne) to face two "Subjects" who the remaining campmates chose. They chose Joel and Ola.
6 The public voted from the four "Royals" (Adam, Ola, Sam and Wayne) to face two more "Subjects" who the remaining campmates chose. They chose Lisa and Scarlett. As a result of Adam and Wayne being chosen, Ola and Sam became immune from the first elimination.

== Star count ==
Celebrity	Number of stars earned	Percentage
Adam Thomas	53/60 stars	88%
Carol Vorderman	19/20 stars	95%
Danny Baker	12/12 stars	100%
Joel Dommett	31/43 stars	72%
Jordan Banjo	23/29 stars	79%
Larry Lamb	14/15 stars	93%
Lisa Snowdon	5/6 stars	83%
Martin Roberts	24/29 stars	83%
Ola Jordan	10/10 stars	100%
Sam Quek	32/38 stars	84%
Scarlett Moffatt	39/42 stars	93%
Wayne Bridge	15/21 stars	71%

== Dingo Dollar challenges ==
Member(s) from camp will take part in the challenge to win 'Dingo Dollars'. If they win them then they can then take the dollars to the 'Outback Shack', where they can exchange them for camp luxuries with Kiosk Keith. Two options are given and the celebrities can choose which they would like to win. However, to win their luxury, a question is asked to the celebrities still in camp via the telephone box. It is often joked that Ant & Dec make up these questions and their answers. If the question is answered correctly, the celebrities can take the items back to camp. If wrong, they receive nothing and Kiosk Keith will close the shack.

The celebrities got the question correct
The celebrities got the question wrong
No question was asked

Episode	Air date	Celebrities	Prizes available	Prize chosen	Notes
4	17 November	Jordan; Ola	Cheese & crackers Pasty	Cheese & crackers	None
7	20 November	Carol; Joel	Marshmallows; Jelly sweets	Jelly sweets	None
8	21 November	Lisa; Wayne	Cupcakes; Crisps	Cupcakes	None
11	24 November	Adam; Ola; Sam; Wayne	Milk chocolate Pork pies	Milk chocolate	1
13	26 November	Martin; Scarlett	Houmous & breadsticks Bourbon biscuits	Bourbon biscuits	None
16	29 November	Adam; Wayne	Jammie Dodgers; Cherry Bakewells	Cherry Bakewells	None
17	30 November	Larry; Martin	Salted popcorn Chocolate chip scones, jam and cream	Chocolate chip scones, jam and cream	None
18	1 December	Adam; Sam	Corn chips with salsa Jelly	Corn chips with salsa	None
19	2 December	Joel; Wayne	Chocolate Cake; Strawberry Cheesecake	Strawberry Cheesecake	None

=== Notes ===
1 As the reigning royals, Adam, Ola, Sam and Wayne were the only participants in this Dingo Dollar Challenge. After receiving their Dingo Dollars, they didn't have to answer a question as their prize was automatically awarded to them. They did however have the decision to share their prize with the "Subjects"; they accepted this offer.

== Ratings ==
Official ratings are taken from BARB.

Episode	Airdate	Official rating (millions incl. HD & +1)	Rank
1	13 November	12.66	1
2	14 November	11.40	1
3	16 November	10.39	4
4	17 November	10.67	3
5	18 November	9.68	6
6	19 November	10.20	5
7	20 November	10.95	2
8	21 November	10.63	2
9	22 November	10.08	5
10	23 November	10.26	4
11	24 November	10.38	3
12	25 November	10.05	6
13	26 November	9.75	7
14	27 November	10.79	1
15	28 November	10.99	2
16	29 November	9.51	6
17	30 November	9.21	7
18	1 December	9.57	5
19	2 December	9.77	4
20	3 December	9.94	3
21	4 December	11.96	1
Series average	2016	10.42	—N/a
Coming Out	7 December	8.46	2
