= Shona McGarty =

English actress and singer (born 1991)

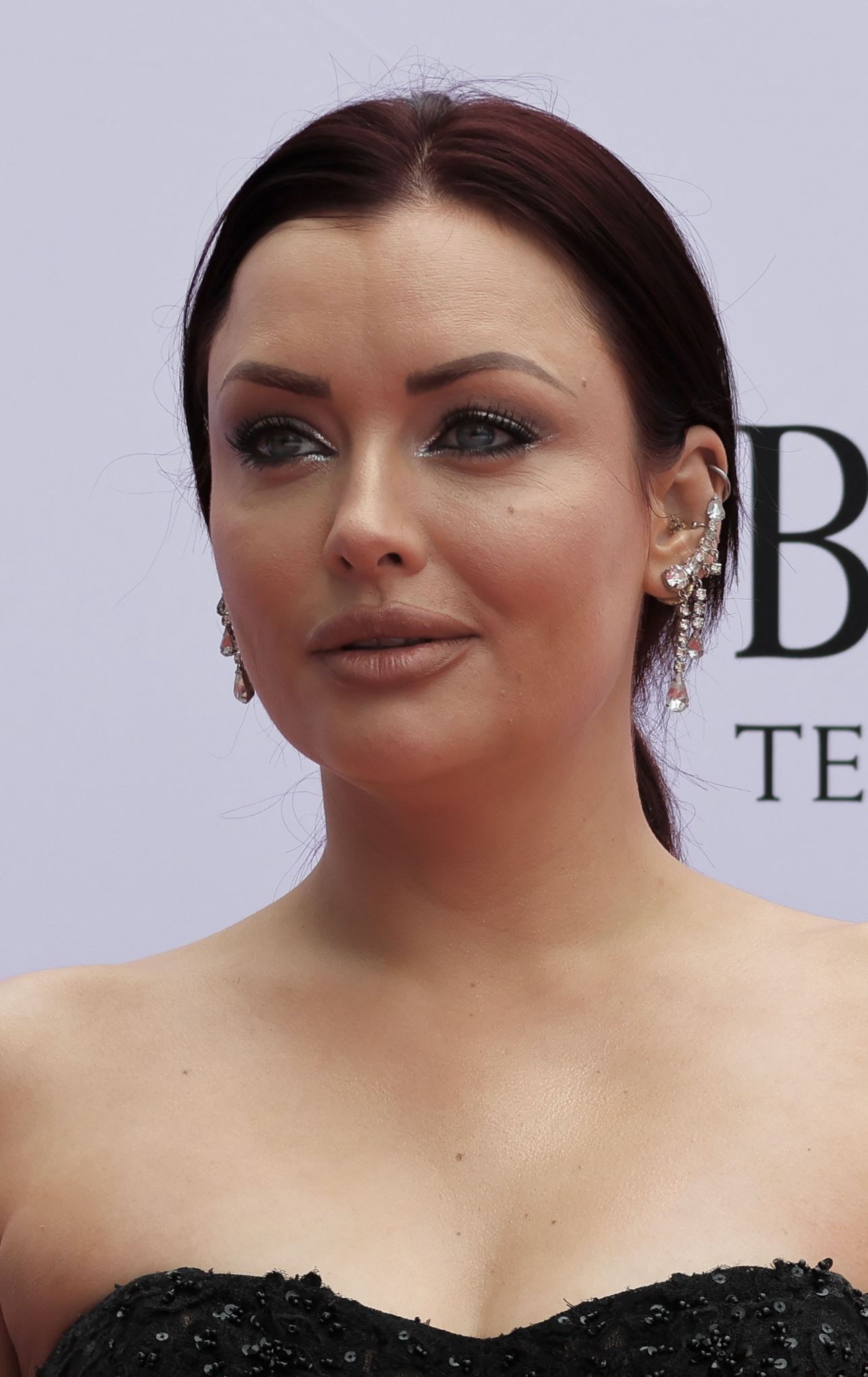
- McGarty in 2026
- Born: Shona Bernadette McGarty; 14 October 1991 (age 35); London Borough of Barnet, England
- Occupations: Actress; singer
- Years active: 2006–present
- Television: EastEnders; I'm a Celebrity...Get Me Out of Here!
- Musical career
- Instrument: Vocals
- Label: Saga Entertainment

Shona Bernadette McGarty (born 14 October 1991) is an English actress and singer, best known for her portrayal of Whitney Dean in the BBC soap opera EastEnders from 2008 to 2026. In 2025, she released a single "Unapologetically Me" and was a finalist on the twenty-fifth series of I'm a Celebrity...Get Me Out of Here!, finishing in third place.

== Early life ==
Shona Bernadette McGarty was born on 14 October 1991 in London Borough of Barnet to Patrick McGarty and Jennifer McNamara. She has a younger sister named Camilla. She is of Irish descent. McGarty attended St. Teresa's Catholic Primary School and later studied at Loreto College, St Albans.

== Career ==
=== Early work and EastEnders ===
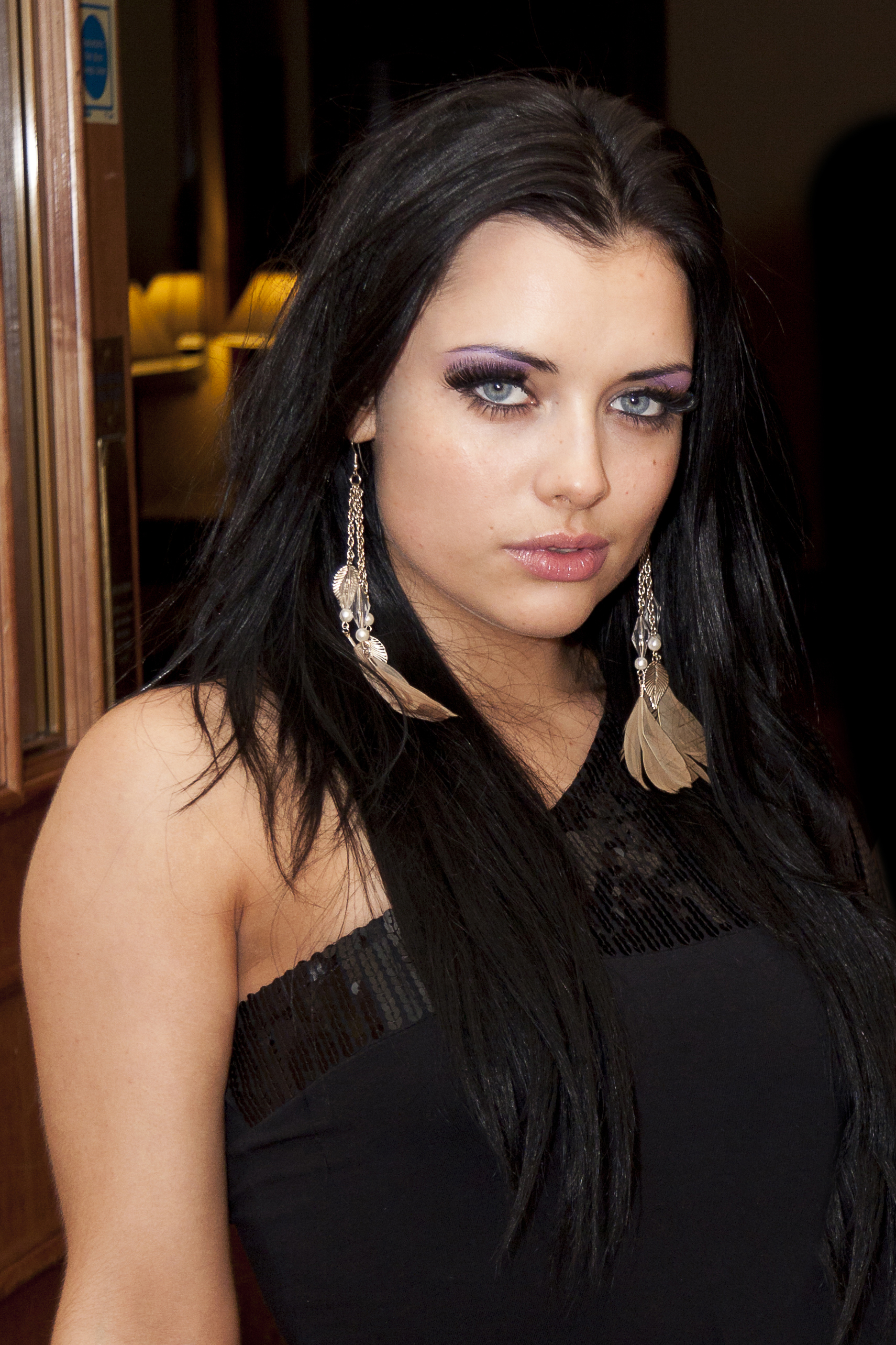
McGarty attending an event in November 2011

McGarty was involved in amateur musical theatre for six years, including a role in Wizard of Oz. In 2007, she appeared in the short film What Goes Around.

In October 2007, following the announcement that established character Bianca Jackson (Patsy Palmer) was returning to EastEnders, McGarty was confirmed to be joining the soap as Whitney Dean; the daughter of Bianca's deceased partner Nathan Dean. McGarty began filming in January 2008, and made her first appearance as Whitney on 1 April. Early into her tenure, the character of Whitney was involved in a sexual abuse storyline in which she was groomed by Bianca's partner Tony King. McGarty who was 16 at the time, required her parents to give permission for the storyline to go ahead. In July 2012, McGarty was suspended from EastEnders by the acting executive producer Lorraine Newman "for repeatedly being late for filming". McGarty later regretted her behaviour as "lazy and irresponsible". The same year, McGarty performed the song A Change is Gonna Come for Children in Need 2012. McGarty's other storylines included being sexually exploited by Rob Grayson (Jody Latham), her marriage to Lee Carter (Danny-Boy Hatchard) and subsequent miscarriage, being stalked by Leo King (Tom Wells) which leads to her killing him in self-defence, and being impregnated by Zack Hudson (James Farrar), before discovering the baby has Edwards syndrome and omphalocele, which ultimately leads to her to terminating the pregnancy. In July 2023, McGarty announced her departure from EastEnders after fifteen years. In an interview with The Sun, McGarty said she "had decided to spread [her] wings and [would] be leaving EastEnders, whilst adding that she had "loved [her] years in the show." Her final scenes aired in May 2024, following the end of her contract. McGarty reprised the role of Whitney for two episodes in May 2026.

=== Music and other ventures ===
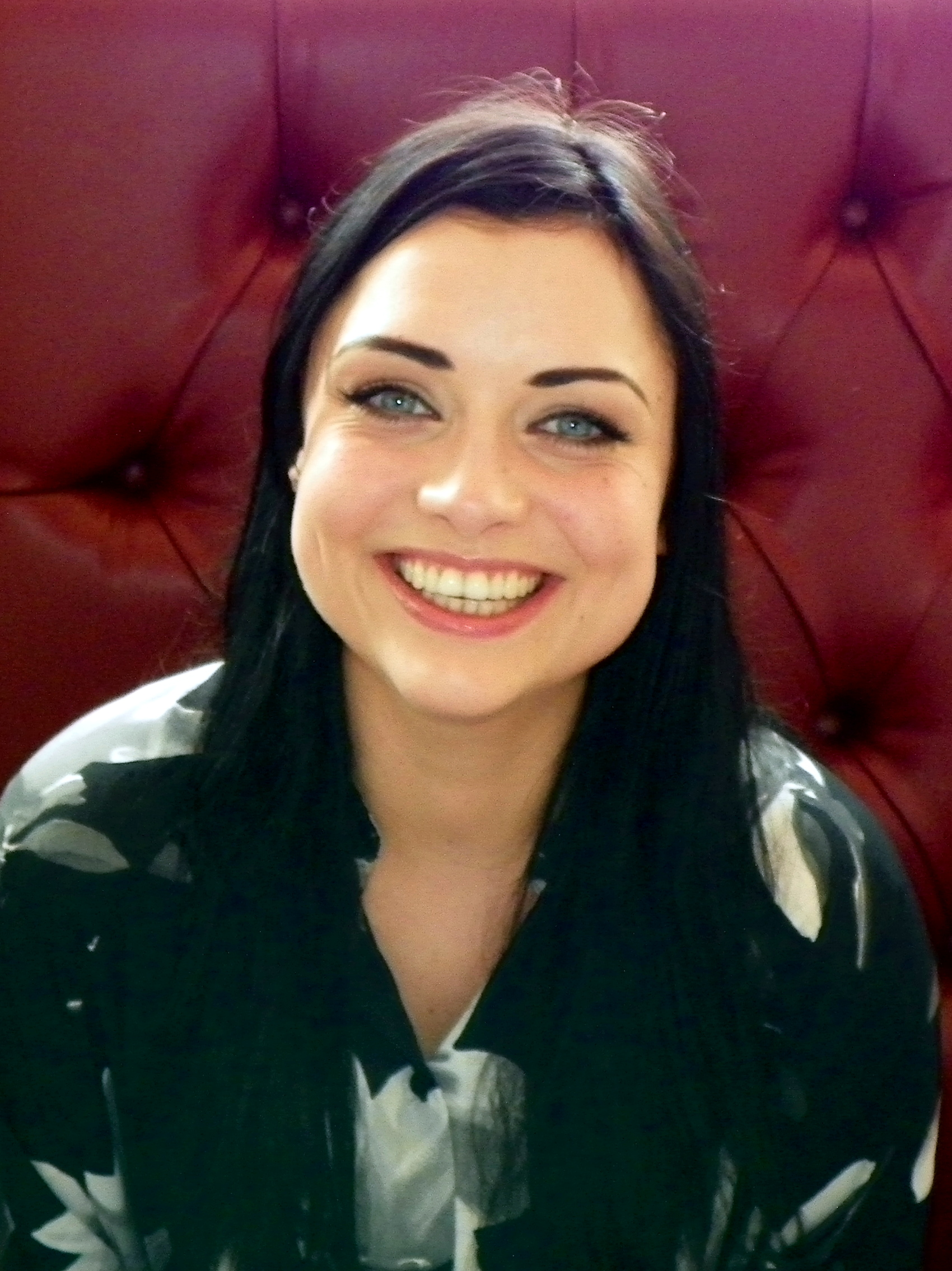
McGarty at an EastEnders Meet and Greet event at BBC Elstree Centre in June 2016

In 2018, McGarty joined 26 other celebrities and performed an original Christmas song, "Rock With Rudolph", a song written and produced by Grahame and Jack Corbyn. The song was recorded in aid of Great Ormond Street Hospital and was released digitally on independent record label Saga Entertainment on 30 November 2018 under the artist name the Celebs. The music video debuted with The Sun on 29 November 2018 and had its first TV showing on Good Morning Britain on 30 November 2018. In 2021, McGarty reunited with Saga Entertainment to record a cover of the Beatles song "Let It Be", recorded at Metropolis Studios, in support of British charity Mind and released on 3 December 2021. McGarty was backed by a choir of celebrities including Georgia Hirst, Anne Hegerty, Ivan Kaye and Eunice Olumide, who performed as part of the 2021 line up of the Celebs. In October 2025, McGarty released a single "Unapologetically Me". The following month, she became a contestant on the twenty-fifth series of I'm a Celebrity...Get Me Out of Here!. On 7 December 2025 she was eliminated from the show, finishing in third place behind runner-up Tom Read Wilson and winner Angryginge.

On 31 December 2025, McGarty performed with Irish singer Ronan Keating on his BBC One New Year's Eve programme, Ronan Keating and Friends: A New Year's Eve Party.

== Personal life ==
McGarty was in a relationship with her EastEnders co-star Matt Lapinskas from 2011 to 2013. Between 2018 and 2020, McGarty was engaged to long-term partner Ryan Harris. In 2022, McGarty dated her EastEnders co-star Max Bowden for six months. She became engaged to musician David Bracken in 2024; however, they split the following year. As of July 2026, she is in a relationship with her former EastEnders co-star, Tony Discipline, who played Whitney's on-screen boyfriend Tyler Moon. McGarty lives in Old Welwyn, Hertfordshire.

== Filmography ==
=== Television ===
Year	Title	Role	Notes	Ref.
2007	What Goes Around	Shona	Short film	
2008–2024, 2026	EastEnders	Whitney Dean	Regular role	
2010	East Street	Whitney Dean	Charity crossover between Coronation Street and EastEnders	
2011	Lauren's Diary	Whitney Dean	2 episodes	
2012	Children in Need 2012	Herself	Performer	
2020	The Queen Vic Quiz Night	Whitney Dean	Charity special	
2020	EastEnders: Secrets from the Square	Herself	Episode: "Whitney and Sonia"	
2025	I'm a Celebrity...Get Me Out of Here!	Herself	Contestant; series 25	
2025	Ronan Keating & Friends: A New Year’s Eve Party	Herself	Performer; guest	

=== Music videos ===
Year	Title	Role	Ref.
2018	Rock With Rudolph	Herself	
2021	Let It Be	Herself	

== Discography ==
=== Singles ===
Year	Title	Ref.
2012	"A Change Is Gonna Come"	
2018	"Rock with Rudolph" (with the Celebs)	
2021	"Let It Be" (featuring the Celebs)	
2025	"Unapologetically Me"	
2026	"Mr Anxiety"	

== Awards and nominations ==
Year	Award	Category	Result	Ref.
2009	British Soap Awards	Best Newcomer	Nominated	
2009	Inside Soap Awards	Best Young Actor	Nominated	
2014	2014 British Soap Awards	Sexiest Female	Nominated	
2014	Inside Soap Awards	Sexiest Female	Nominated	
2015	Inside Soap Awards	Sexiest Female	Nominated	
2016	Inside Soap Awards	Sexiest Female	Nominated	
2017	22nd National Television Awards	Serial Drama Performance	Nominated	
2017	Inside Soap Awards	Best Actress	Nominated	
2017	Inside Soap Awards	Sexiest Female	Nominated	
2018	23rd National Television Awards	Serial Drama Performance	Nominated	
2020	25th National Television Awards	Serial Drama Performance	Nominated	
2020	TV Choice Awards	Best Soap Actress	Nominated	
2020	Inside Soap Awards	Best Actress	Nominated	
2020	I Talk Telly Awards	Best Soap Performance	Nominated	
2021	26th National Television Awards	Serial Drama Performance	Nominated	
2021	Inside Soap Awards	Best Actress	Nominated	
2023	2023 British Soap Awards	Best Leading Performer	Nominated	
2023	Inside Soap Awards	Best Actress	Nominated	
2023	Digital Spy Reader Awards	Best Actor	Fifth	
