= Big Brother 23 =

Big Brother 23 is the twenty-third season of various versions of television show Big Brother and may refer to:

- Big Brother 23, the 2021 edition of the U.S. version
- Big Brother Brasil 23, the 2023 edition of the Brazilian version
- Big Brother 23 (UK), the 2026 edition of the British version
