= Rochelle Rackham =

English television personality (born 1969)

- Born: Rochelle Pearl Shaer; 8 May 1969 (age 57); Brent, London, England
- Occupation: Television personality
- Known for: Big Brother
- Spouse: Russell Rackham (m. 1993)
- Children: 3

Rochelle Pearl Rackham (née Shaer; born 8 May 1969) is an English television personality, known for winning the twenty-third series of Big Brother in 2026.

== Life and career ==
Rochelle Pearl Shaer was born on 8 May 1969 in the London Borough of Brent to Brian and Patricia Shaer (née Talson). She is Jewish. She married Russell Rackham in 1993; they have three sons and reside in Essex. Rackham is into equestrianism, owning a horse named Ruby and has worked as a horseriding instructor as well as competing in show jumping events. She has also worked as a nail technician.

In September 2026, Rackham entered the Big Brother house as a housemate on the twenty-third series. She was nominated for the first eviction alongside Millie Jarrett and Pauline Adeyemo, by "mole" Tays Taylor and his deputy Philip Regan, of which she survived on Day 6, despite expressing her desire to leave the show early on. Rackham was involved in several confrontations with fellow housemate Johanne Cade, whom she ultimately faced eviction alongside and beat on Day 20 of the series. Rackham also clashed with several of her other housemates including Adeyemo and Regan. Rackham survived a further double eviction on Day 48, before ultimately going on to win the series. Rackham received 29 nominations from her fellow housemates during her time in the house, the most of that series and the most of any winner. She is the oldest female winner in the show's history, having been 57 years old at the time of winning. She was deemed a controversial housemate throughout her time in the house, having made comments that were deemed offensive by her fellow housemates and the public, as well becoming known for her meltdowns, including one of which was over the loss of her shoes and another during an altercation with Cade in which she erratically and repeatedly told her to "get the last word". Upon winning, Rackham received boos from the crowd following the announcement, and throughout her interview with hosts AJ Odudu and Will Best.

Rackham subsequently appeared on the Big Brother: The Reunion filmed directly after the final and broadcast the following evening, where it was revealed she won with 37.65% of the vote, 1.03% more than Burnett, making the closest winning margin in the history of the show. Rackham subsequently went on to appear on an episode of Good Morning Britain, where she said she "deserved to win after the mental torture [of the experience] and said she had attempted to walk from the show at least four times. Rackham said she only encountered the application for the show as an accident, having initially wanted to appear on The Traitors.

== Filmography ==
As herself
Year	Title	Role	Ref.
2026	Big Brother	Winner; series 23	
2026	Big Brother: The Reunion	Main cast	
2026	Good Morning Britain	Guest; 1 episode	
