= Big Brother (British TV series) series 23 =

Big Brother
- Series 23
- Series twenty-three eye
- Hosted by: AJ Odudu; Will Best
- No. of days: 54
- No. of housemates: 17
- Winner: Rochelle Rackham
- Runner-up: Lucinda "Twinks" Burnett
- Companion shows: Big Brother: The Group Chat
- No. of episodes: 47

Release
- Original network: ITV2
- Original release: 13 September – 5 November 2026

Series chronology
- ← Previous; Series 22

Big Brother 2026, also known as Big Brother 23, was the twenty-third series of Big Brother. It was the fourth civilian series of Big Brother to air on ITV2 after ITV plc gained the rights to the format, and the sixth series to air on the network overall. The series began on 13 September 2026 and was again co-presented by AJ Odudu and Will Best. At 54 days, it was the longest series to air since the eighteenth series on Channel 5 in 2017, and the longest to air on ITV overall. The companion show Big Brother: Late & Live did not return and was replaced by a vodcast alternative, Big Brother: The Group Chat, accompanying the highlights episodes, hosted by GK Barry and Kate Lawler.

The series concluded on 5 November 2026, when Rochelle Rackham was announced as the winner of the series, with Lucinda "Twinks" Burnett finishing as the runner-up and Yasmin Graham in third place. It was the first series to feature three female housemates in the final three, and at 57 years old, Rackham became the oldest female winner in the show's history. A special one-off reunion episode titled Big Brother: The Reunion, filmed following the events of the final, aired a day later on 6 November, hosted by Odudu and Best from inside the house.

== Format ==
The series retained a similar format to the previous civilian series, however ran for 54 days, following another extension by ITV, making it the longest series to air since the eighteenth series of Big Brother on Channel 5 in 2017, and the longest to air on ITV overall. AJ Odudu and Will Best returned to present the show. ITV said in a statement that the series had been "reimagined as a house of surprises" with "unexpected twists and game-changing moments around every corner", adding "viewers can expect ambitious tasks, high-stakes nominations and dramatic live evictions as the Housemates face challenges at every turn in their bid to outlast their rivals, be crowned this year’s winner and take home a life-changing cash prize. Who wins? You decide." A "new house, every week" was also teased, with a different theme for each week of the series. It was also confirmed that the public would be returning to the original format of voting to evict, after it had been changed to voting to save for the previous series.

== Housemates ==
Fifteen housemates entered the house on Day 1, during the live launch. A further two housemates entered on Day 20.

Name	Age on entry	Hometown	Day entered	Day exited	Result
Rochelle Rackham	57	Essex	1	54	Winner
Lucinda "Twinks" Burnett	36	East London	20	54	Runner-up
Yasmin Graham	29	Manchester	1	54	3rd place
Samuel Keen	21	Slough	1	54	4th place
Lynx Noumey	24	Wolverhampton (originally from Cameroon)	1	54	5th place
Catrin Richards	23	Aberdare	20	54	6th place
Frankie Carter	23	Eltham	1	52	Evicted
Omar El Mayer	21	London	1	52	Evicted
Rhianna Collins	21	Belgravia (originally from Russia)	1	48	Evicted
Philip Regan	53	Liverpool	1	48	Evicted
Harry Benton-Symonds	30	Croydon	1	41	Evicted
Rob Stirzaker	25	Bideford	1	34	Evicted
Pauline Adeyemo	31	Essex	1	27	Evicted
Johanne Cade	44	Salford (originally from the United States)	1	20	Evicted
Charlotte Nott	18	Cowley	1	14	Walked
Chelsey Ammari	29	Grimsby	1	13	Evicted
Millie Jarrett	19	Paisley	1	6	Evicted

== House guests ==
Ahead of the series, it was revealed that each week would have a different theme. Prior to the beginning of the series, ITV live streamed the "dry run" which featured a group of social media influencers residing in the house for 24 hours. On the day of the launch, it was subsequently revealed that one of them would remain in the house as a "mole", as part of the first week's theme "House of Chaos". This was ultimately Michael "Tays" Taylor, who remained in the house until the first eviction. Following the first eviction on Day 6, Odudu and Best revealed that Jedward would enter the house for "House of Double Trouble". They entered the following day and resided in the house for two days. Following the fourth eviction, Gemma Collins entered the house as part of the "House of Power". She subsequently resided in the house for two days. Following the sixth eviction, it was announced that Tiffany Pollard would be entering the house as part of "House of Horror" week. She entered on Day 45, and resided in the house for two days.

Name	Big Brother history		Day entered	Day exited	Theme
Name	Series	Status	Day entered	Day exited	Theme
Michael "Tays" Taylor	—N/a		1	6	House of Chaos
Jedward	Celebrity Big Brother 8	3rd place	7	9	House of Double Trouble
Jedward	Celebrity Big Brother 19	Runner-up	7	9	House of Double Trouble
Gemma Collins	Celebrity Big Brother 17	Evicted	27	29	House of Power
Tiffany Pollard	Celebrity Big Brother 17	4th place	45	47	House of Horror

== Nominations table ==
	Week 1	Week 2	Week 3	Week 4	Week 5	Week 6		Week 7	Week 8 Final		Nominations received
Main Housemates
Rochelle	Nominated	Pauline, Omar	Johanne, Pauline	Pauline, Samuel	Yasmin, Rob, Twinks	10	Keep; Harry, Twinks	Yasmin, Philip	Winner (Day 54)		29
Twinks	Not in House			Rochelle, Frankie	Rochelle, Philip	5	Keep; Philip, Rochelle	Rochelle, Rhianna	Runner-up (Day 54)		13
Yasmin	Not eligible	Rochelle, Rob	Rochelle, Samuel	Rob, Omar	Samuel, Twinks	7	Swap; Samuel, Harry	Samuel, Rochelle	Third place (Day 54)		5
Samuel	Not eligible	Rhianna, Chelsey	Not eligible	Rochelle, Omar	Yasmin, Omar, Rochelle	3	Swap; Omar, Rhianna	Rhianna, Rochelle	Fourth place (Day 54)		10
Lynx	Not eligible	Harry, Rob	Rochelle, Johanne	Pauline, Rob	Yasmin, Rob, Rochelle	6	Swap; Twinks; Keep; Rochelle	Samuel, Rochelle	Fifth place (Day 54)		4
Catrin	Not in House			Samuel, Pauline	Yasmin, Omar, Rhianna	4	Keep; Omar, Philip	Rochelle, Rhianna	Sixth place (Day 54)		6
Frankie	Not eligible	Rhianna, Pauline	Johanne, Pauline	Philip, Rob	Twinks, Rob	9	Keep; Twinks, Catrin	Rochelle, Philip	Evicted (Day 52)		1
Omar	Not eligible	Rob, Pauline	Not eligible	Rob, Yasmin	Twinks, Rob	8	Swap; Catrin; Keep; Samuel	Rochelle, Samuel	Evicted (Day 52)		12
Rhianna	Not eligible	Rob, Harry	Johanne, Rochelle	Pauline, Rob	Rob, Twinks	11	Keep; Twinks, Catrin	Rochelle, Twinks	Evicted (Day 48)		9
Philip	Rochelle, Millie, Pauline	Pauline, Yasmin	Rochelle, Pauline	Pauline, Rob	Yasmin, Rob, Twinks	1	Catrin, Harry, Samuel, Twinks	Twinks, Catrin	Evicted (Day 48)		8
Harry	Not eligible	Chelsey, Lynx	Rochelle, Philip	Philip, Rochelle	Yasmin, Rhianna, Catrin	2	Swap; Philip, Rochelle	Evicted (Day 41)			5
Rob	Not eligible	Chelsey, Lynx	Yasmin, Omar	Omar, Lynx	Lynx, Rochelle	Evicted (Day 34)					16
Pauline	Nominated	Rhianna, Chelsey	Not eligible	Omar, Rochelle	Evicted (Day 27)						15
Johanne	Not eligible	Chelsey, Omar	Rochelle, Omar	Evicted (Day 20)							4
Charlotte	Not eligible	Rochelle, Pauline	Walked (Day 14)								0
Chelsey	Not eligible	Pauline, Rochelle	Evicted (Day 13)								5
Millie	Nominated	Evicted (Day 6)									1
The "Mole"
Tays	Rochelle, Millie, Pauline	Left (Day 6)									N/A
Notes	1, 2	3	4	5	6	7		none	8		
Against public vote	Millie, Pauline, Rochelle	Chelsey, Pauline	Johanne, Rochelle	Pauline, Rob	Rob, Twinks, Yasmin	Catrin, Harry, Samuel, Twinks		Philip, Rhianna, Rochelle, Samuel, Twinks	Catrin, Frankie, Lynx, Omar, Rochelle, Samuel, Twinks, Yasmin		
Walked	none		Charlotte	none							
Evicted	Millie; Most votes to evict	Chelsey; Most votes to evict	Johanne; Most votes to evict	Pauline; Most votes to evict	Rob; Most votes to evict	Harry; Most votes to evict		Philip; Most votes to evict	Omar; Fewest votes (out of 8)	Lynx; 2.44% (out of 6)	
Evicted	Millie; Most votes to evict	Chelsey; Most votes to evict	Johanne; Most votes to evict	Pauline; Most votes to evict	Rob; Most votes to evict	Harry; Most votes to evict		Philip; Most votes to evict	Frankie; Fewest votes (out of 8)	Samuel; 5.11% (out of 4)	
Evicted	Millie; Most votes to evict	Chelsey; Most votes to evict	Johanne; Most votes to evict	Pauline; Most votes to evict	Rob; Most votes to evict	Harry; Most votes to evict		Philip; Most votes to evict	Catrin; 2.29% (out of 6)	Yasmin; 15.89% (out of 3)	
Evicted	Millie; Most votes to evict	Chelsey; Most votes to evict	Johanne; Most votes to evict	Pauline; Most votes to evict	Rob; Most votes to evict	Harry; Most votes to evict		Rhianna; Most votes to evict	Twinks; 36.62% (out of 2)		
Evicted	Millie; Most votes to evict	Chelsey; Most votes to evict	Johanne; Most votes to evict	Pauline; Most votes to evict	Rob; Most votes to evict	Harry; Most votes to evict		Rhianna; Most votes to evict	Rochelle; 37.65% to win		

=== Notes ===
- ^Note 1: On Day 1, Tays entered the house as Big Brother's "mole". He subsequently had to choose another Housemate to join him. He chose Philip, who became his deputy, and together they had to nominate three Housemates for eviction
- ^Note 2: On Day 2, the "mole" Tays and his deputy Philip nominated Millie, Pauline and Rochelle for eviction, who were subsequently told that if any of them identified either of the "moles", they would have an opportunity to save themselves from eviction. They failed to do so however and remained nominated.
- ^Note 3: On Day 7, Jedward entered the house and had to pair up the Housemates to compete in a series of tasks to win immunity. Johanne and Samuel accrued the most points and therefore won immunity from this week’s eviction.
- ^Note 4: On Day 17, the Housemates were told that they would have to earn the right to nominate. They were separated into three groups determined by choosing a number from a box, and each group had to pick a member of an opposing group to lose their right to nominate. The groups were Johanne, Rochelle, Omar and Rihanna, who chose Pauline to lose her right to nominate. Yasmin, Lynx, Pauline and Frankie chose Samuel not to nominate. Whilst Harry, Philip, Rob and Samuel chose Omar not to nominate.
- ^Note 5: On Day 23, Housemates nominated face-to-face as part of the House of Revelations theme. As new Housemates, Catrin and Twinks were immune from receiving nominations this week however were still required to nominate.
- ^Note 6: On Day 30, after winning the final task, the Blue Team earned the power to give a killer nomination to a player from the opposing team, automatically facing the next eviction. They chose Yasmin.
- ^Note 7: As part of the "House of Time" twist, each Housemate drew a number token to determine the order they would enter the time zone. The Housemate with token number 1, Philip, selected four Housemates to be nominated for eviction. Then, Housemates with tokens 2–11 could enter, in numbered ordered, to either keep nominations the same or swap two Housemates with another pair of their choosing. Housemates could not swap or nominate themselves. The four Housemates that remained nominated after the final player, Rhianna, decided who would face eviction.
- ^Note 8: On Day 48, the voting lines opened for the public to vote for the winner. On Day 52, voting was frozen and later that day, Omar and Frankie were evicted from the house via the backdoor. The vote was then re-open and the voting percentages listed are the finalists' share of the total votes when the lined closed for good; they do not account for intermittent vote freezes during the live final.

== Weekly summary ==
The main events in the Big Brother 23 house are summarised in the table below.

Week 1: House of Chaos	Entrances	On Day 1, Yasmin, Harry, Chelsey, Philip, Lynx, Charlotte, Pauline, Rochelle, Millie, Frankie, Samuel, Rob, Rhianna, Omar and Johanne entered the house. Tays entered as the "mole".
Week 1: House of Chaos	Twists	Ahead of the launch, a social media collective known as "The Bov Boys", along with several other influencers, entered the house 24 hours prior to participate in a "dry run", which is usually conducted with unsuccessful housemates and untelevised. During this time they lived inside the house and took part in a series of tasks. At the end of the "dry run", it was announced that one of them would enter the house as a "mole" for of the first week's theme "House of Chaos". This was ultimately Tays, who entered the house during the launch show on Day 1. Housemates were subsequently informed that one of them was a "mole". Unbeknownst to them, Tays had to choose another housemate to join him as a "mole". He chose Philip, who became his deputy, and they subsequently had to nominate three housemates to face the first eviction.; On Day 2, the "mole" Tays and his deputy Philip nominated Millie, Pauline and Rochelle for eviction, however the nominees were told that if any of them could correctly identify either of the moles, they would receive a lifeline and ultimately be saved from eviction. They each failed to do so and remained up for eviction.
Week 1: House of Chaos	Tasks	On Day 2, the housemates competed in "Getting to Know You" in which they had to decide which housemate a statement was about. They were separated into four teams and, The Green Team; Johanne, Pauline, Rob and Yasmin, The Yellow Team; Charlotte, Harry, Samuel and Tays, The Blue Team; Frankie, Millie, Philip and Rochelle and The Red Team; Chelsey, Lynx, Omar and Rhianna. The latter of which won the game and was awarded with cocktails in the snug.; On Day 4, housemates began their first shopping task, in which the house as transformed into "Dreamland" and the "Nightmare Room". As nominated housemates, Millie, Pauline and Rochelle automatically were given a place in "Dreamland", whilst the remaining housemates entered the "Nightmare Room" which in order to leave, they had to compare various tasks. For the first part of the task, Chelsey and Sam played "Ready, Teddy, Go" in which they were in a room full of teddies and had to find the teddies that had been assigned to a housemate. They had to find at least eight, which they did. As a result, the housemates in "Dreamland" subsequently had to choose two housemates to join them. They chose Frankie and "mole" Tays respectively. For the next part of the task, Big Brother told a story and the housemates had to complete the instruction as told in the story. The housemates in "Dreamland" had to cheer, Rhianna had to squeeze a lemon into the housemate she felt was most bitter, the housemates in the "Nightmare Room" had to bark like dogs, the housemates in "Dreamland" had to squirt whipped cream into each of their mouths, Johanne had to smear cake in the face of the housemate that wound her up the most. At the end of the story, the housemates in "Dreamland" chose another housemate to join them. They chose Philip, who had to write "Loser" on the foreheads of the other housemates in the "Nightmare Room". They were then given the option to bring another housemate in, and chose Harry. For the next part, Big Brother asked two housemates in the "Nightmare Room" to prepare 1000 cheese and grapes on cocktail sticks. This was completed by Lynx and Yasmin, who won a cheeseboard for "Dreamland". The housemates in "Dreamland" were asked to choose two housemates to count sheep, which would appear on screen during the night. They chose Johanne and Omar, who failed to guess the correct amount of sheep. On Day 5, for the final part of the task, Johanne and Yasmin were faced with a series of doors each listing ambition of their fellow housemates, and had to match the housemate to the correct statement. They guessed three of them correctly, however failed this part of the task. Housemates passed 3 out 5 challenges and passed the shopping task, therefore receiving a luxury shopping budget.
Week 1: House of Chaos	Nominations	On Day 2, as part of the "House of Chaos" twist, "mole" Tays and his deputy Philip nominated Millie, Pauline and Rochelle for eviction. The nominees failed to identify the moles, and therefore faced the public vote.
Week 1: House of Chaos	Exits	On Day 6, Millie became the first housemate to be evicted. Tays also left the house after completing his time as the "mole".
Week 2: House of Double Trouble	Entrances	On Day 7, Jedward entered the house as guests as part of the "House of Double Trouble" week.
Week 2: House of Double Trouble	Twists	For this week's theme, housemates were told they would be competing in pairs, and in those pairs would compete in a series of tasks and challenges in order to gain points on the scoreboard. The pair with the most points would win immunity from eviction. The pairs were chosen by Jedward and were as follows. Philip and Charlotte, Chelsey and Frankie, Johanne and Samuel, Omar and Pauline, Lynx and Rhianna, Rob and Rochelle, and Harry and Yasmin.
Week 2: House of Double Trouble	Tasks	On Day 7, housemates took part in "The Line-Up" in which they had to line themselves up from most to least competitive.; On Day 7, in their pairs, housemates competed in "Peas in a Pod", in which they were dressed in pea pod costumes and had to land as many peas on the body of their partner as they could within the time limit. Philip and Charlotte won the challenge and were in first place, Chelsey and Frankie finished second, Johanne and Samuel were third, and Rochelle and Rob were fourth, Lynx and Rhianna, and Harry and Yasmin finished joint fifth, whilst Omar and Pauline finished last.; On Day 8, housemates competed in "Jedward's Jepic Pairs", in which each pair had a screen separating them, and were asked questions relating to their fellow housemates. If their answers matched they gained a point. Harry and Yasmin, Lynx and Rhianna, and Omar and Pauline were the only pairs to get one match. At the end of the game, Charlotte and Philip remained at the top of the leaderboard, followed by Chelsey and Frankie in 2nd, and Johanne and Samuel in 3rd. Meanwhile Rochelle and Rob, Harry and Yasmin, and Lynx and Rhianna were joint fourth, and Pauline and Omar remained last.; On Day 9, housemates competed in their pairs in a game where one member of the pair was blindfolded and had to stamp on their teams coloured cups within a minute, whilst the other member guided them. House guests Jedward were able the give one pair an advantage, which meant they would play last and not at the same time as another pair. Omar and Pauline scored 3 points, Harry and Yasmin and Lynx and Rhianna scored 4 points, Charlotte and Philip scored 5 points, Rochelle and Rob scored 6 points, Chelsey and Frankie scored 8 points. and Johanne and Samuel scored 12 points. At the end of the task, the final leaderboard consisted of Omar and Pauline finishing in last place with 6 points, Harry and Yasmin and Lynx and Rihanna in joint fifth place with 8 points, Rob and Rochelle in fourth with 10 points, Charlotte and Philip in third with 12 points and Chelsey and Frankie in second with 14 points. Johanne and Samuel topped the leaderboard with a grand total of 17 points, and therefore won immunity from eviction.; On Day 10, housemates played a game of truth or dare in which each pair had to select a t-shirt which would read either truth or dare, before ultimately completing it.; On Day 11, housemates began their next shopping task in which the house was transformed into Noah’s Ark. Philip and Charlotte assumed the roles of Noah and his wife who oversaw the task and had to take a register of the of the housemates, which they passed. The other pairs became sets of animals and had to complete various tasks assigned to them which they had to complete when their noise sounded. Lynx and Rhianna became rabbits and had to collect carrots. They managed to get 3 out of 5, therefore failing this part of the task. Johanne and Samuel were lions and had to lie down and sleep, Harry and Yasmin became sharks and had to dive into a ball pit, Omar and Pauline became elephants and had to carry luggage to the ark, all passing their parts in the task. Rob and Rochelle became bugs and were the only ones permitted to cook and clean. As other housemates prepared food, they failed this part of the task. Chelsey and Frankie were crows and had to keep watch for doves throughout the duration of the task, which they passed. On Day 12, housemates subsequently passed the shopping task and therefore received a luxury shopping budget.
Week 2: House of Double Trouble	Nominations	On Day 10, housemates nominated for the first time. Johanne and Samuel were immune as result of finishing top of the leaderboard during the "House of Double Trouble" pairs twist. Chelsey and Pauline received the most nominations, and therefore faced the public vote.
Week 2: House of Double Trouble	Punishments	On Day 9, as a result of Chelsey, Frankie, Omar, Rhianna and Yasmin discussing nominations in separate conversations, they had to clean the entire house.; On Day 11, as a result of Frankie, Pauline, Rochelle discussing nominations in separate conversations, they had to peel numerous bags of carrots.
Week 2: House of Double Trouble	Exits	On Day 9, Jedward left the house following their stint as house guests.; On Day 13, Chelsey became the second housemate to be evicted.
Week 3: House of Nothing	Twists	On Day 17, the housemates were told that they would have to earn the right to nominate. They were separated into four groups determined by choosing a number from a box, and each group had to pick a member of an opposing group to lose their right to nominate. The groups were Johanne, Rochelle, Omar and Rihanna, who chose Pauline to lose her right to nominate. Yasmin, Lynx, Pauline and Frankie chose Samuel not to nominate. Whilst Harry, Philip, Rob and Samuel chose Omar not to nominate.
Week 3: House of Nothing	Tasks	On Day 14, for this week's theme the house was transformed into the "House of Nothing" in which all the furniture, food and appliances were removed, whilst the housemates had to wear grey overhauls. Big Brother called one housemate to the Diary Room, which was ultimately Yasmin who gained back her voice and was given the opportunity award two other housemates their voice back. She chose Charlotte and Frankie. Big Brother then instructed a housemate to open a scroll in the hatch. This was Pauline, who gained her voice back and chose Johanne to get hers back also. The remaining housemates had to complete a silent obstacle course in order to get their voices back. If they failed, they had to go to the back of the queue and try again. Rhianna and Lynx answered Big Brother's call to the Diary Room, where they were given the opportunity to win the contents of the fridge back by naming 30 items that were in it. They were successful in doing so. Housemates were next given the opportunity to win back spoons by each balancing a spoon on their nose. Charlotte, Rhianna, Samuel and Yasmin failed to do so, whilst Johanne and Harry were disqualified. The remaining 7 housemates were successful in doing so and therefore won back 7 spoons.; On Day 15, Harry was called to the Diary Room and was given a laminate by Big Brother. He was told that all housemates had to get into various positions relating to knives, forks and spoons when a noise sounded, and that if they were successful, they would win back the remaining cutlery, as well as crockery and cooking equipment. Housemates were later gathered and told that they had to select two housemates to count the contents of various food jars and if successful they would win back the remaining food from the storeroom. They chose Lynx and Samuel. Housemates were subsequently called to the diary room one by one and told that they would win access to the hot water if they guessed to the nearest hour how long they had used the hot tub for. Pauline subsequently guessed correctly and won back the use of the hot water.; On Day 16, housemates were given the opportunity to win back items of furniture. Frankie, Lynx, Pauline, Omar, Rob and Rochelle had an hour to assemble a dining table, dining chair, a bed and a sofa. They were successful in assembling all but the latter and back the dining table, dining chairs and beds. Later that day, housemates were gathered and asked to send the vainest housemate to the Diary Room. They chose Johanne, who had to compliment herself in the mirror for 2 minutes. Later on, Harry and Philip were given the opportunity to win back housemates clothes, however they could only choose eight housemates. They chose Frankie, Johanne, Pauline, Philip, Rhianna, Rob, Rochelle and Samuel respectively.; On Day 18, Lynx was set a secret mission to win back the clothing of himself and Harry, Omar and Yasmin, the remaining housemates who had not yet received their suitcases back, for which he had to steal pieces of clothing from five housemates who had received their suitcases already. He was successful in doing so. Later on, housemates were given the opportunity to win back their sofa, for which the song "Sit Down" was played and they had so sit on the carpet and stand back up again every time the lyrics "oh sit down" were sung.; On Day 19, housemates began their next shopping task "Million Pound Shop". In a format similar to the game show Million Pound Drop, two housemates; Omar and Pauline were selected to take part. During the task, different food groups found on the shopping list were placed on trap doors and they were asked a series of questions about them. They had to place four food groups on at a time, and could split them as they wished. The correct answer was revealed, any food placed on an incorrect trap door would be dropped and they would lose that food group for the week. The final question determined whether they would receive a luxury or economy shopping budget. They were correct and received a luxury shopping budget for the week.
Week 3: House of Nothing	Nominations	On Day 17, housemates nominated for the second time. Omar, Pauline and Samuel were not able to nominate after being chosen as part of the "House of Nothing" twist. Johanne and Rochelle received the most nominations and therefore faced the public vote.
Week 3: House of Nothing	Exits	On Day 14, Charlotte walked from the house.; On Day 20, Johanne became the third housemate to be evicted.
Week 4: House of Revelations	Entrances	On Day 20, Catrin and Twinks entered the house.
Week 4: House of Revelations	Tasks	On Day 21, as part of the "House of Revelations", new housemates Catrin and Twinks entered "Library of Revelations" in which they had to select various forms of media relating to a housemate or situation, that would subsequently be played into the house.They first selected DVD's in which the clips they selected were played. They then had to choose audio books in which the audio was played. Finally they had to read out quotes from the housemates out of books, without knowing who the quoted housemate was talking about.; On Day 22, housemates competed in a game of Agree or Disagree. Following each statement, housemates had to choose whether they would stand on "strongly agree", "agree", "disagree" or "strongly disagree" and explain their reasons.; On Day 24, Catrin and Twinks re-entered the "Library of Revelations", in which they again had to select various forms of media relating to a housemate or situation, that would subsequently be played into the house. This time however they were given the opportunity to select to other housemates to join them, choosing Lynx and Philip respectively, who joined them in selecting the DVD's, audio books and books relating to housemates' situations, which were subsequently played into the house.; On Day 25, housemates began their next shopping task in which the housemates boarded the "BB Express", a train on a track running throughout the house. They could only travel throughout the house via the train and had to complete a series of tasks. Housemates had to keep their train tickets with them at all times and had to hold them up for inspection by Big Brother when instructed to do so. As new housemates, Catrin and Twinks were given first class Tickets and were able to choose two housemates to become first class also. They chose Yasmin and Pauline respectively. First class ticket housemates had priority, with economy ticket holders having to vacate the train if they wanted to get on. Philip was appointed the track controller and had to adjust the levers to direct housemates to their chosen destination. For the next part of the task, housemates had to use the flag semaphore alphabet to communicate word that completed quotes. Frankie and Samuel were the communicators who had to wave the flags to indicate the letters, whilst Rob and Rochelle were the receivers and had to try and decipher them. For the next part of the task, housemates were given a board with all of the nominations totals, and chose Rhianna and Samuel to place the names of the housemates they thought received which total. For the final part of the task, the trains were delayed and Rob had to run a Rail Replacement Bus service throughout the house, which he succeeded in doing so. Housemates incurred several fails including failing to present their tickets when asked, travelling throughout the house without using the train and being in the first class ticket lounge without being permitted to do so. They therefore failed the shopping task and received an economy budget.; On Day 26, a gossip machine was placed in the snug in which when the green light was on, housemates could share some gossip or a secret by speaking to the machine in exchange for "treat tickets" which they could redeem if Big Brother felt their information was worthy of it.
Week 4: House of Revelations	Nominations	On Day 23, housemates nominated face-to-face. Pauline and Rob received the most nominations and therefore faced the public vote.
Week 4: House of Revelations	Punishments	On Day 23, as a result of discussing nominations and writing messages, Omar and Rochelle were sent to jail in the garden for 1 hour and 48 minutes.
Week 4: House of Revelations	Exits	On Day 27, Pauline became the fourth housemate to be evicted.
Week 5: House of Power	Entrances	On Day 27, Gemma Collins entered the house as a guest as part of the "House of Power" week.
Week 5: House of Power	Tasks	On Day 28, as part of the "House of Power". Gemma was asked to select two team captains and chose Rob and Samuel respectively, who then picked their teams. The Blue Team consisted of Samuel, Catrin, Harry, Lynx, Philip and Rochelle. The Red Team was made up of Rob, Frankie, Omar, Rhianna, Twinks and Yasmin. Only the team in power were able to sit on the sofa, use the kitchen and hair appliances and the hot tub. The team without power had to do all the cleaning and were only permitted to use the shower for two minutes. For the first game, Frankie and Philip had to make a tower out of ten dice. Frankie was first to do so and therefore earned power for the Red Team, who were also permitted to attend Gemma's cocktail party that evening.; On Day 29, Lynx and Twinks were chosen to compete in the next game for the Blue and Red teams respectively, in which they had to build a tower out of 26 beer mats. Since Harry from the Blue Team broke one of the rules the previous day, the Red Team were given a 30 second time advantage. Twinks completed her tower first, and retained power for the Red Team, who were given access to spa treatments in the snug and were able to attend Gemma's pizza party.; On Day 30, the team captains had to choose three members of their team to take on the final power game. Rob chose Omar, Rhianna and Yasmin to represent the Red Team, whilst Samuel chose himself, Catrin, Rochelle to represent the Blue Team. They each had to take turns placing a domino in a line on a beam. Once all 60 dominos were placed, the first team to knock down the run successfully won the opportunity to killer nominate a housemate of the opposing team. Housemates were not permitted to interfere with the other team's dominoes, and if they did so they would be disqualified. Yasmin automatically forfeited the game for The Red Team by knocking over The Blue Team's dominoes. The Blue Team therefore won and subsequently gave X a killer nomination, who automatically faced the public vote. The Blue Team were also awarded a party for that evening.; On Day 32, housemates began their next shopping task, in which the house was transformed into Big Brother’s body. Housemates remained in their teams, with captains Rob and Samuel, becoming Big Brother’s Brain, whilst the remaining housemates became blue and red blood cells, who had to obey commands given by their captain. The team that performed the best would be rewarded with a luxury shopping budget, whilst the losing team will would receive basic rations. Throughout the task, whenever the toilet flush sound was heard, the house would turn either blue or red and the respective team had to head to the garden to relieve Big Brother’s Bladder, with guidance from their team captains. While standing on yellow dots they had to form a chain and use buckets with holes to transfer urine from Big Brother’s Bladder into the toilet. The team that fills the toilet the most would win. For the second part of the task, housemates had to help clear Big Brother's nose. Captains chose three members of their team to go head to head, Frankie went against Philip, Omar versus Lynx and Catrin was against Yasmin. They were each given statement about the human anatomy and had to decide if it was true or false. They would stand under Big Brother's nose and the person stood under incorrect answer would be gunged. For the next part of the task saw Lynx and Rochelle for the Red Team, and Frankie and Twinks for Blue Team visit Big Brother’s Nervous System. The "brains” Rob and Samuel had to list body parts to them, and they would have to connect the wires to the correct body parts. For each one guessed correctly they'd win a point. The Blue Team guessed the most correctly and won this part of the task. On Day 33, for the final part of the shopping task, housemates had take a ride on Big Brother's Mood Swing. Prior to the task, housemates took part in a survey, in which they each assigned characteristics to the housemate they felt most applied to it. After Brother had compiled the results, housemate had to select a random ball, take a seat on the swing and throw it into the net of the housemate they believe received the most votes for that characteristic. Neither team scored any points. At the end of the task, the Blue Team gained the most points and therefore gained a luxury shopping budget, whilst the Red Team had to live on basic rations for the week.
Week 5: House of Power	Nominations	On Day 30, as a result of winning the final power game, the Blue Team had to collectively deliver a killer nomination, choosing one housemate to automatically face eviction. They chose Yasmin.; On Day 31, housemates nominated for the fourth time. Rob and Twinks received the most nominations and therefore faced the public vote, alongside Yasmin who had received a killer nomination from the Blue Team.
Week 5: House of Power	Exits	On Day 29, Gemma left the house following her stint as a house guest.; On Day 34, Rob became the fifth housemate to be evicted.
Week 6: House of Time	Tasks	On Day 35, as part of the "House of Time", Big Brother announced that time would become currency, and they would be competing in tasks to win time which in turn could be used for messages from friends and family. Each housemate began with 30 seconds in their time bank. For the first task, Frankie, Lynx and Rochelle to took part in "The Human Clock". One housemate had to act as the hour hand, one as the minute hand and one as the second hand. Big Brother set a starting position and when a cuckoo clock chimed, they had to move in real time until it chimed again. If their final positions were within ten seconds of the actual elapsed time, they would earn an additional ten seconds for the housemates' time banks. If they failed, five seconds would be deducted from each other's time banks. They got one time right, and a further two wrong, ultimately gaining no time for their time banks.; On Day 36, housemates had to become "Speaking Clocks", in which three telephones were placed throughout the house and at random points throughout the day, Big Brother would call and state a time. Housemates had to collectively keep track of said time, and when a phone rang, the housemate who answered had to state the current time. If they were correct, they would earn ten seconds for each housemates time banks but if they were incorrect, five seconds would be deducted. Housemates got two correct, and three wrong, earning a total of five seconds for each of their clocks.; On Day 36, Big Brother called a housemate to the diary room. Twinks answered and was offered thirty seconds in her time bank in exchange for the hot water being switched off for 24 hours. She declined and Big Brother subsequently called another housemate, which was Rhianna, who ultimately accepted the offer. Big Brother later called another housemate to the diary room, Philip answered and was offered thirty seconds in his time bank in exchange for switching off the hair and beauty appliances for 48 hours. He accepted this offer.; On Day 37, a housemate was called to the diary room. Catrin answered and accepted an offer of thirty seconds in her time bank in exchange for taking away the kettle for 24 hours. Big Brother later called another housemate to the diary room. Twinks answered and was offered thirty seconds in her time bank but had to remove one of the housemates on a luxury shopping budget, and revert them to basic rations. She accepted and chose Rochelle.; On Day 38, Rochelle was offered thirty seconds on her time bank in exchange for handcuffing two housemates together for 24 hours. She accepted and chose Samuel and Twinks.; On Day 38, Catrin and Harry were chosen by housemates to compete in a game in which they had to read a time shown on an analogue clock and recreate it on Big Brother’s digital clock by moving sticks. If they were able to set the clock to the correct time in the set amount of moves, ten seconds would be added to each housemates' time bank. They successfully completed all three correctly, therefore earning 30 seconds for each housemates' time bank.; On Day 39, housemates began their next shopping task in which the house was transformed into a "Time Machine". Housemates were separated into three time periods. Catrin, Omar, Rochelle and Twinks became prehistoric; Frankie, Philip, Rhianna and Sam became ancient Egyptians and Harry, Lynx and Yasmin were sent back to the 80's. The housemates in the 80's had to perform two aerobics moves on dance mats in the living area everytime the song "Physical" was played, which they passed. The ancient Egyptians Frankie, Philip and Sam had to assemble numerous pipes to transport enough water into "Cleopatra" Rhianna's bath to reach the line. They were unable to reach line and failed this part of the task. The prehistoric housemates had to read phrases relating to their time in the house on the back of rocks, and draw them on the wall in chalk. They guessed 3 out of 4 correct and passed this part of the task. The ancient Egyptians had to wrap in toilet roll to mummify him every time the song "Walk Like an Egyptian" was played and they passed this part of the task. For the next part of the task, the 80’s housemates had to wind back giant tapes with pencils to play an 80's track and dance to it, before attempting to identify the title and artist, receiving a point for each. They successfully got enough correct to pass this part of the task. Each housemate was also awarded 1 minute and 30 seconds in their time banks and a party that evening.; On Day 40, housemates entered the "Time Zone", where they had to stand in a large block of ice and remain silent as their friends and family spoke to them until their time banks ran out.
Week 6: House of Time	Nominations	On Day 37, as part of the "House of Time", housemates were each asked to choose a token numbered 1 to 11, which determined the order they entered the "Time Zone", where they had three minutes to make their nominations and decide whether to change the nominations on the podium. The first housemate to enter had to nominate four housemates for eviction and place them on the podiums, with respective housemates that entered nominating two housemates, and were able to swap two nominees from the podiums except for themselves. Philip was first and nominated Catrin, Harry, Samuel and Twinks, Harry was next and swapped Samuel and Twinks for Philip and Rochelle. Samuel entered next and swapped Harry and Catrin for Rhianna and Omar. Catrin and Twinks retained the nominations, Lynx swapped Omar for Twinks. Yasmin swapped Philip and Rochelle for Samuel and Harry. Omar swapped Rhianna for Catrin. Frankie, Rochelle and Rhianna retained the nominations. After each housemate had entered, the final four housemates left up for eviction were Catrin, Harry, Samuel and Twinks.
Week 6: House of Time	Exits	On Day 41, Harry became the sixth housemate to be evicted.
Week 7: House of Horror	Entrances	On Day 45, Tiffany Pollard entered the house as a guest as part of the "House of Horror" week.
Week 7: House of Horror	Tasks	On Day 42, the housemates took part in Big Brother's "family therapy" sessions. They first had to take part in "laughter therapy". They then took part in "compliment therapy", in which they had to choose the housemate they had connected with the least and pay them a compliment. Finally, they had to complete an "honesty therapy" session, in which a housemate had to choose two housemates, one of which had to share their honest opinion on the other. Housemates completed the sessions to Big Brother's satisfaction and were awarded with a takeaway of their choice for that evening.; On Day 43, Yasmin was called to the diary room and was subsequently set a series of secret missions by the "Florence Frightingale" doll. She first had to convince three housemates to go ghost-hunting with her. She successfully convinced Frankie, Rhianna and Twinks. Next she had she to choose one housemate to secretly follow around without being caught. She chose Rihanna. She then had to stare straight into another housemates eyes for as long as possible, and when they acknowledged it, had to give them a smile. She chose Lynx. Finally, she had to convince another housemate to come and look at the mirror in the kitchen, before a doll appeared. She chose Rochelle. As a result of Yasmin completing her missions, the house were awarded with cocktails and sweets.; On Day 44, housemates played a game of truth or dare where they had to pick "trick" for a dare, or "treat" for a truth.; On Day 45, housemates took part in Big Brother's "Jack In A Box Horror Quiz", for which they were divided themselves into three groups, Catrin, Frankie, Lynx and Frankie; Rochelle, Twinks and Samuel; and Omar, Philip and Rhianna. Each group went head-to-head to find jack in the box, and the winning member would receive an invite to a party. Frankie won from his team, with Catrin, Lynx and Yasmin having to crawl to move around the house; Samuel won from his group, with Rochelle and Twinks only able to communicate by screaming, and Philip won from his group, with Omar and Rhianna being made to stand in the corner of the room. Each housemate that answered one of the quiz questions correctly, was with answering the final question of the quiz together. They were faced with three large jack-in-the-boxes in the garden, and if they answered correctly, they were each able to pick another housemate to join them at a party that evening. They guessed the correctly and house guest Tiffany Pollard emerged from the correct box, ultimately choosing Rhianna, Twinks and Yasmin to attend the party.; On Day 46, housemates began their final shopping task "The End of the Fear" in which the house was transformed into a funfair, with housemates playing a series of games in an attempt to win tickets. House guest Tiffany was tasked with giving aura readings to the housemates when a noise sounded into the house. For the first part of the task, Frankie, Lynx and Twinks took part in the "Terrifying Teddy Pit", tearing apart the teddies in search of hidden tickets concealed inside within six minutes. They successfully won 5 tickets. For the next part of the task, housemates took part in bobbing for ducks. Working in pairs, within six minutes, they had to fish out the rubber ducks using only their mouths, in search of finding those with "ticket" written on the bottom, whilst discarded the ones that said "wrong duck". If they picked up a duck that said "swap pairs", another pair had to switch with the current pair playing. The pairs were Omar and Samuel, Frankie and Lynx, Catrin and Twinks, Rhianna and Philip, and Rochelle and Twinks again. They successfully won 5 tickets. On Day 47, for the final part of the task, housemates competed in a game in which they had to take in turns sliding down Big Brother's blood slide in an attempt to knock over as many coffins as possible. At the end of the task, Big Brother revealed housemates had accumulated 21 tickets, therefore passing the required number of 18, and received a luxury shopping budget.
Week 7: House of Horror	Nominations	On Day 44, housemates nominated for the final time. Philip, Rhianna, Rochelle, Samuel and Twinks received the most nominations and therefore faced the public vote.
Week 7: House of Horror	Exits	On Day 47, Tiffany left the house following her time as a house guest.; On Day 48, Philip and Rhianna became the seventh and eighth housemates to be evicted.
Week 8: House of Mystery
Week 8: House of Mystery	Tasks	On Day 49, housemates took part in "Pass The Poison", in which housemates were blindfolded and each assigned a secret number. When their number was called, Big Brother would ask them a question. They subsequently had to place the poison in front of the housemate they thought it applied most to. Once their blindfolds were removed, the housemate in question had to then guess who had placed the poison in front of them. They guessed half correctly, therefore passing the task and were able to choose three of five treats for housemates. They chose Rochelle's UV nail lamp, A takeaway pizza for Catrin, and Arsenal scores for Frankie, declining offers of a drum and bass rave in the diary room for Twinks, and a foot spa for Yasmin.; On Day 50, "Big Brother's Mystery Box" was placed inside the house, and in order to unlock the padlock, housemates were given a series of tasks to complete in pairs which would reveal a number for the padlock. Rochelle and Catrin were given a jar of red and blue buttons, which they had to count and work out the difference, which was the number of housemates who had nominated Rochelle, divided by three. Sam and Yasmin were next, with their number being the accumulation of the number of housemates who had nominated Yasmin, and Sam's nominations, divided by two. To find the number, they had to wash up a series of plates and mugs to find the numbers written on them. Omar and Twinks had to use UV torches to uncover invisible numbers on tags, to determine the number of housemates who had nominated Omar divided by two. Frankie and Lynx had to solve an equation relating to events and objects in the house, which resulted in the number of housemates who had nominated Frankie. Housemates correctly worked out the combination of the padlock and the box was unlocked, with them able to select treats for three housemates. They chose a foot spa for Yasmin, a drum and bass rave for Twinks, and a Lebanese grill meal for Omar, declining ping pong for Sam and dumbbells for Lynx.; On Day 51, housemates were separated into girls and boys as they played "Diary Whom", where distorted audio clips from housemates diary room entries were played into the house, with them having to guess which housemate was speaking, and who they were speaking about, receiving a point for each. The girls team accumulated the most points and ultimately won the remaining two housemates treats, ping pong for Sam and dumbbells for Lynx.; On Day 52, the house was transformed into the 1920's to play "June's Journey Game" with four housemates, Frankie, Omar, Rochelle and Twinks being kidnapped by Big Brother, whilst the remaining housemates Catrin, Lynx, Samuel and Yasmin had to serve as detectives and complete various tasks in order to free them. For the first part of the task, they had to match the description of the suspects to their photos, and place them in their evidence files, which they did successfully. Next, the detectives had relay different items from the suspects photo, which the kidnapped housemates had to find and place on the table. Rochelle was subsequently freed from the room. For the next part of the task, detectives Catrin and Yasmin entered the room where one of them had to run on a giant grammarphone, whilst Big Brother read out clues for items, the faster than ran, the clearer the message would be. The other had take down the notes before they would relay it to the remaining kidnapped housemates. They were correct and Twinks was subsequently released. At the end of the task, Big Brother announced that the remaining kidnapped housemates Omar and Frankie had been evicted respectively.
Week 8: House of Mystery	Exits	On Day 52, Omar and Frankie became the ninth and tenth housemates to be evicted, via the back door.; On Day 54, Catrin and Lynx finished in sixth and fifth place respectively. Samuel finished in fourth place whilst Yasmin finished in third. Rochelle was then announced as the winner, leaving Twinks as the runner-up.

== Production ==
In November 2025, prior to the final of the previous series, it was announced that Big Brother would return on ITV in 2026. In January 2026, ITV confirmed that the spin-off Celebrity Big Brother would not return however, with the show being rested for 2026. ITV Director of Television Kevin Lygo stated "Celebrity Big Brother we're looking at. We're thinking not on the main channel, that's the answer. It's so difficult now to book big celebrities, famous people, which is what we need on the main channel. Whereas you can go more interesting and niche on ITV2, adding "We're in a battle with [production company] Banijay about the price. It does really well for us on ITVX. It's a really important, crucial show. I love it and it does a tremendous job for us so, yes, it's coming back." An ITV spokesperson echoed that both shows were a priority for the broadcaster, stating "We are committed to both Celebrity Big Brother and Big Brother beyond 2025, and scheduling for any new series will be confirmed in due course. [...] "The show remains a priority reality format for us having recently hit 150 million streams on ITVX."

Applications for the series opened on 14 November 2025, the day of the final of the previous series, and remained open until 1 August 2026. The casting team advertised for housemates on social media in a series of videos in which people are seen walking around various locations in the United Kingdom holding business cards with the words "Think you've got what it takes to make a great housemate?", as well as a link to the Big Brother website on it. A series of further videos were uploaded, narrated by Marcus Bentley, which targeted different cities and towns throughout Britain on a map and encouraged them to apply. Other videos were shared further along the audition process, one of which featured words being typed on a computer including "urgent", "meeting room 1", "confidential", "shortlist", "under review" and "top secret", and was narrated by Bentley who stated that the "search for housemates was well underway" and that producers were reviewing applications, with "Don't wait. Apply now" written on the computer. Another video included close ups of cameras and equipment used for the auditions, with Bentley stating that "thousands had already applied" and that if people had "been thinking about [applying], now was the time". Both videos concluded with Bentley reading out the audition website. In August 2026, it was reported that the series was set to feature the return of previous housemates from Celebrity Big Brother, who would enter the house as part of tasks, similar to that of the eighteenth series, as well as Sharon Osbourne's stay as a "celebrity lodger" in the twenty-third celebrity series.

=== Broadcast ===
The series will run for 47 episodes, airing six nights a week from Sunday to Friday, with a 90-minute launch show and finale episode. Following the conclusion of the previous series, it was reported that the programme's spin-off show Big Brother: Late & Live had been axed. ITV subsequently confirmed it to be true, and Late & Live was instead replaced by a vodcast alternative titled Big Brother: The Group Chat, which airs between Sundays and Thursdays, with the exception of the launch, and is hosted by GK Barry and Kate Lawler, the latter of whom won the third series of Big Brother in 2002. The live eviction shows were also extended to accommodate interviews with the evicted housemates. It was also announced that the Big Brother: Live Stream, which aired live feed from inside the house, had been axed for this series. The series began on 13 September 2026.

=== House ===
As in the previous series, the house used was a purpose built set at Titan Studios located within Versa Studios in Acton, London. Photos of the house began emerging in September 2026, with the diary room chair being revealed on 10 September. It is a red chair in the shape of eye with different coloured shades of red balls surrounding an iris in the centre. The following day, host AJ Odudu conducted a tour of the house on This Morning, with ITV subsequently revealing photos of the house on social media. The house maintained a similar structure to the previous series on ITV, but with updated colour schemes. The entrance corridor featured red curtained walls with various different pictures on the wall resembling that of the eye logo, as well as chequered flooring. The living area followed a red colour scheme, with a teal sofa. The kitchen is primarily teal, with a gold surface top on the island in the centre, and black and white chequered flooring. The dining area and entrance to the bedroom followed an orange theme, with the dining table forming the shape of a gold eye template. The bedroom uses an orange and dark blue colour scheme, with the vanity station featuring stool seating with fringe attached, and gold mirrors. The bathroom followed a mainly burgundy and maroon colour scheme, with added orange and red decor, as well as two gold armchairs and a red cushioned seating area near the bath. It has two toilets and two showers, as well as three sinks. The garden follows a mostly red and green theme. It features artificial grass and has a cushioned seating area, as well as a hot tub. The walls contained a green and white leaf pattern, as well as an artificial plant wall outside the snug, and inside the eye at the bottom of the garden which surrounded the two-way mirror, and had green and white striped sun loungers in front of it. The snug also returned, which followed a red theme with two red armchairs, various ornaments and a zebra print rug. The garden also featured a new table and chairs surrounded by artificial plants. The corridor leading to the diary room follows a gold theme, with gold curtains and white lights on the walls that take the shape of windows. It also has various pictures on the walls resembling that of those seen in the eye logo and chequered flooring. Several ornaments are featured around the house, as well as lighting fixtures, some of which are feathered.

=== Eye logo and trailer ===
On 12 August 2026, the ITV social media pages posted a teaser eye depicting an eclipse in the centre ahead of the Solar eclipse of August 12, 2026 with the statement "Big Brother sees everything, but even he won’t stare at the solar eclipse". The official eye logo for the series was revealed the following evening on 13 August, during a teaser following an episode of Coronation Street. It depicts a female eye with a purple iris, and a montage of other human eyes around it. It drew comparisons to that of the first series, and marks the first time a human looking eye has been used since the twenty-first celebrity series. The teaser featured the eye blinking, as well as the other eyes blinking and moving around, whilst narrator Marcus Bentley added "Big Brother is coming soon".

A further trailer began airing later that month, which featured different variations of the eye interchanging. It included one similar to that of the eye logo, another featuring clouds in a hurricane, and one that had a waterfall in a forest, as well of versions of the eye that changed colour and patterns, one of which doubled, another which made the eye into a triangle, one which had yellow rings repeating from within it, a red internal looking eye and an iridescent purple eye. Meanwhile Bentley narrates over the trailer stating "Big Brother is back, but if you think you know the game, think again". Bentley went on to tease "a new house every week" and "fresh chaos daily" stating that "everything can change in the blink of an eye".

=== Dry run and the "Mole" ===
Prior to the beginning of the series, it was announced that for the first time in the show's history, ITV would be live streaming the "dry run", which usually features unsuccessful housemates testing out the house before the series begins. This year however, a group of social media influencers took part in the dry run, which included The Bov Boys - an online collective consisting of Angryginge, Tays, Jakey Davies and Chazza, as well as several other content creators including Adeola Patronne, Mariam Musa, Scouse Mali, Shauna Games and Jack McDermott aka Pieface, the latter of whom appeared as a housemate on the sixteenth series of Big Brother in 2015. It began at 12 pm on the 12 September, and concluded 24 hours later, prior to the launch show that evening. It was subsequently announced that one of them would remain in the house as a "mole", as part of the first week's theme "House of Chaos". This was subsequently Tays, who resided in the house until the first eviction.

== Ratings ==
Official 7-day consolidated ratings in the table below are taken from Thinkbox and include +1, but exclude viewership on devices. Please note that the Friday episode in Week 8 is Big Brother: The Reunion which is included.

	Viewers (millions)							
	Week 1	Week 2	Week 3	Week 4	Week 5	Week 6	Week 7	Week 8
Sunday	0.94	1.05	1.13	1.12	1.10	1.18	1.05	1.16
Monday	1.07	1.09	1.09	1.12	1.10	1.18	1.12	1.11
Tuesday	0.99	1.09	0.96	1.13	1.06	1.20	1.09	1.00
Wednesday	1.12	1.08	1.01	1.12	1.10	1.15	1.19	1.00
Thursday	1.03	1.07	0.96	1.08	1.10	1.10	1.11	1.02
Friday	0.95	1.01	0.95	1.10	1.03	1.02	1.12	0.90
Weekly average	1.02	1.07	1.02	1.11	1.08	1.14	1.11	1.03
Running average	1.02	1.05	1.03	1.05	1.06	1.07	1.08	1.07
Series average	1.07							
blue-coloured boxes denote live shows.

=== The Group Chat ===
	Viewers (millions)							
	Week 1	Week 2	Week 3	Week 4	Week 5	Week 6	Week 7	Week 8
Sunday	—N/a	0.22	0.37	0.35	0.26	0.33	0.27	0.33
Monday	0.23	0.25	0.25	0.25	0.29	0.31	0.25	0.27
Tuesday	0.22	0.30	0.21	0.36	0.28	0.29	0.31	0.25
Wednesday	0.24	0.25	0.26	0.26	0.29	0.27	0.25	0.36
Thursday	0.24	0.24	0.20	0.24	0.22	0.29	0.24	—N/a
Weekly average	0.23	0.25	0.26	0.29	0.27	0.30	0.26	0.30
Running average	0.23	0.24	0.25	0.26	0.26	0.27	0.27	0.36
Series average	0.36							

== Controversy and criticism ==
On Day 36, during episode 32 broadcast on 19 October 2026, an argument between Omar El Mayer and Rhianna Collins saw Omar dismiss Rhianna's feelings, telling her that her feelings were not facts and later asking her to not discuss him with other housemates. El Mayer also instructed her to look at him during their confrontation, prompting viewers to accuse him of displaying controlling and emotionally abusive behaviour.

The episode has received a total of 20,252 complaints to broadcasting regulator Ofcom as of 26 October 2026, making it the 6th most complained about programme of all time. It was also criticised by domestic abuse charities, including Women's Aid, which warned that broadcasting such behaviour risked minimising survivors' experiences and presented abuse as "entertainment".

In response to the controversy, Big Brother producers issued a warning to El Mayer about his language and behaviour to fellow housemates, while ITV stated that all contestants receive respect and inclusion training and had access to dedicated welfare support. Ofcom confirmed it was assessing the complaints but had not yet decided whether to launch a formal investigation.
