= Johanne Cade =

American television personality

- Born: 1981 or 1982 (age 44–45); Los Angeles, California, U.S.
- Other name: Gizzelle Cade
- Occupations: Television personality; social media influencer
- Known for: Big Brother
- Children: 2

Johanne Gizzelle Cade (born 1981 or 1982) is an American television personality and social media influencer, known for appearing as a housemate on the twenty-third series of Big Brother in 2026.

== Life and career ==
Johanne Cade was born in Los Angeles, California, between 1981 and 1982. She subsequently married Steven Bender, and they relocated to Salford, Manchester. Prior to her appearance on television, she worked as a social media influencer and in online marketing under the name Gizzelle Cade. One of Cade's videos in which she criticised Gordon Ramsay's restaurant for allowing in a dog that defecated on the floor, went viral. Other videos that gained attention was her shock at the lack of manned checkouts in the United Kingdom, as well as her disdain for the influx of Oasis merchandise during their reunion tour.

In September 2026, Cade entered the Big Brother house as a housemate on the twenty-third series. During her time in the house, Cade was involved in several confrontations with fellow housemate Rochelle Rackham, whom she ultimately faced eviction alongside and was evicted against on Day 20 of the series. After leaving the house, Cade subsequently went on to appear on an episode of Good Morning Britain and appeared on the Big Brother: The Reunion filmed directly after the final and broadcast the following evening, where she had a further argument with Rackham, who had won the series.

== Filmography ==
As herself
Year	Title	Role	Ref.
2026	Big Brother	Housemate; series 23	
2026	Big Brother: The Group Chat	Guest; 1 episode	
2026	Good Morning Britain	Guest; 1 episode	
2026	Not My Bagg	Guest; 1 episode	
2026	Tea Time with Will Njobvu	Guest; 1 episode	
2026	Spill With Will	Guest; 1 episode	
2026	Big Brother: The Reunion	Main cast	
