= Tom Read Wilson =

English television personality (born 1986)

- Born: Thomas Read Wilson; 12 November 1986 (age 39); Berkshire, England
- Education: Rose Bruford College
- Occupations: Television personality; actor; singer
- Television: The Voice UK; Celebs Go Dating; Celebrity Best Home Cook

Thomas Read Wilson (born 12 November 1986) is an English television presenter, author, actor and singer. He is best known as the client coordinator on the E4 reality television series; Celebs Go Dating. In 2021, he was the runner-up on Celebrity Best Home Cook. In 2025, he was the runner-up on the twenty-fifth series of I'm A Celebrity... Get Me Out of Here!.

== Early life ==
Read Wilson was born in Berkshire, on 12 November 1986. He is the son, grandson and great-grandson of teachers who taught at Bradfield College, where he lived while studying at Pangbourne College. Whilst studying at Rose Bruford College, one of his teachers, who also taught at the Royal Academy of Music, recommended their musical theatre course, which Read Wilson embarked on in 2010.

== Acting career ==
After his departure from the Royal Academy of Music in 2011, Read Wilson began performing in pantomimes including Alice in Wonderland, Sleeping Beauty, and The Cat in the Hat. He also appeared in concert with the Fingask Follies and made his West End debut in 2015, portraying Bill Yorke in the play Sweet Revenge.

In May 2023, it was announced that he would play the role of Squidward in the musical Spongebob SquarePants.

== Television career ==
In February 2016, Read Wilson made his first television appearance when he auditioned for the fifth series of The Voice UK, where he sang "Accentuate The Positive", but failed to receive a turn from any of the coaches.

In August 2016, having been spotted on The Voice, Read Wilson joined the E4 reality television series Celebs Go Dating as a receptionist, greeting the celebrities upon their arrival to the dating agency. In 2018, he was promoted to junior client coordinator for the show's fourth series. He was promoted again to senior client coordinator during the eleventh series in 2022.

In March 2020, he appeared as a contestant on Celebrity Mastermind, which he won after he answered all his specialist subject questions correctly, his subject was the film My Fair Lady, playing for his chosen charity, Albert Kennedy Trust.

In January 2021, he was a contestant on Celebrity Best Home Cook, where he reached the final and finished as the runner-up. In 2022, he appeared on an episode of Mary Berry's Fantastic Feasts.

In 2024, he began presenting Channel 5 series, The Taste Test Restaurant. In December 2025, he presented Channel 5 special, The World's Biggest Christmas Market.

In November 2025, he was a contestant on the twenty-fifth series of I'm A Celebrity... Get Me Out of Here!, where he finished as the runner-up to Angryginge. He entered the series as a late arrival on Day 5, alongside Vogue Williams. During his time on the show he was known for his distinct accent, intellect and large vocabulary. He also formed a close friendship with Ruby Wax.

Read Wilson has made multiple other appearances across television, including appearing as a guest on Big Brother's Bit on the Side and Celebrity Juice in 2017. Britain's Got More Talent, Love Island: Aftersun and Strictly Come Dancing: It Takes Two in 2018. He took part in celebrity specials of game shows; Hey Tracey! and Supermarket Sweep in 2019. In 2022, he appeared on Tipping Point: Lucky Stars, The Wheel and the book club chat show, Between the Covers. In August 2023, he had a guest appearance in the Dictionary Corner on the Channel 4 game show, Countdown.

== Literature ==
In September 2022, Read Wilson released his first publication titled; On the Tip of My Tongue: The Perfect Word for Every Life Moment. He released a second book in October 2022, titled; Every Word Tells A Story. In October 2024, he released his third book titled; Wonderful Words That Tell A Tale.

== Filmography ==
Television
Year	Title	Role	Notes
2015	Jayson Bend: Queen and Country	Alec DeCoque	
2016	The Voice UK series 5	Self; contestant	1 episode
2016–present	Celebs Go Dating	Self; client coordinator	259 episodes
2017	Big Brother's Bit on the Side	Self; guest	1 episode
2017–2022	Celebrity Juice	Self; guest	3 episodes
2018	Britain's Favourite Royal	Self; feature	Documentary
2018	Britain's Got More Talent	Self; guest	1 episode
2018	Love Island: Aftersun	Self; guest	1 episode
2018–2022	CelebAbility	Self; guest	2 episodes
2018	Strictly Come Dancing: It Takes Two	Self; guest	1 episode
2019	Hey Tracey!	Self; contestant	1 episode
2019	Supermarket Sweep	Self; contestant	1 episode
2019–2020	8 Out of 10 Cats	Self; guest	2 episodes
2019–2021	Sunday Brunch	Self; guest	3 episodes
2020	The Food and Drink Awards	Self; presenter	TV special
2020	Sport Relief 2020	Self; guest	TV special
2020	The Sarah O'Connell Show	Self; guest	1 episode
2020	Who Said That?	Self; guest	1 episode
2020	Home Alone with Joel Dommett	Self; guest	1 episode
2020	Comedy Game Night	Self; contestant	1 episode
2020	Celebrity Mastermind	Self; contestant	Winner, 1 episode
2020	The Gays Days	Benji Cavendoll	Short film
2021	Loose Women	Self; guest	1 episode
2021	Celebrity Best Home Cook	Self; contestant	2nd place, 8 episodes
2021	Steph's Packed Lunch	Self; guest	1 episode
2021	Kay Burley	Self; guest	1 episode
2021	Children in Need 2021	Self; guest	TV special
2021–2023	Married at First Sight UK: Afters	Self; guest	3 episodes
2022	The Wheel	Self; contestant	1 episode
2022	Mary Berry's Fantastic Feasts	Self; guest	1 episode
2022	Garraway's Good Stuff	Self; guest	1 episode
2022	Tipping Point: Lucky Stars	Self; contestant	1 episode
2022	The Marvellous Maggie Smith	Self; feature	Documentary
2022	Moneybags	Self; contestant	1 episode
2022	Between the Covers	Self; guest	2 episodes
2023	Laura Whitmore's Breakfast Show	Self; guest	1 episode
2023	Countdown	Self; Dictionary Corner	1 episode
2023	Air Fryers: Christmas Made Easy	Self; presenter	TV special
2024	The Chris McCausland Show	Self; guest	1 episode
2024–2025	The Taste Test Restaurant	Self; presenter	5 episodes
2025	Richard Osman's House of Games	Self; contestant	5 episodes
2025	World's Biggest Christmas Market	Self; presenter	TV special
2025	I'm A Celebrity... Get Me Out of Here! series 25	Self; contestant	2nd place, 18 episodes
2025	I'm a Celebrity: Unpacked	Self; contestant	1 episode
2025	Good Morning Britain	Self; guest	1 episode
2025	This Morning	Self; guest	1 episode

Stage
Year	Title	Role
2015	Sweet Revenge	Bill Yorke
2023	Spongebob SquarePants	Squidward

== Bibliography ==
- On the Tip of My Tongue: The Perfect Word for Every Life Moment. Aurum, 2022. ISBN 978-0-7112-7667-3
- Every Word Tells a Story. (Picture book), 2022. ISBN 978-0-7112-7751-9
- Wonderful Words That Tell a Tale. (Picture book), 2024. ISBN 978-0-7112-9163-8
- Pricklepaper's Letter Magic. words&pictures, 2026. ISBN 978-1-8360-0972-6
