= I'm a Celebrity...Get Me Out of Here! (British TV series) series 25 =

I'm a Celebrity...Get Me Out of Here!
- Series 25
- Presented by: Anthony McPartlin; Declan Donnelly
- No. of days: 22
- No. of castaways: 12
- Winner: Angryginge
- Runner-up: Tom Read Wilson
- Location: Murwillumbah, New South Wales, Australia
- Companion show: I'm a Celebrity: Unpacked
- No. of episodes: 22

Release
- Original network: ITV
- Original release: 16 November – 7 December 2025

Season chronology
- ← Previous; Series 24 Next → Series 26

I'm a Celebrity...Get Me Out of Here! returned for its twenty-fifth series on 16 November 2025 on ITV, and was again filmed in Australia with Ant & Dec returning to present the series. Joel Dommett and Kemi Rodgers returned to front the spin-off show I'm a Celebrity: Unpacked.

The series concluded on 7 December 2025, when Angryginge was declared the winner of the series, and ultimately the new "King of the Jungle", with Tom Read Wilson and Shona McGarty finishing in second and third place respectively.

== Production ==
Following the conclusion of the previous series, ITV confirmed that the show would return for a twenty-fifth series in November 2025. Prior to the beginning of the series, ITV revealed a new logo for the programme, for the first time since the eighth series. It features a change of design, with the text maintaining the same colours, but with all lettering now in capitals and "I'm a Celebrity" written in a thicker font. The lettering is no longer situated amongst the trees in the jungle, but is instead layered on top of the background. Joel Dommett and Kemi Rodgers were announced to be returning to host the spin-off show I'm a Celebrity: Unpacked, whilst Sam Thompson did not return as co-host, however is due to appear as a guest.

The first teaser for the series was unveiled in October 2025, and featured a tarantula crawling along a sideboard in a house that had been decorated for Christmas, with a narrator saying "'Twas the night in October, and all through the house creatures were stirring, and I don't mean a mouse" before the words "'Tis nearly the season" appeared on screen followed by the jungle drums from the theme tune. Other versions of the trailer began airing one of which featured a girl reaching into a stocking hung from the fireplace and pulling out a star covered in gunge, before shaking it with some of the gunge landing on a family photo. A full length trailer was released on 1 November, which featured a family sitting around a table for Christmas dinner, with Ant and Dec serving up dishes similar to that consumed the eating trials, as Ant says "It's that time of year again" to which Dec responds "It comes around so fast, doesn't it?". One family members eats one of the fish eyes before it concludes with the family laughing covered in mealworms and partaking in pulling crackers with gunge inside. Ant remarks "'Tis the season" before Dec interrupts and says "for I'm a Celebrity...Get Me Out of Here" followed by the jungle drums. A further trailer featured Ant & Dec in pyjamas entering the living room as Ant exclaims "He's been, he's been". The camera then shows campmates wrapped in jungle themed wrapping paper as Dec tears one open and says "I've always wanted this one". The start date was confirmed for 16 November 2025.

== Celebrities ==
The official line-up was announced by ITV on 10 November 2025. On 19 November 2025, Tom Read Wilson and Vogue Williams were confirmed as this year's late arrivals.

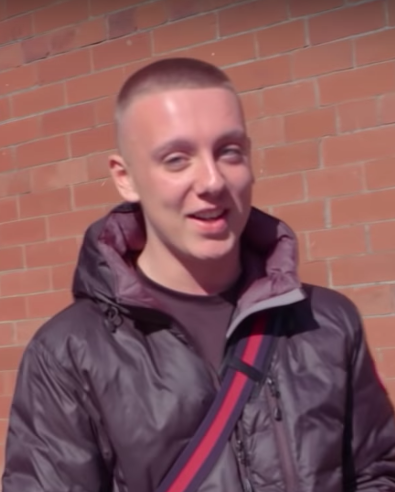
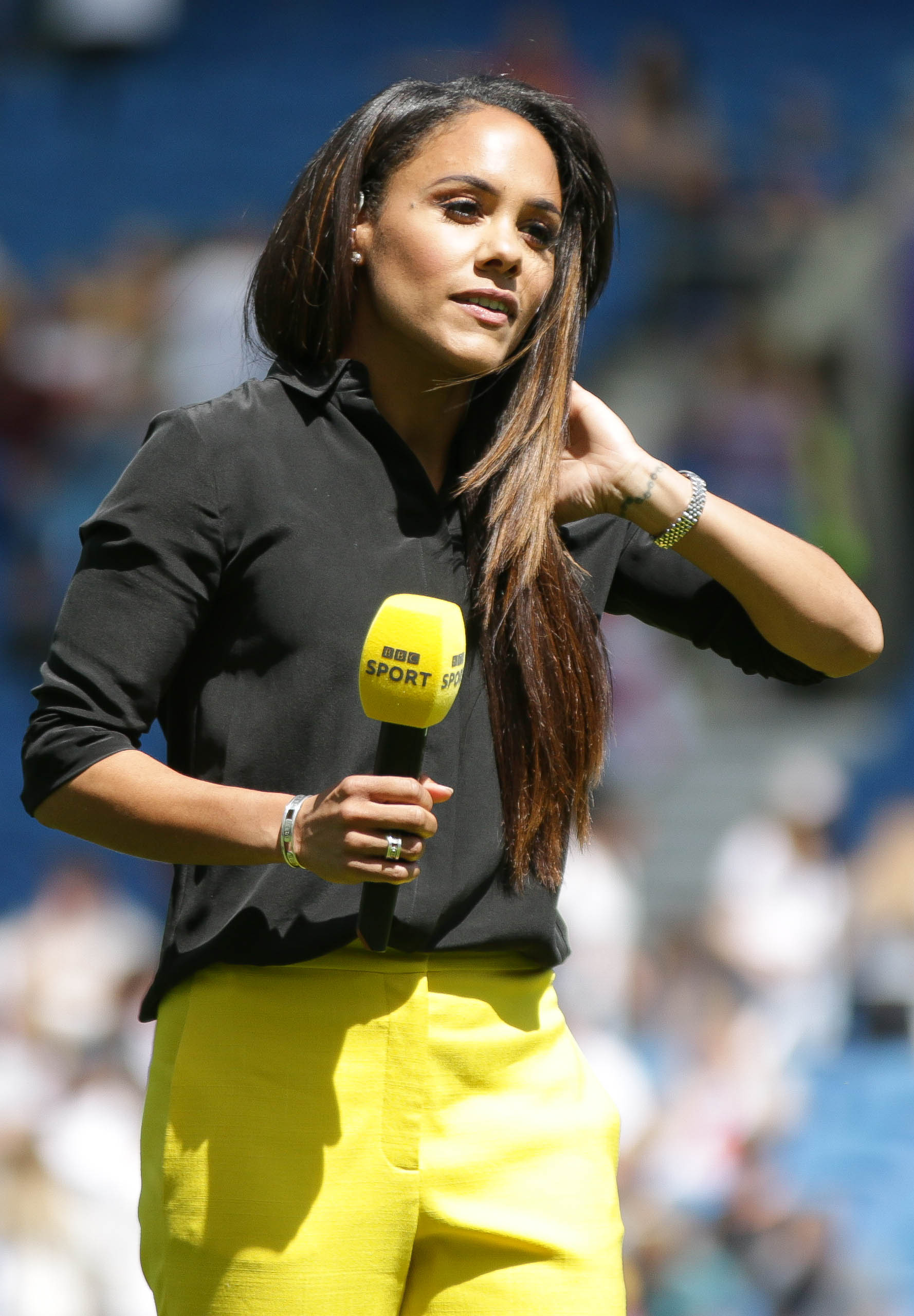
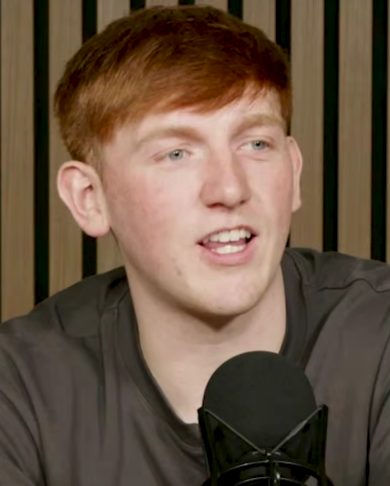
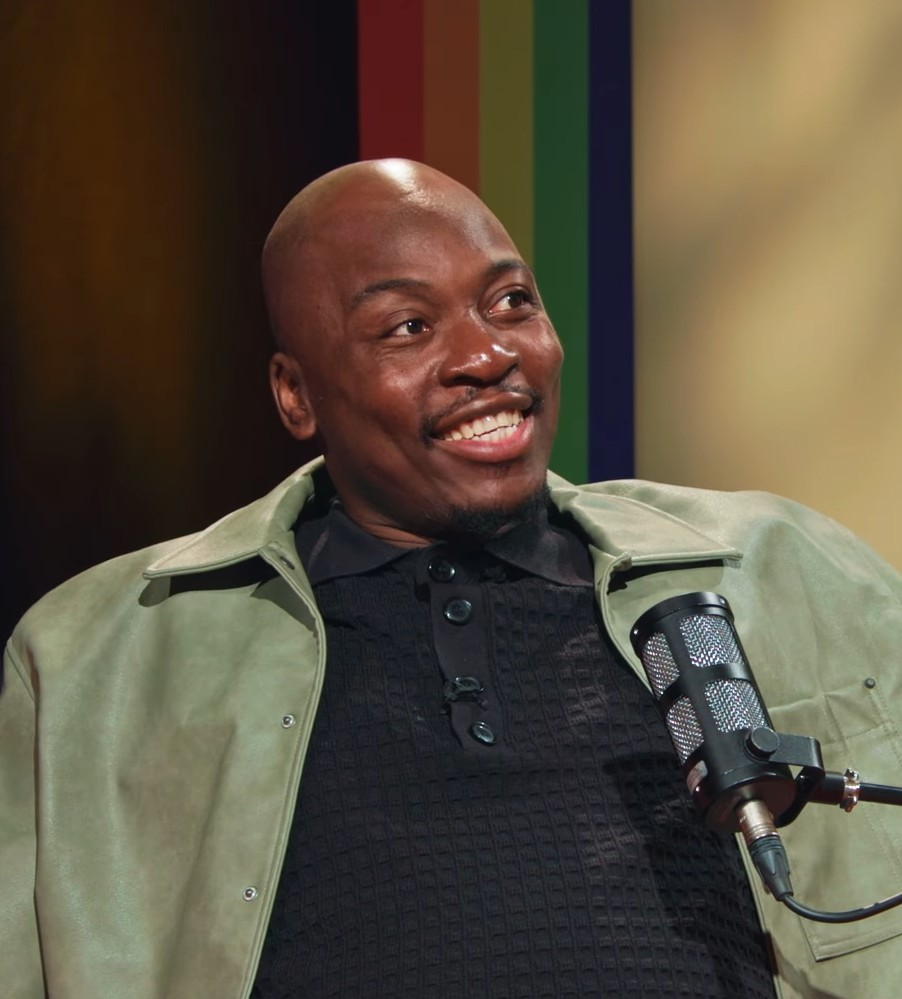
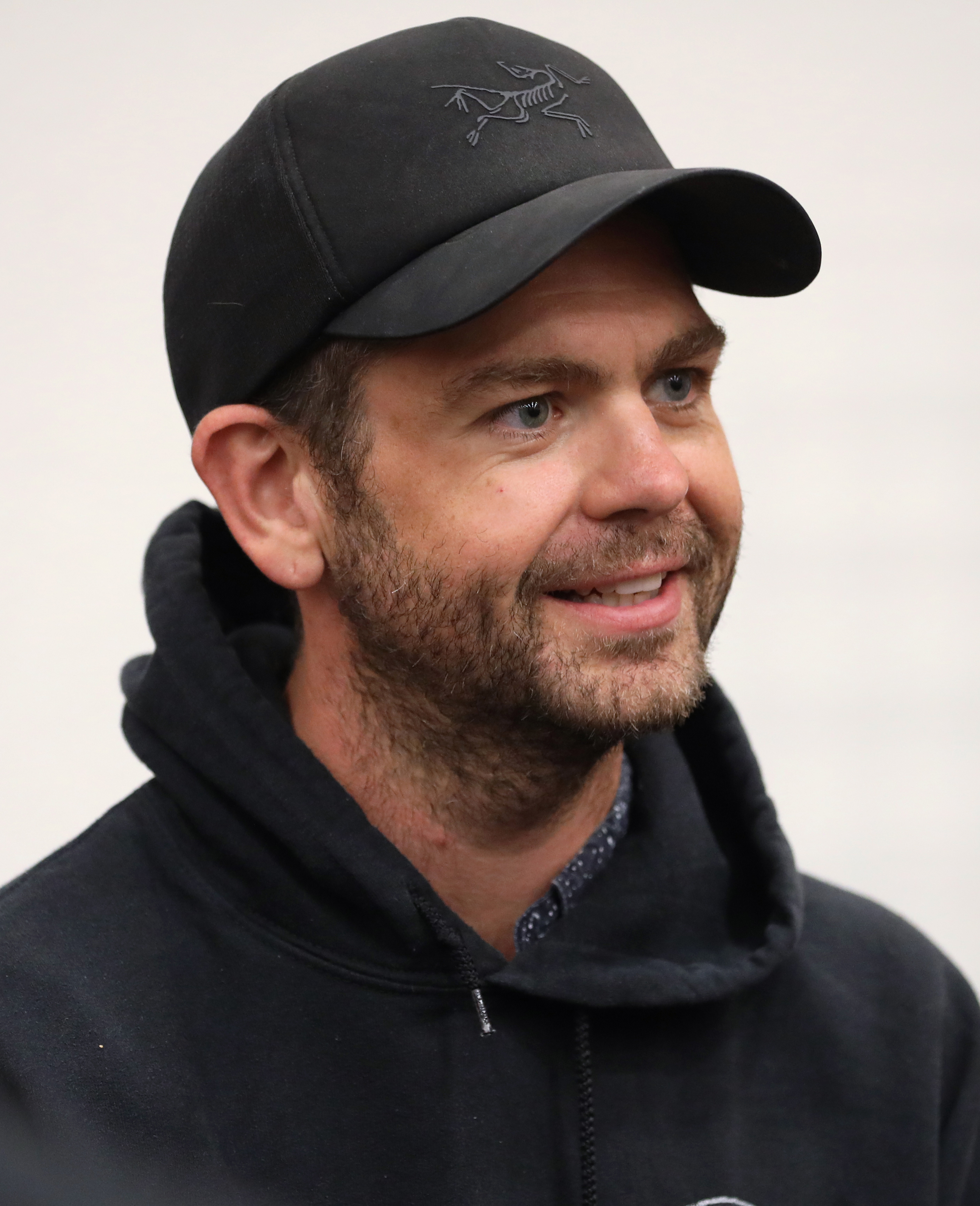
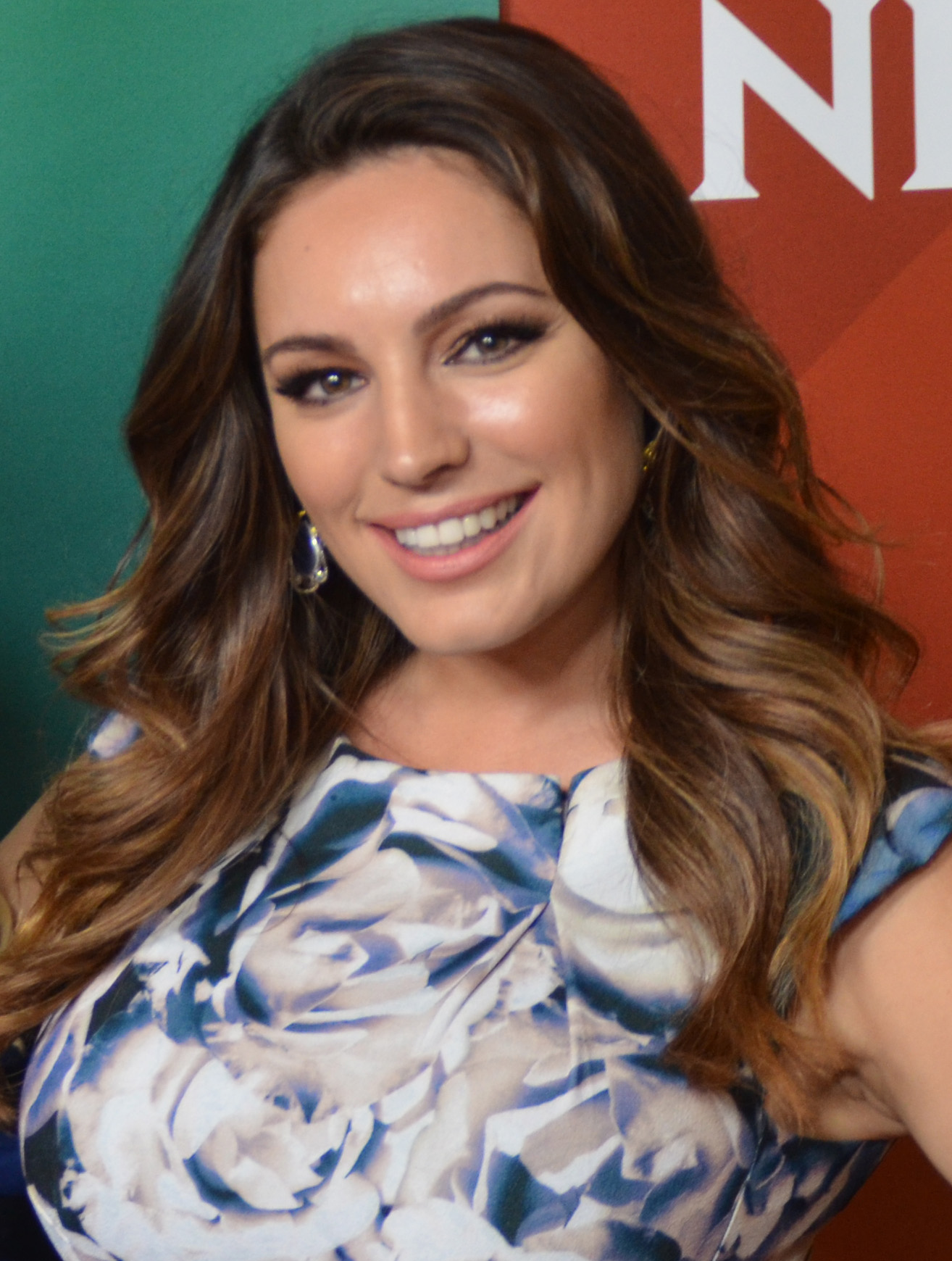
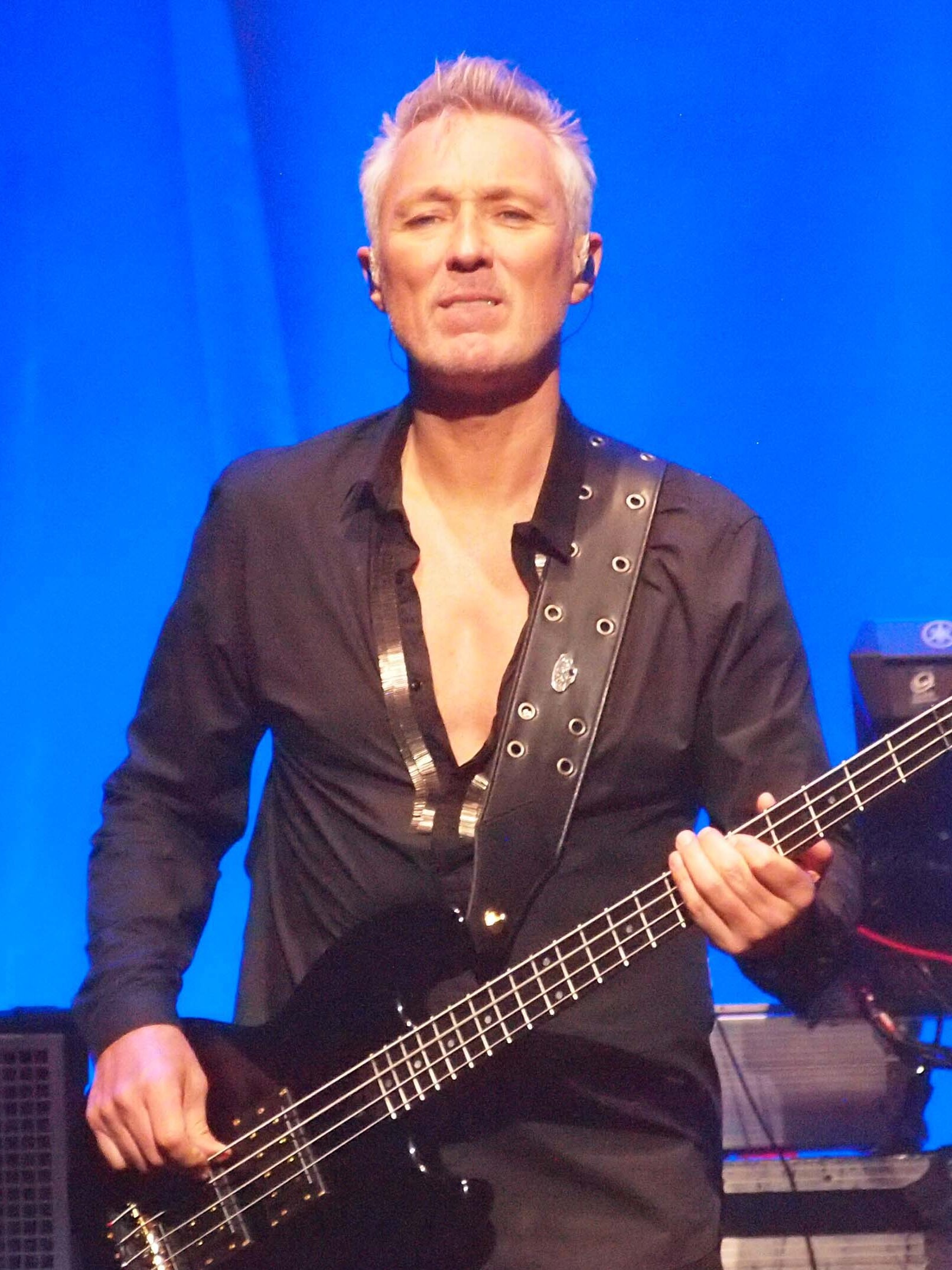
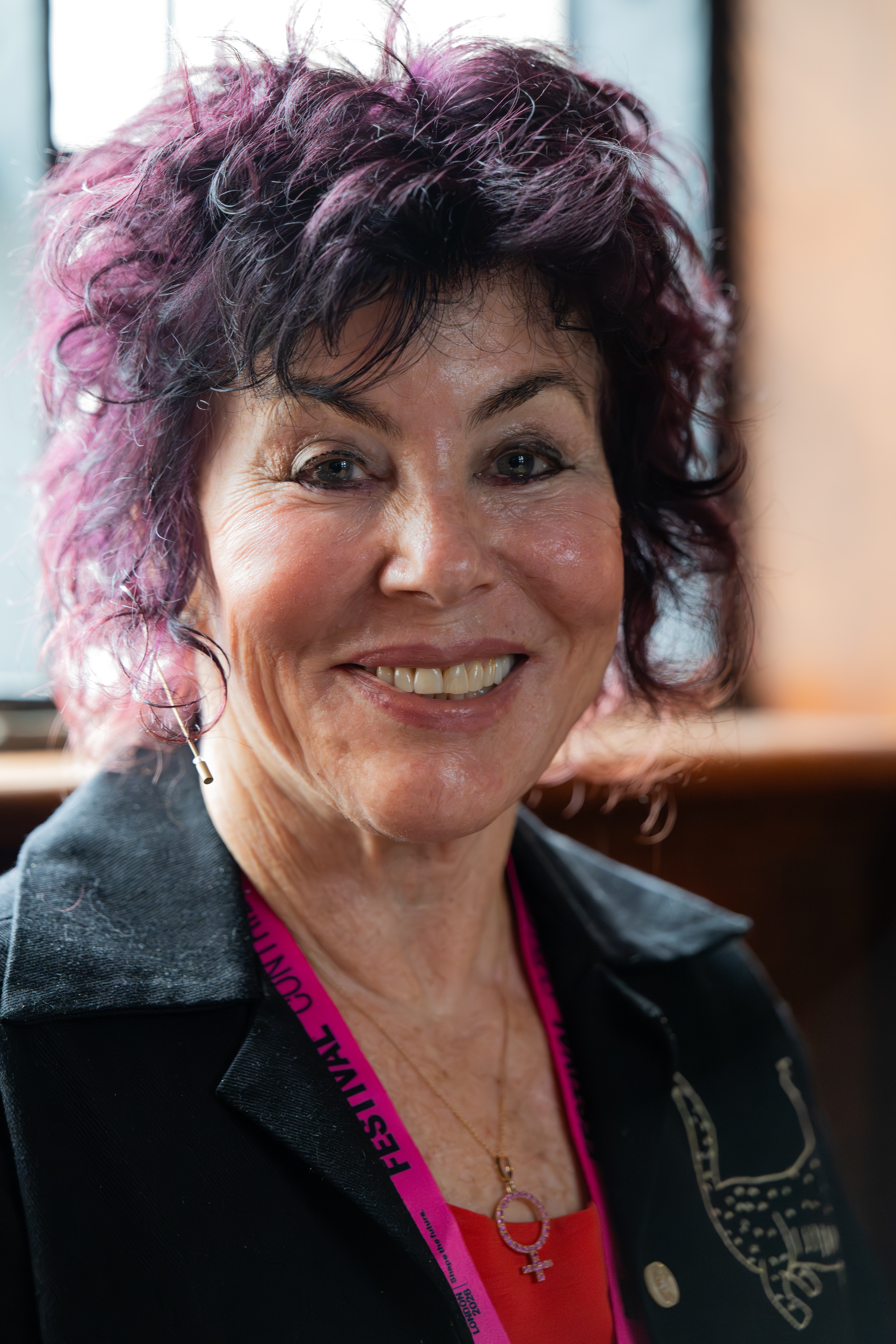
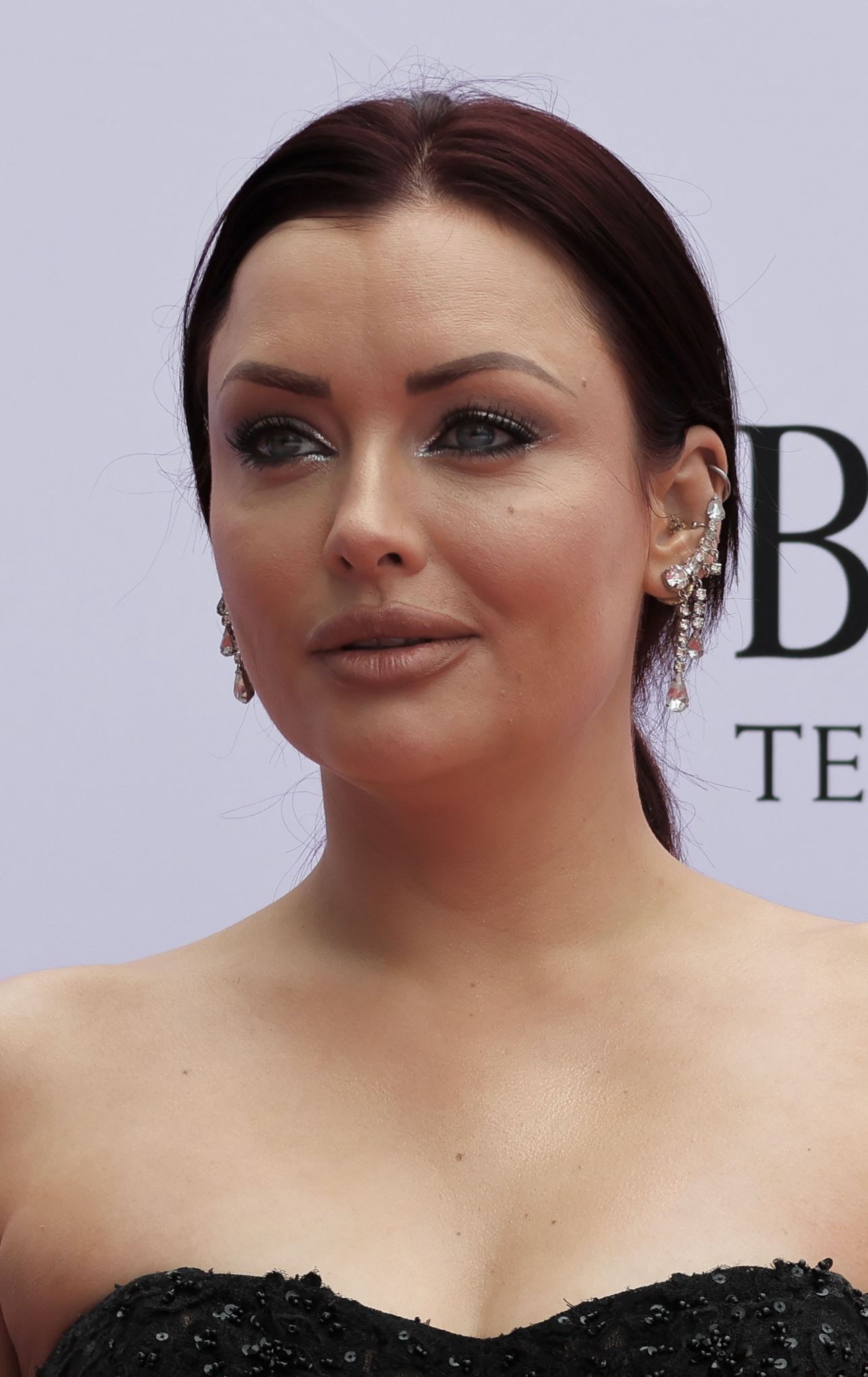
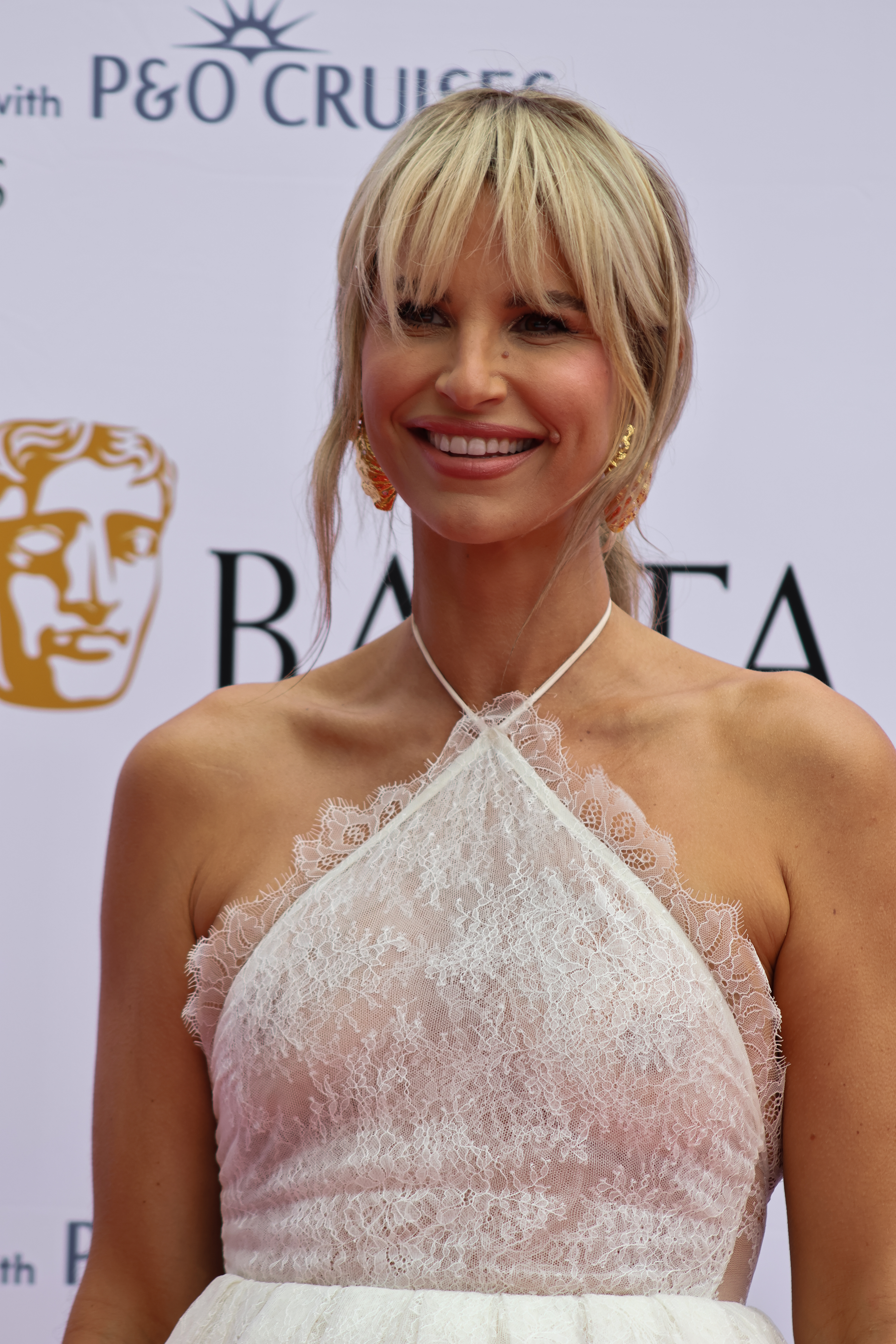
From left to right: Aitch, Alex Scott, Angryginge, Eddie Kadi, Jack Osbourne, Kelly Brook, Martin Kemp, Ruby Wax, Shona McGarty, and Vogue Williams.
Not pictured: Lisa Riley, and Tom Read Wilson.

| Celebrity | Known for | Status |
|---|---|---|
| Angryginge | Social media personality | Winner on 7 December 2025 |
| Tom Read Wilson | Celebs Go Dating client co-ordinator | Runner-up on 7 December 2025 |
| Shona McGarty | Former EastEnders actress | Third place on 7 December 2025 |
| Aitch | Rapper | Eliminated 9th on 6 December 2025 |
| Lisa Riley | Emmerdale actress | Eliminated 8th on 5 December 2025 |
| Jack Osbourne | Media personality | Eliminated 7th on 5 December 2025 |
| Martin Kemp | Spandau Ballet bassist & actor | Eliminated 6th on 4 December 2025 |
| Ruby Wax | Actress, comedian & television presenter | Eliminated 5th on 3 December 2025 |
| Kelly Brook | Model, actress & presenter | Eliminated 4th on 2 December 2025 |
| Vogue Williams | Media personality & presenter | Eliminated 3rd on 1 December 2025 |
| Eddie Kadi | Comedian & BBC Radio 1Xtra presenter | Eliminated 2nd on 30 November 2025 |
| Alex Scott | Former England footballer & television presenter | Eliminated 1st on 28 November 2025 |

== Results and elimination ==
Indicates that the celebrity was immune from the vote
Indicates that the celebrity received the most votes from the public
Indicates that the celebrity received the fewest votes and was eliminated immediately (no bottom two)
Indicates that the celebrity was named as being in the bottom two

Daily results per celebrity
| Celebrity | Day 13 | Day 15 | Day 16 | Day 17 | Day 18 | Day 19 | Day 20 | Day 21 | Day 22 | | Number of trials | Deals on Wheels challenges |
| Celebrity | Day 13 | Day 15 | Day 16 | Day 17 | Day 18 | Day 19 | Day 20 | Day 21 | Round 1 | Round 2 | Number of trials | Deals on Wheels challenges |
|---|---|---|---|---|---|---|---|---|---|---|---|---|
| Ginge | Safe | Safe | Safe | Safe | Safe | Safe | Safe | Safe | 1st 53.49% | Winner; 65.31% | 10 | 1 |
| Tom | Immune | Safe | Safe | Safe | Safe | Safe | Safe | Safe | 2nd 25.16% | Runner-up; 35.62% | 6 | 0 |
| Shona | Immune | Safe | Safe | Safe | Safe | Safe | Safe | Safe | 3rd 22.38% | Eliminated (Day 22) | 8 | 0 |
| Aitch | Safe | Safe | Safe | Safe | Safe | Safe | Safe | 4th | Eliminated (Day 21) | | 8 | 1 |
| Lisa | Immune | Safe | Safe | Bottom two | Bottom two | Bottom two | 5th | Eliminated (Day 20) | | | 4 | 1 |
| Jack | Safe | Safe | Safe | Safe | Safe | Safe | 6th | Eliminated (Day 20) | | | 6 | 0 |
| Martin | Safe | Safe | Safe | Safe | Safe | 7th | Eliminated (Day 19) | | | | 5 | 1 |
| Ruby | Safe | Safe | Safe | Safe | 8th | Eliminated (Day 18) | | | | | 6 | 1 |
| Kelly | Bottom two | Safe | Bottom two | 9th | Eliminated (Day 17) | | | | | | 5 | 2 |
| Vogue | Immune | Bottom two | 10th | Eliminated (Day 16) | | | | | | | 4 | 1 |
| Eddie | Immune | 11th | Eliminated (Day 15) | | | | | | | | 3 | 1 |
| Alex | 12th | Eliminated (Day 13) | | | | | | | | | 6 | 0 |
| Notes | 1 | None | | | | | | | 2 | | | |
| Bottom two (named in) | Alex, Kelly | Eddie, Vogue | Kelly, Vogue | Kelly, Lisa | Lisa, Ruby | Lisa, Martin | Jack, Lisa | None | | | | |
| Eliminated | Alex; Fewest votes to save | Eddie; Fewest votes to save | Vogue; Fewest votes to save | Kelly; Fewest votes to save | Ruby; Fewest votes to save | Martin; Fewest votes to save | Jack; Fewest votes to save | Aitch; Fewest votes to save | Shona; 22.38% (out of 3) to win | Tom; 35.62% (out of 2) | | |
| Eliminated | Alex; Fewest votes to save | Eddie; Fewest votes to save | Vogue; Fewest votes to save | Kelly; Fewest votes to save | Ruby; Fewest votes to save | Martin; Fewest votes to save | Lisa; Fewest votes to save | Aitch; Fewest votes to save | Shona; 22.38% (out of 3) to win | Ginge; 65.31% to win | | |

=== Notes ===
- ^Note 1: Eddie, Lisa, Shona, Tom and Vogue were immune from the first public vote, as a result of winning the live Bushtucker trial.
- ^Note 2: The public were voting for who they wanted to win rather than to save.

== Bushtucker trials ==
The contestants take part in daily trials to earn food. These trials aim to test both physical and mental abilities. The winner is usually determined by the number of stars collected during the trial, with each star representing a meal earned by the winning contestant for their fellow campmates. For this series, ITV introduced a new rule in which the same celebrity cannot be voted to take part in a bushtucker trial for more than two consecutive days in a row.

The public voted for who they wanted to face the trial
The contestants decided who would face the trial
The trial was compulsory and neither the public nor celebrities decided who took part

| Trial number | Air date | Name of trial | | Celebrity participation | Winner/ Win or Loss/ Number of stars | Notes |
|---|---|---|---|---|---|---|
| 1 | 16 November | The Cockie Van | | Alex; Kelly; Lisa; Martin; Ruby; Shona | 6/6 stars | (Note: Celebrities entered in two groups of five; Aitch, Eddie, Kelly, Martin and Shona; and Alex, Ginge, Jack, Lisa and Ruby. Each team had to compete in a challenge, with two from each team able to win fobs to the "Getaway Car", which meant they could travel into camp in a luxury vehicle and were given steak for dinner. Meanwhile the losing celebrities had to travel in The Cockie Van, and ultimately had to complete a trial to win their meals for that evening. Aitch, Eddie, Ginge and Jack won the "Getaway Car" fobs, with the remaining celebrities competing in the trial.) |
| 2 | 17 November | The Divey | | Ginge; Ruby | 10/10 stars | N/A |
| 3 | 18 November | The Jungle Doomsday Vault | | Aitch | 7/10 stars | N/A |
| 4 | 19 November | The A-scare-ium | | Eddie | 6/10 stars | (Note: Ruby was excluded from this trial on medical grounds.) |
| 5 | 20 November | Camp Fright | | Aitch; Ginge; Kelly | 8/12 stars | N/A |
| 6 | 21 November | Dreaded Dunnies | | Alex; Jack | 12/12 stars | (Note: As camp Chief Explorers, Tom and Vogue had to choose which two celebrities would join Alex and Jack in the trial) |
| 6 | 21 November | Dreaded Dunnies | | Martin; Shona | 12/12 stars | (Note: As camp Chief Explorers, Tom and Vogue had to choose which two celebrities would join Alex and Jack in the trial) |
| 7 | 22 November | Tents of Torment | | Alex; Shona | 12/12 stars | (Note: As camp Chief Explorers, Tom and Vogue distributed a series of different community badges to their fellow celebrities based on their behaviour within camp. As Alex and Shona were the only two remaining celebrities not to receive a badge, they automatically faced the trial, alongside Tom and Vogue.) |
| 7 | 22 November | Tents of Torment | | Tom; Vogue | 12/12 stars | (Note: As camp Chief Explorers, Tom and Vogue distributed a series of different community badges to their fellow celebrities based on their behaviour within camp. As Alex and Shona were the only two remaining celebrities not to receive a badge, they automatically faced the trial, alongside Tom and Vogue.) |
| 8 | 23 November | Terror-Flying Tours | | Ginge | 10/12 stars | N/A |
| 9 | 24 November | Night Night Sleep Tight | | Aitch | 11/12 stars | N/A |
| 10 | 25 November | Drown the Hatch | | Jack | 12/12 stars | |
| 11 | 26 November | Rivals | Face-Off | Lisa; Martin | Lisa | (Note: A vote opened in which the public had to put celebrities into rival pairs from two groups, having to choose between Aitch, Eddie, Kelly, Martin, Shona and Tom to pair with either Alex, Ginge, Jack, Lisa, Ruby and Vogue. Each rival pair subsequently completed a separate battle within the trial. The winner of each battle could return to main camp which had been transformed into "Win City", whilst the losers were sent to "Doomsville".) |
| 11 | 26 November | Rivals | Mind Games | Kelly; Vogue | Vogue | (Note: A vote opened in which the public had to put celebrities into rival pairs from two groups, having to choose between Aitch, Eddie, Kelly, Martin, Shona and Tom to pair with either Alex, Ginge, Jack, Lisa, Ruby and Vogue. Each rival pair subsequently completed a separate battle within the trial. The winner of each battle could return to main camp which had been transformed into "Win City", whilst the losers were sent to "Doomsville".) |
| 11 | 26 November | Rivals | Mouthing Off | Eddie; Jack | Jack | (Note: A vote opened in which the public had to put celebrities into rival pairs from two groups, having to choose between Aitch, Eddie, Kelly, Martin, Shona and Tom to pair with either Alex, Ginge, Jack, Lisa, Ruby and Vogue. Each rival pair subsequently completed a separate battle within the trial. The winner of each battle could return to main camp which had been transformed into "Win City", whilst the losers were sent to "Doomsville".) |
| 11 | 26 November | Rivals | Snaky Behaviour | Ruby; Tom | Ruby | (Note: A vote opened in which the public had to put celebrities into rival pairs from two groups, having to choose between Aitch, Eddie, Kelly, Martin, Shona and Tom to pair with either Alex, Ginge, Jack, Lisa, Ruby and Vogue. Each rival pair subsequently completed a separate battle within the trial. The winner of each battle could return to main camp which had been transformed into "Win City", whilst the losers were sent to "Doomsville".) |
| 11 | 26 November | Rivals | Eye to Eye | Alex; Shona | Alex | (Note: A vote opened in which the public had to put celebrities into rival pairs from two groups, having to choose between Aitch, Eddie, Kelly, Martin, Shona and Tom to pair with either Alex, Ginge, Jack, Lisa, Ruby and Vogue. Each rival pair subsequently completed a separate battle within the trial. The winner of each battle could return to main camp which had been transformed into "Win City", whilst the losers were sent to "Doomsville".) |
| 11 | 26 November | Rivals | Blood Bath | Aitch; Ginge | Ginge | (Note: A vote opened in which the public had to put celebrities into rival pairs from two groups, having to choose between Aitch, Eddie, Kelly, Martin, Shona and Tom to pair with either Alex, Ginge, Jack, Lisa, Ruby and Vogue. Each rival pair subsequently completed a separate battle within the trial. The winner of each battle could return to main camp which had been transformed into "Win City", whilst the losers were sent to "Doomsville".) |
| 12 | 27 November | Rivals: The Pits | | Aitch; Ginge | Aitch | (Note: A vote opened in which the public had to decide which pair of "rivals" would compete in the trial.) |
| 13 (Live) | 27 November | Rivals: Cocktails of Cruelty | | Eddie; Jack | Eddie | (Note: Each rival pair competed against each other, with the winner receiving immunity from the first elimination and a meal for camp. As Aitch and Ginge failed to complete the trial, they both lost and were therefore up for elimination.) |
| 13 (Live) | 27 November | Rivals: Cocktails of Cruelty | | Alex; Shona | Shona | (Note: Each rival pair competed against each other, with the winner receiving immunity from the first elimination and a meal for camp. As Aitch and Ginge failed to complete the trial, they both lost and were therefore up for elimination.) |
| 13 (Live) | 27 November | Rivals: Cocktails of Cruelty | | Aitch; Ginge | —N/a | (Note: Each rival pair competed against each other, with the winner receiving immunity from the first elimination and a meal for camp. As Aitch and Ginge failed to complete the trial, they both lost and were therefore up for elimination.) |
| 13 (Live) | 27 November | Rivals: Cocktails of Cruelty | | Lisa; Martin | Lisa | (Note: Each rival pair competed against each other, with the winner receiving immunity from the first elimination and a meal for camp. As Aitch and Ginge failed to complete the trial, they both lost and were therefore up for elimination.) |
| 13 (Live) | 27 November | Rivals: Cocktails of Cruelty | | Kelly; Vogue | Vogue | (Note: Each rival pair competed against each other, with the winner receiving immunity from the first elimination and a meal for camp. As Aitch and Ginge failed to complete the trial, they both lost and were therefore up for elimination.) |
| 13 (Live) | 27 November | Rivals: Cocktails of Cruelty | | Ruby; Tom | Tom | (Note: Each rival pair competed against each other, with the winner receiving immunity from the first elimination and a meal for camp. As Aitch and Ginge failed to complete the trial, they both lost and were therefore up for elimination.) |
| 14 | 28 November | The Cave | | Aitch; Alex; Ginge; Jack; Kelly; Ruby | 5/6 stars | (Note: Only the celebrities who lost Cocktails of Cruelty were eligible for this trial, however as there were only 6 spaces, Martin was randomly selected to sit out.) |
| 15 | 29 November | Wrecking Balls of Rage | | Vogue | 11/11 stars | —N/a |
| 16 | 30 November | Mine of Misery | | Lisa | 8/11 stars | |
| 17 | 1 December | The Misfortune Tellers | | Ruby | 5/10 stars | —N/a |
| 18 | 2 December | Walk the Plank | | Shona | 8/9 stars | —N/a |
| 19 | 3 December | Dangerous Discoveries | | Jack | 7/8 stars | —N/a |
| 20 | 4 December | Lethal Library | | Martin; Tom | 5/7 stars | —N/a |
| 21 | 5 December | Worst-Day Cake | | Ginge | 6/6 stars | —N/a |
| 22 | 6 December | Celebrity Cyclone | | Aitch; Ginge; Shona; Tom | 4/4 stars | —N/a |
| 23 | 7 December | Rat Race | | Shona | 4/4 stars | —N/a |
| 24 | 7 December | Bushtucker Bonanza | | Tom | 4/4 stars | —N/a |
| 25 | 7 December | Helmets of Hell | | Ginge | 4/4 stars | —N/a |

== Star count ==
| Celebrity | Number of stars earned | Percentage |
|---|---|---|
| Angryginge | 47/54 stars | 87% |
| Tom Read Wilson | 25/27 stars | 93% |
| Shona McGarty | 46/47 stars | 98% |
| Aitch | 35/44 stars | 80% |
| Lisa Riley | 14/17 stars | 82% |
| Jack Osbourne | 36/38 stars | 95% |
| Martin Kemp | 23/25 stars | 92% |
| Ruby Wax | 26/32 stars | 81% |
| Kelly Brook | 19/24 stars | 79% |
| Vogue Williams | 23/23 stars | 100% |
| Eddie Kadi | 6/10 stars | 60% |
| Alex Scott | 35/36 stars | 97% |

== Deals on Wheels challenges ==
As well as competing in the Bushtucker trials, celebrities have to complete in "Deals on Wheels challenges" in order to earn treats for the camp. At least two celebrities are chosen to compete in the challenge. These are often mental challenges, rather than challenges including critters. They must complete the challenge they have been given in order to win 'Dingo Dollars'.

After completion of the challenge, the celebrities will take the Dingo Dollars and purchase a snack from Kiosk Kev, who for this series was located in an ice cream van. Before they are allowed to take the prize, the other celebrities back at the living quarters must answer a trivia question. If they get the question right, they will earn the treat, but if they get it wrong, the celebrities will go back empty-handed.

The celebrities got the question correct
The celebrities got the question wrong
No question was asked

| Episode | Air date | Celebrities | Prize | Notes |
|---|---|---|---|---|
| 2 | 17 November | Kelly; Martin | Chocolate Jazzies | —N/a |
| 9 | 24 November | Lisa; Ruby | Crisps | —N/a |
| 13 | 28 November | Eddie; Vogue | Animal Biscuits | —N/a |
| 16 | 1 December | Aitch; Ginge; Kelly | Milk Bottles; Jack's Letter from Home | —N/a |

== Camp Leaders ==
| Celebrity | | Original Run | | No. of days |
| | Leaders | First day | Last day | No. of days |
|---|---|---|---|---|
| 1 | Tom Vogue | 5 | 8 | 4 |
| 2 | Aitch Ginge | 8 | 14 | 7 |
| 3 | Ruby ~~Shona~~ (Note: Shona was initially voted to become Camp Leader, however after consuming contraband in camp the following day, she was forced to step down. The campmates selected Ruby as her replacement) Lisa | 14 | 18 | 5 |

== Ratings ==
Official ratings are taken from BARB, utilising the four-screen dashboard which includes viewers who watched the programme on laptops, smartphones and tablets within 7 days of the original broadcast.

| Episode | Air date | Official rating (millions incl. HD & +1) | Weekly rank for all UK TV channels |
|---|---|---|---|
| 1 | 16 November | 10.21 | 1 |
| 2 | 17 November | 9.57 | 1 |
| 3 | 18 November | 7.89 | 8 |
| 4 | 19 November | 8.52 | 3 |
| 5 | 20 November | 8.68 | 2 |
| 6 | 21 November | 8.18 | 6 |
| 7 | 22 November | 8.19 | 5 |
| 8 | 23 November | 8.30 | 4 |
| 9 | 24 November | 8.25 | 1 |
| 10 | 25 November | 7.52 | 5 |
| 11 | 26 November | 7.79 | 3 |
| 12 | 27 November | 8.07 | 2 |
| 13 | 28 November | 7.61 | 4 |
| 14 | 29 November | 6.86 | 9 |
| 15 | 30 November | 7.43 | 7 |
| 16 | 1 December | 7.81 | 2 |
| 17 | 2 December | 7.79 | 3 |
| 18 | 3 December | 7.37 | 6 |
| 19 | 4 December | 7.45 | 4 |
| 20 | 5 December | 7.12 | 8 |
| 21 | 6 December | 6.89 | 9 |
| 22 | 7 December | 8.26 | 1 |
| Series average | 2025 | 7.99 | —N/a |
| Coming Out | 13 December | 4.50 | 7 |
