= Tays Taylor =

British content creator and rapper

Tays
- Born: Michael Taylor; 1 January 2003 (age 23); Manchester, England
- Occupations: Content creator; streamer; musician
- Years active: 2020–present
- Known for: Member of The Bov Boys; Housemate on Big Brother 23 (UK)

Twitch information
- Channel: taysmcrr
- Genres: Gaming; Reaction; Sports
- Game: FIFA
- Followers: 273 thousand

YouTube information
- Channel: taysmcr
- Years active: 2020–present
- Genres: Gaming; Reaction; Sports
- Subscribers: 255 thousand
- Last updated: 27 September 2026

Michael Taylor, known professionally by his stage name Tays, is an English content creator, streamer, and musician. In September 2026, he entered the twenty-third civilian series of the British reality television show Big Brother as a secret fake housemate and undercover "mole."

== Early life and career ==
Taylor was raised in Manchester, England. He began building an online presence as a streamer and digital content creator, broadcasting primarily on Twitch and YouTube. In 2024, he rose to prominence within the UK streaming community after winning the fifth season of the live-streamed reality web show Locked In.

Following his victory, Taylor became an integral member of the Manchester-based online content collective "The Bov Boys", alongside digital creators Angryginge (Morgan Burtwistle), Chazzer (Charlie Clark), Jakey (Jake Davis), and Heinz Baines (Ryan Mcaul). Outside of live streaming, Taylor has released music as a singer and rapper, and co-hosts the Off Stream podcast.

== Big Brother 23 ==
In September 2026, ITV hosted a 24-hour pre-series takeover of the Big Brother house streamed live on Twitch and YouTube, featuring members of The Bov Boys alongside other digital creators. At the conclusion of the event, producers announced that one creator would remain inside the house as an undercover plant for the main series.

Taylor entered the house under his stage name Tays during the live launch of Big Brother 23 on 13 September 2026. Unbeknownst to the other contestants, Taylor was not a legitimate housemate competing for the main cash prize, but rather an undercover mole tasked with executing secret producer missions, selecting an accomplice, and nominating three genuine housemates for the season's first public eviction.

The twist generated mixed commentary from television critics and viewers. While some praised the cross-platform stunt for bridging online streaming culture with linear television, others questioned the inclusion of established content creators in a civilian format.

Taylor completed his week-long undercover role and exited the house during the first live eviction broadcast on 18 September 2026.

== Filmography ==
Year	Title	Role	Notes	Ref.
2024	Locked In	Contestant	Season 5; Winner	
2026	Big Brother	Mole	Series 23; House guest	
