= Angryginge =

English live streamer (born 2001)

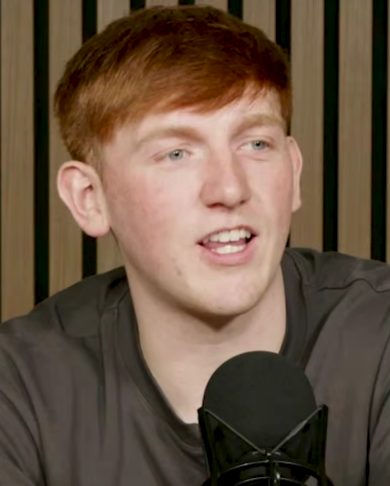
- Burtwistle in 2026
- Born: Morgan Sam Lee Burtwistle; 13 November 2001 (age 25); Salford, Greater Manchester, England
- Occupations: Twitch streamer; YouTuber

Twitch information
- Channel: angryginge13
- Years active: 2020–present
- Genres: Gaming; Reaction; Sports
- Game: FIFA
- Followers: 1.6 million

YouTube information
- Channel: angryginge13
- Years active: 2021–present
- Genres: Gaming; Reaction; Sports
- Subscribers: 1.06 million
- Views: 114 million
- Last updated: 4 September 2026

Morgan Sam Lee Burtwistle (born 13 November 2001), known professionally as Angryginge, (Note: Also known as Angryginge13 or simply Ginge. "Ginge" is a pejorative term in the United Kingdom for people with red hair.) is an English live streamer who is primarily known for creating FIFA and football-related content. As of February 2026, he has amassed over 1.5 million followers on Twitch and over 1 million subscribers on YouTube.

Born and raised in Greater Manchester, also Bacup, Burtwistle began his Twitch career during the COVID-19 pandemic in 2020. He was nominated for "Best Sports Streamer" at the Streamer Awards in 2024 and 2025. He appeared as a contestant on the first season of Inside (2024), a reality competition show by the Sidemen. In 2025, he won the twenty-fifth series of I'm a Celebrity...Get Me Out of Here!. He is also known for participating in several charity football matches, including the Sidemen Charity Match and Soccer Aid.

== Early life ==
Morgan Sam Lee Burtwistle was born on 13 November 2001 in Salford, Greater Manchester, England. He and his sister were raised almost entirely by their single parent mother after their father left the family when Burtwistle was one year old. He grew up on a council estate in nearby Eccles.

== Career ==
=== 2020–2022: Early career and initial popularity ===
Burtwistle created his Twitch account in October 2020 and started streaming FIFA gameplay. In an interview in December 2024, he cited fellow FIFA streamer Castro1021 as his inspiration to start streaming. On his first stream, he managed to peak at 40 viewers playing FIFA and managed to average around six or seven viewers afterwards.

He later took a break from streaming for four to five months due to not enjoying it. He came back to streaming in March 2021, this time transitioning from part-time to full-time streaming. Later that year he began creating content on TikTok, which in turn grew his following. He created his YouTube account in September 2021 and started uploading FIFA 22 gameplay in October 2021.

=== 2023–present: Football content, reality show, The Bov Boys, and mainstream popularity ===
On 9 September 2023, he played in the Sidemen charity football match hosted at the London Stadium, where he played for team Sidemen F.C.

On 23 February 2024, Burtwistle participated in "Match for Hope 2024", a football charity match hosted at Ahmad bin Ali Stadium, Qatar, where he played for team Chunkz. In March 2024, Burtwistle and fellow British YouTuber Yung Filly founded an EA Sports FC 24 pro club called "Girth n Turf". The club later gained popularity online and would later be joined by other content creators such as IShowSpeed and Behzinga. Later in April 2024, the club gained media attention when professional darts player Luke Littler and former English footballer Wayne Rooney joined the club.

On 2 June 2024, Burtwistle played in a football charity match hosted by British YouTube group Beta Squad and American YouTube group AMP at Selhurst Park, London, England, where he played for team Beta Squad. The event raised money for The Water Project. That same month, he participated as a contestant in a reality competition show created and hosted by the Sidemen called Inside.

In October 2024, he started a new YouTube series called "We are Yanited", where he took over and started managing Winton Wanderers Yanited FC, a grassroots under-18 football club, and attempted to lead the team through Division 1 of the U-18 Bolton Bury & District League. On 5 December 2024, he joined as a player for Red Bull esports. Later on 7 December 2024, he was nominated for Best Sports Streamer at the 2024 Streamer Awards.

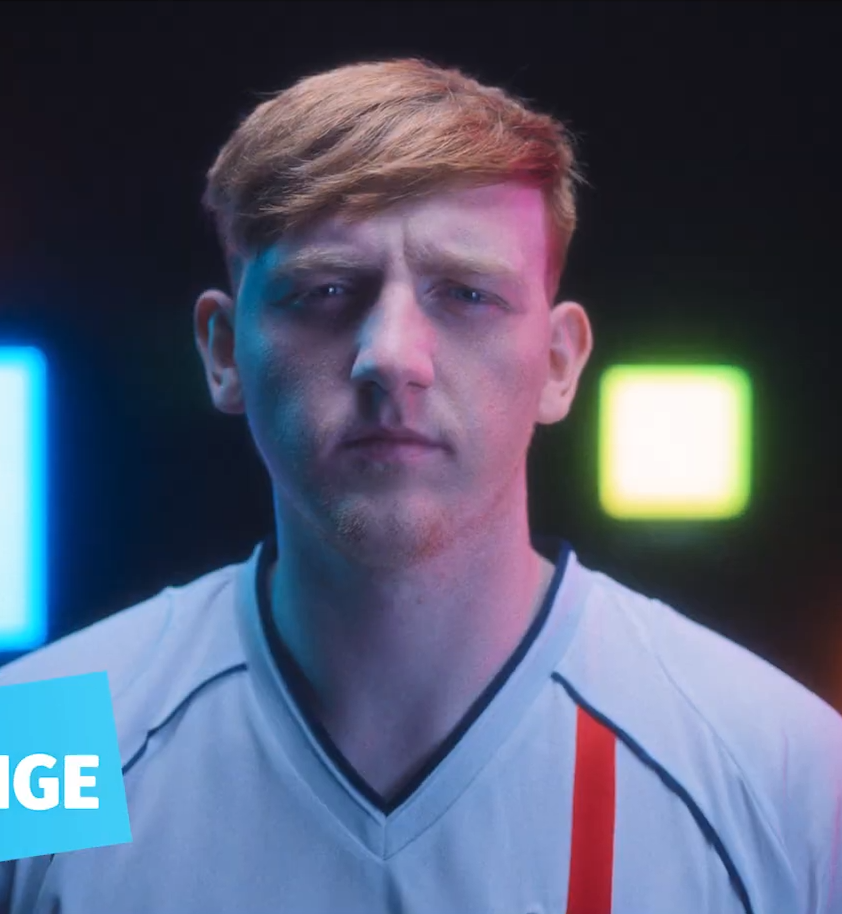
Burtwistle during Soccer Aid promotional shoot in 2025

On 14 February 2025, he participated in "Match for Hope 2025", a football charity event hosted in Doha, Qatar, as a player for team AboFlah & KSI, facing off against team Chunkz & IShowSpeed. The match ended with team AboFlah & KSI's 6–5 victory over team Chunkz & IShowSpeed. The event managed to raise more than $10.7 million for charity.

On 8 March 2025, he participated in the 2025 Sidemen Charity Match, held at Wembley Stadium in London, United Kingdom, this time playing for team YouTube Allstars. He managed to score a goal in the 58th minute. On 4 May 2025, he participated in the "Big Charity Bash", a charity football match organized by Sheffield United raising funds for the Weston Park Cancer Charity's MRI simulator appeal, playing as part of Team Sky Sports facing against the Sheffield United 2016–17 team. On 15 June 2025, he participated in Soccer Aid 2025, held at Old Trafford stadium in Manchester, United Kingdom, playing for team England facing against team World XI. The match ended with World XI 5–4 victory over team England. Despite the loss, he was awarded the official Man of the Match.

On 4 July 2025, Burtwistle and two other YouTubers - Charlie "NYKChazza" Clark and Samuel "SamHam" Imie - were arrested at the Silverstone Circuit whilst attending and livestreaming the 2025 British Grand Prix weekend after they were alleged to have caused thousands of pounds worth of criminal damage to a Racing Point RP19 on display at around 2.30 pm. His livestream depicted the car unguarded by security before Chazza climbed into and allegedly damaged it. They were released without charge having been held in custody by Northamptonshire Police for what Burtwistle claimed was 15 hours. Neither Burtwistle nor the others involved were allowed to return for the remainder of the event.

On 5 July 2025, it was announced that Daisy Hill F.C.'s stadium, a football club owned by YouTuber Aaron Hunt, would be named the Ginge Power Stadium for the 2025/26 season after sponsorship from Burtwistle.

In July 2025, Burtwistle along with fellow content creators Tays, Heinz Baines, NYKChazza and Jakey Davies, launched a new YouTube group called The Bov Boys, posting videos every week on a Friday. The content includes challenges similar to the videos of fellow British content collectives Sidemen and Beta Squad, and surpassed 100,000 subscribers on the platform, within less than two weeks of its inception.

In November 2025, it was announced that Burtwistle would be competing in the twenty-fifth series of I'm a Celebrity...Get Me Out of Here!. On 7 December 2025, Burtwistle was announced as the winner of the series and was crowned "King of the Jungle".

On 28 February 2026, Burtwistle presented the award for International Song of the Year at the Brit Awards 2026, along with Luke Littler. The following week, it was announced that Burtwistle would be once again participating in Soccer Aid, this time at London Stadium in May 2026.

In August 2026, Burtwistle along with content creators Tays, Heinz Baines, NYKChazza and Jakey Davies, otherwise known as the Bov Boys, took part in a 24/7 livestream called the Bovathon, where they streamed their entire lives for one week.

On 4 November 2026, Burtwistle announced he was leaving The BOV Boys after 18 months with the group. He thanked fans for their support and said that although he was leaving, his friendships with Tays, Heinz Baines, NYKChazza and Jakey Davies would continue. He also confirmed he would still appear on their streams and that it wasn’t goodbye, but a see you later.

== Other ventures ==
=== Baller League UK ===
In November 2024, it was announced that Burtwistle would manage one of the twelve teams in the inaugural Baller League UK, a six-a-side football competition broadcast on Sky Sports. In March 2025, it was revealed that Burtwistle would manage a team named Yanited. The team won its opening match on 24 March 2025, defeating N5 FC 7–2. Yanited finished third in the league table, securing a place in the final four. The semi-final matches were held at The O2 Arena in London, where Yanited were defeated 5–1 by Maya Jama's MVPs United.

== Personal life ==
Burtwistle is a lifelong supporter of Manchester United and appeared in the club's promotional campaign for their 2024–25 season kit. He idolised former Manchester United player Wayne Rooney growing up.

== Filmography ==
Web roles
Year	Title	Role	Network	Notes	Ref.
2024	Inside	Contestant	YouTube, Side+, Netflix	Series 1	

Television roles
Year	Title	Role	Network	Notes	Ref.
2025–2026	Baller League UK	Manager	Sky Sports Mix	Six-a-side football league	
2025	I'm a Celebrity...Get Me Out of Here!	Contestant	ITV	Series 25, winner	

== Awards and nominations ==
Year	Ceremony	Category	Result	Ref.
2024	The Streamer Awards	Best Sports Streamer	Nominated	
2025	The Streamer Awards	Best Sports Streamer	Nominated	
2026	National Reality TV Awards	Best IRL Streamer	Won	

== Notes ==
Preceded by Danny Jones	I'm a Celebrity... Get Me Out of Here! Winner & King of the Jungle; 2025	Succeeded by Incumbent
