= Gwrych Castle =

19th-century Gothic Revival castle in Wales

- Castell Gwrych
- Abergele, Wales
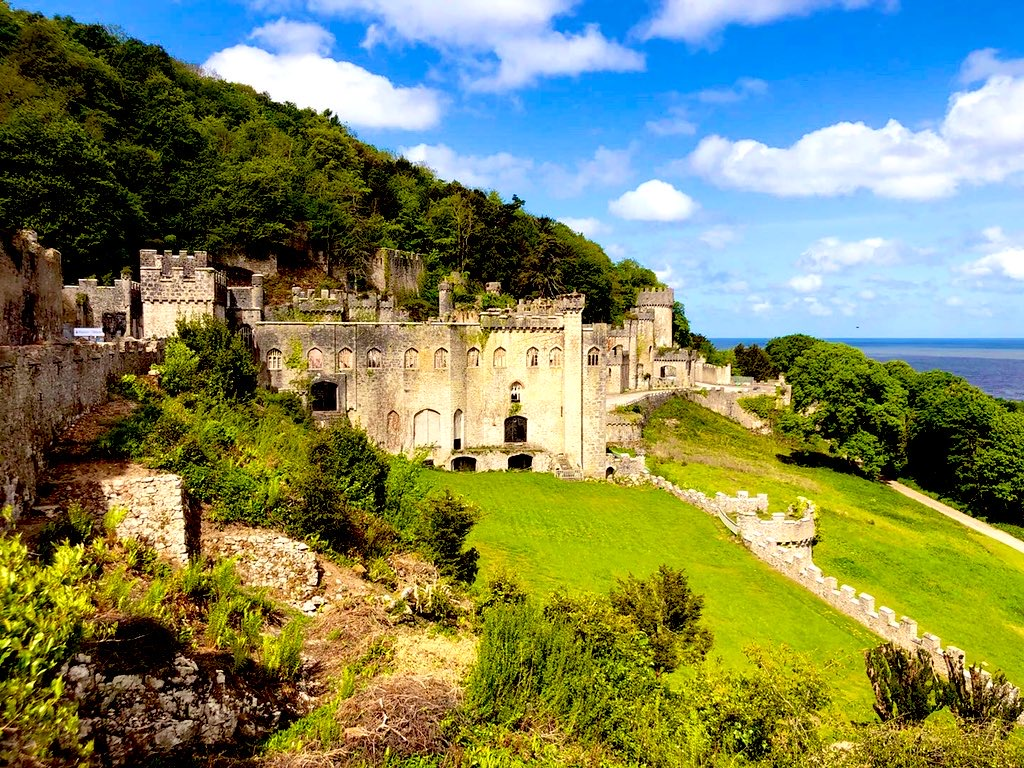
- East wing of the castle

Site information
- Type: Gothic revival
- Owner: Gwrych Castle Preservation Trust
- Condition: Derelict, being restored
- Website: www.gwrychcastle.co.uk

Location
- Location shown within Abergele
- Coordinates: 53.2833°N 3.6087°W

Site history
- Built: Original building c.14th/15th centuries; Rebuilt 1810 onwards
- Built by: Lloyd Hesketh Bamford-Hesketh (1812–1822); Charles Augustin Busby (Completed 1815); Thomas Rickman (1819–1820); Henry Kennedy (c. 1840s); George Edmund Street (c. 1870s); Detmar Blow (1914)
- In use: Open to public
- Materials: Cast iron, grey and white limestone

Listed Building – Grade I

Gwrych Castle (Welsh: Castell Gwrych; pronounced [ˌkastɛɬ ˈɡwrɨːχ]) is a Grade I listed country house near Abergele in Conwy County Borough, Wales. On an ancient site, the building was created by Lloyd Hesketh Bamford-Hesketh and his descendants over much of the 19th and early 20th centuries. The castle and its 236-acre (96 ha) estate are now owned by a charity, the Gwrych Castle Preservation Trust.

The family had owned land in the Abergele area since at least the 16th century and claimed much older descent. In the very early 19th century Lloyd Hesketh Bamford-Hesketh determined to replace the existing house with a much larger building. Designs were prepared by Charles Busby and exhibited in 1815. Busby was subsequently dismissed and Thomas Rickman engaged, while Bamford-Hesketh's ambitions grew from a Regency style country house into an enormous Gothic Revival castle. The foundation stone was laid in 1819. Bamford-Hesketh's heirs continued his building, and at various times C. E. Elcock and Detmar Blow worked at the castle until it achieved its final, immense, extent. In the later Victorian and Edwardian eras the castle was run as a full-scale country house, and Queen Victoria and Edward VIII, Prince of Wales both visited it.

The presiding spirit was Winifred Bamford-Hesketh, Lloyd Bamford Hesketh's granddaughter. She was his sole heir, and Countess of Dundonald following her wedding to Douglas Cochrane in 1878. The marriage was not a success, and the countess pursued her interests at Gwrych and in London, while the earl served in Canada and as a courtier to Edward VII and George V. On her death in 1924, the countess bequeathed the castle, whose ownership she had retained, to George V, in the hope that it would become the official Welsh residence of the Prince of Wales; but the bequest was declined. It was subsequently repurchased by her husband, but the family never returned to live there.

During World War II Gwrych was home to 200 Jewish children brought to Britain under the Kindertransport programme. At the war's end, the Dundonalds sold the castle. For the next forty years it operated as a tourist attraction and as a hospitality venue, but it finally closed to the public in 1987. The next decades were disastrous for the structure; failed plans for development saw the castle asset-stripped of much of its fabric and furnishings, including the lead roofs, and by the 21st century it was a ruined shell. In 2018 the castle, together with some 200 acres (80 ha) were sold to the Gwrych Castle Preservation Trust. The trust had been established by architectural author Mark Baker, who had witnessed the castle's destruction as a child and had determined on its rescue. Since 2018, the trust has worked to stabilise and restore the castle. Between 2020 and 2021 the castle received publicity and funding when it was used for the filming of I'm a Celebrity...Get Me Out of Here!.

== Early history of the site ==
Gwrych (originally spelt 'Y Gwrŷch' meaning "The hedge") occupies an ancient site. The earliest description is recorded in an early 16th century deed:

Indenture of demise, 20 April, 27 Henry VIII [1536], by Owen ap Gruffith ap Jevaun ap Gruffith [Owen son of Gruffydd son of Ieuan son of Gruffydd], to Gruffith ap Jevaun ap Gruffith [Gruffydd son of Ieuan son of Gruffydd], for the term of his life, of two parcels of land, in the town of Abergelle (Abergele), in the comote of Isulat [Isaled hundred], within the lordship of Dembych (Dinbych), the one in a place called 'y gwrych', between the highway from Abergele to Conwey (Conwy) and the common pasture, &c. and the second in place called 'y morva', [Y Morfa, the sea-marsh] next land of the heirs of Roger Mylton, &c.; rent, 2d. to the said Owen and to the king 2s. 9d.

The Lloyds (Llwyds) of Plas yn y Gwrych were the ancestral owners of Gwrych and could trace their ancestry back to the medieval period. Situated within the Gwrych Castle Estate are a pair of Iron Age hillforts, a Roman shrine, lead and silver mines and medieval battle sites; the last of these are recorded on stone tablets at the principal entrance.

== Victorian heyday ==
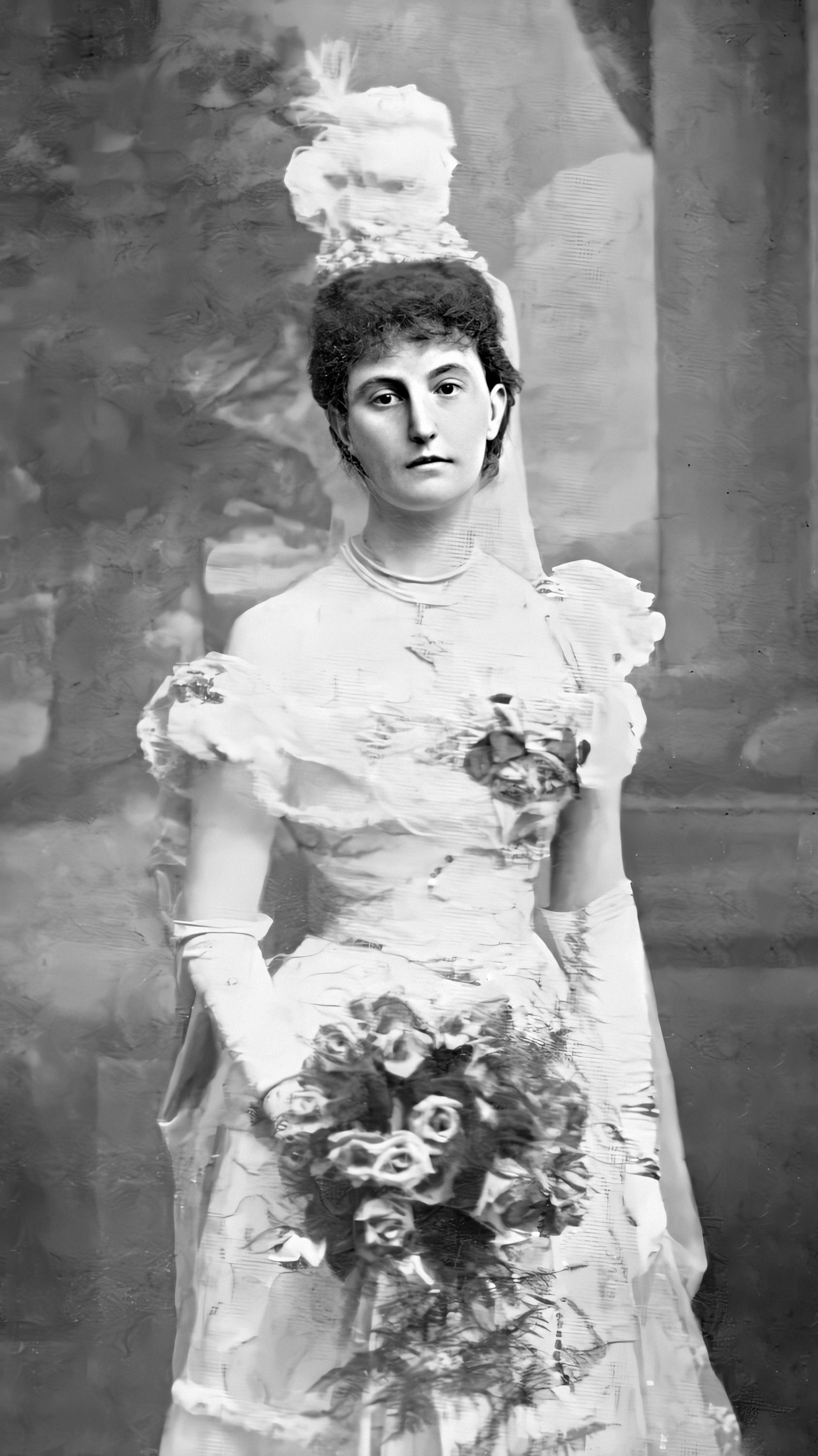
Gwrych's Edwardian era châtelaine

Gwrych Castle was built between 1810 and 1825 by Lloyd Hesketh Bamford-Hesketh (1787–1861), in memory of his mother Frances Lloyd and her ancestors. It incorporated an earlier house that had been in the ownership of the Lloyds since the late-medieval period. Designs for Gwrych by Charles Busby were exhibited at the Royal Academy exhibition in London in 1815. Bamford-Hesketh subsequently turned to Thomas Rickman and designs for the castle evolved from a Regency style country house into a Gothic Revival castle. Queen Victoria is claimed to have stayed at the castle, during a visit to North Wales. In 1894 the castle was inherited by Winifred Bamford-Hesketh, Lloyd Bamford Hesketh's granddaughter, and his sole heir. Winifred had married Douglas Cochrane in 1878 and became Countess of Dundonald on her husband's succession to the earldom in 1885. Lady Jean Cochrane, the couple's fourth child, spent most of her youth at Gwrych Castle. The marriage was not a close one, and Winifred spent much of her time at Gwyrch and in London, choosing not to accompany her husband overseas when he served as General Officer Commanding the Militia of Canada between 1902 and 1904. The castle remained the countess's personal property, and on her death in 1924 she bequeathed it to King George V, in the hope that it would become the principal Welsh residence of the Prince of Wales. However, the gift was refused, and the castle passed to the Venerable Order of Saint John. In 1928, it was bought back by the late countess's former husband for £78,000 (equivalent to £4,200,000 in 2025), who then sold the contents to meet the cost.

== Later history ==
Gwrych castle was offered rent-free by Lord Dundonald - who also made a grant towards rates and taxes and paid half the cost of repairs - a necessarily generous offer since the castle had been uninhabited for over fifteen years. The greatest virtue of the castle was the land that came with it - 500 rough but serviceable acres. The first residents arrived from Kent on 31 August 1939, a pre-emptive move against the imminent mass evacuation

— And the policeman smiled Barry Turner (1990)

During the Second World War, as part of the Kindertransport programme, the Government used the castle from 1939 to 1941 to house 200 Jewish refugees; it was run by the Jewish Zionist youth movement Bnei Akiva. Daniel Sperber was born there in this period.

After the war, the Dundonalds put the estate up for sale and in 1946 it was purchased by Robert Rennie who opened it as a visitor attraction, "The Showpiece of Wales". It was then sold to Leslie Salts and was said to have attracted nearly 10 million visitors.

It was also used as a training venue for the English World Middleweight boxing champion Randolph Turpin in the early 1950s. In the early 1960s it was an occasional venue for the famous motorcycle Dragon Rally, and in the 1970s it was used as a centre for medieval re-enactments, attracting tourists with such events as jousting and banquets. Lemmy, the lead singer, bassist and primary songwriter of the rock band Motörhead claimed to have stayed at the castle.

=== Closure and decline ===
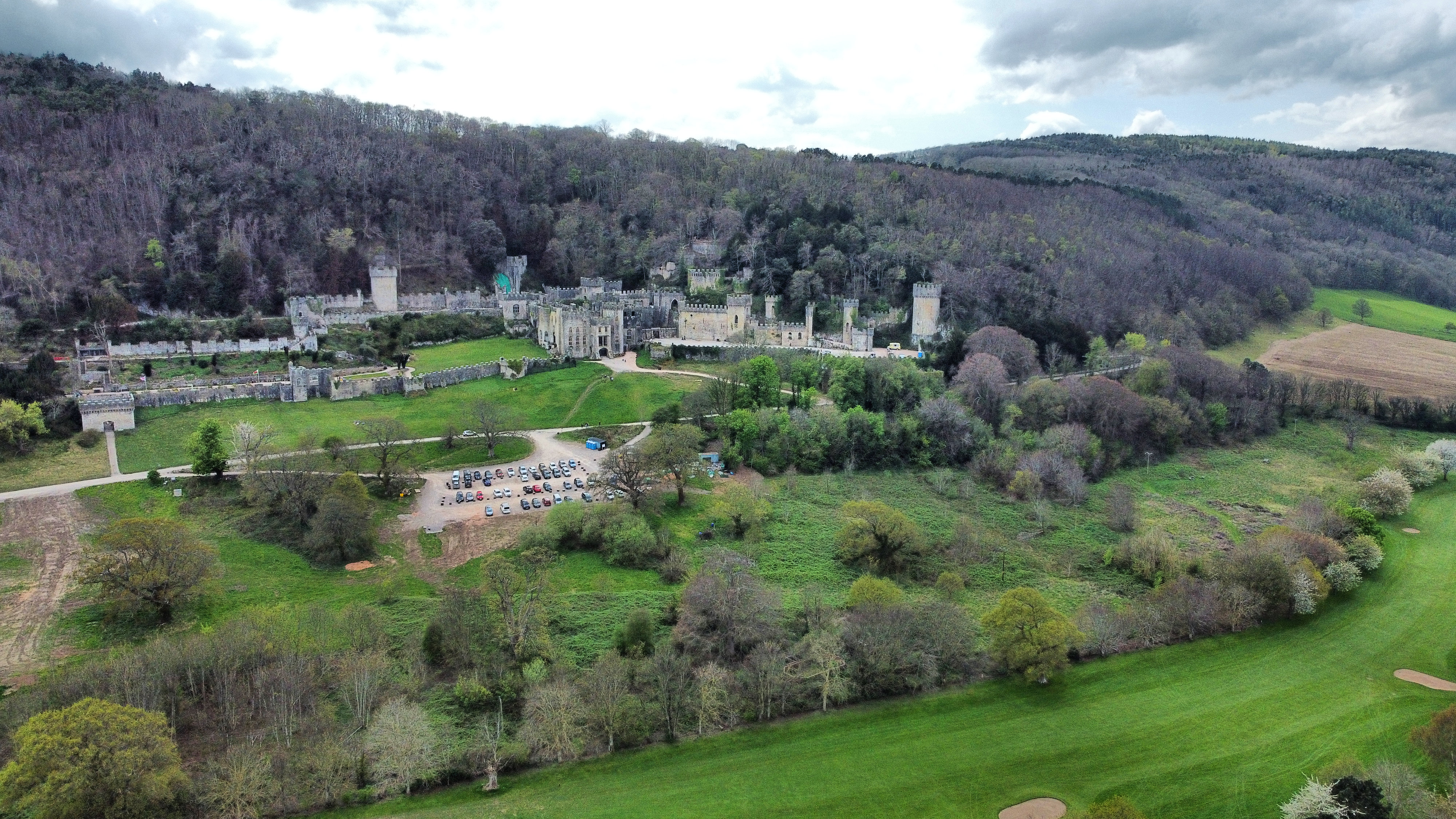
Gwrych Castle and estate in April 2022

In the 1980s the castle attracted motorcyclists from across Britain, and gained notoriety as a venue for drunkenness and antisocial behaviour. The police attended the area frequently to keep the peace. The castle closed to the public in 1987. It was bought in 1989 by Nick Tavaglione, an American businessman, for £750,000. His plans to renovate the building and create a centre for opera were not carried out and the castle was looted and vandalised, becoming little more than a derelict shell.

In the 1990s it was occupied by New Age travellers who "sold off fittings, including fireplaces and stained glass, and stripped the slates and lead from the roof". Later "battlements were toppled from the towers". Also in 1994, arsonists destroyed power-lines by setting an old caravan alight. Years later, in June 2021, a new transformer and pole were installed after the trust had secured enough funds to pay for it.

During Tavaglione's ownership, historian Mark Baker campaigned for the castle's preservation — a campaign that he started when he was twelve years old. Baker was instrumental in forming the Gwrych Castle Preservation Trust, dedicated to ensuring the castle's future. The condition of the property was monitored by the trust, who lobbied Conwy council to compulsorily purchase the property, eventually placing pressure on the American owner, who put it up for sale in March 2006.

Clayton Hotels bought the castle in 2007 for £850,000, after it failed to reach its £1.5m reserve price at auction. They announced a three-year project, costing £6,000,000, to renovate the castle and convert it into a 90-bedroom hotel, creating 100 jobs. The project was subject to planning permission, but had the support of the trust. Clayton Hotels spent about £500,000 on its plans, clearing the site and rebuilding areas, but subsequently went into administration. New developers obtained fresh planning permission in 2012 for another hotel development, but this also failed to progress.

=== Partial recovery ===
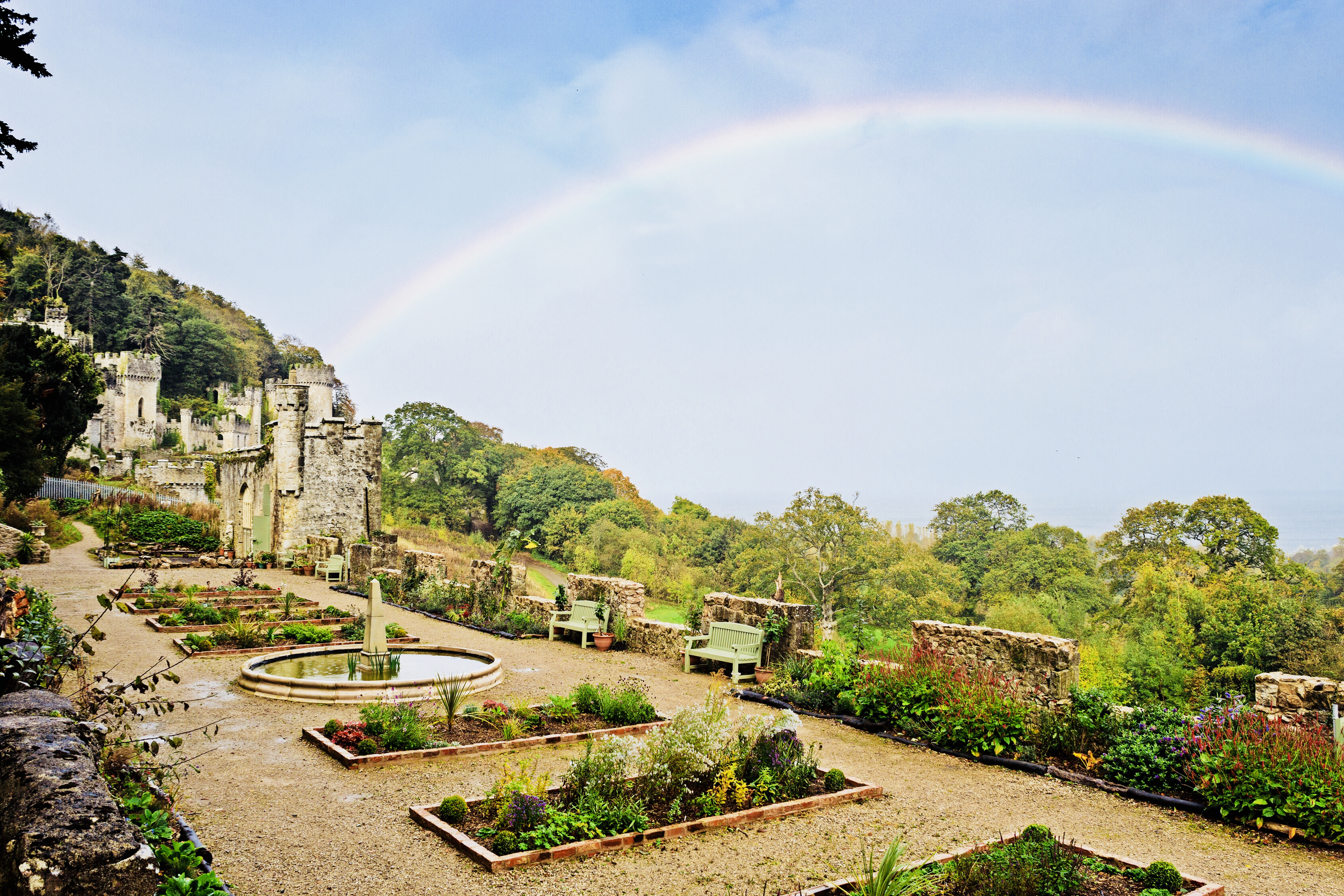
The restored formal gardens at Gwrych Castle. Built in the 1830s they were based on Queen Eleanor's garden at Conwy Castle

In 2018 Gwrych Castle and its estate was sold to Gwrych Castle Preservation Trust, a registered charity, enabled by a grant from the National Heritage Memorial Fund. Some of the estate is leased to Natural Resources Wales for a 999-year term.

The aims of the Gwrych Castle Preservation Trust are: 'to preserve for the benefit of the people of north Wales and of the nation, the historical, architectural and constructional heritage that may exist in and around Gwrych Castle, Abergele, North Wales in buildings (including any building as defined in Section 336 of the Town & Planning Act 1990) of particular beauty or historical, architectural or constructional interest.' Further aims were also explained in a Welsh-language article setting out their hopes to promote Welsh-based crafters, artists, musicians, and other creative avenues; "It's clear which path we want to follow - one that supports Welsh culture."

The castle is open to visitors seven days per week from 10am to 5pm for a fee. The main building remains a ruin and cannot be accessed, but a small number of rooms, some outbuildings, and the castle grounds can be visited. Due to the high cost of repairs and restoring lost content, the trust relies on volunteers and/or philanthropists who contribute their time, experiences, knowledge and skills. From the castle the views are far reaching; the Irish Sea to the north, the Little and Great Ormes near Llandudno to the west, to the east the hill where Castell Cawr is located, Rhyl and Prestatyn, and on good days Liverpool.

Gwyrch Castle is a Grade I listed building. In 2024 the castle was placed in the highest category of risk on Cadw's Buildings at Risk register.

== Architecture ==
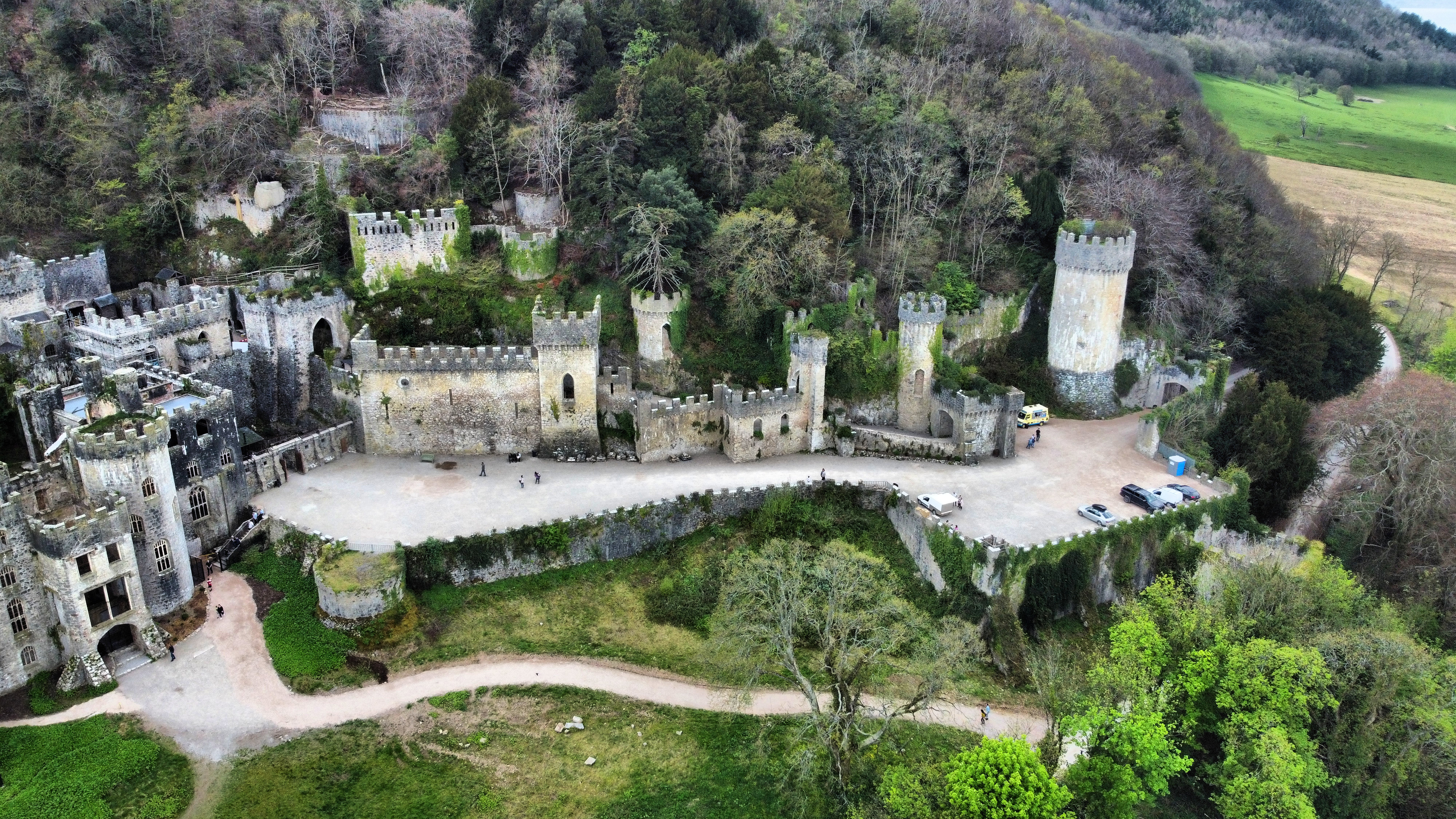
The 18 towers of Gwrych Castle

The Cadw listing entry for the castle describes it as "a magnificent large scale example of a Romantic castellated mansion; particularly important for its relationship with its site and its spectacular and extensive Picturesque composition, one of the finest examples of its date in Britain". Other critics have been less effusive; the historian Jan Morris called Gwrych, "the silliest castle [in Wales], a rich man's fancy".

=== Listing designations ===
Gwrych is a Grade I listed building. The estate is listed at Grade II* on the Cadw/ICOMOS Register of Parks and Gardens of Special Historic Interest in Wales. Many other structures on the wider estate are also listed, some at Grade II*, and some at Grade II: these include a belvedere, Lady Eleanor's Tower, the walls enclosing the estate, some agricultural buildings and a home farm, a much reduced fragment of the original house, and no fewer than six lodges.

== In the media ==
=== Television ===
Michael Portillo visited Gwrych Castle for an episode of Great British Railway Journeys, broadcast in 2018. The castle also featured in BBC One Wales' Hidden Wales in 2018, and in an episode of the series Abandoned Engineering. In February 2020, Gwrych was briefly shown on S4C's subsidiary Hansh, where a Welsh artist and researcher for the trust, Rhŷn Williams, spoke about mental health and using his art as therapy to cope. In November 2020, History Hit host Dan Snow interviewed Mark Baker, who has dedicated his working life to saving the castle.

==== I'm a Celebrity...Get Me Out of Here! ====
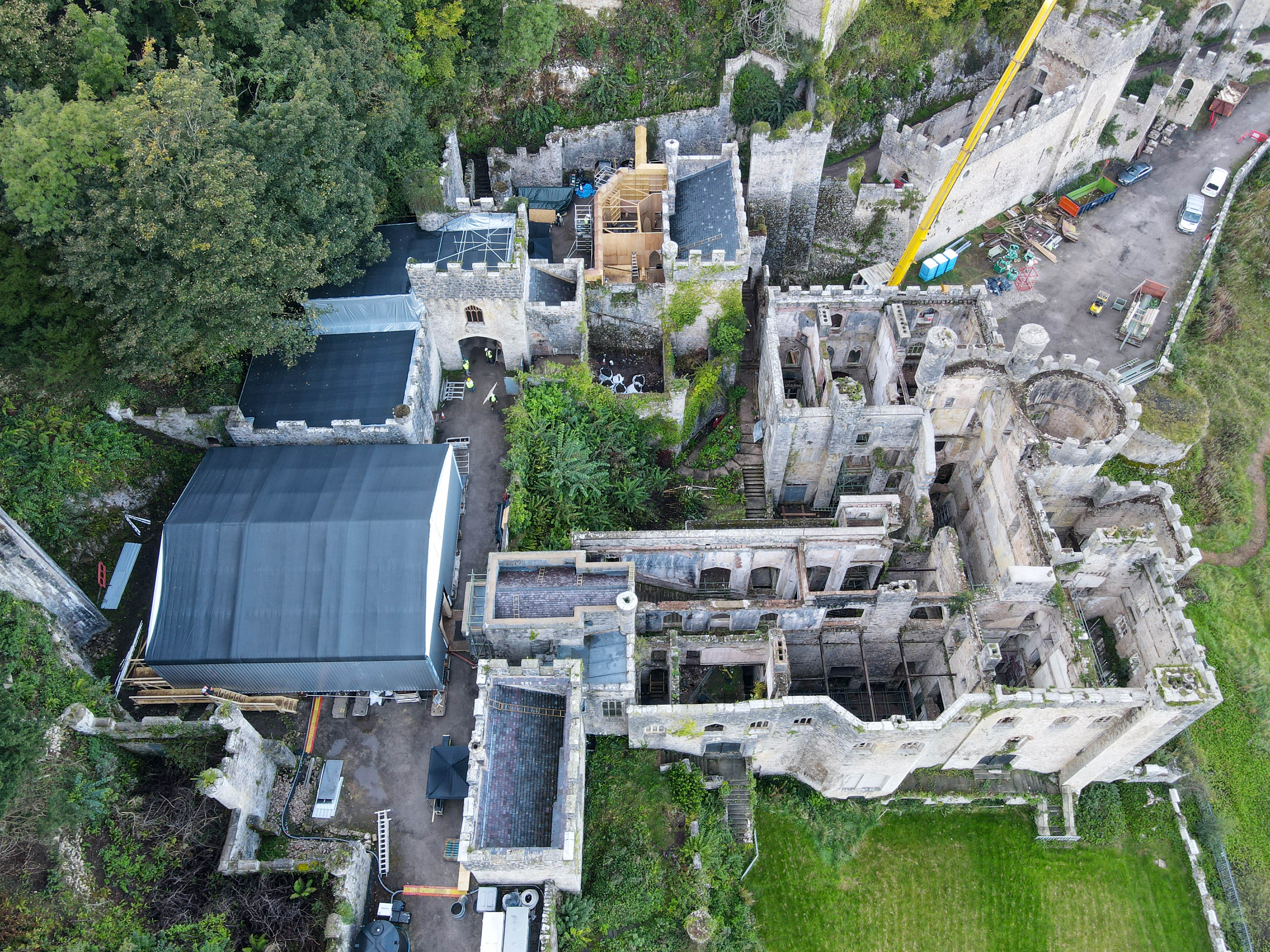
Work on the castle to prepare for I'm a Celebrity filming

In late 2020, Gwrych Castle was used as the location of the twentieth series of ITV's I'm a Celebrity...Get Me Out of Here!. Due to the COVID-19 pandemic, filming in Australia, the usual location for the series, was not possible. Subsequently, in May 2021, with their involvement at the castle, Mark Busk-Cowley, Roy Callow, Steve Kruger, Andy Milligan, James Tinsley and Mathieu Weekes won BAFTA awards for their contribution on the series.

In November 2021, I'm a Celebrity...Get Me Out of Here! returned to the castle for its twenty-first series, however during the first week of shooting Storm Arwen damaged parts of the production facilities at Manorafon Farm Park, 1 km (0.6 miles) east of the castle. As a consequence, the show temporarily ceased filming and producers took the contestants off-set until filming could resume. The castle, however, was unaffected by the winds due to Lloyd Hesketh Bamford-Hesketh's foresight in using Cefn yr Ogof's hill as a wind barrier against the north-westerly winds from the Irish Sea.

=== Films ===
The castle has been used as a location of a number of films including; Holiday on the Buses (1973), Prince Valiant (1997), Dragon Crusaders (2011), and Saint Dracula 3D (2012).

=== Literature ===
The Gwrych Castle Trust Archive and the National Library of Wales hold materials relating to Gwrych, including original plans and designs for the stained-glass windows. Mark Baker has written a number of works about the castle and its occupants, including; Gwrych Castle: A Pictorial History (2000), The rise and fall of Gwrych Castle, Abergele, North Wales: including Winifred, Countess of Dundonald: a biography (2003), and Myths and Legends of the Gwrych Castle Estate: An Archaeological, Historical and Oral History (2006). Andrew Hesketh has written a history of Gwrych Castle’s association with the Kindertransport programme, Escape to Gwrych Castle: A Jewish Refugee Story (2023)

=== Folklore ===
Reports of unexplained sightings in the area of the castle have occasionally appeared in the media.

=== Photography ===
The photographer Tim Walker has used the castle as a location, including for Shoot for the Moon for Vogue, and a campaign in 2021 for Louis Vuitton.

=== Video games ===
In November 2021, in partnership between ITV's I'm a Celebrity...Get Me Out of Here! and John Lewis & Partners, the castle and the show's celebrity trials were made into a downloadable asset to play within the Fortnite franchise.

== Gallery ==
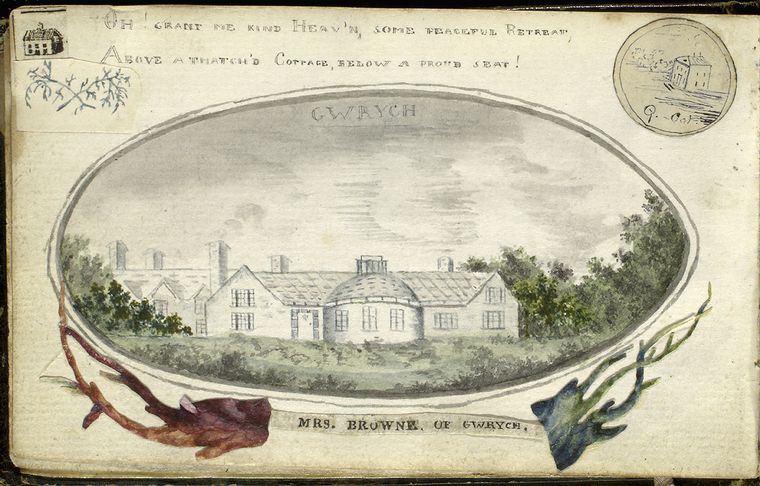
A page of Anne Wagner's scrapbook devoted to Mrs Browne of Gwrych depicting the original medieval building, Plas yn y Gwrych, prior to the erection of the castle, c. 1800

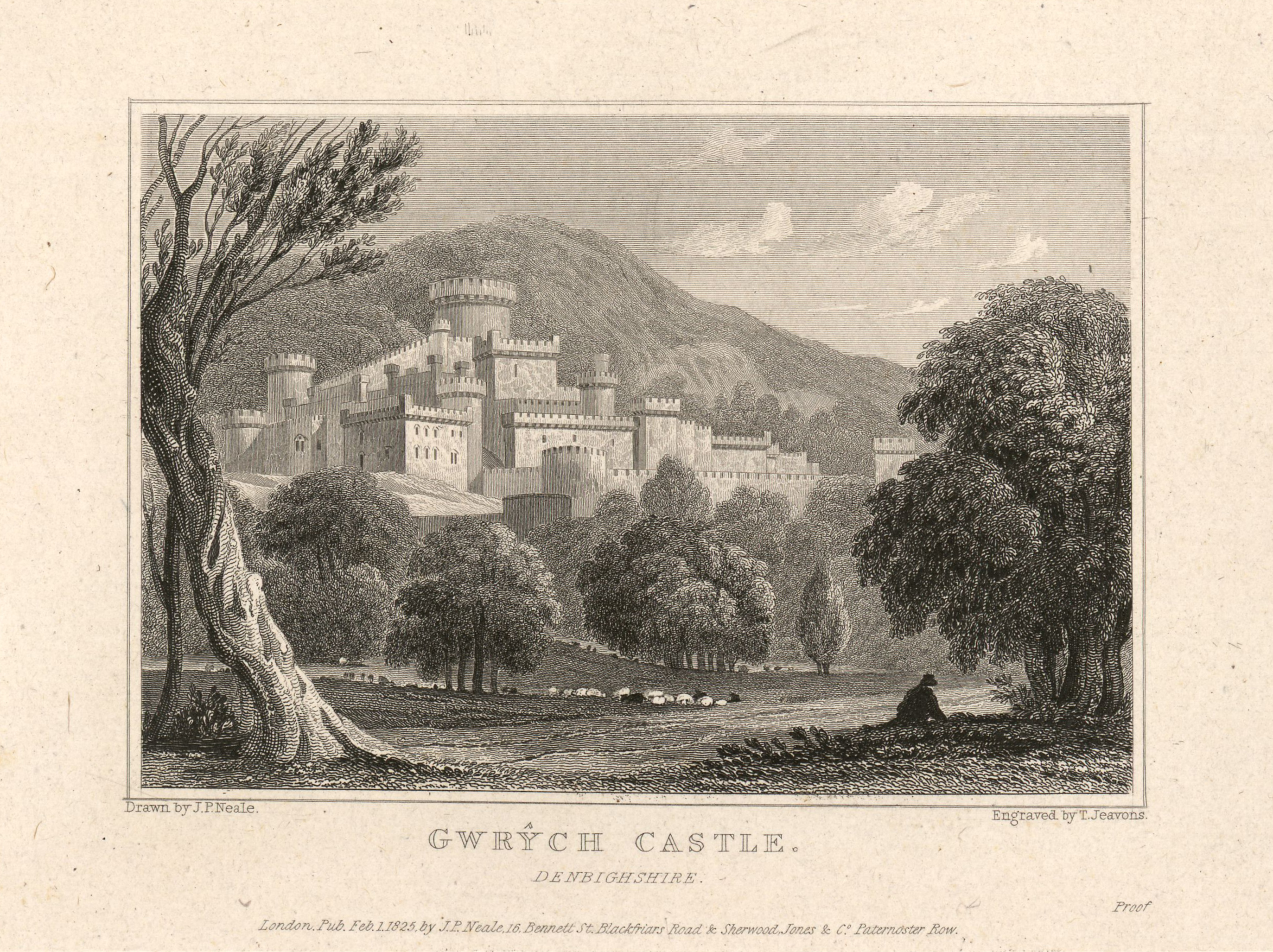
Gwrych Castle in 1825, shortly after the Georgian castellated mansion had been completed

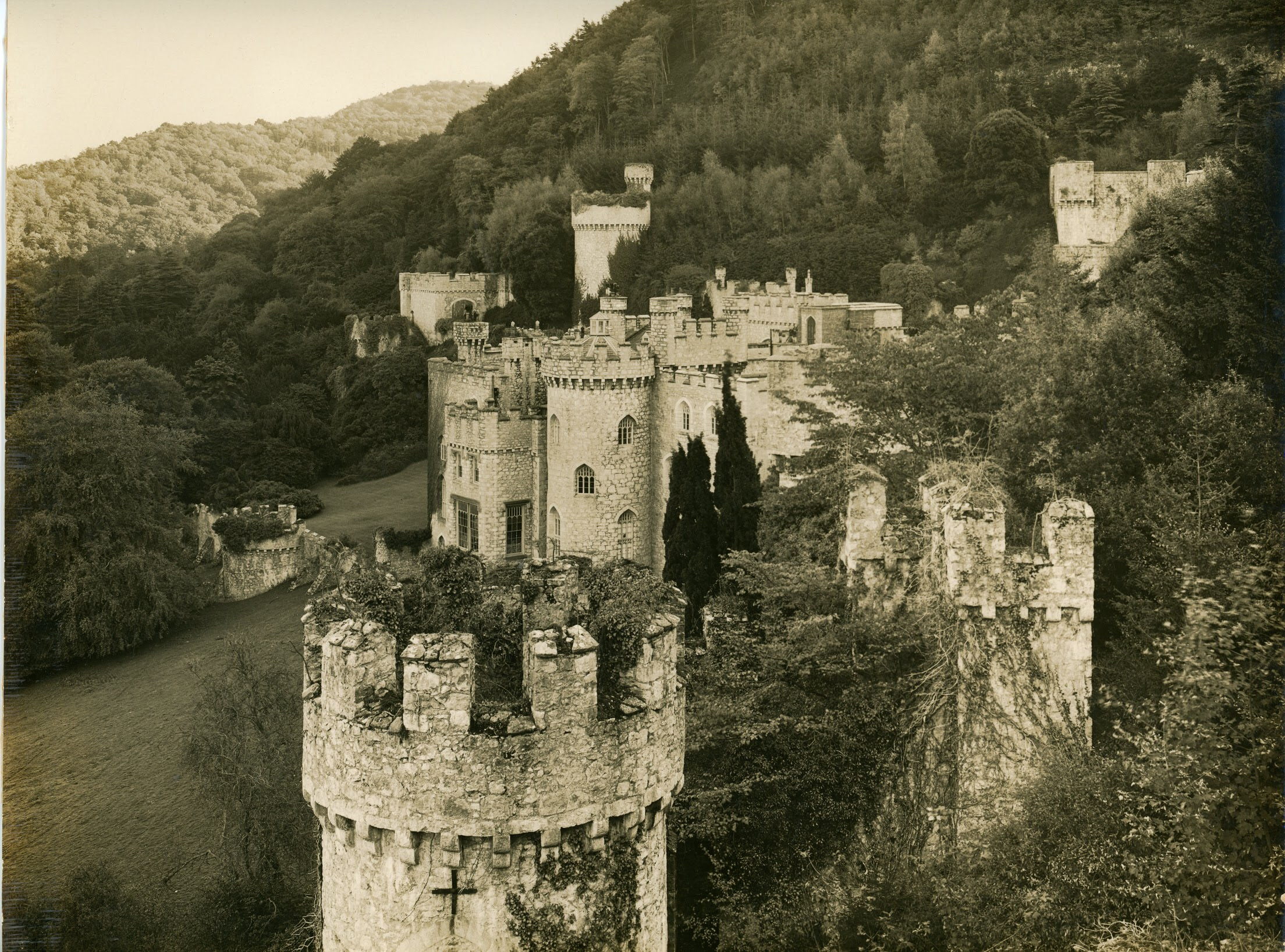
Gwrych Castle in the 1920s, viewed from the Hesketh Tower
