= I'm a Celebrity...Get Me Out of Here! (British TV series) series 21 =

I'm a Celebrity...Get Me Out of Here!
- Series 21
- Presented by: Anthony McPartlin; Declan Donnelly
- No. of days: 20
- No. of castaways: 12
- Winner: Danny Miller
- Runner-up: Simon Gregson
- Location: Gwrych Castle, Abergele, Wales
- No. of episodes: 20

Release
- Original network: ITV
- Original release: 21 November – 12 December 2021

Series chronology
- ← Previous; Series 20 Next → Series 22

I'm a Celebrity...Get Me Out of Here! returned for its twenty-first series on 21 November 2021 on ITV. As with series 20, due to COVID-19 travel restrictions, the series was filmed at Gwrych Castle in Abergele, Wales.

Ant & Dec returned to host the series. In October 2021, it was announced that the online spin-off show I'm a Celebrity...The Daily Drop had been axed, with no plans for a replacement.

On 12 December, Danny Miller was crowned the first ever ‘King of the Castle’.

== Production ==
On 2 August 2021, it was announced that, due to Australia's border remaining closed amid COVID-19 restrictions in the country, filming would again be taking place at Gwrych Castle in Abergele, Wales, instead of Murwillumbah, New South Wales, Australia. As part of the agreement with Gwrych Castle Preservation Trust, ITV announced it would continue to help support the ongoing restoration project of the site.

The first trailer for the series was released on 22 October 2021, featuring Ant & Dec dressed up in knight's armour galloping through the Welsh countryside, whilst it was teased that the series would be "more gruelling than ever".

The live elements of the show on 26 November had to be pre-recorded for the first time in the show's history due to adverse weather conditions from Storm Arwen. On 27 November, the celebrities were temporarily removed from the castle and the episodes on 27, 28 and 29 November were cancelled due to safety fears and technical difficulties as a result of the storm. The show resumed on 30 November.

== Celebrities ==
The line-up was announced on 15 November 2021. Adam Woodyatt and Simon Gregson were confirmed by ITV on 24 November as the annual late arrivals. On 25 November, Richard Madeley was forced to withdraw from the series after being taken to hospital due to an unspecified illness, and therefore breaking the show's COVID bubble. Posting online, Madeley said: "I started to feel briefly unwell in the small hours of the morning and was taken to hospital as a precaution."

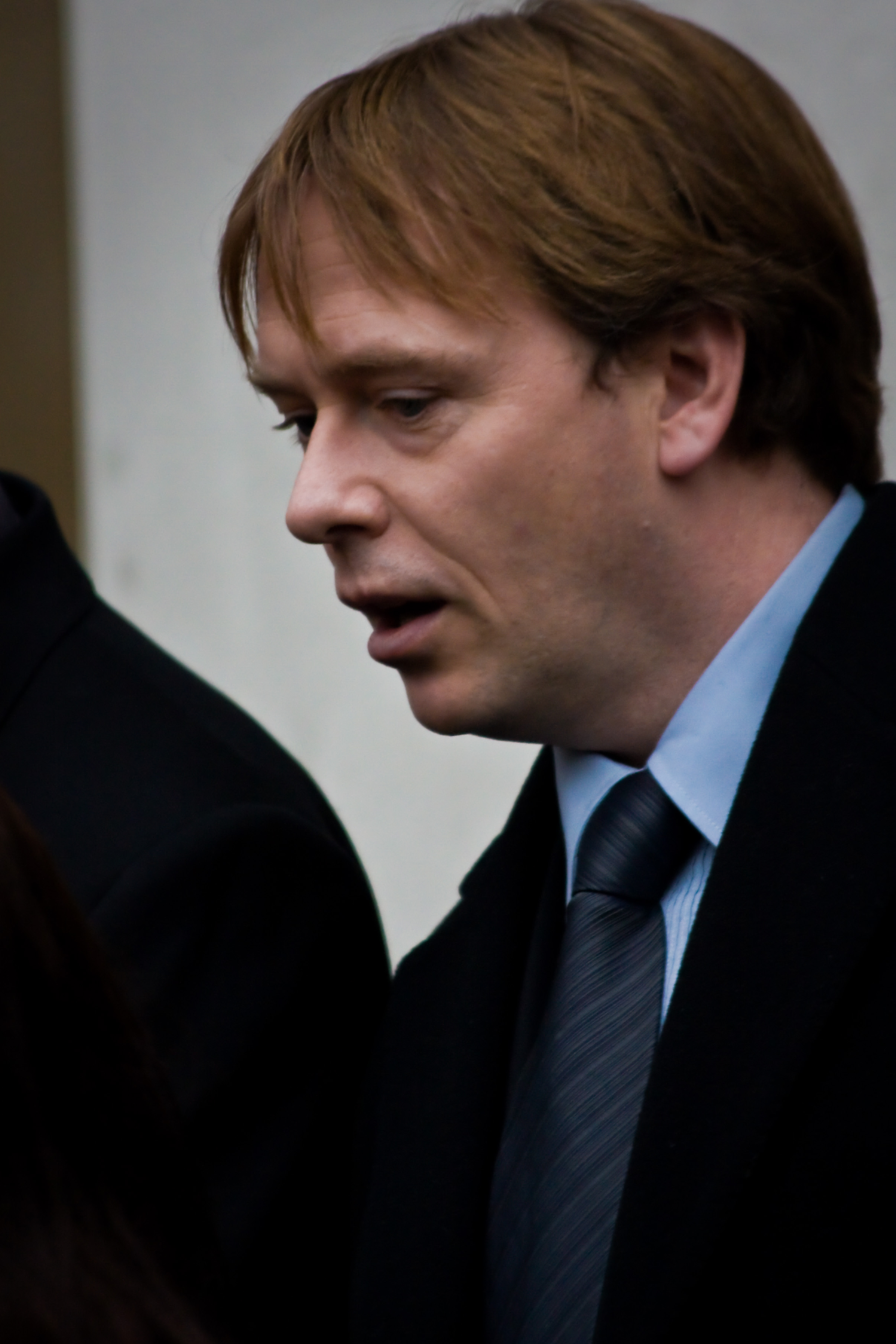
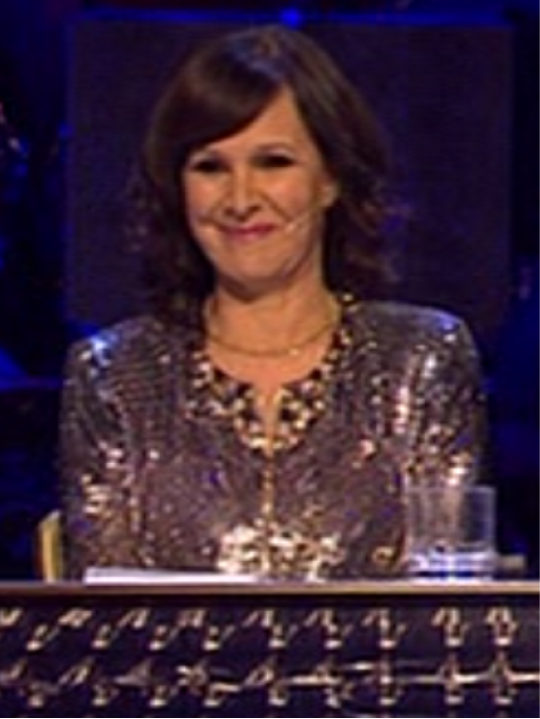
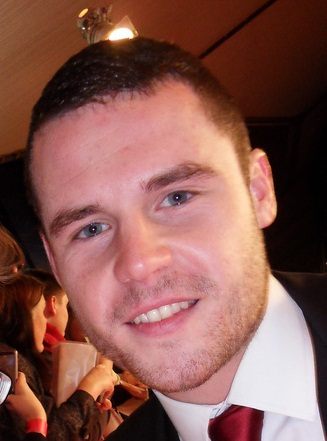
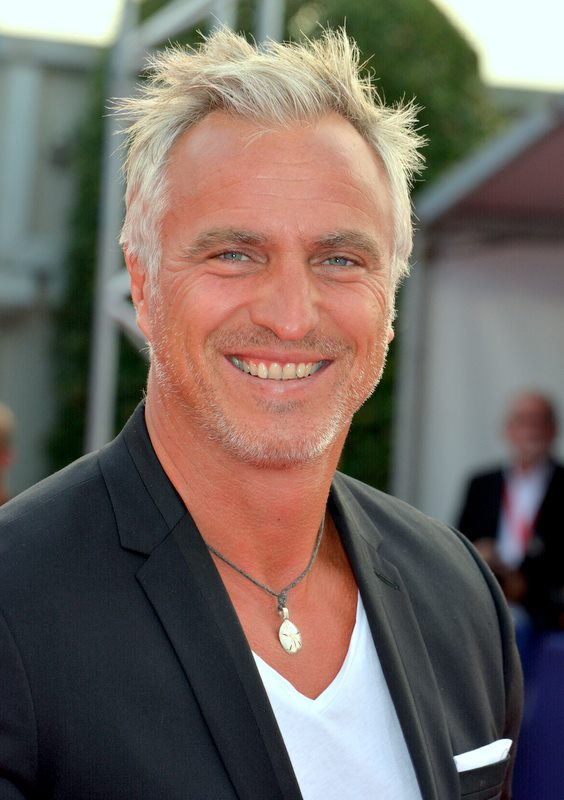
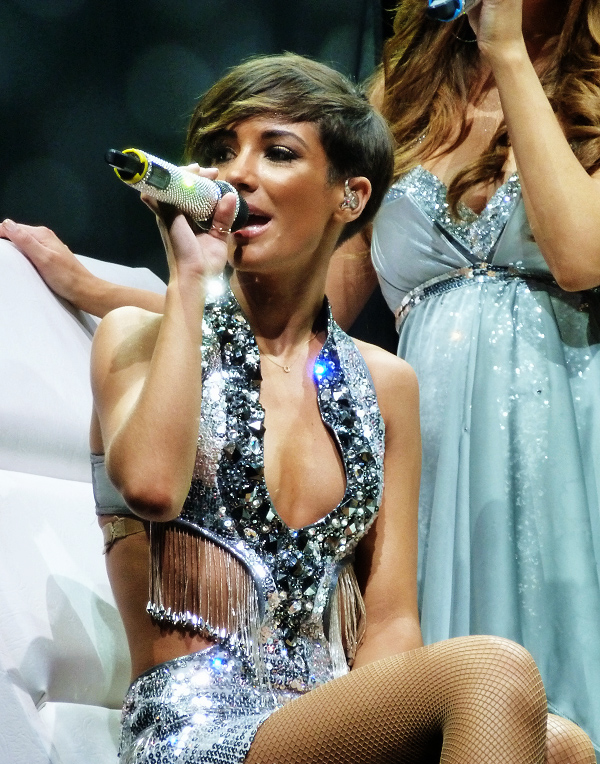
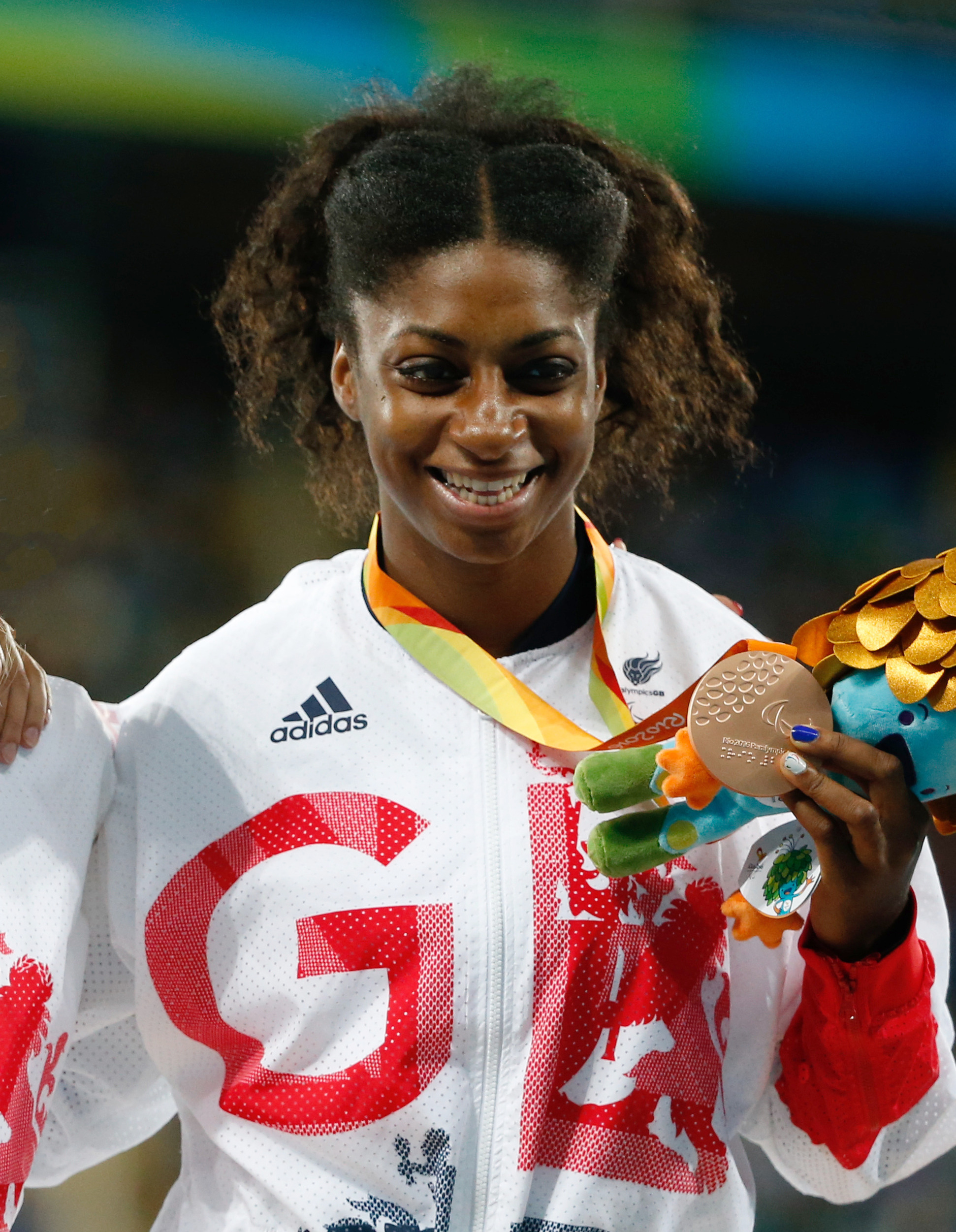
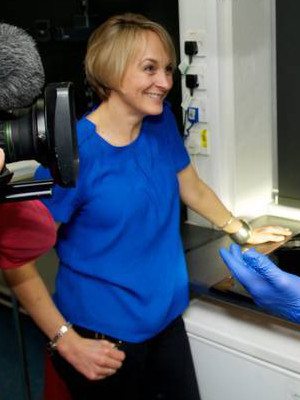
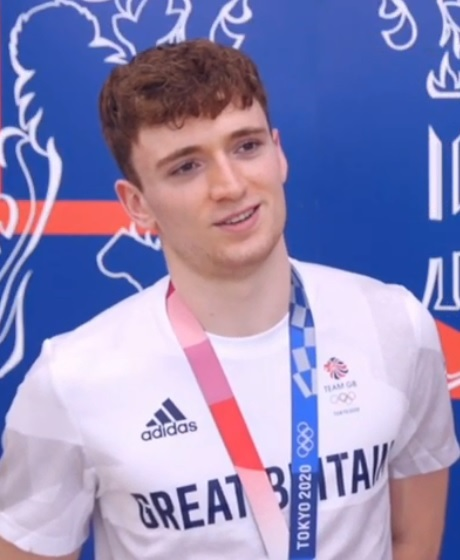
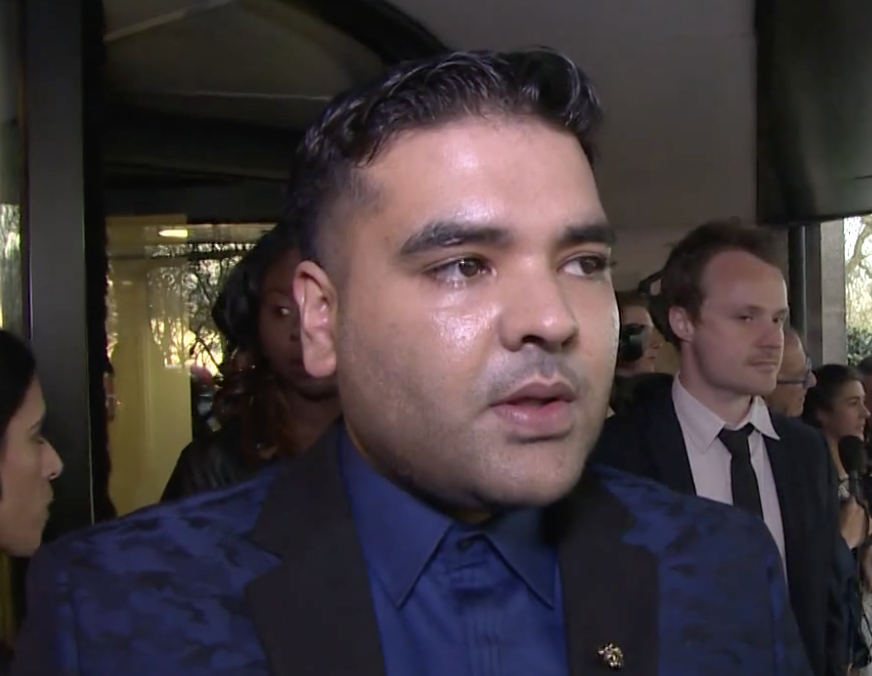
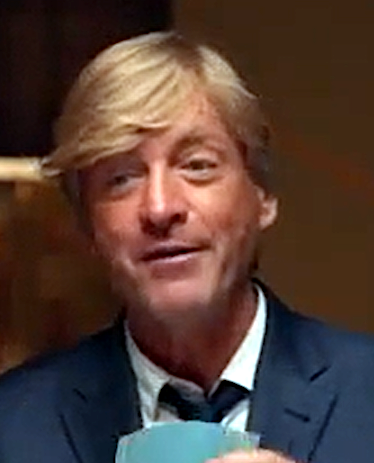
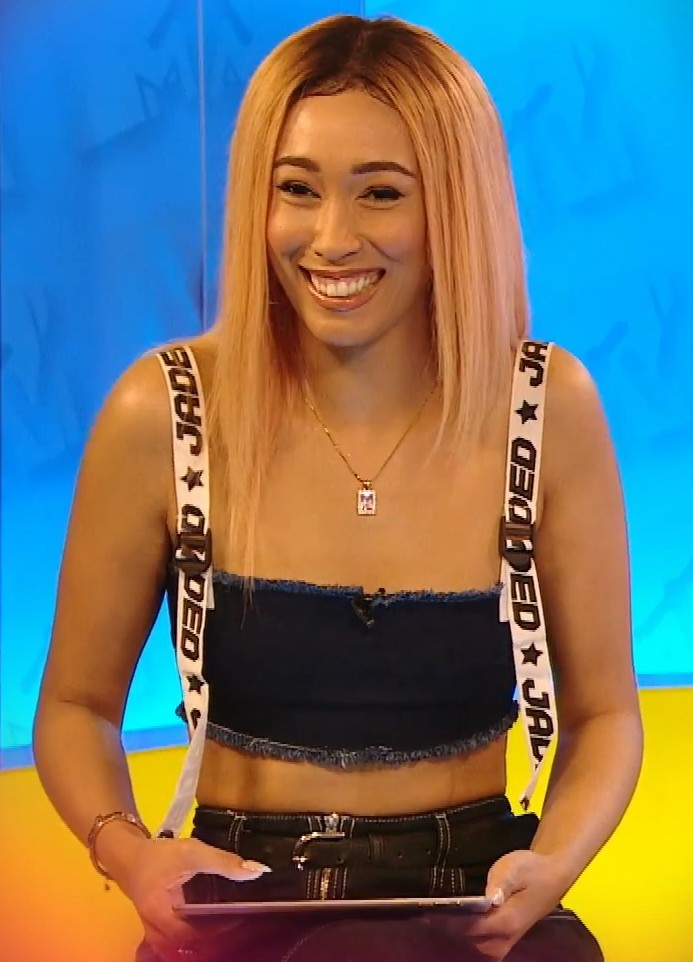
From left to right: Adam Woodyatt, Arlene Phillips, Danny Miller, David Ginola, Frankie Bridge, Kadeena Cox, Louise Minchin, Matty Lee, Naughty Boy, Richard Madeley and Snoochie Shy.
Not pictured: Simon Gregson.

Celebrity	Known for	Status
Danny Miller	Emmerdale actor	Winner on 12 December 2021
Simon Gregson	Coronation Street actor	Runner-up on 12 December 2021
Frankie Bridge	The Saturdays singer & Loose Women panellist	Third place on 12 December 2021
David Ginola	Former France footballer & pundit	Eliminated 8th on 11 December 2021
Matty Lee	Olympic diver	Eliminated 7th on 10 December 2021
Adam Woodyatt	EastEnders actor	Eliminated 6th on 10 December 2021
Louise Minchin	Former BBC Breakfast presenter	Eliminated 5th on 9 December 2021
Naughty Boy	DJ, record producer & musician	Eliminated 4th on 8 December 2021
Snoochie Shy	BBC Radio 1Xtra presenter	Eliminated 3rd on 7 December 2021
Kadeena Cox	Paralympic athlete & cyclist	Eliminated 2nd on 6 December 2021
Arlene Phillips	Choreographer & former Strictly Come Dancing judge	Eliminated 1st on 5 December 2021
Richard Madeley	Television presenter & journalist	Withdrew on 25 November 2021

== Results and elimination ==
Indicates that the celebrity received the most votes from the public
Indicates that the celebrity received the fewest votes and was eliminated immediately (no bottom two)
Indicates that the celebrity was named as being in the bottom two

Daily results per celebrity
Celebrity	Day 13	Day 14	Day 15	Day 16	Day 17	Day 18	Day 19	Day 20		Trials	Castle coin challenges
Celebrity	Day 13	Day 14	Day 15	Day 16	Day 17	Day 18	Day 19	Round 1	Round 2	Trials	Castle coin challenges
Danny	Safe	Safe	Safe	Safe	Safe	Safe	Safe	1st 42.79%	Winner; 55.05%	6	3
Simon	Safe	Safe	Safe	Safe	Safe	Safe	Safe	2nd 33.44%	Runner-up; 44.95%	5	2
Frankie	Safe	Safe	Safe	Safe	Safe	Safe	Safe	3rd 23.77%	Eliminated (Day 20)	5	1
David	Safe	Safe	Safe	Safe	Safe	Safe	4th	Eliminated (Day 19)		4	1
Matty	Safe	Safe	Safe	Safe	Bottom two	5th	Eliminated (Day 18)			4	2
Adam	Safe	Safe	Safe	Bottom two	Safe	6th	Eliminated (Day 18)			3	1
Louise	Safe	Bottom two	Safe	Safe	7th	Eliminated (Day 17)				2	3
Naughty Boy	Safe	Safe	Bottom two	8th	Eliminated (Day 16)					8	2
Snoochie	Bottom two	Safe	9th	Eliminated (Day 15)						3	3
Kadeena	Safe	10th	Eliminated (Day 14)							3	0
Arlene	11th	Eliminated (Day 13)								2	1
Richard	Withdrew (Day 5)									2	0
Notes	None							1			
Bottom two (named in)	Arlene, Snoochie	Kadeena, Louise	Naughty Boy, Snoochie	Adam, Naughty Boy	Louise, Matty	Adam, Matty	None				
Eliminated	Arlene; Fewest votes to save	Kadeena; Fewest votes to save	Snoochie; Fewest votes to save	Naughty Boy; Fewest votes to save	Louise; Fewest votes to save	Adam; Fewest votes to save	David; Fewest votes to save	Frankie; 23.77% to win	Simon; 44.95% to win		
Eliminated	Arlene; Fewest votes to save	Kadeena; Fewest votes to save	Snoochie; Fewest votes to save	Naughty Boy; Fewest votes to save	Louise; Fewest votes to save	Matty; Fewest votes to save	David; Fewest votes to save	Frankie; 23.77% to win	Danny; 55.05% to win		

- ^Note 1: The public voted for who they wanted to win, rather than save.

== Trials ==
The contestants take part in daily trials to earn food. These trials aim to test both physical and mental abilities. The winner is usually determined by the number of stars collected during the trial, with each star representing a meal earned by the winning contestant for their fellow celebrities.

The public voted for who they wanted to face the trial
The contestants decided who would face the trial
The trial was compulsory and neither the public nor celebrities decided who took part

Trial number	Air date	Name of trial	Celebrity participation	Winner/ Win or Loss/ Number of stars	Notes
1	21 November	Walk the Plank	Danny; Louise; Naughty Boy; Snoochie	Louise; Snoochie	—N/a
2	21 November	Hell Holes	Arlene; David; Kadeena; Matty	Kadeena; Matty	—N/a
3	21 November	Turrets of Terror	Frankie; Richard	Frankie	2, 3
4	22 November	Dreaded Diner	Danny	Danny	3 4 5
4	22 November	Dreaded Diner	Snoochie	Danny	3 4 5
5	23 November	Treacherous Traps	Snoochie	Snoochie	3 6
5	23 November	Treacherous Traps	Naughty Boy	Snoochie	3 6
6	24 November	Castle Kitchen Nightmares	Richard	4/10 stars	—N/a
7	25 November	The Scare Fair	Adam; Simon	11/12 stars	—N/a
8	26 November	Creepy Closets	Naughty Boy	11/11 stars	7
9	30 November	Bedchamber of Chills	Arlene; Kadeena	10/11 stars	7
10	1 December	Savage Stakeout	Naughty Boy	11/11 stars	7 8
10	1 December	Savage Stakeout	Adam; Simon	11/11 stars	7 8
11	2 December	Castle Scary-Oke	Frankie; Naughty Boy	10/11 stars	—N/a
12	3 December	Gruesome Gargoyles	Matty; Naughty Boy	10/11 stars	—N/a
13	4 December	Cells of Hell	Adam; David; Naughty Boy	4/11 stars	—N/a
14	5 December	Gross Vegas	Naughty Boy	6/11 stars	9
14	5 December	Gross Vegas	Matty	6/11 stars	9
15	6 December	Critter-Cal Cages	Kadeena; Louise	10/10 stars	—N/a
16	7 December	The Grim Grinder	Frankie	7/9 stars	—N/a
17	8 December	Santa's Grotty Grotto	Danny; Simon	7/8 stars	—N/a
18	9 December	Drawbridge Over Troubled Water	Danny; David	7/7 stars	—N/a
19	10 December	Lethal Latrines	Matty	6/6 stars	—N/a
20	11 December	The Celebrity Cyclone	Danny; David; Frankie; Simon	4/4 stars	—N/a
21	12 December	Fill Your Face	Danny	5/5 stars	—N/a
22	12 December	Frightening Feast	Simon	5/5 stars	—N/a
23	12 December	Tomb of Doom	Frankie	5/5 stars	—N/a

- ^Note 2: For the first time in the show's history, the vote for the first trial opened a week before the series began, with the public deciding who would be facing the first trial. The winning celebrity would move their team into Main Camp, while the losing celebrity's team moved into the Castle Clink - where they slept on the floor and endured cold showers until the camps were merged on Day 4.
- ^Note 3: The celebrities competed in this trial to win meals for their camp, while the losing team spent the night with basic rations of rice and beans.
- ^Note 4: As both Danny and Snoochie completed all 10 dishes (5 each), a tie breaker was needed to decide who would win the trial. As Danny finished his drink first, he won the trial.
- ^Note 5: As punishment for losing the first trial, the team in the Castle Clink faced the public vote for this trial. The team in Main Camp chose who faced the trial for them.
- ^Note 6: Main Camp faced the public vote for this trial, then they selected who faced them from the Castle Clink.
- ^Note 7: As lords of the castle, Adam and Simon were exempt from the public vote for trials.
- ^Note 8: Naughty Boy was chosen by the public to compete in the trial, whilst lords of the castle Adam and Simon were told they would participate also.
- ^Note 9: Matty automatically faced this trial after selecting the coin in the Wishing Well challenge.

== Star count ==
Celebrity	Number of stars earned	Percentage
Danny Miller	23/24 stars	95%
Simon Gregson	38/40 stars	95%
Frankie Bridge	26/29 stars	89%
David Ginola	15/22 stars	68%
Matty Lee	22/28 stars	78%
Adam Woodyatt	26/34 stars	76%
Louise Minchin	10/10 stars	100%
Naughty Boy	52/66 stars	79%
Snoochie Shy	10/10 stars	100%
Kadeena Cox	20/21 stars	95%
Arlene Phillips	10/11 stars	91%
Richard Madeley	4/10 stars	40%

== Castle Coin challenges ==
As well as competing in the trials, celebrities have to complete 'Castle Coin Challenges' in order to earn treats for themselves. At least 2 celebrities will be chosen to compete in the challenge. They must complete the challenge they have been given in order to win 'Castle Coins'. After completion of the challenge, the celebrities will take the Castle Coins and head to the Ye Olde Shoppe, where they will purchase one of two snack options, from Kiosk Cledwyn. But, before they are allowed to take the prize, the other celebrities back at the living quarters must answer a question, based on a recent survey. If they get the question right, they will earn the treat, but if they get it wrong, the celebrities will go back empty handed.

The celebrities got the question correct
The celebrities got the question wrong
No challenge or questions were given.

Episode	Air date	Celebrities	Prizes available	Prize chosen	Notes
4	24 November	Danny; Louise	Fried Egg Sweets; Mini Scotch Eggs	Mini Scotch Eggs	—N/a
5	25 November	Frankie; Naughty Boy	Ready Salted Crisps; Flapjacks	Flapjacks	—N/a
6	26 November	Danny; Matty; Snoochie	Cheese & Onion Crisps; Fruit Pastilles; Jaffa Cakes; Half a Chocolate Orange; Biscoff Biscuits; Cheese & Biscuits	Fruit Pastilles; Half a Chocolate Orange; Biscoff Biscuits; Cheese & Biscuits	10
7	30 November	David; Louise	Apple Pie; Twiglets	Apple Pie	—N/a
8	1 December	Danny; Snoochie	Fruit & Nut Mix; Sweet Popcorn	Sweet Popcorn	—N/a
10	3 December	Arlene; Simon	Gingerbread Men; Mini Eggs	Mini Eggs	—N/a
14	7 December	Naughty Boy; Snoochie	Mince Pies; Cheese and Pineapple	Mince Pies	—N/a
15	8 December	Louise; Simon	Letters From Home; Bread and Butter	David & Adam's Letters From Home	—N/a
17	10 December	Adam; Matty	Sausage Rolls; Marshmallows	Marshmallows	—N/a

- ^Note 10: Danny, Matty and Snoochie were chosen to compete in a challenge to win 20 Castle Coins. After completing the challenge, instead of visiting Ye Olde Shoppe and having to answer a question, lords of the castle Adam and Simon were given a list of treats to choose from, each costing 5 Castle Coins each.

== Ratings ==
Official ratings are taken from BARB, utilising the four-screen dashboard which includes viewers who watched the programme on laptops, smartphones, and tablets within 7 days of the original broadcast.

Episode	Air date	Official rating (millions incl. HD & +1)	Weekly rank for all UK TV channels
1	21 November	11.05	1
2	22 November	9.74	2
3	23 November	9.09	5
4	24 November	8.41	7
5	25 November	8.43	6
6	26 November	7.91	8
7	30 November	7.65	3
8	1 December	7.32	4
9	2 December	6.68	6
10	3 December	6.51	7
11	4 December	6.44	8
12	5 December	6.90	5
13	6 December	7.04	5
14	7 December	6.76	8
15	8 December	6.90	7
16	9 December	6.94	6
17	10 December	6.37	10
18	11 December	6.71	9
19	12 December	7.79	4
Series average	2021	7.61	—N/a
