= I'm a Celebrity...Get Me Out of Here! (British TV series) series 20 =

I'm a Celebrity...Get Me Out of Here!
- Series 20
- Presented by: Anthony McPartlin; Declan Donnelly
- No. of days: 20
- No. of castaways: 12
- Winner: Giovanna Fletcher
- Runner-up: Jordan North
- Location: Gwrych Castle, Abergele, Wales
- Companion show: I'm a Celebrity...The Daily Drop
- No. of episodes: 19

Release
- Original network: ITV
- Original release: 15 November – 4 December 2020

Series chronology
- ← Previous; Series 19 Next → Series 21

I'm a Celebrity...Get Me Out of Here! returned for its twentieth series on 15 November 2020 on ITV. Due to the COVID-19 travel restrictions, the series was not filmed in Australia for the first time in the show's history, but was instead filmed at Gwrych Castle in Abergele, Wales.

Ant & Dec returned to host the series. In January 2020, it was announced that I'm a Celebrity: Extra Camp had been axed. In October 2020, it was announced that Vick Hope would present a new online spin-off entitled I'm a Celebrity...The Daily Drop that would also be repeated on ITV2.

On 4 December 2020, the series was won by Giovanna Fletcher, with Jordan North finishing as the runner-up. Fletcher won the show with 50.27% of the final vote, making it the closest ever voting percentage between the final two campmates.

Beverley Callard and Mo Farah would return to the series six years later to participate in the second series of I'm a Celebrity... South Africa, alongside other celebrities to try become the second I'm a Celebrity legend. Callard would finish in 9th place after being forced to withdraw for medical reasons. Farah would finish runner-up to season 16 campmate Adam Thomas.

== Filming location ==
On 7 August 2020, it was announced that, due to the COVID-19 travel restrictions, filming would be taking place at Gwrych Castle in Abergele, Wales, instead of Murwillumbah, New South Wales, Australia.

As part of the agreement with Gwrych Castle Preservation Trust, ITV announced that it would help support the ongoing restoration project of the site, donating money to the trust for the use of the site for four months, as well as paying for additional emergency restoration work.

On 23 October 2020, Wales entered into a circuit breaker lockdown, which led many to speculate that the series could face delays or cancellation. However, on 20 October, it was confirmed that pre-production of the series, and filming of the series itself, would be permitted to go ahead, provided local coronavirus protocols were followed.

=== Reaction to relocation ===
Initial reactions to the new filming locations were mixed, with fans expression confusion and amusement as to how various aspects of the show would be translated into a Welsh setting.

On 2 September 2020, Vale of Clwyd MP James Davies and Prime Minister Boris Johnson both welcomed the relocation during a session of Prime Minister's Questions.

In the weeks leading up to filming, many local residents complained of the close proximity of the filming location to residential areas, particularly as public paths near Gwrych Castle were closed for privacy and security reasons.

Once the series began, viewers reacted positively to the new location. Journalist Katie Archer from Radio Times suggested that the relocation to Gwrych Castle become a permanent feature as a way of refreshing the format.

== Celebrities ==
The line-up was announced on 8 November 2020 during I'm a Celebrity: A Jungle Story.

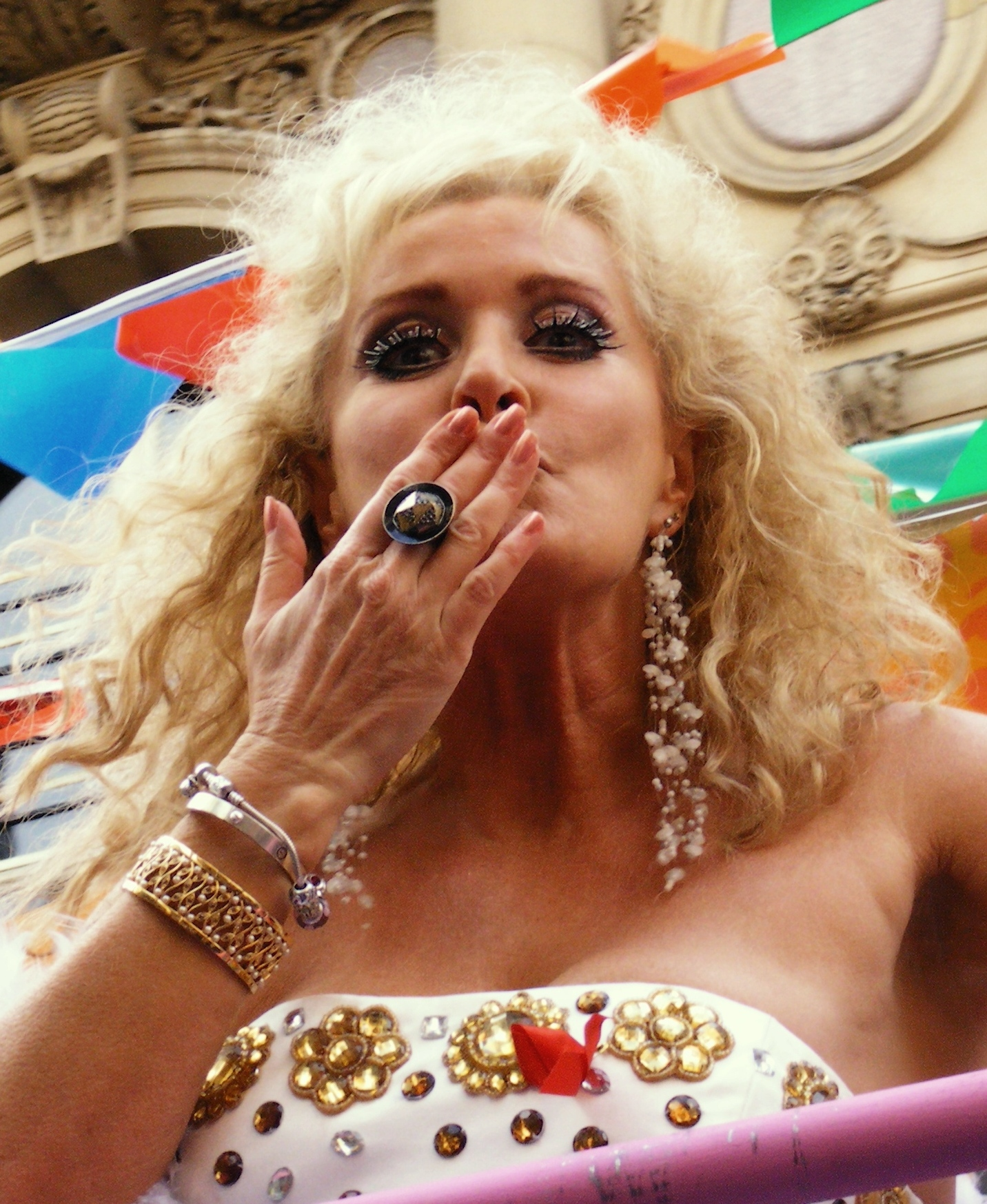
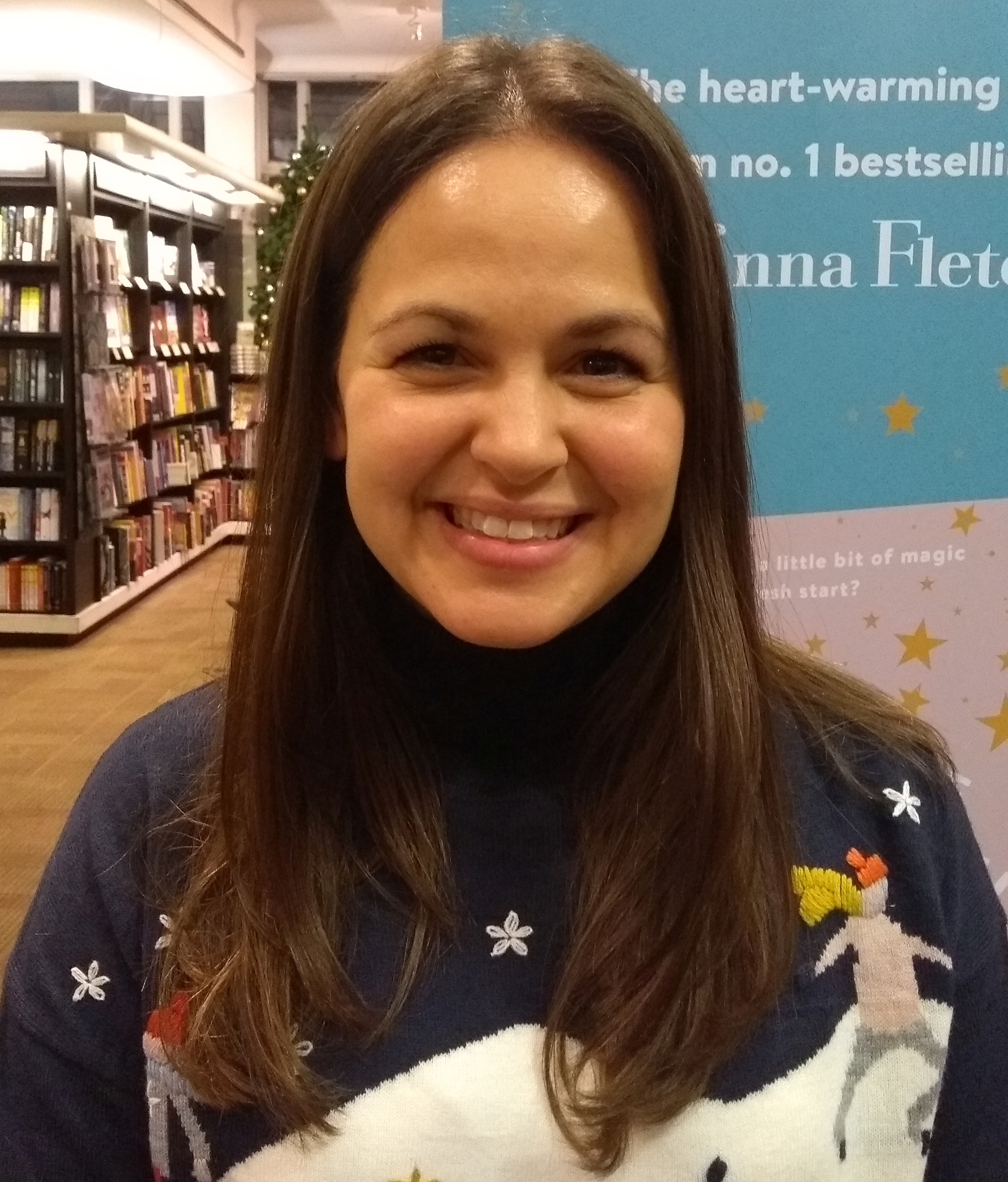
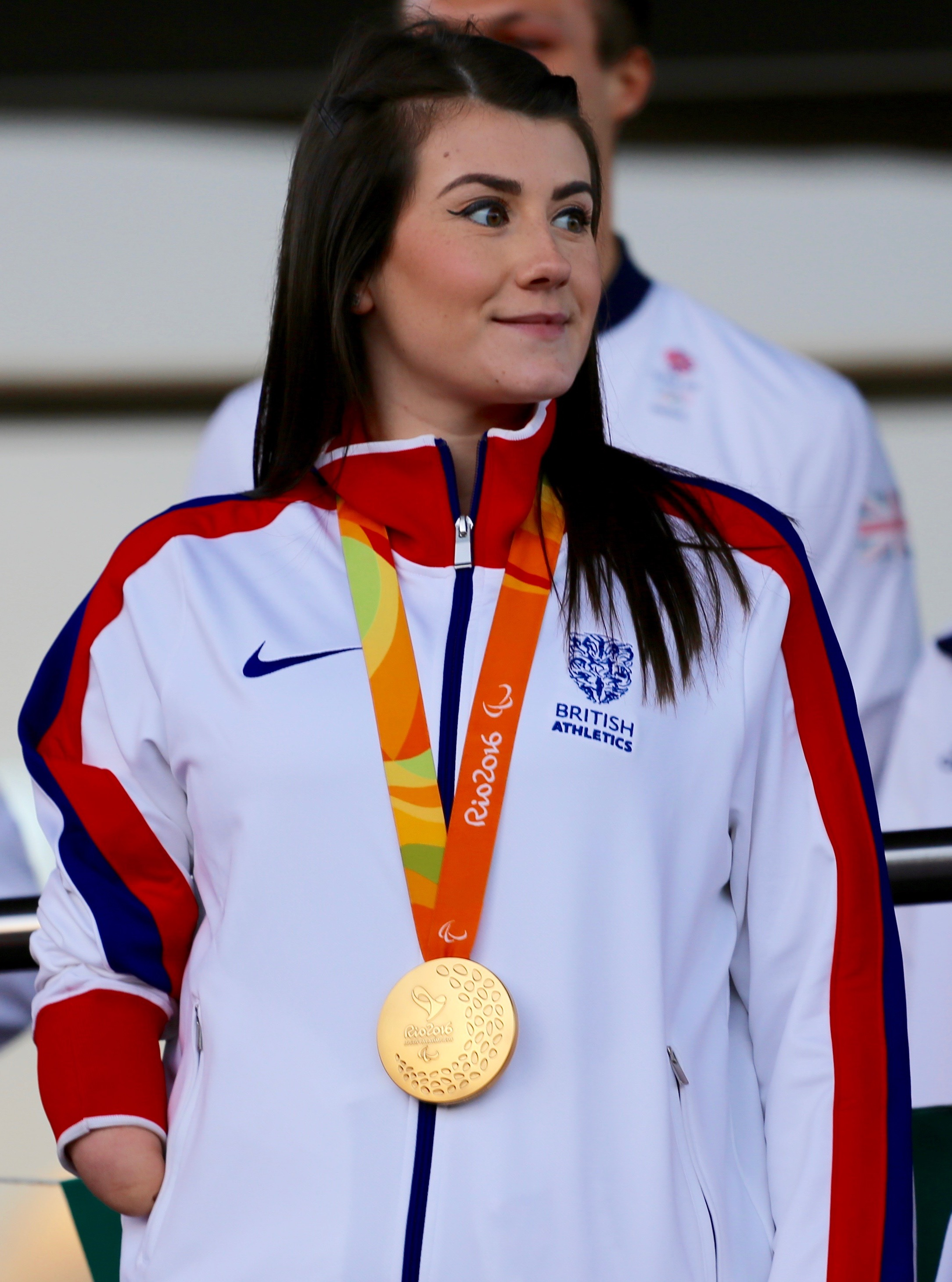
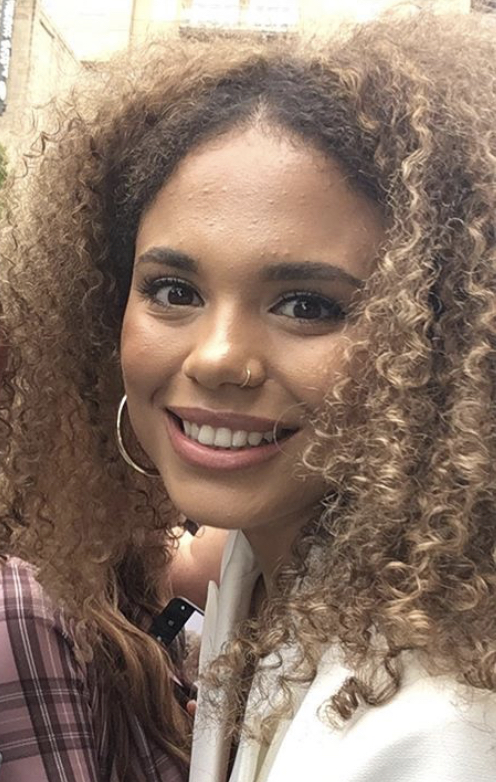
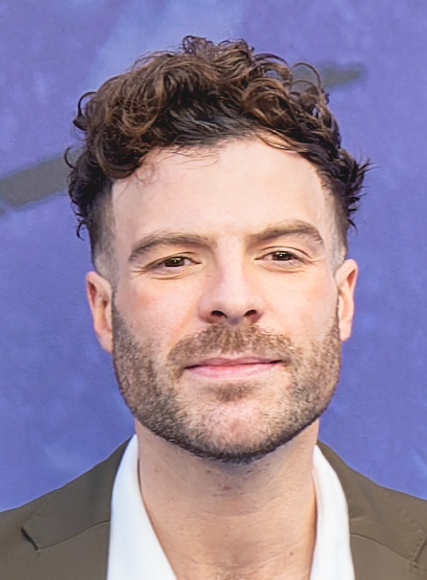
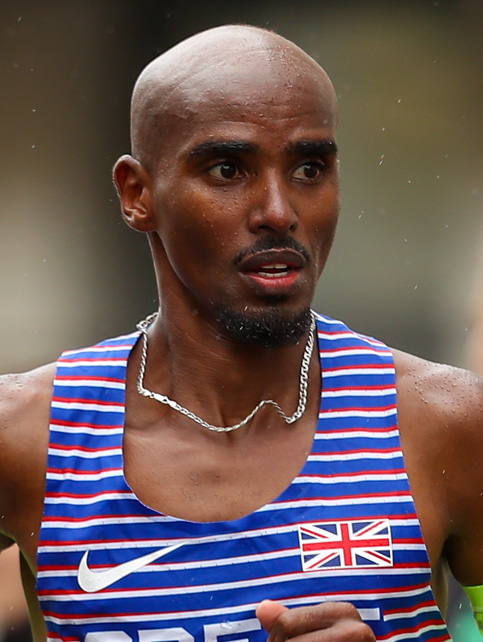
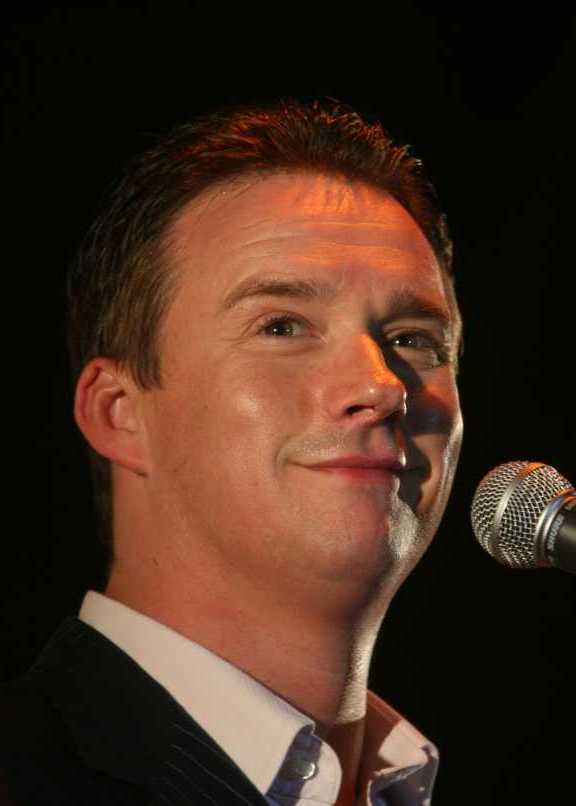
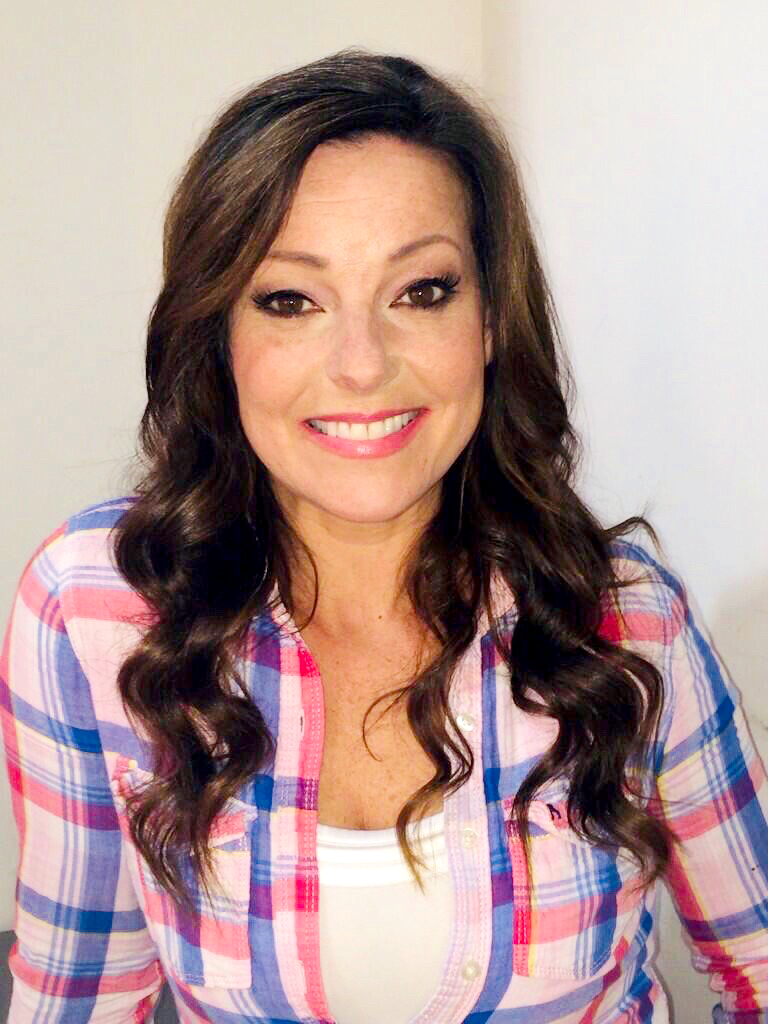
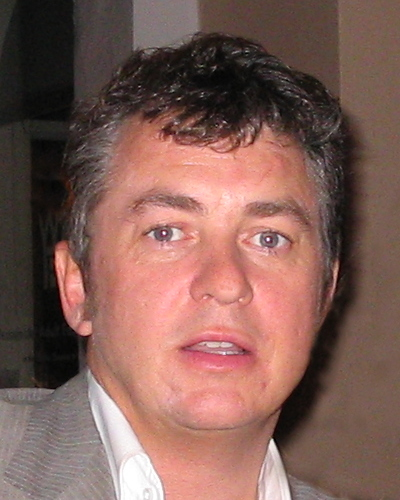
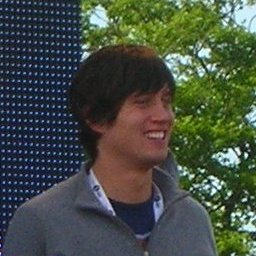
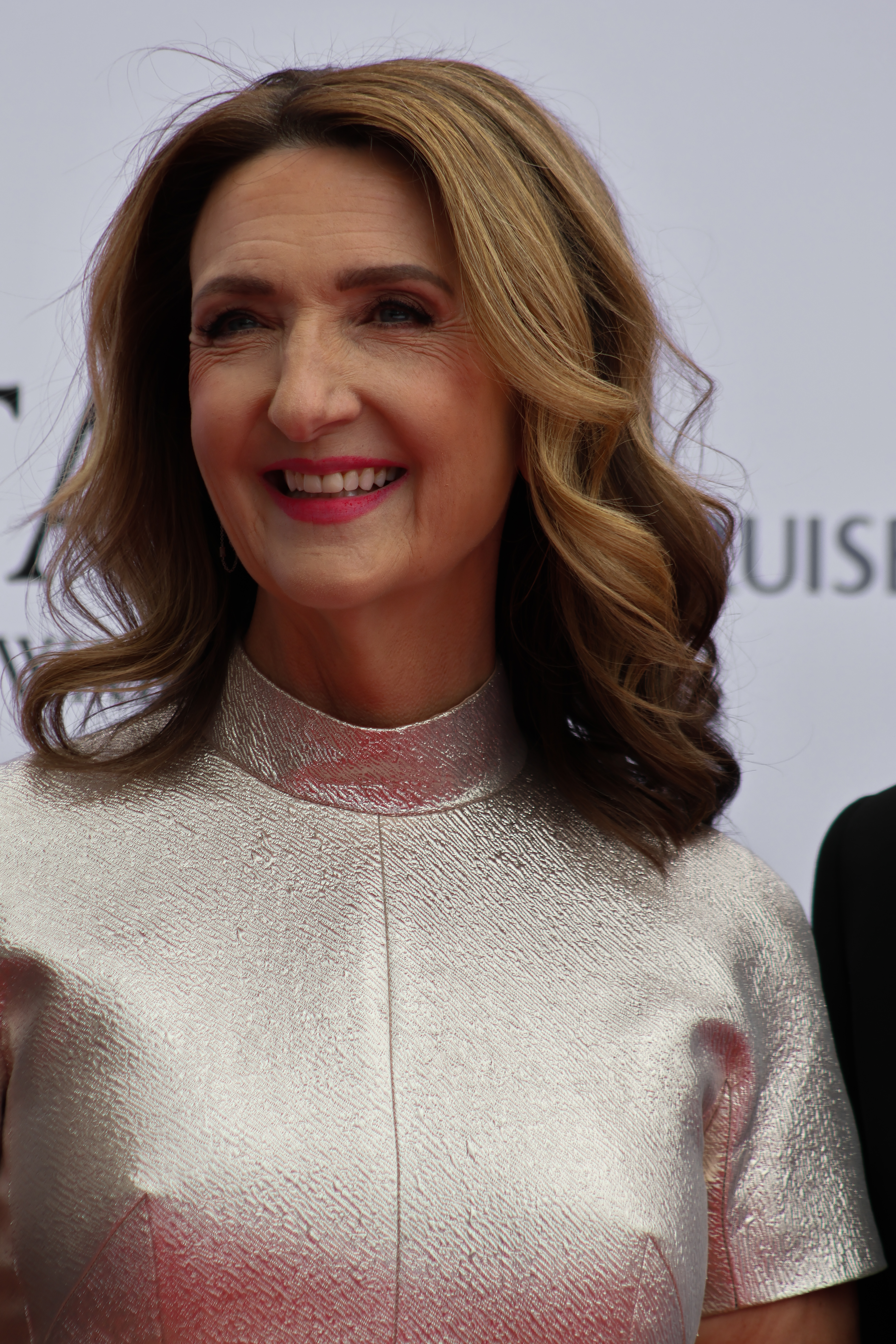
From left to right: Beverley Callard, Giovanna Fletcher, Hollie Arnold, Jessica Plummer, Jordan North, Mo Farah, Russell Watson, Ruthie Henshall, Shane Richie, Vernon Kay and Victoria Derbyshire.
Not pictured: AJ Pritchard.

Celebrity	Known for	Status
Giovanna Fletcher	Author, presenter & blogger	Winner on 4 December 2020
Jordan North	BBC Radio 1 presenter	Runner-up on 4 December 2020
Vernon Kay	Television & radio presenter	Third place on 4 December 2020
Shane Richie	Former EastEnders actor	Eliminated 9th on 3 December 2020
Mo Farah	Olympic long-distance runner & track athlete	Eliminated 8th on 2 December 2020
AJ Pritchard	Former Strictly Come Dancing professional	Eliminated 7th on 2 December 2020
Jessica Plummer	Former EastEnders actress & Neon Jungle singer	Eliminated 6th on 1 December 2020
Russell Watson	Operatic tenor	Eliminated 5th on 1 December 2020
Beverley Callard	Coronation Street actress	Eliminated 4th on 30 November 2020
Victoria Derbyshire	Journalist & television presenter	Eliminated 3rd on 30 November 2020
Ruthie Henshall	Musical theatre actress & singer	Eliminated 2nd on 29 November 2020
Hollie Arnold	Paralympic javelin thrower	Eliminated 1st on 27 November 2020

== Results and elimination ==
Indicates that the celebrity received the most votes from the public.
Indicates that the celebrity received the fewest votes and was eliminated immediately (no bottom two/three)
Indicates that the celebrity was named as being in the bottom two/three

Daily results per celebrity
Celebrity	Day 13	Day 15	Day 16	Day 17	Day 18	Day 19	Day 20		Trials	Castle coin challenges
Celebrity	Day 13	Day 15	Day 16	Day 17	Day 18	Day 19	Round 1	Round 2	Trials	Castle coin challenges
Giovanna	Safe	Safe	Safe	Safe	Safe	Safe	1st 39.45%	Winner; 50.27%	7	4
Jordan	Safe	Safe	Safe	Safe	Safe	Safe	2nd 34.06%	Runner-up; 49.73%	8	2
Vernon	Safe	Safe	Safe	Safe	Safe	Safe	3rd 26.50%	Eliminated (Day 20)	7	3
Shane	Safe	Safe	Safe	Safe	Safe	4th	Eliminated (Day 19)		9	3
Mo	Safe	Safe	Safe	Safe	5th	Eliminated (Day 18)			5	3
AJ	Safe	Safe	Safe	Safe	6th	Eliminated (Day 18)			6	2
Jessica	Safe	Safe	Safe	7th	Eliminated (Day 17)				6	3
Russell	Safe	Safe	Bottom three	8th	Eliminated (Day 17)				3	1
Beverley	Safe	Bottom two	9th	Eliminated (Day 16)					5	3
Victoria	Safe	Safe	10th	Eliminated (Day 16)					5	2
Ruthie	Bottom two	11th	Eliminated (Day 15)						3	2
Hollie	12th	Eliminated (Day 13)							5	2
Notes	None						1			
Bottom two/three (named in)	Hollie, Ruthie	Beverley, Ruthie	Beverley, Russell, Victoria	Jessica, Russell	AJ, Mo	None				
Eliminated	Hollie; Fewest votes to save	Ruthie; Fewest votes to save	Victoria; Fewest votes to save	Russell; Fewest votes to save	AJ; Fewest votes to save	Shane; Fewest votes to save	Vernon; 26.50% to win	Jordan; 49.73% to win		
Eliminated	Hollie; Fewest votes to save	Ruthie; Fewest votes to save	Beverley; Fewest votes to save	Jessica; Fewest votes to save	Mo; Fewest votes to save	Shane; Fewest votes to save	Vernon; 26.50% to win	Giovanna; 50.27% to win		

- ^Note 1: The public voted for who they wanted to win, rather than save.

== Trials ==
The contestants take part in daily trials to earn food. These trials aim to test both physical and mental abilities. The winner is usually determined by the number of stars collected during the trial, with each star representing a meal earned by the winning contestant for their fellow celebrities.

The public voted for who they wanted to face the trial
The contestants decided who would face the trial
The trial was compulsory and neither the public nor celebrities decided who took part

Trial number	Air date	Name of trial	Celebrity participation	Winners/ Number of stars	Notes
1	15 November	The Cliff Climb	AJ; Beverley; Giovanna; Hollie; Jessica; Jordan; Mo; Shane; Vernon; Victoria	10/10 stars	1
2	15 November	The Gates to Hell	AJ; Beverley; Giovanna; Hollie; Jessica; Jordan; Mo; Shane; Vernon; Victoria	7/10 stars	—N/a
3	16 November	The Viper Vault	Jordan; Shane	9/10 stars	—N/a
4	17 November	Frights of the Round Table	Beverley; Jordan; Vernon	10/10 stars	—N/a
5	18 November	Stage Fright	Russell; Ruthie	11/12 stars	—N/a
6	19 November	Trapped Door	Jordan	12/12 stars	—N/a
7	20 November	Fort Locks	Mo	9/12 stars	—N/a
8 (Live)	20 November	The Royal Tournament	AJ; Beverley; Giovanna; Hollie; Jessica; Jordan; Mo; Russell; Ruthie; Shane; Vernon; Victoria	AJ; Jordan; Mo; Russell; Shane; Vernon	2
9	22 November	Bar-Baric	Beverley; Giovanna; Hollie; Jessica; Ruthie; Victoria	10/12 stars	3
10	23 November	Harm-Ory	AJ; Jessica	6/12 stars	—N/a
11	24 November	Cruel Jewels	Shane	12/12 stars	4
12	25 November	Sickening Stalls	Jessica; Shane	12/12 stars	—N/a
13	26 November	Wicked Waterways	Hollie; Shane	2/6 stars	3 5
14	27 November	Chambers of Horror	AJ; Shane	11/12 stars	6
15	29 November	The Critter Clink	Victoria	9/11 stars	—N/a
16	30 November	Rancid Rotisserie	Russell	5/10 stars	—N/a
17	1 December	Cart-Astrophy	Giovanna; Vernon	8/8 stars	—N/a
18	2 December	Game of Groans	AJ; Mo	3/6 stars	—N/a
19	3 December	Celebrity Cyclone	Giovanna; Jordan; Shane; Vernon	4/4 stars	—N/a
20	4 December	The Table of Torment	Vernon	5/5 stars	—N/a
21	4 December	Frightening Feast	Giovanna	5/5 stars	—N/a
22	4 December	The Iron Maiden	Jordan	5/5 stars	—N/a

- ^Note 1: In this challenge, the celebrities were competing for their kits rather than their meals
- ^Note 2: The celebrities were separated into two teams, The Lords (AJ, Jordan, Mo, Russell, Shane and Vernon) and The Ladies (Beverley, Giovanna, Hollie, Jessica, Ruthie and Victoria).
- ^Note 3: As a result of the girls losing the live trial the previous day, it was compulsory for them to take part in this trial. One by one, they had 12 minutes to unlock themselves from the bar and earn two stars. The order was Giovanna, Ruthie, Beverley, Jessica, Hollie and Victoria. Victoria managed to unlock herself but failed to get two stars in time.
- ^Note 4: Beverley was ruled out of this trial on medical grounds.
- ^Note 5: In this trial, each star was worth two meals for camp.
- ^Note 6: Russell was ruled out of this trial on medical grounds.

== Star count ==
Celebrity	Number of stars earned	Percentage
Giovanna Fletcher	34/39 stars	87%
Jordan North	47/51 stars	92%
Vernon Kay	34/37 stars	92%
Shane Richie	57/66 stars	86%
Mo Farah	19/28 stars	68%
AJ Pritchard	27/40 stars	68%
Jessica Plummer	35/46 stars	76%
Russell Watson	16/22 stars	73%
Beverley Callard	27/32 stars	84%
Victoria Derbyshire	26/33 stars	79%
Ruthie Henshall	21/24 stars	88%
Hollie Arnold	19/28 stars	68%

== Castle Coin Challenges ==
As well as competing in the trials, celebrities have to complete 'Castle Coin Challenges' in order to earn treats for themselves. At least 2 celebrities will be chosen to compete in the challenge. They must complete the challenge they have been given in order to win 'Castle Coins'. After completion of the challenge, the celebrities will take the Castle Coins and head to the Ye Olde Shoppe, where they will purchase one of two snack options, from Kiosk Cledwyn. However, before they are allowed to take the prize, the other celebrities back at the living quarters must answer a question either based on a recent survey or a general knowledge question. If they get the question right, they will earn the treat, but if they get it wrong, the celebrities will go back empty-handed.

The celebrities got the question correct
The celebrities got the question wrong
No question was asked

Episode	Air date	Celebrities	Prizes available	Prize chosen	Notes
3	17 November	Giovanna; Hollie	Welsh Cakes; Twiglets	Welsh Cakes	—N/a
4	18 November	AJ; Jessica	Bread & Butter; Sweet Popcorn	Bread & Butter	—N/a
5	19 November	Beverley; Shane	Custard Creams; Ready Salted Crisps	Custard Creams	7
6	20 November	Mo; Victoria	Jelly Worms; Mixed Nuts	Jelly Worms	—N/a
8	22 November	Russell; Vernon	Jammie Dodgers; Pretzels	Jammie Dodgers	—N/a
9	23 November	Jordan; Ruthie	Chocolate Mini Eggs; Scotch Eggs	Scotch Eggs	—N/a
10	24 November	Giovanna; Shane	Marshmallows; The Plug for the Bath	Marshmallows	—N/a
11	25 November	Beverley; Giovanna; Jessica; Ruthie	A Spa Trip for Four Campmates	Giovanna; Hollie; Russell; Vernon	8
12	26 November	Hollie; Victoria	Gingerbread Men; Jelly Beans	Jelly Beans	—N/a
13	27 November	Mo; Vernon	Chocolate Coins; Mini Cheddars	Chocolate Coins	—N/a
16	30 November	Giovanna; Mo	Chocolate Eclairs; Cheese & Crackers	Chocolate Eclairs	—N/a
17	1 December	Beverley; Shane	Access to The Castle Inn		9
18	2 December	AJ; Jessica	Treats from Home for AJ, Giovanna & Jordan; Fruit Platter	Treats from Home for AJ, Giovanna & Jordan	—N/a
19	3 December	Jordan; Vernon	Chocolate Orange; Mince Pies	Mince Pies	—N/a

- ^Note 7: As part of a secret mission to win luxury items for camp, Russell and Ruthie had to convince the celebrities to answer the question incorrectly.
- ^Note 8: The campmates taking part in the Castle Coin challenge were selected at random. Beverley, Giovanna, Jessica and Ruthie each had to select one campmate for whom they wanted to win a spa day. They chose Vernon, Hollie, Giovanna and Russell respectively. There was no question asked to receive the spa day.
- ^Note 9: The campmates taking part in the Castle Coin challenge were playing for access to the castle pub, 'The Castle Inn'.

== Controversies ==
- On 13 November 2020, the RSPCA stated that they had "serious concerns about the welfare of animals" featured in the programme. They stated that the production company had got in touch with them ahead of the 20th series taking place in the UK, where the RSPCA had advised they consider using welfare-friendly alternatives to animals in the Bushtucker trials, but that they were "really disappointed" that animals were still planned to be used in the trials. They recommended viewers could contact Ofcom, or ITV directly if they wanted to take action.
- On 24 November 2020, rural crime officers from North Wales Police announced they were investigating set management and biosecurity, after concerns were raised by conservationists that the cockroaches, whip scorpions, mealworms and crayfish used in bushtucker trials might escape into the local environment. Gwrych Castle woods is a site of special scientific interest, meaning it is home to some of the country's rarest species or habitats, and so would be particularly vulnerable to invasive non-native species.

== Ratings ==
Official ratings are taken from BARB, utilising the four-screen dashboard which includes viewers who watched the programme on laptops, smartphones, and tablets within 7 days of the original broadcast.

Episode	Air date	Official rating (millions incl. HD & +1)	Weekly rank for all UK TV channels
1	15 November	14.27	1
2	16 November	13.30	1
3	17 November	12.78	2
4	18 November	11.95	3
5	19 November	11.65	5
6	20 November	11.93	4
7	21 November	7.87	10
8	22 November	11.14	7
9	23 November	11.34	3
10	24 November	11.22	4
11	25 November	11.10	6
12	26 November	11.18	5
13	27 November	11.06	7
14	28 November	6.73	11
15	29 November	10.61	8
16	30 November	10.55	4
17	1 December	10.28	5
18	2 December	9.84	6
19	3 December	10.62	3
20	4 December	11.57	1
Series average	2020	11.05	—N/a
A Castle Story	13 December	4.50	32
