= Lloyd Hesketh Bamford-Hesketh =

Welsh architect and antiquary

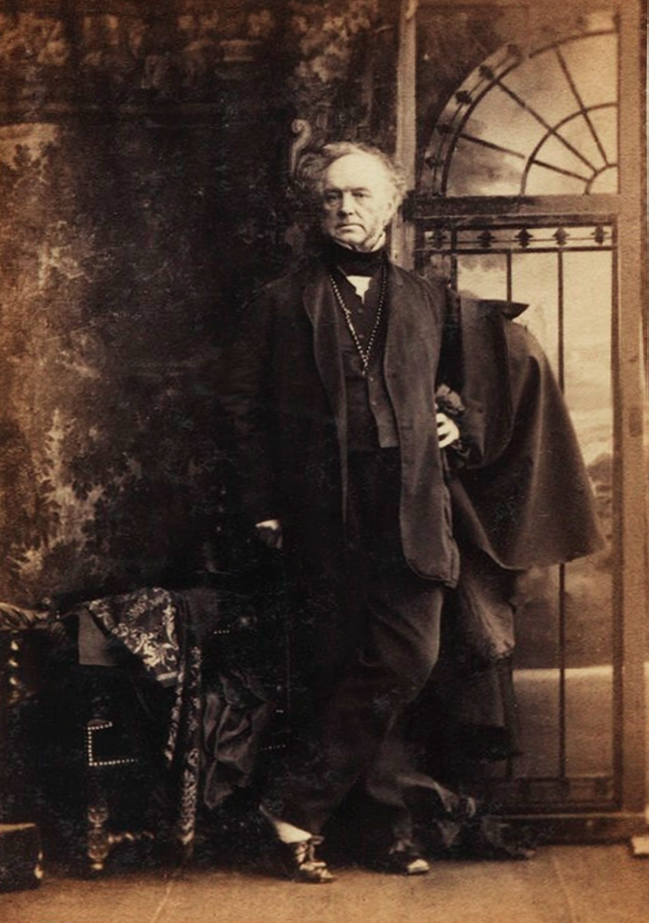
- Born: 1788; Abergele, Wales
- Died: 1861 (aged 73); London
- Spouse: Lady Emily Esther Ann Lygon (m. 1825; died 1861)
- Issue: Robert Bamford-Hesketh
- House: Lloyd and Hesketh
- Father: Robert Bamford-Hesketh
- Mother: Frances Lloyd

Lloyd Hesketh Bamford-Hesketh (1788–1861) was the owner of the Gwrych Castle estate in the historic county of Denbighshire, Wales. He was the High Sheriff of Denbighshire in 1828.

== Early life ==
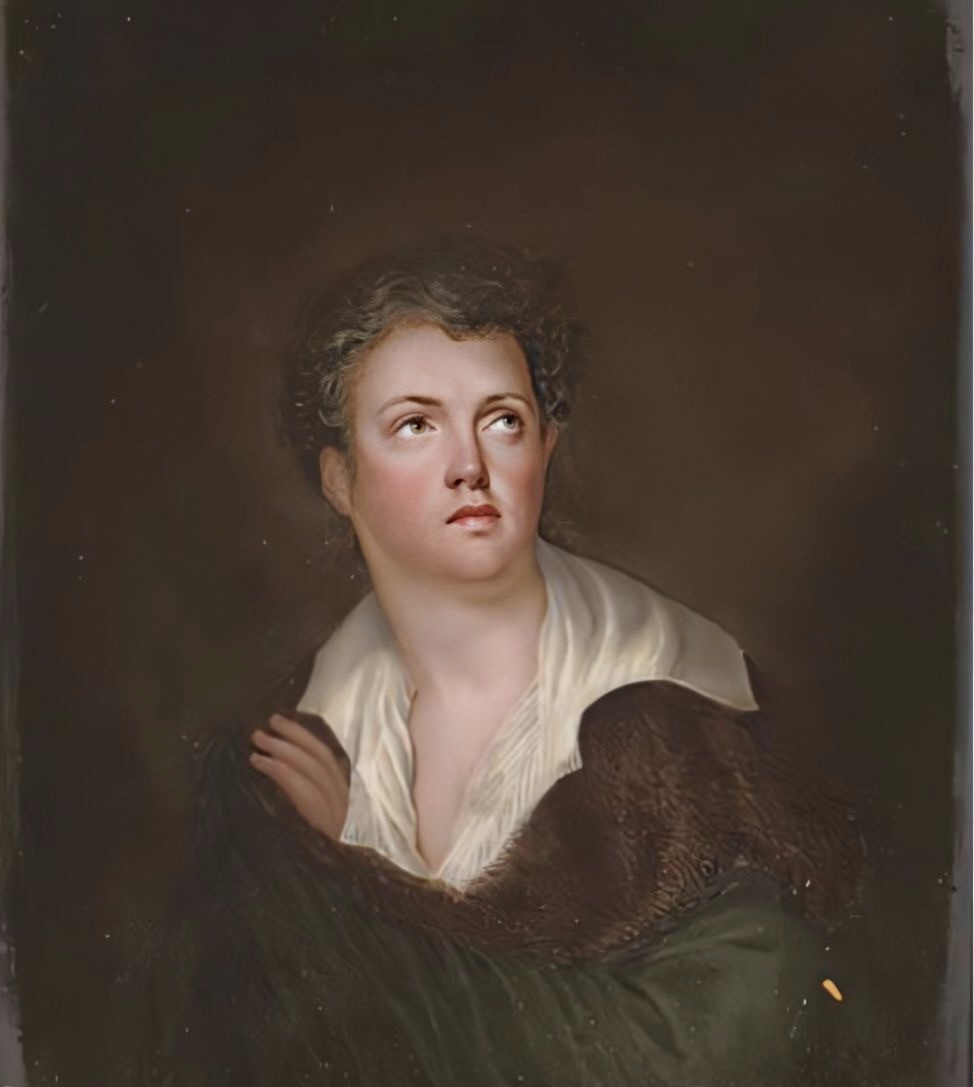
Portrait of Bamford-Hesketh, c. 1810

Bamford-Hesketh's parents, who were married in 1787, were Frances Lloyd of Gwrych and Robert Bamford-Hesketh of Bamford Hall and Upton Hall. His grandfather, Robert Bamford-Hesketh, was the heir to the Bamford estate.

The Lloyds of Gwrych resided at 'Plâs yn Gwrych' in a coastal strip between Abergele and Llanddulas. Over successive generations from the sixteenth century, the family created a gentry seat with formal gardens, estate buildings, a bathing house at Ty Crwn and extensive walled gardens.

== Career ==
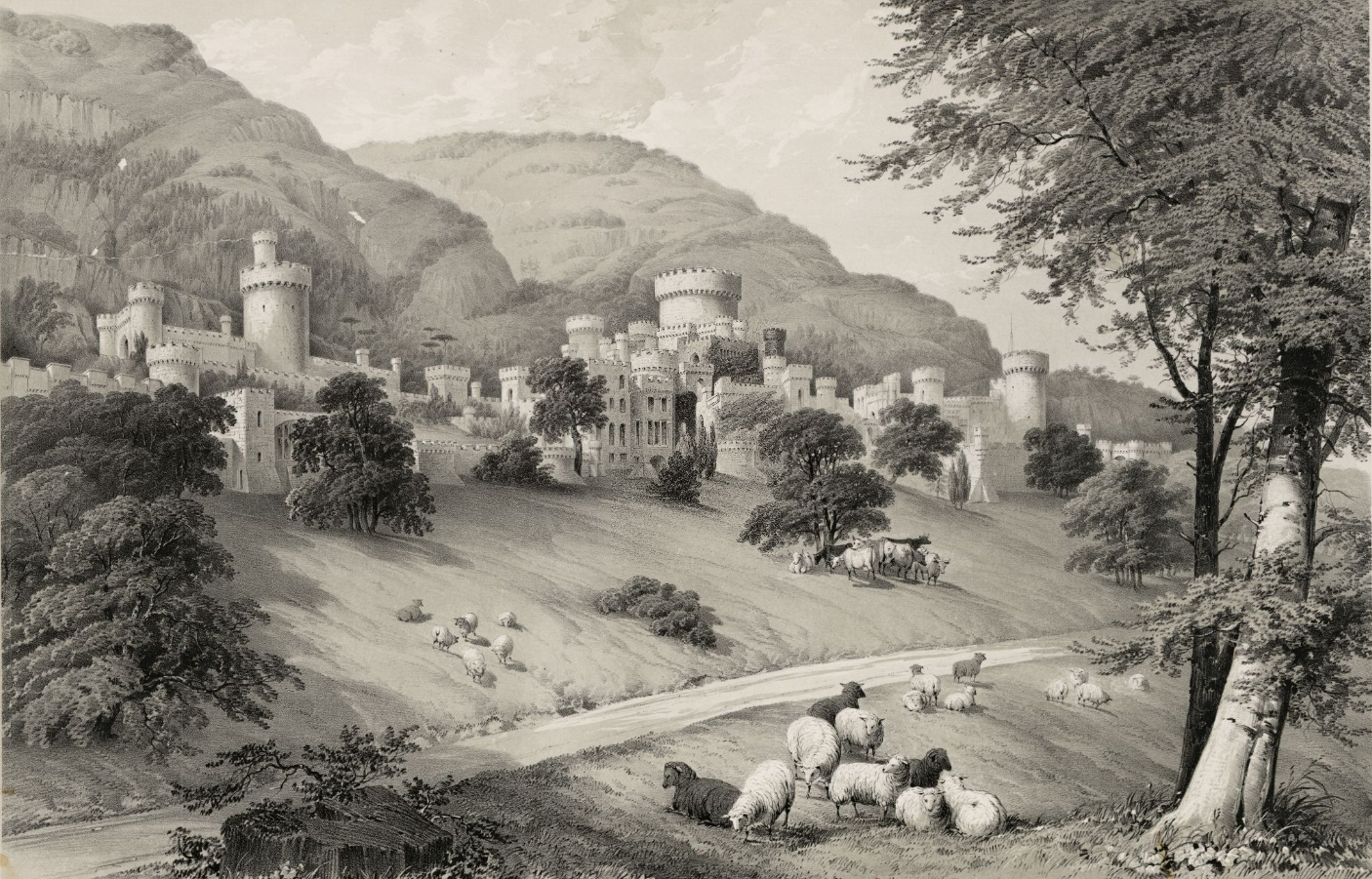
Gwrych Castle, c.1840, designed by Lloyd Hesketh Bamford-Hesketh as own his home

Gwrych Castle was built by Lloyd as a memorial to his mother and her ancestors much to his own designs. As a Fellow of the Society of Antiquaries, he took a keen interest in medieval architecture, art and archaeology. There is clear evidence that the castle was complete by the time he married Lady Emily in 1825 as there were no references to the marriage in the heraldic glass at Gwrych Castle.

== Personal life ==
In 1825, Bamford-Hesketh married Lady Emily Esther Ann Lygon (1800–1873), the youngest daughter of the 1st Earl Beauchamp. Together, they were the parents of:

- Robert Bamford Hesketh (1826–1894)

At his death in 1861, the heir to Gwrych Castle and the estate was Lloyd's son Robert Bamford-Hesketh (1826–1894) who married Ellen Jones-Bateman in 1851.
