= Snoochie Shy =

English radio presenter (born 1992)

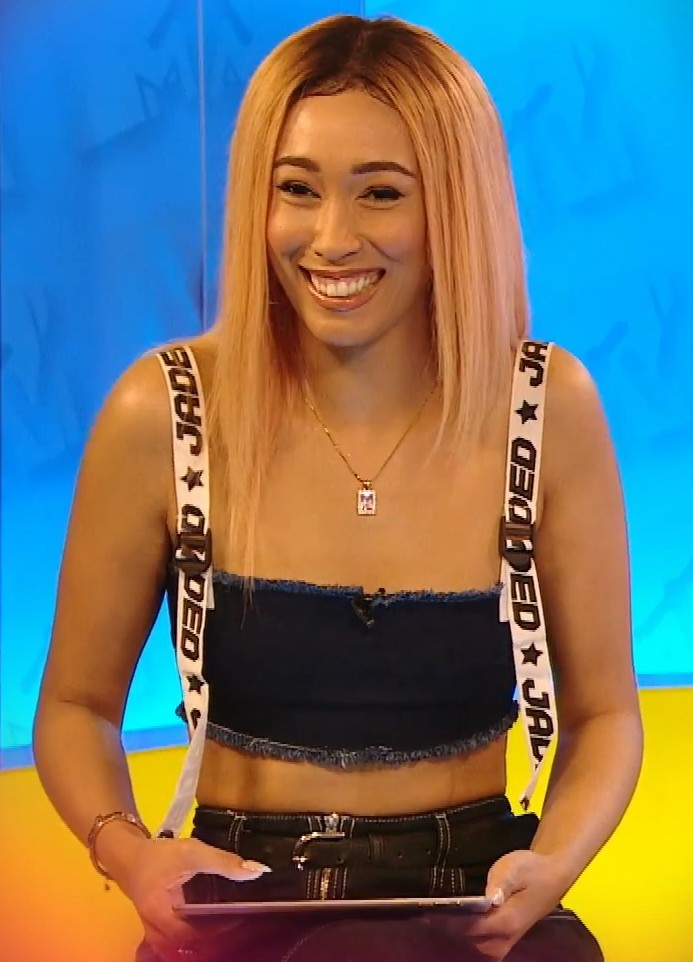
- Shy in 2018
- Born: Charlotte Davide; 13 July 1992 (age 34); Eltham, London, England
- Occupations: Television presenter; radio presenter; broadcaster; model

Cheyenne Davide (born Charlotte Davide; 13 July 1992), better known as Snoochie Shy, is an English radio presenter, television presenter and model. Since 2018, she has presented her own show on BBC Radio 1Xtra. In 2021, she was a contestant on the twenty-first series of I'm a Celebrity...Get Me Out of Here!. In 2022, she began presenting The Career Games on BBC Three.

== Life and career ==
=== Early life and career beginnings ===
Charlotte Davide was born on 13 July 1992 in Eltham, London to Kirsty Davide. Charlotte's first name was legally changed via deed poll to Cheyenne by her mother when she was eleven years old. She has a younger brother Zachariah, who was a contestant on the tenth series of Love Island. Her first presenting role was on MTV – The Wrap Up. In 2015, Shy began hosting the breakfast show on Radar, which she did until the suspension of the station in 2018 due to allegations of mistreatment and exploitation of its staff. Shy has also presented the revival edition of Yo! MTV Raps since 2018.

=== BBC Radio 1Xtra and other projects ===
In 2018, Shy joined BBC Radio 1 and began presenting a specialist music show every Monday to Thursday from 11pm till 1am on BBC Radio 1Xtra. In 2021, she joined the cast of Celebrity Gogglebox alongside Jeremy Vine. She has also made appearances on the ITV2 panel game shows Don't Hate the Playaz and CelebABility. Shy appeared on The Rap Game UK and has also made an appearance on Tonight with Target. In 2021, she hosted a podcast Slide in with Snoochie, Kaz and Jordan on BBC Sounds along with Love Island contestants Jordan Hames and Kazimir Crossley. In 2022, Shy appeared as a contestant on Celebrity Mastermind. She also appeared on the celebrity version of Hot Property on BBC Three in 2022.

=== I'm a Celebrity...Get Me Out of Here! and subsequent career ===
In November 2021, Shy was a contestant on the twenty-first series of I'm a Celebrity...Get Me Out of Here!. She was the third celebrity to be voted off the show. Shy has a birthmark on her right cheek, and was praised for talking about it during the show.

In February 2022, the BBC announced that Shy would present a new series Hire Me on the relaunched BBC Three channel. The six-part series features candidates trying to secure their dream jobs. In 2024, she was a contestant on series 19 of Celebrity Masterchef.

=== Modelling ===
Shy is also a model, and has modelled for brands such as Nike, Reebok, UGG, Adidas, Tommy Hilfiger, Warehouse, Vans, Hoodrich Womens, Dr. Martens and Missguided.
