= Giovanna Fletcher =

English media personality (born 1985)

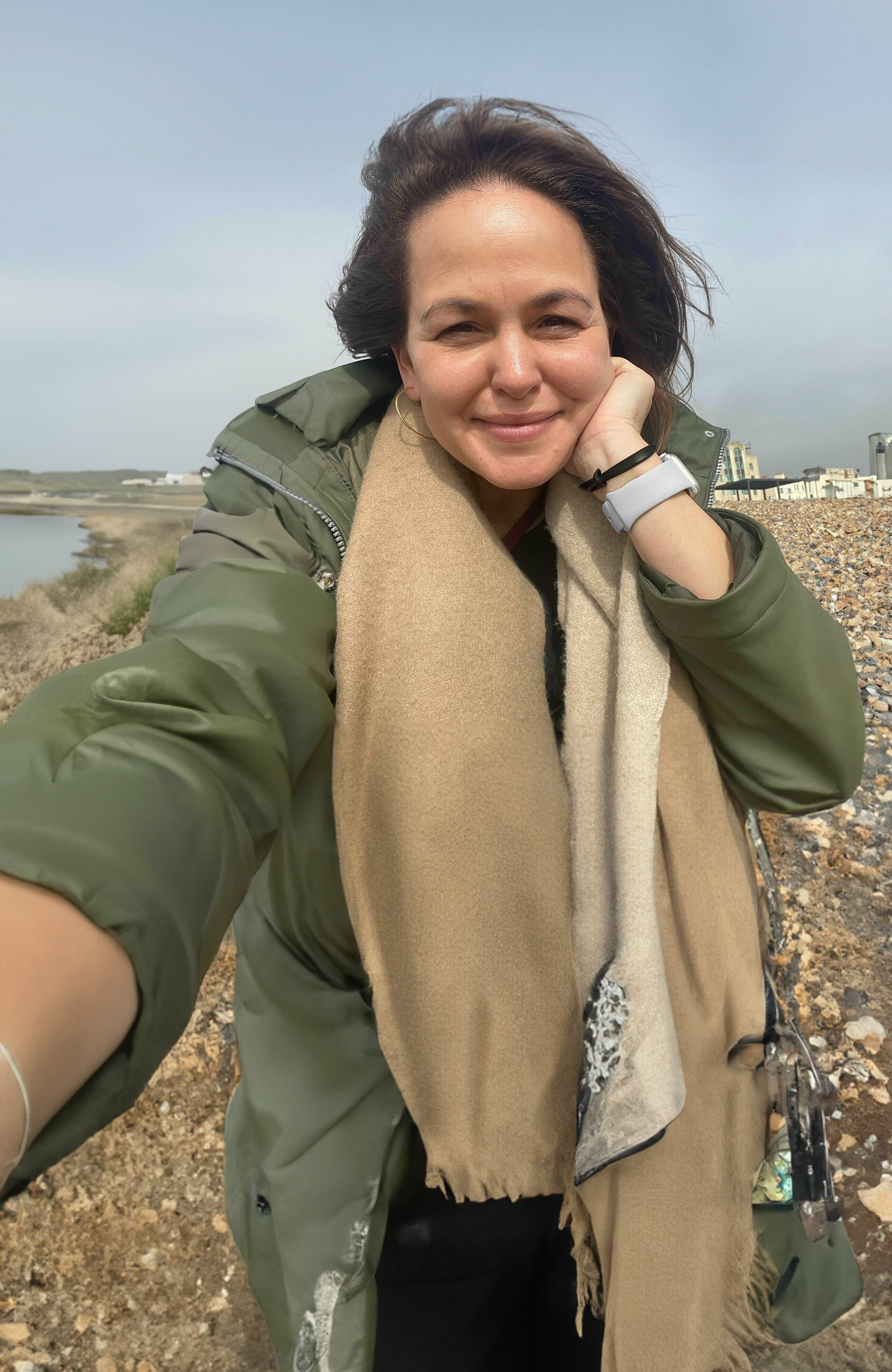
- Fletcher in 2023
- Born: Giovanna Falcone; 29 January 1985 (age 41); Essex, England
- Occupations: Actress; author; blogger; podcaster; presenter; vlogger
- Spouse: Tom Fletcher (m. 2012)
- Children: 3
- Relatives: Mario Falcone (brother); Carrie Hope Fletcher (sister-in-law)
- Website: giovannafletcher.com

Giovanna Fletcher (née Falcone, born 29 January 1985) is an English actress, author, podcaster, and presenter. She trained at the Sylvia Young Theatre School and Rose Bruford College and has performed in stage productions in London’s West End, including 2:22 A Ghost Story and Everybody's Talking About Jamie. Since 2019, she has presented the CBeebies series The Baby Club. She won series 20 of I'm a Celebrity...Get Me Out of Here!.

== Early life ==
Fletcher was born in Essex on 29 January 1985 to an Italian father, Mario, and English mother, Kim. She has two siblings: Giorgina and Mario Falcone. She attended the performing arts school Sylvia Young Theatre School in London, followed by Rose Bruford College.

== Career ==
=== Theatre ===
Early in her career, Fletcher understudied Andrea Riseborough in the 2008 production of Ivanov, alongside Tom Hiddleston and Kenneth Branagh in the title roles.

In December 2016, Fletcher had her professional concert debut, singing on stage in London's West End in Alan Menken's A Christmas Carol at the Lyceum Theatre. In December 2017, she performed in the musical production of her husband's novel The Christmasaurus alongside Tom, Carrie Hope Fletcher, Harry Judd and Matt Willis.

In 2021, it was announced that Fletcher would be playing Jenny in the stage play 2:22 A Ghost Story. Fletcher has continued to expand her stage career, starring in the UK tour of Wish You Were Dead, a stage adaptation of Peter James’ best-selling crime novel. In 2025, Giovanna Fletcher began starring as Rachel Watson in the UK tour of The Girl on the Train, a stage adaptation of Paula Hawkins' best-selling novel. The tour commenced on January 13, 2025, at Richmond Theatre in London.

=== Television and film work ===
Fletcher’s on-screen roles include an uncredited role in The Boat That Rocked, as a guest on Loose Women, as a contestant on All Star Mr & Mrs, and most recently as the presenter of The Baby Club on CBeebies. She has made appearances on ITV's morning TV show Lorraine since 2015, including presenting a segment for the show called Take 5. She took part in series 20 of I'm a Celebrity...Get Me Out of Here!. She was announced the winner of the series on 4 December 2020. She has also voiced roles in the UK versions of animated films including Migration (alongside her husband) and Smurfs.

=== Writing ===
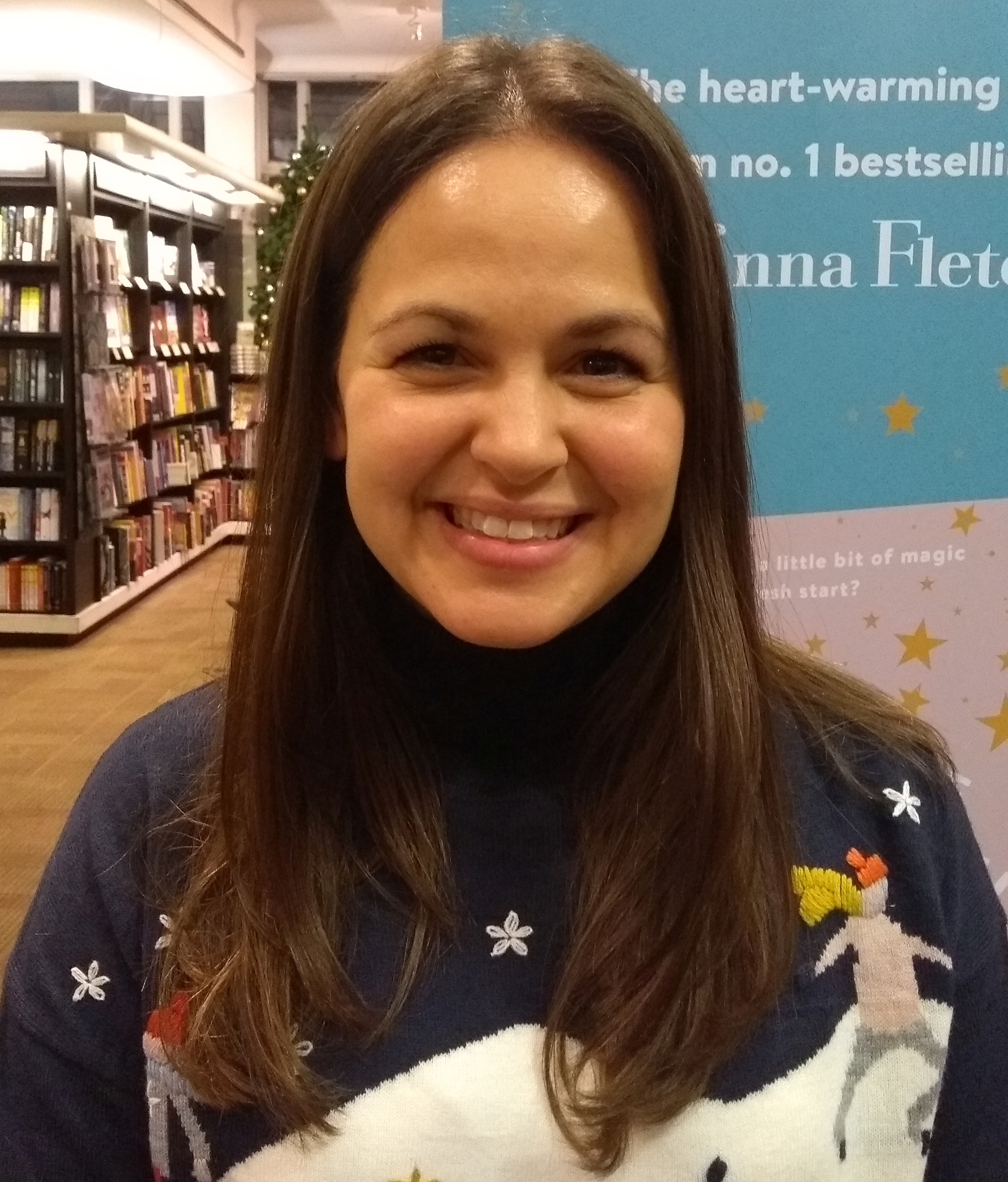
Fletcher in 2017

Fletcher wrote for several magazines, including as part of work experience at Heat, where she wrote book reviews and copy for their website, and an internship at Bliss magazine. Fletcher also worked at Recognise Magazine She also has a regular blog feature on Hello! magazine's website.

Fletcher's debut novel, Billy and Me, was published in 2013, followed by You're the One That I Want in 2014. Dream a Little Dream was published in 2015, and a fourth novel, Always with Love in 2016. In 2017, she published her first non-fiction book, Happy Mum, Happy Baby: My Adventures in Motherhood, and later that same year, released her fifth novel, Some Kind of Wonderful.

=== Music ===
Fletcher has sung in musical performances on several YouTube videos, posted to her husband, Tom's, YouTube channel. She has performed duet covers in a series called "Me & Mrs F", covering songs including "How Do You Like Your Eggs In the Morning?", "It Ain't Me Babe", "L-O-V-E", "You Really Got a Hold on Me", "Moon River", "Love Is on the Radio", and "Tonight You Belong to Me". Most of these covers have over half a million views each, with "Love Is on the Radio" having accumulated 1.8 million views over 3 years.

=== Podcasts ===
Fletcher is the host of parenting podcast Happy Mum, Happy Baby. The podcast gained national attention when Catherine, Duchess of Cambridge appeared to discuss her own experiences of motherhood. Fletcher also took the podcast on tour in 2019 with guests such as Helen Flanagan, Gemma Atkinson, Bryony Gordon, Jamelia, Ore & Portia Oduba, Kaytee Jones and Christine McGuinness.

In 2021, Fletcher began hosting a six-part series Journey to the Magic..., an official Walt Disney Travel Company podcast.

== Personal life ==
On 18 April 2011, Giovanna became engaged to Tom Fletcher from McFly. They were married on 12 May 2012. They have three children.

== Bibliography ==
- Fletcher, Giovanna (2013). Billy and Me. (Billy and Me Series Book #1) London: Penguin. ISBN 1250077125
- Fletcher, Giovanna (2014). You're the One That I Want. London: Penguin. ISBN 1405909978
- Fletcher, Giovanna (2014). Christmas With Billy and Me. (Billy and Me Series Book #1.5) London: Penguin. ISBN 9780718180454
- Fletcher, Giovanna (2015). Dream a Little Dream (Dream a Little Dream Series Book #1). London: Penguin. ISBN 9781405925877
- Fletcher, Giovanna (2015). Dream a Little Christmas Dream (Dream a Little Dream Series Book #1.5). London: Penguin. ISBN 1405919167
- Fletcher, Giovanna (2016). Always With Love. (Billy and Me Series Book #2) London: Penguin. ISBN 1405919183
- Fletcher, Giovanna (2017). Happy Mum, Happy Baby: My Adventures in Motherhood. London: Coronet. ISBN 1473651204
- Fletcher, Giovanna (2017). Some Kind of Wonderful. London: Penguin. ISBN 9781405924863
- Fletcher, Giovanna and Tom (2018). Eve of Man (Book 1). London: Penguin. ISBN 9780718186340
- Fletcher, Giovanna and Tom (2019). Eve of Man (Book 2). London: Penguin. ISBN 9780718184148
- Fletcher, Giovanna. (2020). Letters on Motherhood. London: Penguin. ISBN 9780241481097
- Fletcher, Giovanna (2021). Walking on Sunshine

Preceded by Jacqueline Jossa	I'm a Celebrity... Get Me Out of Here! Winner & Queen of the Castle; 2020	Succeeded by Danny Miller
