= The Baby Club =

British children's television series

- Genre: Preschool
- Directed by: Grant Orchard; Sander Jones
- Creative director: Jason Garbett
- Presented by: Giovanna Fletcher; Nigel Clarke
- Country of origin: United Kingdom
- Original language: English
- No. of series: 4
- No. of episodes: 80

Production
- Producer: Tom O'Connell
- Production location: London
- Camera setup: Multi-camera
- Running time: 15 minutes
- Production companies: Tiny House Productions; Three Arrows; CMP Productions

Original release
- Network: CBeebies
- Release: 4 March 2019

The Baby Club is a British preschool television series aimed at children up to 18 months old that premiered on CBeebies. It is produced by Three Arrows Media in association with Tiny House Productions and CMP Productions, with Jetpack Distribution handling international sales rights.

Each episode of the show is led by either Giovanna Fletcher or Nigel Clarke, who are joined by a group of six parents and their babies. The show also features an anthropomorphic teddy bear named "Baby Bear," who serves as a co-host alongside the presenters.

== Themes ==
Each episode revolves a titular theme, often inspired by household items such as blankets, mirrors, and paper. These objects form the basis for parents and their babies to engage in activities together, such as exploring everyday objects, singing songs, and telling stories. These activities are designed to be both educational and stimulating for both parents and children, with the program aimed at 'strengthening the bonds and experiences of new families'.

== Reception ==
The show was widely regarded as a useful resource for new parents. The Guardian's Stuart Heritage calls it "a godsend for frazzled new parents". Actress Gemma Atkinson called the show "brilliant" and stated that it was "very educational from a parent's point of view."

== Other media ==
Golden Bear Products released various products and toys associated with The Baby Club. A plush toy of Baby Bear was released as well as branded baby brows and activity sets.
