= Dragon Crusaders =

- DVD cover
- Directed by: Mark Atkins
- Starring: Dylan Jones; Cecily Fay; Feth Greenwood
- Production company: The Asylum
- Release date: September 27, 2011
- Running time: 90 minutes
- Country: United States
- Language: English

Dragon Crusaders is a 2011 American fantasy adventure film starring Dylan Jones, Cecily Fay and Feth Greenwood directed by Mark Atkins. It was dubbed in Tamil and was released on September 27, 2011.

== Plot ==
A group of fugitive Knights Templar attacks a pirate ship and they are cursed to turn into hideous monsters. To fight the curse and ultimately save the world, they must defeat the Sorcerer (The Black Dragon) who is determined to destroy it.

== Cast ==
- Dylan Jones as John the Brave
- Cecily Fay as Aerona
- Feth Greenwood as Eldred the Strong
- Shinead Byrne as Neem
- Tony Sams as Sigmund
- Simon Lloyd-Roberts as Maldwyn
- Charles Barrett as Harad
- Christian Howard as Calvain
- Steve McTigue as Faolon, The Black Dragon
- Gary Crosbie as Gerald
- Ambrose Flemming as Anthony
