= Sidemen Charity Match =

Charity football match between YouTubers

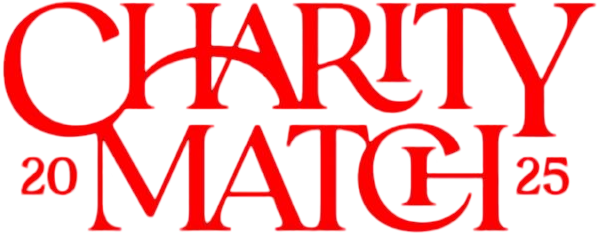
- Logo of the 2025 edition; the 2026 edition used the same wordmark with the year updated.

- Sidemen Football Club YouTube Allstars
- Sport: Association football
- Type: Friendly match
- Location: England
- First meeting: 3 June 2016; St Mary's Stadium; Sidemen FC 7–2 YouTube Allstars
- Latest meeting: 18 April 2026; Wembley Stadium; Sidemen FC 10–10 YouTube Allstars (1–4 pens.)
- Next meeting: Unknown
- Broadcasters: YouTube
- Stadiums: St Mary's Stadium (2016); The Valley (2017–2022); London Stadium (2023); Wembley Stadium (2025–2026)

Statistics
- Total meetings: 7
- Most wins: Sidemen FC (4)
- Top scorer: Miniminter (14)
- All-time record: Sidemen FC: 4; YouTube Allstars: 3
- Largest victory: Sidemen FC 7–1 YT Allstars (2 June 2018)
- Largest goal scoring: 20 goals (18 April 2026)
- Longest win streak: Sidemen FC, 3 (2018–2023)
- Current win streak: YouTube Allstars, 2 (2025–2026)
- Locations of the Sidemen Charity Matches in South East England

The Sidemen Charity Match is a recurring charity football match organised by British YouTube group the Sidemen. Founded in 2016, the event features two teams of influencers contesting a friendly match whilst raising money for various British charities.

The event has been held on seven occasions since 2016: one at St Mary's Stadium, three at the Valley, one at London Stadium, and two at Wembley Stadium. All matches have been livestreamed via YouTube, promoting various charitable causes. In the first six editions, the seven members of the Sidemen—KSI, W2S, Miniminter, Zerkaa, Vikkstar123, TBJZL, and Behzinga—and various affiliated YouTubers competed as Sidemen Football Club, (Note: Stylised as Sidemen FC or SDMN FC.) whilst various other influencers competed as the YouTube Allstars. In the 2026 edition, three of the Sidemen played for the YouTube Allstars for the first time.

The fourth charity match, held in 2022, is recognised by Guinness World Records for the highest live viewership on a YouTube charity sports match, peaking at over 2.5 million viewers. As of 2026, the events have raised over £14.7 million for various British charities.

== History ==
=== Background (2013–2015) ===
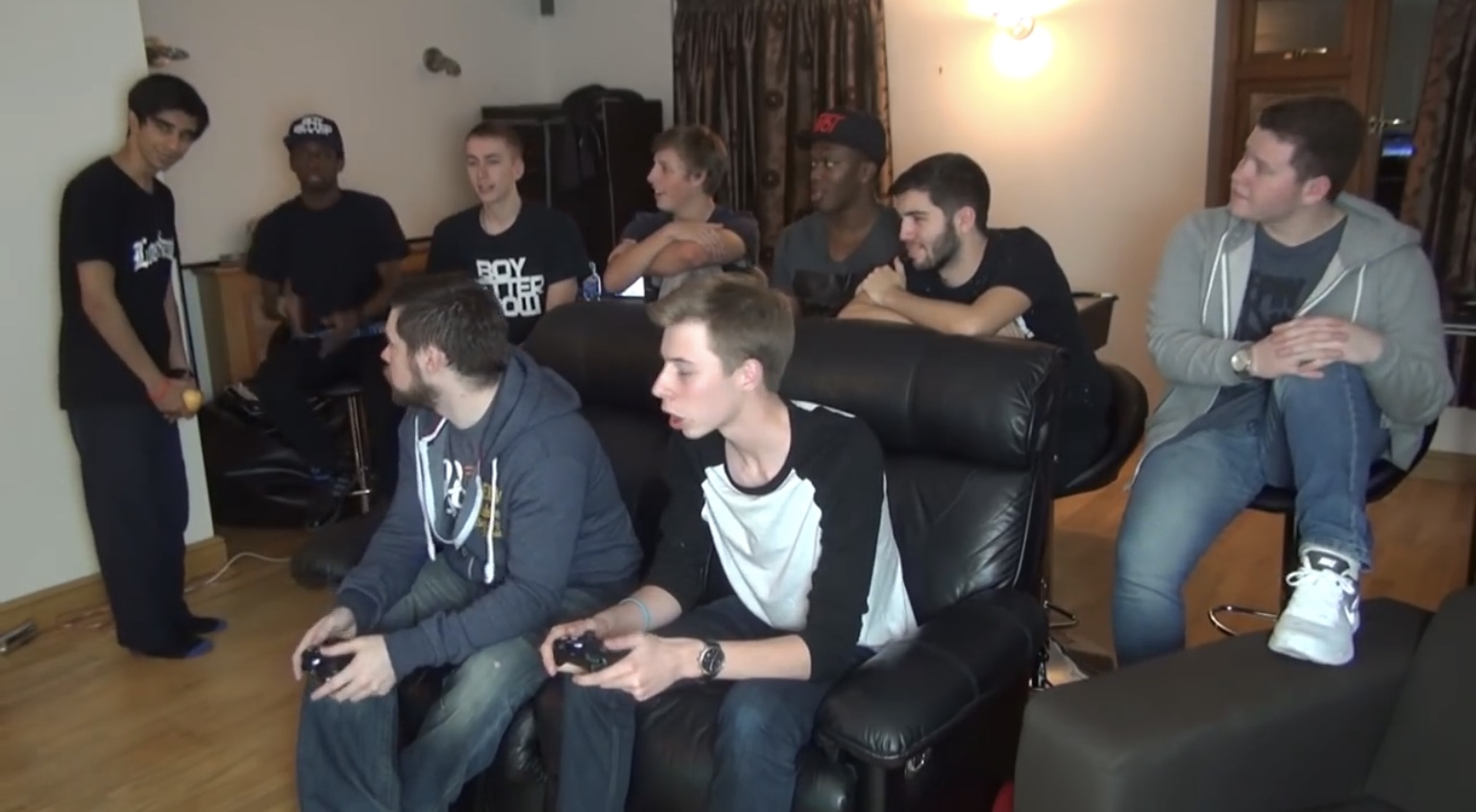
The Sidemen (back row) was founded in 2013, often collaborating on football-related content.

The Sidemen was founded in 2013 as a YouTube group creating Grand Theft Auto Online content. The six founding members—KSI, Miniminter, Zerkaa, Vikkstar123, TBJZL and Behzinga—were later joined by W2S in 2014. The group frequently collaborated on real-life association football content, as well as through the FIFA video game franchise, and established a content house.

Prior to the first Sidemen Charity Match, five members of the group—all except KSI and Vikkstar123—participated in the inaugural EE Wembley Cup on 8 August 2015 as part of Sidemen United, a team that was established for the match; they lost 5–2 against Spencer FC. The Wembley Cup was held annually for three more years without Sidemen United, although Sidemen members W2S, TBJZL and KSI participated in the 2017 edition as part of Tekkers Town, who lost 6–1 to Hashtag United.

=== St Mary's Stadium (2016) ===
The inaugural Sidemen Charity Match was held at St Mary's Stadium in Southampton, on 3 June 2016, raising over £110,000 for the Saints Foundation. Over 600,000 people watched the livestream on YouTube—a record for YouTube Gaming at the time—and 15,000 people attended the match; the stadium only permitted the Sidemen to fill the stadium to half-capacity. In addition to the seven Sidemen members, notable players included grime musicians Jme and P Money, as well as fellow YouTubers Joe Sugg and ChrisMD. Sidemen FC won the match 7–2, including a hat-trick from Miniminter.

=== The Valley (2017–2022) ===
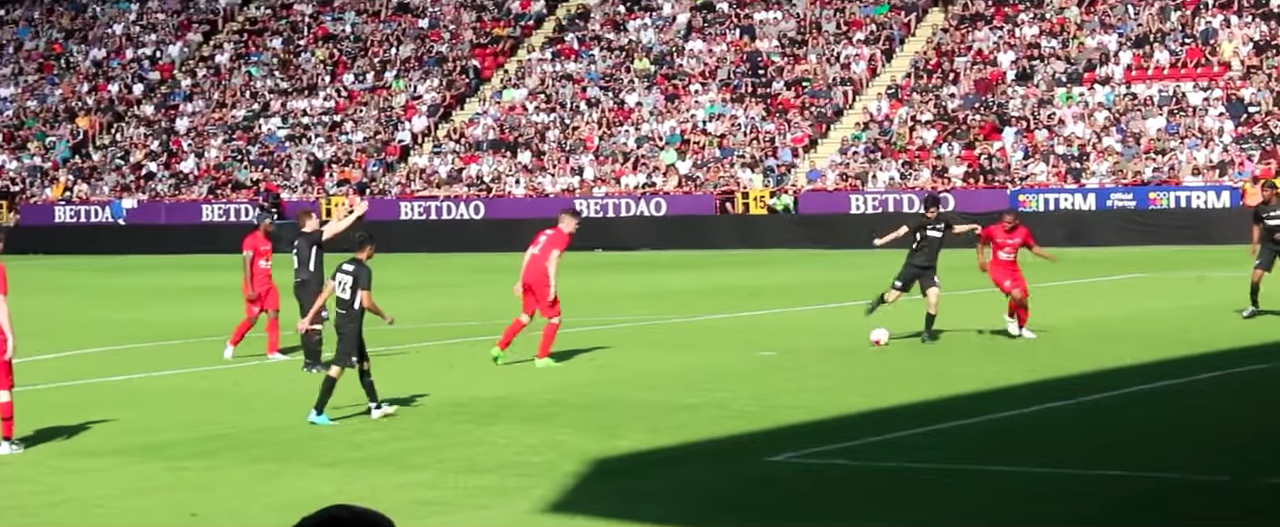
The Sidemen Charity Match was held at the Valley three times between 2017 and 2022.

Three subsequent matches were held at the Valley in Charlton, London. The second match in 2017 raised £210,000 for the NSPCC and the Charlton Athletic Community Trust (CACT). The 2018 edition raised £65,747 for CACT and Young Minds. The YouTube Allstars won the former match 2–0, whilst Sidemen FC won the latter 7–1. Notable players across these matches featured Deji, WillNE, Lachlan Power and Caspar Lee.

After a four-year hiatus, the highly anticipated fourth match in 2022 raised over £1,000,000 for CALM, Teenage Cancer Trust, Rays of Sunshine and Miniminter's M7 Education. New entrants included MrBeast, LazarBeam, Noah Beck, IShowSpeed, Chunkz, Niko Omilana and GeorgeNotFound. Billy Wingrove and Mark Goldbridge acted as managers, with former Premier League and FIFA referee Mark Clattenburg officiating. Sidemen FC emerged victorious 8–7. The match later secured a Guinness World Record for "most viewers for a charity sports match live stream on YouTube" with 2,558,501.

=== London Stadium (2023) ===
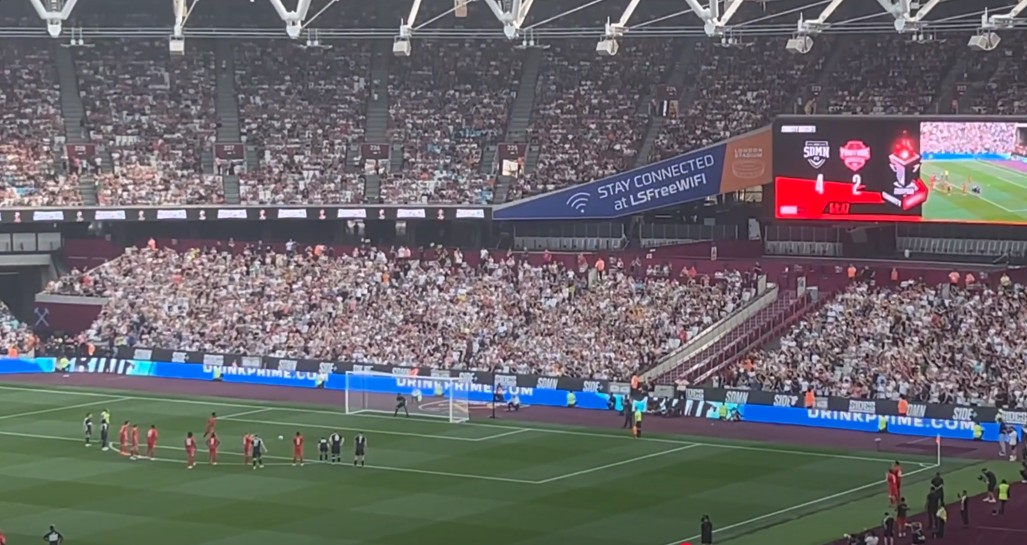
The 2023 edition was held at London Stadium and raised over £2.4 million.

A fifth match was held on 9 September 2023 at the 62,000-capacity London Stadium, the home stadium of Behzinga's supported team West Ham United. Sidemen FC defended the title with a 8–5 victory over the YouTube Allstars. Rapper Aitch performed for the inaugural halftime show. Debutants included Airrack, xQc, JiDion, Kai Cenat, AboFlah and Jacksepticeye. Max Fosh went viral for his yellow card incident, where he showed referee Clattenburg an Uno "Reverse" playing card. KSI performed Cristiano Ronaldo's trademark "siuuu" celebration when he saved a penalty from IShowSpeed, a prominent Ronaldo fan. The match raised over £2.4 million for CALM, Teenage Cancer Trust, Rays of Sunshine and M7 Education—the same charities as in 2022.

=== Wembley Stadium (2025–2026) ===
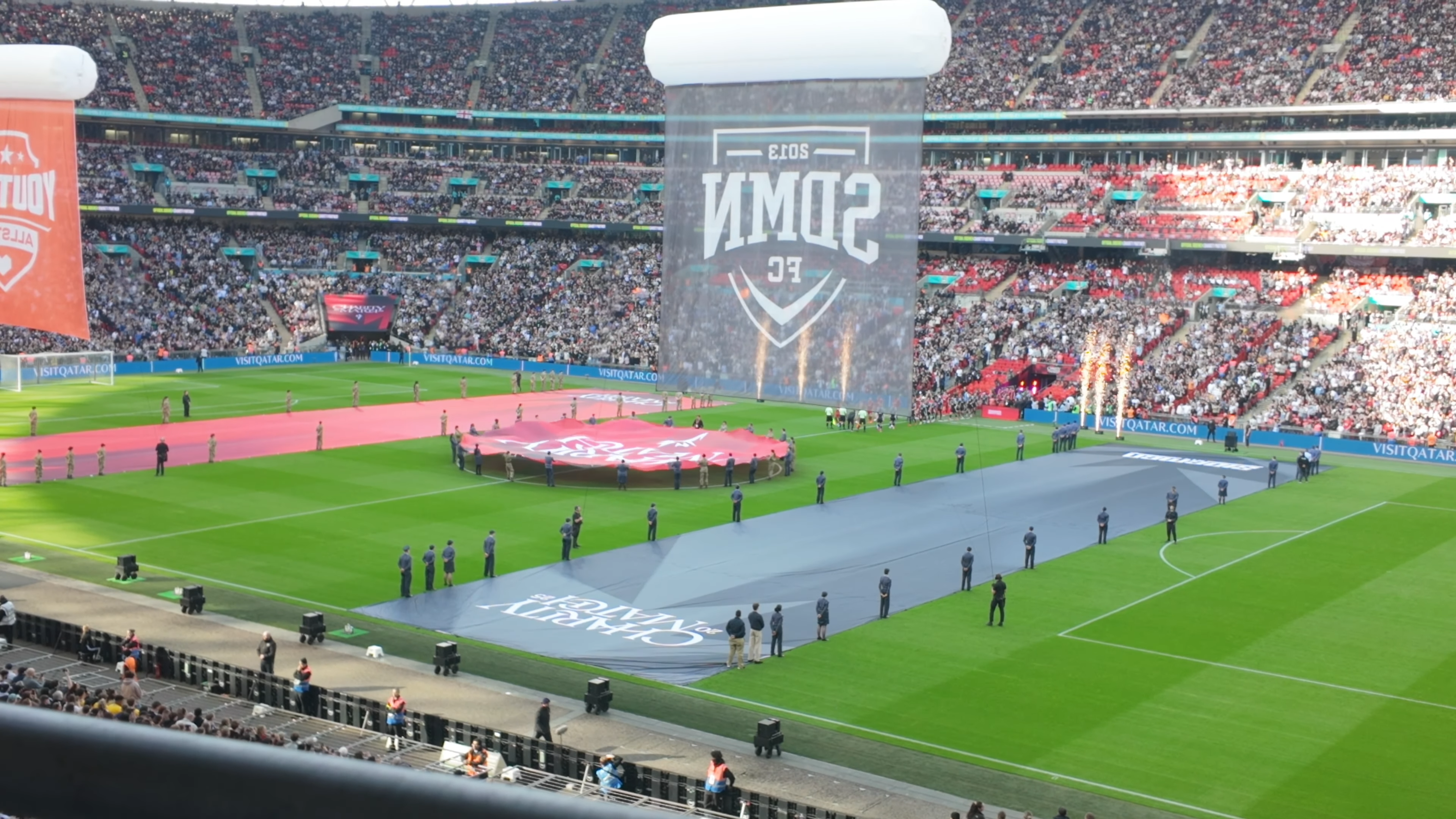
The 2025 edition raised over £4.5 million after selling out Wembley Stadium.

In November 2024, the Sidemen announced a sixth match would be held, later revealing it would take place on 8 March 2025 at Wembley Stadium, the largest stadium in the United Kingdom and the 17th-largest stadium in the world. The event sold out within three hours after ticket sales went live, drawing 90,000 spectators. The halftime show was performed by rapper AJ Tracey, with KSI also performing "Thick of It". Following a 9–9 draw, the YouTube Allstars won the subsequent penalty shoot-out 5–4. The squad list featured Mark Rober, Logan Paul, CarryMinati and Jynxzi. In a reiteration of his skit from the 2023 edition, Fosh responded to another yellow card from Clattenburg by putting it in a pocket-sized paper shredder. The match raised over £4.7 million for BBC's Children in Need (50%), Sidemen's Bright Side (43%) and M7 Education (7%), and drew in over eight million live viewers.

On the 14 December 2025, it was announced that the Charity Match would return for a seventh instalment in 2026. The match was played on 18 April 2026, with the YouTube Allstars defending their victory, following a 10–10 draw and a 4–1 win in the subsequent penalty shoot-out. In a first for the event, three members of the Sidemen—KSI, Miniminter and Behzinga—played on the YouTube Allstars. Notable events in the match included referee Clattenburg overturning Sidemen FC player Niko Omilana's early goal over an ostensibly incorrect offside decision; and Fosh, in a third iteration of his yellow card–denial skits, burned a yellow card from Clattenburg in a magic trick. Fosh was initially not invited to participate in the match, but was asked by Miniminter via a voice note sent six days before the match to join after Spanish YouTuber El Rubius, who was announced to join the YouTube Allstars in the Sidemen Charity Match draft held the previous month, dropped out of the match, with Fosh having only that time to come up with and prepare the card burning skit. Multi-platinum rapper Tinie Tempah performed the halftime show. The match raised over £6.2 million for two returning Sidemen-affiliated charities: Bright Side (86%) and M7 Education (14%).

== Match results ==
All times are local, GMT (UTC±0) (Note: Applies between the last Sunday in October and the last Sunday in March.) or BST (UTC+1) (Note: Applies between the last Sunday in March and the last Sunday in October.).

| Sidemen | YouTube Allstars |

=== 2016 ===
3 June 2016
14:00 BST (UTC+01:00)

| Sidemen | 7–2 | YouTube Allstars |
|---|---|---|
| Tobiias 15' (o.g.); TBJZL 45'; Miniminter 51', 71', 73'; Manny 53', 61' | | JMX 58'; Weller 72' |

St Mary's Stadium, Southampton
Attendance: 15,000

| | 0 | (England) Jme |
| GK | 1 | (England) HughWizzy |
| | 4 | (England) Zerkaa |
| | 6 | (England) Spencer FC |
| | 7 | (England) Miniminter (c) |
| | 10 | (England) Marcus Butler |
| | 11 | (England) P Money |
| | 15 | (England) Behzinga |
| | 17 | (England) Manny |
| | 19 | (England) Lewis Redman |
| | 21 | (England) TBJZL |
| | 69 | (England) KSI |
| | 77 | (Guernsey) W2S |
| | 87 | (England) Bateson |
| | 123 | (England) Vikkstar123 |

| GK | 1 | (Serbia) David Vujanic |
| | 5 | (England) CapgunTom |
| | 7 | (England) Callux |
| | 8 | (England) HurderOfBuffalo |
| | 9 | (England) Joe Weller |
| | 10 | (Jersey) ChrisMD |
| | 13 | (Canada) BajanCanadian |
| | 15 | (England) Joe Sugg |
| | 17 | (England) Calfreezy (c) |
| | 21 | (England) Oli White |
| | 22 | (England) Tobiias |
| | 25 | (England) JMX |
| | 27 | (England) Nepenthez |
| | 69 | (England) AnEsonGib |
| | 75 | (England) Poet |

=== 2017 ===
21 May 2017
14:00 BST (UTC+01:00)

| Sidemen | 0–2 | YouTube Allstars |
|---|---|---|
| | | Castro 3'; ChrisMD 90' |

The Valley, London
Attendance: 26,000

| GK | 1 | (England) Charlie Morley |
| RB | 4 | (England) Zerkaa |
| CB | 77 | (Guernsey) W2S |
| CB | 75 | (England) Poet |
| LB | 4 | (England) Jme |
| RM | 21 | (England) TBJZL |
| CM | 16 | (England) Behzinga |
| CM | 17 | (England) Manny |
| LM | 12 | (England) KSI |
| ST | 123 | (England) Vikkstar123 |
| ST | 7 | (England) Miniminter (c) |
Substitutes:
| | 92 | (Serbia) David Vujanic |
| | 8 | (England) P Money |
| | 87 | (England) Bateson |
| | 19 | (England) Lewis Redman |

| GK | 30 | (England) HughWizzy |
| RB | 7 | (England) Callux |
| CB | 4 | (South Africa) Josh Pieters |
| CB | 5 | (England) Reev |
| LB | 44 | (England) AnEsonGib |
| CDM | 25 | (England) JMX |
| CDM | 17 | (England) Calfreezy (c) |
| RM | 1 | (England) Deji |
| CAM | 10 | (Jersey) ChrisMD |
| LM | 2 | (England) WillNE |
| ST | 50 | (England) Marcus Butler |
Substitutes:
| | 69 | (South Africa) Caspar Lee |
| | 9 | (England) Oli White |
| | 19 | (England) TheBurntChip |
| | 21 | (United States) Castro |

=== 2018 ===
2 June 2018
16:00 BST (UTC+01:00)

| Sidemen | 7–1 | YouTube Allstars |
|---|---|---|
| Miniminter 2', 47', 60'; KSI 10', 77'; Vikkstar123 57' (pen.); TBJZL 83' | | ChrisMD 65' |

The Valley, London

| GK | 1 | (England) Charlie Morley |
| CB | 77 | (Guernsey) W2S |
| CB | 15 | (England) Behzinga |
| CB | 4 | (England) Zerkaa |
| CDM | 6 | (England) KSI |
| RM | 8 | (England) Alfie Deyes |
| CM | 69 | (United States) RiceGum |
| CM | 21 | (England) TBJZL |
| LM | 10 | (United States) FaZe Adapt |
| ST | 123 | (England) Vikkstar123 |
| ST | 7 | (England) Miniminter (c) |
Substitutes:
| | 5 | (Australia) Lachlan Power |
| | 0 | (England) Jme |
| | 22 | (United States) Keemstar |
| | 17 | (England) Manny |

| GK | 30 | (England) HughWizzy |
| RB | 3 | (Iran) Mo Vlogs |
| CB | 8 | (England) Romell Henry |
| CB | 2 | (England) WillNE |
| LB | 1 | (England) Deji |
| RM | 15 | (England) Joe Sugg |
| CM | 17 | (England) Calfreezy (c) |
| CM | 11 | (England) Callux |
| LM | 7 | (Spain) DjMaRiiO |
| CF | 10 | (Jersey) ChrisMD |
| ST | 0 | (Canada) King Bach |
Substitutes:
| | 161 | (England) Stephen Tries |
| | 44 | (England) AnEsonGib |
| | 22 | (England) Jay Swingler |
| | | (United States) PrestonPlayz |

=== 2022 ===
24 September 2022
15:00 BST (UTC+01:00)

| Sidemen | 8–7 | YouTube Allstars |
|---|---|---|
| Vikkstar123 12'; TBJZL 18', 49'; Miniminter 32', 67', 88'; ChrisMD 71'; Manny 86' | Report | Chunkz 6'; Omilana 9', 74'; YungFilly 26'; Baker 41'; Castro 51'; WillNE 81' |

The Valley, London
Attendance: 27,111
Referee: Mark Clattenburg

| GK | 1 | (England) Pieface |
| RB | 17 | (England) Calfreezy |
| CB | 15 | (England) Behzinga |
| CB | 77 | (Guernsey) W2S |
| LB | 4 | (England) Zerkaa |
| RM | 23 | (United States) MrBeast |
| CM | 5 | (England) KSI (c) |
| CM | 10 | (Jersey) ChrisMD |
| LM | 21 | (England) TBJZL |
| ST | 7 | (England) Miniminter |
| ST | 123 | (England) Vikkstar123 |
Substitutes:
| | 11 | (England) Callux |
| | 8 | (United States) Karl Jacobs |
| | 27 | (England) Manny |
| | 13 | (England) Randolph |
| | 0 | (England) Jme |
| | 14 | (Australia) LazarBeam |
Manager:
(England) Billy Wingrove

| GK | 1 | (England) Cal the Dragon |
| RB | 2 | (England) WillNE |
| CB | 6 | (England) Harry Pinero |
| CB | 14 | (England) Theo Baker |
| LB | 4 | (England) AnEsonGib |
| CDM | 8 | (United States) Noah Beck |
| CDM | 10 | (England) Yung Filly |
| RM | 7 | (United States) IShowSpeed | (yellow card) 65' |
| CAM | 21 | (England) Chunkz |
| LM | 91 | (United States) Castro |
| ST | 69 | (England) Niko Omilana (c) |
Substitutes:
| | 404 | (England) GeorgeNotFound |
| | 22 | (United States) Chandler Hallow |
| | 13 | (United States) Ava Kris Tyson |
| | 27 | (England) Danny Aarons |
| | 1 | (England) Deji |
Manager:
(England) Mark Goldbridge

=== 2023 ===
9 September 2023
15:00 BST (UTC+01:00)

| Sidemen | 8–5 | YouTube Allstars |
|---|---|---|
| Behzinga 9'; Miniminter 45'; Manny 48', 50', 62'; TBJZL 60'; W2S 80'; Tareq 90+5' | Report | ChrisMD 15'; Chunkz 45+2'; Fosh 56'; KSI 67' (o.g.); Omilana 86' |

London Stadium, London
Attendance: 62,000
Referee: Mark Clattenburg

| GK | 69 | (England) KSI |
| RB | 14 | (Australia) LazarBeam |
| CB | 17 | (England) Calfreezy |
| CB | 77 | (Guernsey) W2S |
| LB | 0 | (England) Jme |
| RM | 4 | (England) Zerkaa |
| CM | 21 | (England) TBJZL |
| CM | 25 | (England) Behzinga (c) |
| LM | 1 | (United States) MrBeast |
| ST | 123 | (England) Vikkstar123 |
| ST | 7 | (England) Miniminter |
Substitutes:
| | 11 | (England) Callux |
| | 3 | (United States) Airrack |
| | 13 | (England) Angryginge |
| | 999 | (England) Deji |
| | 27 | (England) Manny |
| | 33 | (England) Randolph |
| | 99 | (Saudi Arabia) Tareq Salameh |
Manager:
(England) Billy Wingrove

| GK | 12 | (Canada) xQc |
| RB | 27 | (England) Danny Aarons |
| CB | 2 | (England) WillNE |
| CB | 33 | (United States) JiDion |
| LB | 5 | (England) Max Fosh | (yellow card) 77' |
| CDM | 10 | (Jersey) ChrisMD |
| CDM | 9 | (England) Yung Filly |
| RM | 7 | (United States) IShowSpeed |
| CAM | 14 | (England) Theo Baker (c) |
| LM | 3 | (United States) Kai Cenat |
| ST | 69 | (England) Niko Omilana |
Substitutes:
| | 32 | (Kuwait) AboFlah |
| | 21 | (England) Chunkz |
| | 34 | (United States) Duke Dennis |
| | 13 | (Republic of Ireland) Jacksepticeye |
| | 8 | (United States) Karl Jacobs |
| | 86 | (England) Konstantin |
Manager:
(England) Mark Goldbridge

=== 2025 ===
8 March 2025
15:00 GMT

| Sidemen | 9–9 | YouTube Allstars |
|---|---|---|
| Weller 7' (pen.), 42'; Miniminter 31'; TBJZL 45'; Paul 48'; Zerkaa 53' (pen.); Manny 76'; Behzinga 78'; Clarke 89' | Report | ChrisMD 12'; Baker 18', 34', 90'; xQc 27' (o.g.); IShowSpeed 56' (pen.); Angryginge 58'; Chunkz 63'; Cenat 68' |
Penalties
| Miniminter (penalty missed); Rober (penalty scored); W2S (penalty scored); Weller (penalty scored); KSI (penalty scored) | 4–5 | (penalty scored) Deji; (penalty scored) Baker; (penalty scored) ChrisMD; (penalty scored) Omilana; (penalty scored) IShowSpeed |

Wembley Stadium, London
Attendance: 90,000
Referee: Mark Clattenburg

| GK | 12 | (Canada) xQc |
| RB | 123 | (England) Vikkstar123 |
| CB | 77 | (Guernsey) W2S |
| CB | 19 | (England) KSI |
| LB | 24 | (United States) Mark Rober |
| RM | 21 | (England) TBJZL |
| CM | 25 | (England) Behzinga |
| CM | 1 | (United States) Logan Paul |
| LM | 9 | (England) Joe Weller |
| ST | 7 | (England) Miniminter (c) |
| ST | 4 | (England) Zerkaa |
Substitutes:
| | 0 | (England) Jme |
| | 14 | (Australia) LazarBeam |
| | 8 | (England) George Clarke |
| | 99 | (United States) JasonTheWeen |
| | 27 | (England) Manny |
| | 17 | (England) Randolph |
| | 11 | (England) Callux |
Manager:
(England) Calfreezy

| GK | 1 | (United States) Sketch |
| RB | 23 | (United States) MrBeast |
| CB | 13 | (England) Angryginge |
| CB | 5 | (England) Max Fosh | (yellow card) 51' |
| LB | 22 | (United States) Fanum |
| RM | 7 | (United States) IShowSpeed (c) |
| CM | 10 | (Jersey) ChrisMD |
| CM | 21 | (England) Chunkz |
| LM | 3 | (United States) Kai Cenat |
| ST | 69 | (England) Niko Omilana |
| ST | 14 | (England) Theo Baker |
Substitutes:
| | 27 | (England) Danny Aarons |
| | 2 | (England) WillNE |
| | 17 | (India) CarryMinati |
| | 999 | (England) Deji |
| | 67 | (United States) Jynxzi |
| | 25 | (Australia) Lachlan Power |
| | 66 | (United States) Stable Ronaldo |
Manager:
(England) TheBurntChip

=== 2026 ===
18 April 2026
15:00 BST (UTC+01:00)

| Sidemen | 10–10 | YouTube Allstars |
|---|---|---|
| TBJZL 13'; Marlon 15'; ChrisMD 34'; Jynxzi 37', 78'; AJ Shabeel 53' (pen.); Zerkaa 56'; Vikkstar123 66'; AB 70'; Niko 76' | Report | Angryginge 8'; Miniminter 28', 44', 83'; ItalianBach 40', 87'; Danny Aarons 47'; NYKChazza 49'; WillNE 63'; KSI 74' |
Penalties
| Jack Joseph (penalty missed); LazarBeam (penalty missed); ChrisMD (penalty scored) | 1–4 | Calfreezy (penalty scored); Ibai (penalty scored); Max Fosh (penalty scored); Mrwhosetheboss (penalty scored) |

Wembley Stadium, London
Attendance: 90,000
Referee: Mark Clattenburg

| GK | 12 | (Canada) xQc |
| RB | 9 | (France) AmineMaTue |
| CB | 77 | (Guernsey) W2S |
| CB | 3 | (Sweden) Marlon |
| LB | 0 | (England) Deji |
| RM | 61 | (Australia) LazarBeam |
| CM | 4 | (England) Zerkaa (c) |
| CM | 10 | (Jersey) ChrisMD |
| LM | 21 | (England) TBJZL |
| ST | 123 | (England) Vikkstar123 |
| ST | 22 | (England) Niko |
Substitutes:
| | 23 | (England) AB |
| | 14 | (United States) Adapt |
| | 30 | (England) AJ Shabeel |
| | 7 | (Jersey) ArthurTV |
| | 19 | (United States) Jynxzi |
| | 67 | (United States) Lacy |
Manager:
(England) Jack Joseph

| GK | 1 | (United States) Sketch |
| RB | 99 | (United States) JasonTheWeen |
| CB | 13 | (England) Angryginge |
| CB | 15 | (England) Mrwhosetheboss |
| LB | 28 | (England) Danny Aarons |
| RM | 5 | (India) CarryMinati |
| CM | 25 | (England) Behzinga |
| CM | 4 | (England) KSI (c) |
| LM | 11 | (Spain) Ibai |
| ST | 7 | (England) Miniminter |
| ST | 66 | (United States) Stable Ronaldo |
Substitutes:
| | 9 | (England) Max Fosh | (yellow card) 46' |
| | 17 | (England) NYKChazza |
| | 2 | (England) WillNE |
| | 8 | (England) George Clarke |
| | 88 | (England) ItalianBach |
| | 14 | (France) Squeezie |
Manager:
(England) Calfreezy

== Records and statistics ==
=== Money raised ===
| Year | Money raised | Charity(s) | Ref |
|---|---|---|---|
| 2016 | **£110,000** | Saints Foundation | |
| 2017 | **£210,000** | NSPCC | |
| 2017 | **£210,000** | Charlton Athletic Community Trust | |
| 2018 | **£65,747** | Charlton Athletic Community Trust | |
| 2018 | **£65,747** | Young Minds | |
| 2019 – 2021 | Not held | | |
| 2022 | **£1,000,000** | CALM; Teenage Cancer Trust; Rays of Sunshine; M7 Education | |
| 2023 | **£2,400,000** | CALM; Teenage Cancer Trust; Rays of Sunshine; M7 Education | |
| 2024 | Not held | | |
| 2025 | **£4,733,004** | BBC Children in Need | |
| 2025 | **£4,733,004** | Bright Side; M7 Education | |
| 2026 | **£6,218,875** | Bright Side; M7 Education | |
| Total | **£14,737,626** | —N/a | —N/a |

=== Participants ===
In the below table, an "S" on a black background indicates a Sidemen FC participant for that year, while a "Y" on a reddish background indicates a YouTube Allstars participant for that year. An "M" next to either "S" or "Y" indicates that the participant served as that team's manager for the match. Bolded player names are Sidemen members. (Note: KSI left the group in May 2026, the month following the most recent match. He will continue to be listed as a Sidemen member unless a new match is played.)

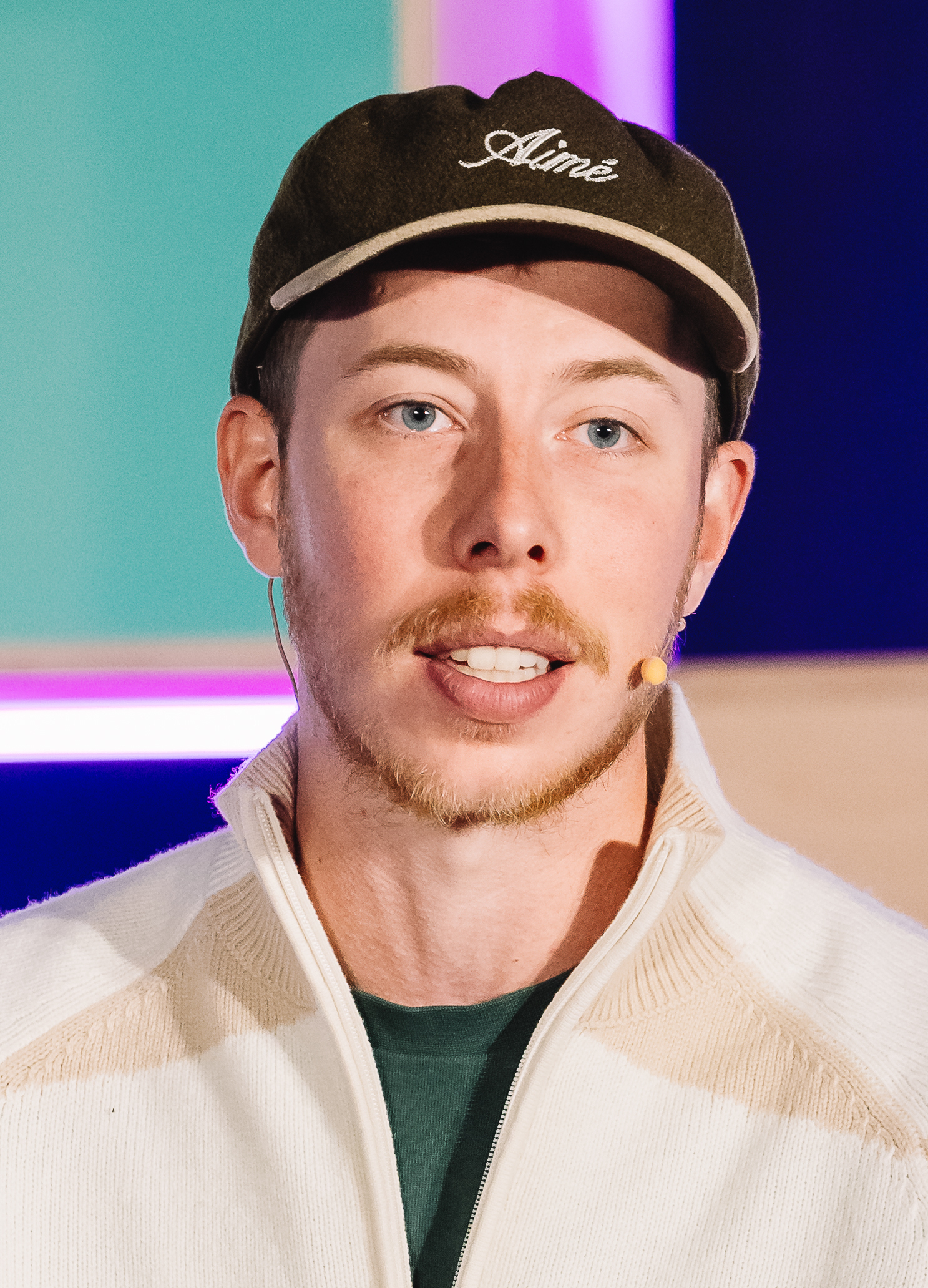
Calfreezy (pictured in 2024) is one of only two non-Sidemen members to have participated in every Sidemen Charity Match. He participated in the first five matches as a player and the two most recent matches as a manager.

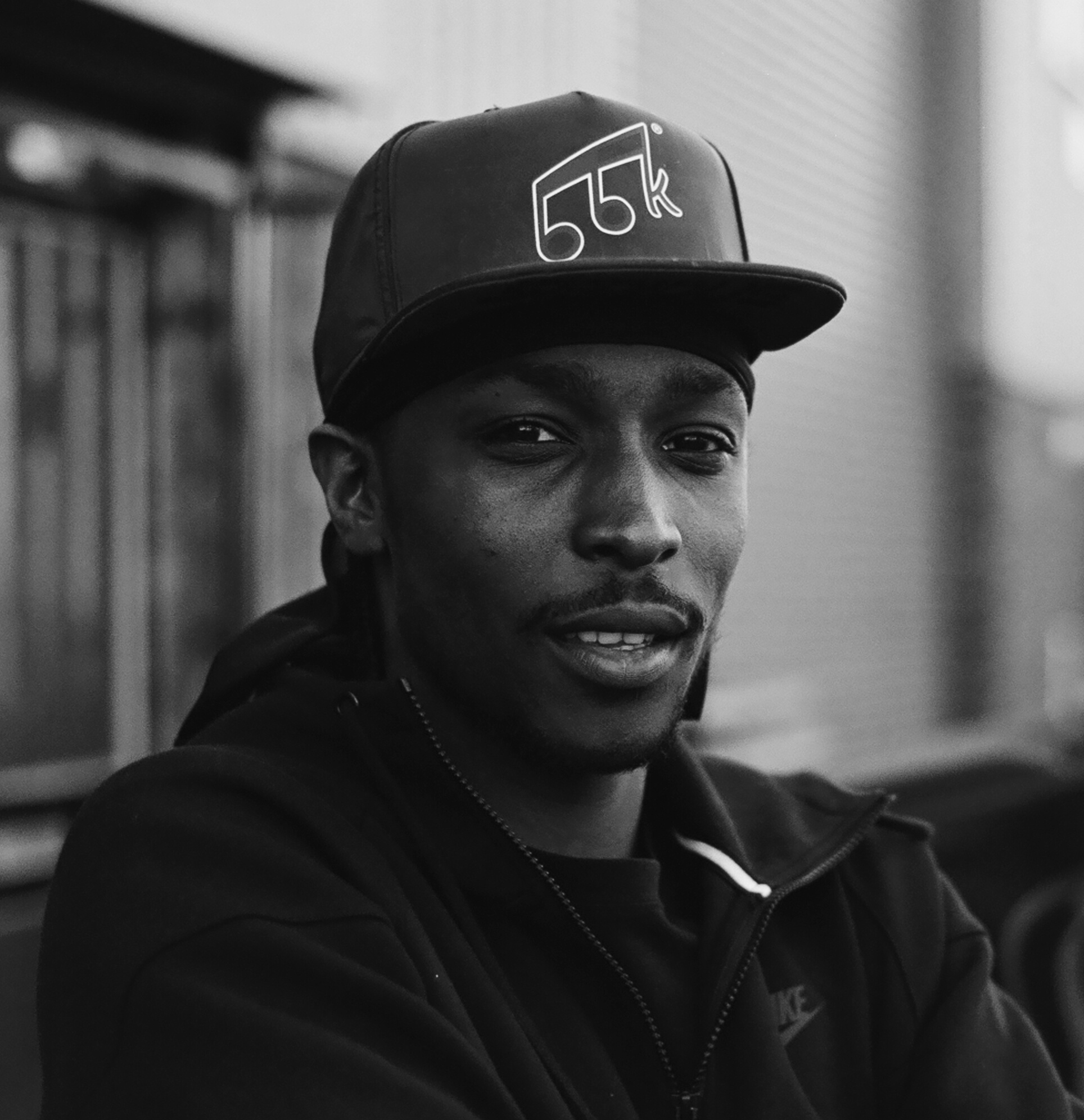
Grime MC Jme (pictured in 2015) played for Sidemen FC in the first six matches.

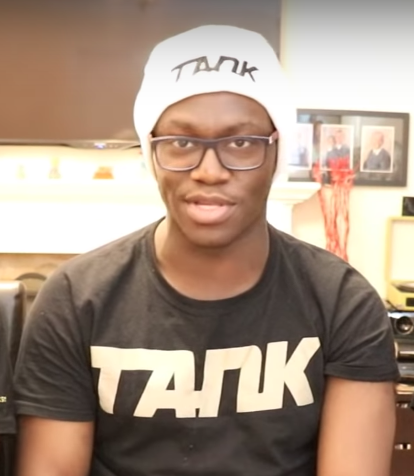
KSI's brother Deji Olatunji (pictured in 2019) has played in every match except the first one.

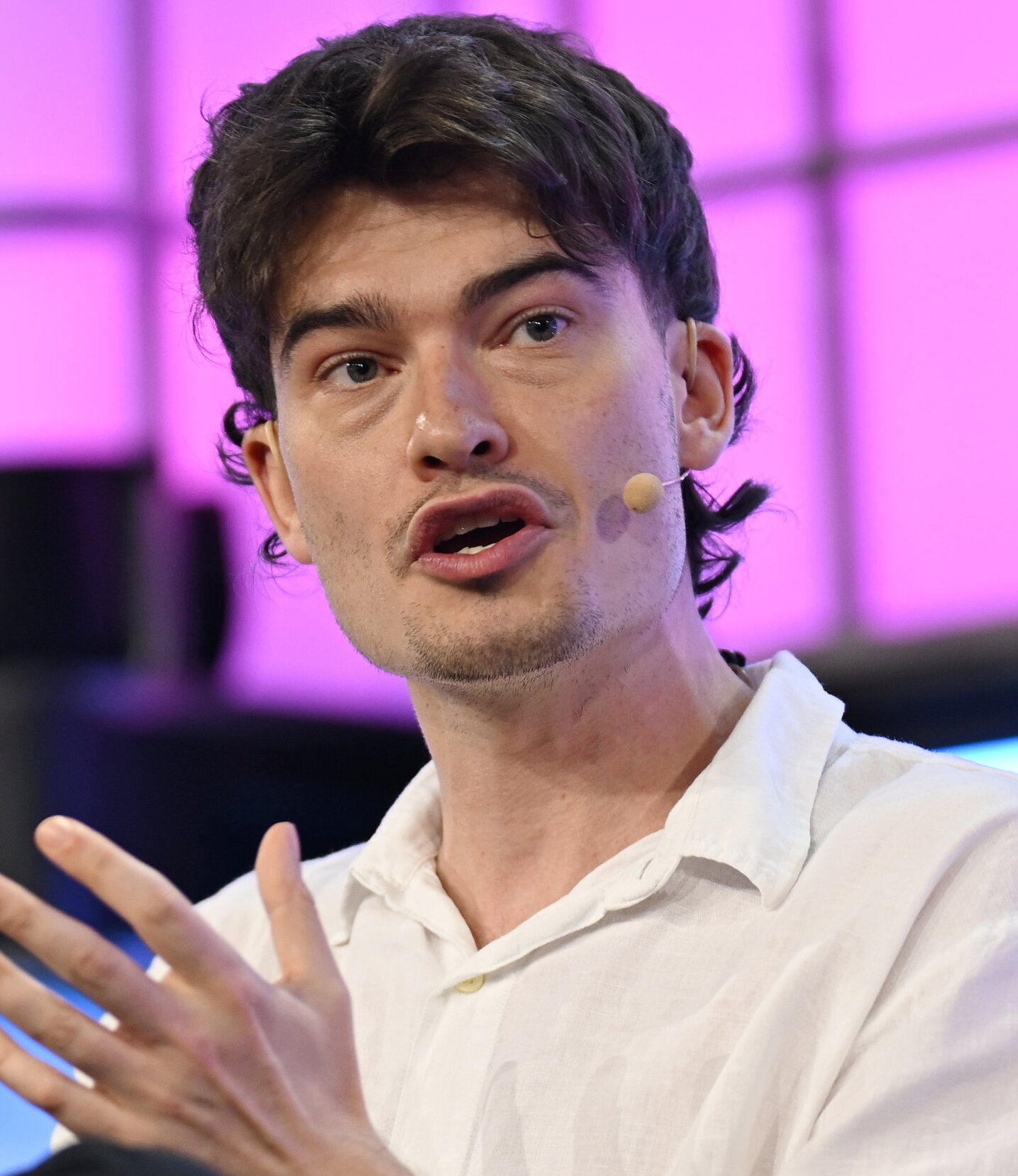
WillNE (pictured in 2025) has played in every match except the first one, all for the YouTube Allstars.

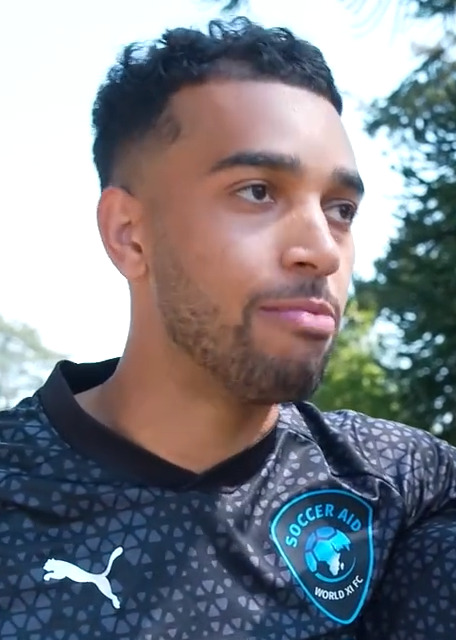
Niko Omilana (pictured at Soccer Aid 2023) has played in the four most recent matches.

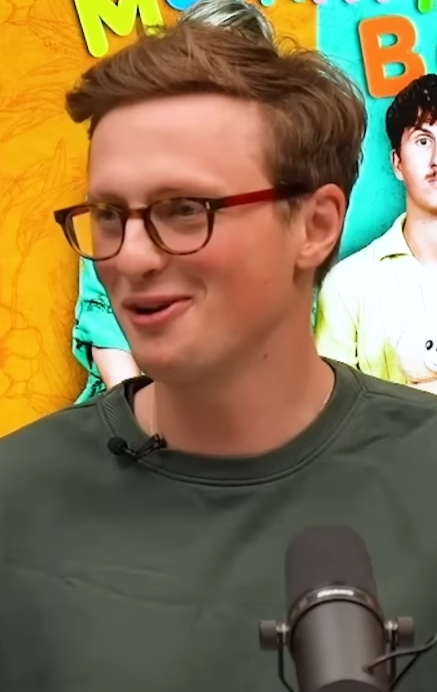
Max Fosh (pictured in 2024) has played in the three most recent matches, all for the YouTube Allstars. He's become known throughout the matches for his recurring skit in which he denies a yellow card from referee Mark Clattenburg.

Participants in the Sidemen Charity Match
| Player | 2016 | 2017 | 2018 | 2022 | 2023 | 2025 | 2026 |
|---|---|---|---|---|---|---|---|
| (England) **Behzinga** | S | S | S | S | S | S | Y |
| (England) **KSI** | S | S | S | S | S | S | Y |
| (England) **Miniminter** | S | S | S | S | S | S | Y |
| (England) **TBJZL** | S | S | S | S | S | S | S |
| (England) **Vikkstar123** | S | S | S | S | S | S | S |
| (Guernsey) **W2S** | S | S | S | S | S | S | S |
| (England) **Zerkaa** | S | S | S | S | S | S | S |
| (England) Jme | S | S | S | S | S | S | No |
| (England) HughWizzy | S | Y | Y | No | No | No | No |
| (England) Spencer FC | S | No | No | No | No | No | No |
| (England) Marcus Butler | S | Y | No | No | No | No | No |
| (England) P Money | S | S | No | No | No | No | No |
| (England) Manny | S | S | S | S | S | S | No |
| (England) Lewis Redman | S | S | No | No | No | No | No |
| (England) Bateson | S | No | No | No | No | No | No |
| (Serbia) David Vujanic | Y | S | No | No | No | No | No |
| (England) CapgunTom | Y | No | No | No | No | No | No |
| (England) Callux | Y | Y | Y | S | S | S | No |
| (England) HurderOfBuffalo | Y | No | No | No | No | No | No |
| (England) Joe Weller | Y | No | No | No | No | S | No |
| (Jersey) ChrisMD | Y | Y | Y | S | Y | Y | S |
| (Canada) BajanCanadian | Y | No | No | No | No | No | No |
| (England) Joe Sugg | Y | No | Y | No | No | No | No |
| (England) Calfreezy | Y | Y | Y | S | S | SM | YM |
| (England) Oli White | Y | Y | No | No | No | No | No |
| (England) Tobiias | Y | No | No | No | No | No | No |
| (England) JMX | Y | Y | No | No | No | No | No |
| (England) Nepenthez | Y | No | No | No | No | No | No |
| (England) AnEsonGib | Y | Y | Y | Y | No | No | No |
| (England) Poet | Y | S | No | No | No | No | No |
| (England) Charlie Morley | No | S | S | No | No | No | No |
| (South Africa) Josh Pieters | No | Y | No | No | No | No | No |
| (England) Reev | No | Y | No | No | No | No | No |
| (England) Deji | No | Y | Y | Y | S | Y | S |
| (England) WillNE | No | Y | Y | Y | Y | Y | Y |
| (South Africa) Caspar Lee | No | Y | No | No | No | No | No |
| (England) TheBurntChip | No | Y | No | No | No | YM | No |
| (United States) Castro | No | Y | No | Y | No | No | No |
| (England) Alfie Deyes | No | No | S | No | No | No | No |
| (United States) RiceGum | No | No | S | No | No | No | No |
| (United States) Adapt (Note: Known as "FaZe Adapt" prior to his departure from FaZe Clan in December 2025.) | No | No | S | No | No | No | S |
| (Australia) Lachlan Power | No | No | S | No | No | Y | No |
| (United States) Keemstar | No | No | S | No | No | No | No |
| (Iran) Mo Vlogs | No | No | Y | No | No | No | No |
| (England) Romell Henry | No | No | Y | No | No | No | No |
| (Spain) DjMaRiiO | No | No | Y | No | No | No | No |
| (Canada) King Bach | No | No | Y | No | No | No | No |
| (England) Stephen Tries (Note: Stephen Tries would also serve as commentator in matches after 2018.) | No | No | Y | No | No | No | No |
| (England) Jay Swigler | No | No | Y | No | No | No | No |
| (United States) PrestonPlayz | No | No | Y | No | No | No | No |
| (England) Pieface | No | No | No | Y | No | No | No |
| (United States) MrBeast | No | No | No | S | S | Y | No |
| (England) Karl Jacobs | No | No | No | S | Y | No | No |
| (England) Randolph | No | No | No | S | S | S | No |
| (Australia) LazarBeam | No | No | No | S | S | S | S |
| (England) Billy Wingrove | No | No | No | SM | SM | No | No |
| (England) Cal the Dragon | No | No | No | Y | No | No | No |
| (England) Harry Pinero | No | No | No | Y | No | No | No |
| (England) Theo Baker | No | No | No | Y | Y | Y | No |
| (United States) Noah Beck | No | No | No | Y | No | No | No |
| (England) Yung Filly | No | No | No | Y | Y | No | No |
| (United States) IShowSpeed | No | No | No | Y | Y | Y | No |
| (England) Chunkz | No | No | No | Y | Y | Y | No |
| (England) Niko Omilana (Note: Listed as simply "Niko" in the 2026 match.) | No | No | No | Y | Y | Y | S |
| (England) GeorgeNotFound | No | No | No | Y | No | No | No |
| (United States) Chandler Hallow | No | No | No | Y | No | No | No |
| (United States) Ava Kris Tyson | No | No | No | Y | No | No | No |
| (England) Danny Aarons | No | No | No | Y | Y | Y | Y |
| (England) Mark Goldbridge | No | No | No | YM | YM | No | No |
| (United States) Airrack | No | No | No | No | S | No | No |
| (England) Angryginge | No | No | No | No | S | Y | Y |
| (Saudi Arabia) Tareq Salameh | No | No | No | No | S | No | No |
| (Canada) xQc | No | No | No | No | Y | S | S |
| (United States) JiDion | No | No | No | No | Y | No | No |
| (England) Max Fosh | No | No | No | No | Y | Y | Y |
| (United States) Kai Cenat | No | No | No | No | Y | Y | No |
| (Kuwait) AboFlah | No | No | No | No | Y | No | No |
| (United States) Duke Dennis | No | No | No | No | Y | No | No |
| (Republic of Ireland) Jacksepticeye | No | No | No | No | Y | No | No |
| (England) Konstantin | No | No | No | No | Y | No | No |
| (United States) Mark Rober | No | No | No | No | No | S | No |
| (United States) Logan Paul | No | No | No | No | No | S | No |
| (England) George Clarke | No | No | No | No | No | S | Y |
| (England) JasonTheWeen | No | No | No | No | No | S | Y |
| (United States) Sketch | No | No | No | No | No | Y | Y |
| (United States) Fanum | No | No | No | No | No | Y | No |
| (India) CarryMinati | No | No | No | No | No | Y | Y |
| (United States) Jynxzi | No | No | No | No | No | Y | S |
| (England) Stable Ronaldo | No | No | No | No | No | Y | Y |
| (France) AmineMaTue | No | No | No | No | No | No | S |
| (Sweden) Marlon | No | No | No | No | No | No | S |
| (England) AB | No | No | No | No | No | No | S |
| (England) AJ Shabeel | No | No | No | No | No | No | S |
| (Jersey) ArthurTV | No | No | No | No | No | No | S |
| (United States) Lacy | No | No | No | No | No | No | S |
| (England) Jack Joesph | No | No | No | No | No | No | SM |
| (England) Mrwhosetheboss | No | No | No | No | No | No | Y |
| (Spain) Ibai | No | No | No | No | No | No | Y |
| (England) NYKChazza | No | No | No | No | No | No | Y |
| (England) ItalianBach | No | No | No | No | No | No | Y |
| (France) Squeezie | No | No | No | No | No | No | Y |

=== Top goalscorers ===
| Pos. | Player | Appearances | Goals |
|---|---|---|---|
| 1 | (England) **Miniminter** | 7 (2016–2026) | 14 |
| 2 | (England) Manny | 6 (2016–2025) | 7 |
| 2 | (England) **TBJZL** | 7 (2016-2026) | 7 |
| 3 | (Jersey) ChrisMD | 7 (2016–2026) | 6 |
| 4 | (England) Theo Baker | 3 (2022–2025) | 4 |
| 4 | (England) Niko Omilana | 4 (2022–2026) | 4 |
| 5 | (England) Joe Weller | 2 (2016, 2025) | 3 |
| 5 | (England) **KSI** | 7 (2016–2026) | 3 |
| 5 | (England) **Vikkstar123** | 7 (2016–2026) | 3 |
| 5 | (England) Chunkz | 3 (2022–2025) | 3 |
| 6 | (United States) Castro | 2 (2017, 2022) | 2 |
| 6 | (England) WillNE | 6 (2017–2026) | 2 |
| 6 | (England) **Behzinga** | 7 (2016–2026) | 2 |
| 6 | (England) **Zerkaa** | 7 (2016–2026) | 2 |
| 6 | (England) Angryginge | 3 (2023–2026) | 2 |
| 6 | (United States) Jynxzi | 2 (2025–2026) | 2 |
| 6 | (England) ItalianBach | 1 (2026) | 2 |
| 7 | (England) JMX | 2 (2016–2017) | 1 |
| 7 | (England) Yung Filly | 2 (2022–2023) | 1 |
| 7 | (England) Max Fosh | 3 (2023–2026) | 1 |
| 7 | (Guernsey) **W2S** | 7 (2016–2026) | 1 |
| 7 | (Saudi Arabia) Tareq Salameh | 1 (2023) | 1 |
| 7 | (United States) Logan Paul | 1 (2025) | 1 |
| 7 | (United States) IShowSpeed | 3 (2022–2025) | 1 |
| 7 | (United States) Kai Cenat | 2 (2023–2025) | 1 |
| 7 | (England) George Clarke | 2 (2025–2026) | 1 |
| 7 | (Sweden) Marlon | 1 (2026) | 1 |
| 7 | (England) Danny Aarons | 4 (2022–2026) | 1 |
| 7 | (England) NYKChazza | 1 (2026) | 1 |
| 7 | (England) AJ Shabeel | 1 (2026) | 1 |
| 7 | (England) AB | 1 (2026) | 1 |

Key: Bold indicates a Sidemen member.

=== Guinness World Records ===
| Publication | Year | World record | Record holder | R. Status | Ref. |
|---|---|---|---|---|---|
| Guinness World Records | 2022 | Most viewers for a charity sports match live stream on YouTube | Sidemen | Record | |

== Gallery ==
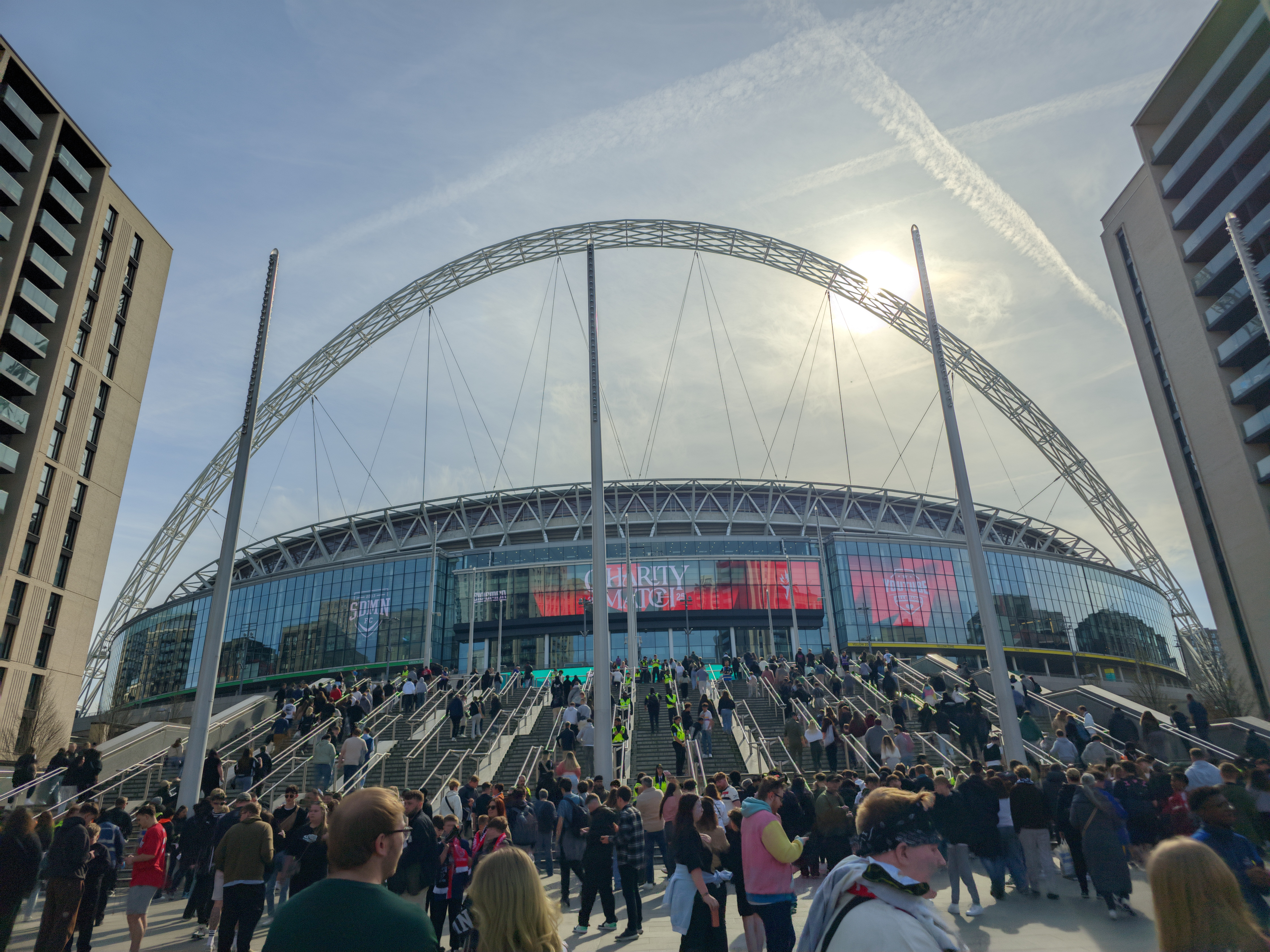
Wembley Stadium prior to the 2025 edition

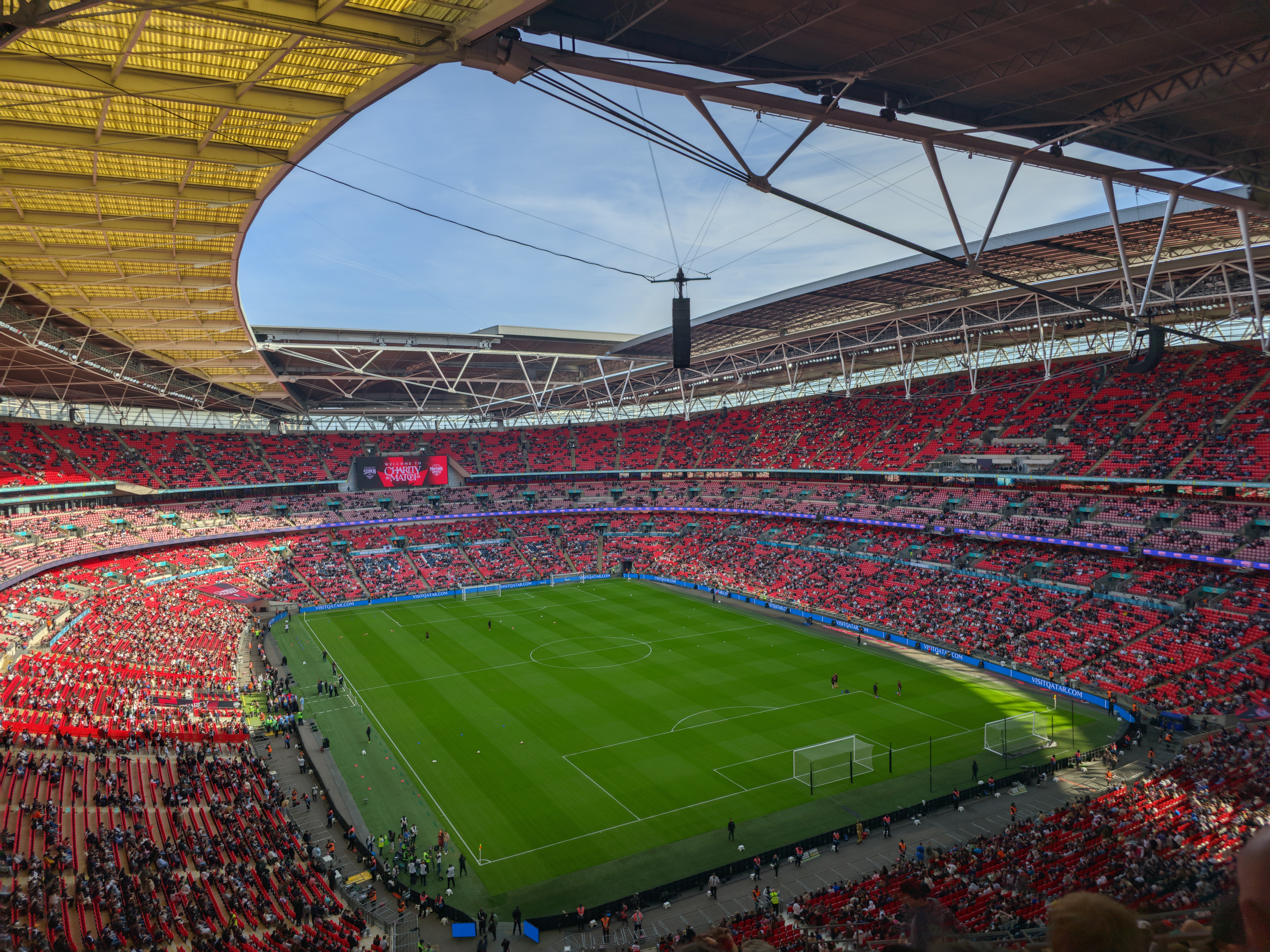
Inside of Wembley Stadium before the 2025 edition

Sketch saving a penalty from Miniminter during the 2025 penalty shootout

YouTube Allstars celebrate winning the 2025 Sidemen Charity Match
