= Mark Goldbridge =

English YouTube personality

- Born: Brent Di Cesare; 7 April 1979 (age 47); Nottingham, England
- Occupations: YouTube personality; presenter; police officer (former)

YouTube information
- Channels: The United Stand; Overlap Daily; The United Stand XTRA; Mark Goldbridge
- Years active: 2013–present
- Genre: Association football
- Subscribers: 2.25 million (main channel); 4.51 million (combined) (Note: Includes his other 3 channels: "Overlap Daily", "Mark Goldbridge That's Entertainment!" and "Mark Goldbridge".)
- Views: 1.82 billion (main channel); 2.62 billion (combined)
- Last updated: 24 April 2026

Brent Di Cesare (born 7 April 1979), known by his online pseudonym Mark Goldbridge, is an English YouTuber known for hosting The United Stand, a fan channel for the Premier League football club Manchester United.

== Personal life ==
Goldbridge was born Brent Di Cesare on 7 April 1979 in Nottingham and attended Toot Hill School in Bingham, Nottinghamshire. He lives in Solihull as of 2019.

He has stated that he created the alias when he started his YouTube career. This alias was used at the request of his employers during his job as a police officer investigating financial fraud.

He has a son named Seb.

== YouTube career ==
Goldbridge has four YouTube channels: "The United Stand", which consists of Manchester United content; "Overlap Daily", which consists of general football content and watchalongs of non-Manchester United matches; "The United Stand XTRA", which consists of clips from his recent livestreams; and "Mark Goldbridge", which includes more personal content such as cooking, vlogging and general chit-chats.

Goldbridge started The United Stand in 2014 under the name "Soccer Box TV", providing videos on Premier League match predictions. He then switched his content to post-match reactions of Manchester United games. Later, Goldbridge started live streaming watchalongs of the matches. BBC Sport has described these as "an amateur online version of Sky Sports' Soccer Saturday". In April 2022, Goldbridge made his Talksport debut, presenting a late-night show.

In September 2022, Goldbridge was invited to be one of the managers in the Sidemen charity match. There were two teams in the charity match. Sidemen FC which included the Sidemen and a few select influencers, including MrBeast and LazarBeam. The other team was the YouTube All Stars which included social media influencers such as IShowSpeed and Noah Beck. Goldbridge managed the YouTube All Stars, who lost 8–7 to Sidemen FC. In total, they raised over £1,000,000 for their select charities.

In March 2023, Goldbridge held his first-ever live shows with The United Stand. The shows took place in Dublin, Manchester and London.

In September 2023, Goldbridge was back for the Sidemen Charity Match as manager of YouTube All Stars, where they raised over £2,400,000 in just two hours. The Sidemen won the match, beating the YouTube All Stars 8–5. Miniminter, W2S and Behzinga were all on the score sheet for Sidemen FC, while ChrisMD, Max Fosh and Niko Omilana were on target for the All-Stars.

In November 2023, Goldbridge raised over £52,000 for the end-of-life charity Marie Curie. This was part of his yearly charity live stream, which saw Goldbridge participate in a number of video games on YouTube for 24 hours.

In August 2025, Goldbridge became one of the rights holders for the 2025–26 Bundesliga, with broadcasts airing on "That's Football". Goldbridge's "That's Football" channel, along with "The Overlap", acquired rights to broadcast 20 live Friday night Bundesliga matches during the 2025–26 season.

Both of Goldbridge's football channels were acquired by "The Overlap" on 14 April 2026.
