= Inside (web series) =

British reality competition series

- Genre: Reality competition
- Created by: Sidemen
- Creative director: Chris Trapo
- Presented by: Joshua Bradley; Tobi Brown; Simon Minter; Olajide Olatunji; Ethan Payne; Vikram Barn; Harry Lewis
- Narrated by: Stephen Tries
- Opening theme: "Funky Friday" by Fredo & Dave (series 1); "Himothy" by Katori Walker (series 2 -)
- Ending theme: "Himothy" by Katori Walker
- Country of origin: United Kingdom
- Original language: English
- No. of series: 5
- No. of episodes: 41

Production
- Executive producers: Joshua Bradley; Tobi Brown; Simon Minter; Olajide Olatunji; Ethan Payne; Vikram Barn; Harry Lewis; Victor Bengtsson; Ryan O'Shea; George Cowin
- Producers: Jack Richardson; Kyle Legg
- Cinematography: Tom Hawes
- Editors: Freddie Scott-Miller (lead Sidemen editor); Marcus Bowerman; JJ Coffey; Usama Sarwar; Jemima Sucu; Bill K; Laurence Earnshaw; Kjerand Nilsen Reianes; Lewis Mann; Mark Prouse
- Running time: 27–127 minutes
- Production company: Cowshed Collective

Original release
- Network: YouTube and Side+ (Note: The first and final episodes were published on the Sidemen's main YouTube channel (@Sidemen). All other episodes were published on the More Sidemen YouTube channel (@MoreSidemen). Extended versions were also released on Side+ at the same time as the standard versions on YouTube.)
- Release: 2 June – 9 June 2024
- Network: Netflix
- Release: 17 March 2025 – present

Inside (stylised as InSIDE) is a reality competition web series created and hosted by British YouTube group the Sidemen, first premiered on 2 June 2024 on the Sidemen YouTube channel. The series features celebrity and internet personality contestants who compete in challenges to secure a prize fund totalled at £1 million, with everything they buy or do costing money from the prize fund.

From the second series, it was acquired globally by Netflix, who also commissioned an American version of the show, Inside: USA, which premiered in 2025. For the first two series of Inside, the finalists faced a split or steal decision with the remaining prize fund. However, this changed from series three, with only one contestant being eligible to win the series. A second spin-off series, Outside (stylized as OutSIDE), premiered in September 2026.

== History ==
Contestants are selected to stay in a house for a week where they compete in various challenges throughout their stay. Failure in these challenges results in the loss of money from the final prize. In addition to this, contestants are given access to a tuck shop, which features a small selection of goods. The cost of the products is taken from the prize fund, with the items having a significant markup in order to deter contestants from getting them. The first two series of Inside ended with the finalists getting a choice to split or steal the remaining prize fund. This was changed from the third series, with only one contestant eligible to win the prize fund.

The first series aired on YouTube and Side+ in 2024, but Inside moved to Netflix from the second series in 2025, with companion shows available on Side+. In November 2024, the Sidemen announced an American spin-off series, Inside: USA, also produced for Netflix. The second series premiered on 16 March 2025, while the first series of Inside: USA was released on 21 September 2025. The third series aired in March 2026.

In August 2026, the Sidemen and Netflix announced a spin-off series called Outside, which premiered on September 28. The series was filmed prior to KSI's departure with the Sidemen.

== Series overview ==
=== Original ===
Series	Days	Housemates	Episodes	Originally released			Winner(s)	Runner-up	Remaining prize fund
Series	Days	Housemates	Episodes	First released	Last released	Network	Winner(s)	Runner-up	Remaining prize fund
1	7	10	8	2 June 2024	9 June 2024	YouTube; Side+	Chloe Burrows & Manrika Khaira	Liv Bentley	£151,458
2	7	12	8	17 March 2025	23 March 2025	Netflix	Cinna Brit, Mya Mills & PK Humble	DDG	£293,672
3	7	12	8	23 March 2026	29 March 2026	Netflix	Eddie Hall	Marlon	£177,894

=== Inside: USA ===
Series	Days	Housemates	Episodes	Originally released			Winner(s)	Runner-up	Remaining prize fund
Series	Days	Housemates	Episodes	First released	Last released	Network	Winner(s)	Runner-up	Remaining prize fund
1	7	12	9	21 September 2025	28 September 2025	Netflix	Aisha Mian	Zach Justice	$303,050

=== Outside ===
Series	Days	Campers	Episodes	Originally released			Winner(s)	Runner-up	Remaining prize fund
Series	Days	Campers	Episodes	First released	Last released	Network	Winner(s)	Runner-up	Remaining prize fund
1	7	12	8	28 September 2026	1 October 2026	Netflix	Joshua "Chip" Larkin	Dani Babes	£158,400

== Contestants ==
=== Series 1 ===
Name	Age on entry	Notability	Hometown	Day entered	Day exited	Result	Ref.
Chloe Burrows	28	Television personality	Bicester	1	7	Winner	
Manrika Khaira	28	The Circle star	Birmingham	1	7	Winner	
Olivia "Liv" Bentley	28	Made in Chelsea cast member	Chelsea	1	7	3rd place	
Fanum	26	Streamer	New York City	1	7	4th place	
Specs Gonzalez	43	TikToker and comedian	London	1	7	5th place	
Nifè	28	Dancer	London	1	6	Eliminated	
Castillo	35	Internet personality and rapper	London	1	6	Eliminated	
Angryginge	22	Streamer and internet personality	Salford	1	6	Self-elimination	
Leah Halton	23	Social media influencer	Melbourne	1	4	Eliminated	
Joe Weller	28	YouTuber, boxer and media personality	Eastbourne	1	3	Eliminated	

=== Series 2 ===
Name	Age on entry	Notability	Hometown	Day entered	Day exited	Result	Ref.
Cinna Brit	27	Streamer	Virginia	1	7	Winner	
PK Humble	27	Non-League footballer and TikToker	North London	1	7	Winner	
Mya Mills	23	Fashion model and internet personality	Essex	1	7	Winner	
DDG	27	YouTuber and rapper	Pontiac, Michigan	1	7	4th place	
George Clarke	24	TikToker and YouTuber	Bristol	1	7	5th place	
Jason Nguyen	20	Streamer	Arlington, Texas	1	7	6th place	
Whitney Adebayo	26	Television personality	Camden Town	1	6	Eliminated	
Farah Shams	24	TikToker	Isleworth	1	6	Eliminated	
Milli Jo Mcloughlin	21	TikToker	Liverpool	1	5	Eliminated	
Patrice Evra	43	Former professional footballer	Dakar	1	4	Eliminated	
Mandi Vakili	32	Podcaster	London	1	3	Eliminated	
Dylan Page	25	TikToker	South Africa	1	3	Eliminated	

=== Series 3 ===
Name	Age on entry	Notability	Hometown	Day entered	Day exited	Result	Ref.
Eddie Hall	37	Former World's Strongest Man	Newcastle-under-Lyme	1	7	Winner	
Marlon Garcia	24	Streamer and Model	Malmö	1	7	2nd place	
Alhan Gençay	26	Presenter and entrepreneur	London	1	7	3rd place	
Ben Azelart	23	YouTuber	Dallas, Texas	1	7	4th place	
Chloe Ferry	30	Television personality	Newcastle upon Tyne	1	7	5th place	
Saffron Barker	25	Lifestyle creator	Brighton	1	7	6th place	
Indiyah Polack	26	Television personality	London	1	6	Eliminated	
Chian Reynolds	35	Digital personality and journalist	London	1	6	Eliminated	
Expressions Oozing	32	Football pundit	London	1	5	Eliminated	
Anna Malygon	22	Content creator and model	Kharkiv	1	5	Eliminated	
Alfie "AB" Buttle	22	Content creator and podcaster	Yorkshire	1	3	Eliminated	
Lydia Violet	22	Gaming and cosplay creator	London	1	2	Eliminated	

=== Inside: USA series 1 ===
Name	Age on entry	Notability	Hometown	Day entered	Day exited	Result	Ref.
Aisha Mian	24	Social media personality	New York City	1	7	Winner	
Zach Justice	29	Actor and comedian	Las Vegas	1	7	2nd place	
Mark Estes	25	Social media personality	Nashville, Tennessee	1	7	3rd place	
Dwight Howard	39	Former professional basketball player	Atlanta	1	7	4th place	
Sydney Thomas	21	Social media personality	St. Louis	1	7	5th place	
Ekin-Su Cülcüloğlu	31	Television personality and actress	Islington	1	7	6th place	
Bre Tiesi	34	Model and real estate agent	California	1	6	Eliminated	
Fannita Leggett	27	Social media personality	Alabama	1	6	Eliminated	
Max Fosh	30	YouTuber and comedian	Lambeth	1	5	Eliminated	
Sketch	26	Streamer	Houston	1	4	Eliminated	
Alissa Violet	29	Actress and model	Brunswick, Ohio	1	4	Eliminated	
Jay Cinco	23	Rapper	California	1	2	Eliminated	

=== Outside series 1 ===
Name	Age on entry	Notability	Hometown	Day entered	Day exited	Result	Ref.
Joshua "Chip" Larkin	32	Social media personality	Manchester	1	7	Winner	
Dani Babes	23	Social media personality	England	1	7	2nd place	
Moyo J. Ajibade	27	TikToker	England	1	7	3rd place	
Heinz Baines	23	YouTuber	Derry	1	7	4th place	
Kaci Jay	21	YouTuber	England	1	7	5th place	
Lacy	23	Streamer	Erie, Pennsylvania	1	7	6th place	
Paigey Cakey	29	Rapper	London	1	6	Eliminated	
Chloe Veitch	27	Model and media personality	Essex	1	6	Eliminated	
Louis Russell	25	Model and social media	Hampshire	1	5	Eliminated	
Yonna Jay	19	Streamer	Asheville, North Carolina	1	4	Eliminated	
Matt Morsia	40	YouTuber and bodybuilder	Barnet	1	3	Eliminated	
Sara Saffari	25	Fitness influencer	Kentucky	1	2	Eliminated	
