= MOBO Awards 2021 =

2021 edition of award ceremony

- Date: 5 December 2021
- Location: Coventry Building Society Arena, Coventry, England
- Hosted by: Leigh-Anne Pinnock; Munya Chawawa; Eddie Kadi (special guest)
- Website: mobo.com

Television/radio coverage
- Network: YouTube (live coverage); BBC One (highlights)

MOBO Awards 2021 ceremony was held at the Coventry Building Society Arena in Coventry on 5 December 2021. The ceremony streamed live on YouTube and the highlights of the ceremony were shown on BBC One three days later.

The nominees were announced on 11 November 2021, led by rapper Dave with five nominations. Central Cee and Wizkid won the most awards of the night with two each. The ceremony honoured former heavyweight boxer Frank Bruno for his work in raising awareness of mental health issues.

== Performers ==
The performers for the ceremony were announced on 24 November 2021.

List of performers at the MOBO Awards 2021
Artist(s)	Song(s)
Bree Runway	"Hot Hot"
Pa Salieu	"Frontline" "Gliding" "My Family"
Ghetts	"Mozambique" "Hop Out"
Tems	"Crazy Tings" "Higher"
NSG	"Petite"
Potter Payper	"Purpose" "Gangsteritus"
ENNY	"Peng Black Girls"
Stefflon Don Ms Banks	"Dip"

== Winners and nominees ==
Winners appear first and highlighted in bold.

**Album of the Year**: **We're All Alone in This Together – Dave**; Collapsed in Sunbeams – Arlo Parks; Conflict of Interest – Ghetts; Edna – Headie One; Mother – Cleo Sol; Not Your Muse – Celeste	**Song of the Year**: **"Body (Remix)" – Russ Millions and Tion Wayne featuring ArrDee, Bugzy Malone, Buni, Darkoo, E1, Fivio Foreign & ZT**; "Clash" – Dave featuring Stormzy; "Commitment Issues" – Central Cee; "Latest Trends" – A1 x J1; "My Family" – Pa Salieu featuring BackRoad Gee; "Peng Black Girls" – ENNY featuring Amia Brave
**Best Newcomer**: **Central Cee**; Arlo Parks; ArrDee; BackRoad Gee; Berwyn; ENNY; Joy Crookes; Midas the Jagaban; PinkPantheress; Wes Nelson	**Video of the Year**: **M1llionz – "Lagga" (Director: Teeeezy C)**; Bree Runway – "Hot Hot" (Director: Jocelyn Anquetil); Fredo featuring Dave – "Money Talks" (Director: Edem Wornoo); Little Simz featuring Cleo Sol – "Woman" (Director: Little Simz); Pa Salieu featuring BackRoad Gee – "My Family" (Director: Femi Ladi); Slowthai featuring ASAP Rocky – "Mazza" (Director: The Rest)
**Best Female Act**: **Little Simz**; Arlo Parks; Bree Runway; Cleo Sol; Shaybo; Tiana Major9	**Best Male Act**: **Ghetts**; AJ Tracey; Central Cee; Dave; Headie One; Potter Payper
**Best Grime Act**: **Skepta**; Bugzy Malone; Chip; D Double E; Frisco; Ghetts	**Best Soul/R&B Act**: **Cleo Sol**; Bellah; Jorja Smith; Sault; Tiana Major9; WSTRN
**Best Hip Hop Act**: **D-Block Europe**; Dave; Fredo; Little Simz; Potter Payper; Slowthai	**Best Drill Act**: **Central Cee**; Digga D; Headie One; K-Trap; Loski; M1llionz; Russ Millions; SR; Tion Wayne; Unknown T
**Best International Act**: **Wizkid**; Doja Cat; Drake; Kanye West; Lil Nas X; Megan Thee Stallion; Polo G; Rema; Skillibeng; Young Stoner Life (Young Thug & Gunna)	**Best Gospel Act**: **Guvna B**; CalledOut Music; CeCe Winans; Kirk Franklin; Maverick City Music; SO
**Best African Music Act**: **Wizkid**; Ayra Starr; Burna Boy; CKay; Davido; King Promise; NSG; Rema; Tems; Tiwa Savage	**Best Reggae Act**: **Shenseea**; Lila Iké; Popcaan; Sean Paul; Skillibeng; Spice
**Best Jazz Act**: **Sons of Kemet**; Alfa Mist; Blue Lab Beats; Emma-Jean Thackray; Jacob Collier; Nubiyan Twist	**Best Producer**: **Jae5**; Gotcha; Juls; M1OnTheBeat; P2J; TSB
**Best Performance in a TV Show/Film**: **Micheal Ward – Small Axe as Franklyn**; Damson Idris – Snowfall as Franklin Saint; Daniel Kaluuya – Judas and the Black Messiah as Fred Hampton; Ashley Thomas – Them as Henry Emory; Letitia Wright – Small Axe as Altheia Jones	**Best Media Personality**: **Chunkz & Yung Filly**; Charlene White; Harry Pinero; Henrie Kwushue; Julie Adenuga; Maya Jama; Mo Gilligan; Munya Chawawa; Nella Rose; Zeze Millz
**MOBO Impact Award** **Frank Bruno**
