= Harry Pinero =

British YouTuber (born 1991)

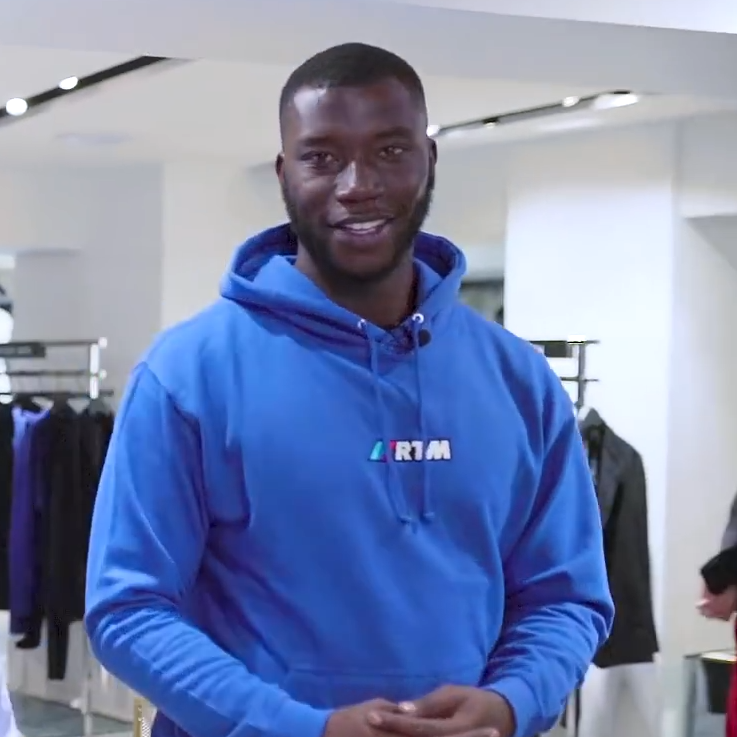
- Pinero in 2019
- Born: 6 May 1991 (age 35); Peckham, London, England
- Occupations: YouTuber; Internet personality; television presenter
- Children: 1

YouTube information
- Channel: Harry Pinero
- Years active: 2018–present
- Subscribers: 863 thousand
- Views: 197.1 million
- Last updated: 25 February 2026

Harry Pinero (born 6 May 1991) is a British YouTuber and television presenter.

== Early life ==
Pinero was born on 6 May 1991 in Peckham, London, to parents who immigrated from Sierra Leone. He and his family lived in Bermondsey. He had worked various jobs before joining YouTube: as a mentor in a prison, at a Co-op, and at a tech company.

== Career ==
In 2018, Pinero began hosting Talent Hunt for Link Up TV. He posted his first YouTube video in 2019. In 2020, he and Henrie Kwushue began hosting Who We Be Talks, a Spotify podcast. In April 2021, he co-hosted the virtual London Football Awards with Alex Scott. In November 2022, he appeared in a Christmas advert for JD Sports. In September 2024, he and Yung Filly launched a secret sauce with Heinz. He hosts a football podcast on YouTube titled The Inside Scoop with Culture Cams.

=== Charity work ===
In September 2022, he participated in the Sidemen Charity Match as part of team YouTube Allstars. On 14 February 2025, Pinero participated in "Match for Hope 2025", a football charity event hosted in Doha, Qatar, as a player for team Chunkz & IShowSpeed, facing off against team AboFlah & KSI. The match ended with team AboFlah & KSI's 6–5 victory over team Chunkz & IShowSpeed. The event raised more than $10.7 million for charity.

== Personal life ==
Pinero is Muslim. He has a son with singer Miraa May. He is a supporter of Manchester United F.C.

== Filmography ==
=== Film ===
Year	Title	Role	Notes	Ref.
2023	Gassed Up	Himself	Cameo	

=== Television ===
Year	Title	Role	Network	Notes	Ref.
2019	The Rap Game UK	Himself	BBC Three	Guest; 1 episode	
2022	The Weakest Link	Himself	BBC One	Contestant; 1 episode	
2023	The Wheel	Himself	BBC One	Contestant; 1 episode	
2024	Celebrity Mastermind	Himself	BBC One	Contestant; 1 episode	
2024	Cooking with the Stars	Himself	ITV	Contestant; 1 episode	
2026	Catchphrase	Himself	ITV	Contestant; Series 11 Episode 10	

=== Music videos ===
Year	Title	Artist(s)	Role	Ref.
2021	"Conga"	Meek Mill, Leslie Grace & Boi-1da	Himself	
2022	"Don't Lie"	A1 x J1 feat. Nemzzz	Himself	

== Awards and nominations ==
Ceremony	Year	Category	Recipient(s)	Result	Ref.
MOBO Awards	2020	Best Media Personality	Himself	Nominated	
MOBO Awards	2021	Best Media Personality	Himself	Nominated	
MOBO Awards	2022	Best Media Personality	Himself	Nominated	
GUAP Gala Awards	2023	Presenter of the Year	Himself	Won	
Broadcast Digital Awards	2024	Best Short Form Documentary Programme	When Harry Met...The Far Right Rally	Won	
