= Leah Halton =

Australian influencer and model (born 2001)

- Born: Leah Lucia Halton; January 6, 2001 (age 25); Melbourne, Australia
- Occupations: Influencer; model
- Years active: 2014–present
- Height: 1.63 m (5 ft 4 in)

Leah Lucia Halton (born January 6, 2001) is an Australian social media influencer and model. She is best known as the "Queen of Coachella" and rose to prominence after she went viral for a lip-sync video to YG Marley's popular song "Praise Jah in the Moonlight". The original TikTok video currently has over a billion views and 70 million likes, becoming the most liked video on the platform.

== Life and career ==
Halton was born in Melbourne, Australia, to a British-French mother and a British-Mauritian father. She grew up surrounded by animals and often features her pets including her dogs Shiloh and Pablo, and her cat Prada in her posts.

Halton created content on YouTube and TikTok with millions of followers and likes. In 2020, she once collaborated with famous beauty Influencer in a YouTube video James Charles. In 2023, she hosts a podcast titled "Sleepover Party", where she discusses relationships, friendship and everyday experiences audiences.

Halton achieved a major breakthrough in February 2024, when a lip-sync performance to YG Marley’s track Praise Jah in the Moonlight went viral amassing 1.3 billion of views, 77 million likes and dramatically increasing her followers count. The same year, she participated in the Sidemen reality series Inside series 1 by Sidemen which introduced her to an even wider international audience. She won TikTok Awards Australia for the Video Of The Year. She was featured with Kylie Minogue, Kate Moss and more stars for Charlotte Tilbury Beauty first variety beauty show. In late 2024, she collaborated with two clothing brands include Beginning Boutique for Leah Halton x Beginning Boutique collection and Fashion Nova.

In 2025, Halton collaborated with a fashion brand Princess Polly for Leah Halton x Princess Polly collection as was her dream collaboration. In August, she signed with the global talent and sports agency United Talent Agency (UTA) for global representation. She won the Video of the Year at the TikTok Awards Australia for the second time. In April 2026, she posted a selfie video from WrestleMania 42 featuring IShowSpeed's splash on Logan Paul, which received significant engagement on social media.

== Public image ==
Halton was named one of Top 10 Australian Instagram Influencers spotted the first position. She won the TikTok Awards Australia two times for the Video of the Year. Her video on TikTok of a lip-sync performance to YG Marley song "Praise Jah in the Moonlight" is currently one of the most viewed and liked videos on the platform with billions of views, surpassing the previous most liked lip-synching video of Bella Poarch.

In April 2026, Halton attended the Coachella 2026 in the Los Angeles and she was named the "most beautiful girl alive", "bella of Coachella" and the "Queen of Coachella".

== Filmography ==
Year	Film	Role	Notes
2024	Inside	Contestant	Series 1

== Awards and nominations ==
Association	Year	Category	Nominated works	Result	Ref.
TikTok Awards Australia	2024	Video of the Year	Herself	Won	
TikTok Awards Australia	2025	Video of the Year	Herself	Won	
