= Sketch (streamer) =

American Twitch Streamer and YouTuber

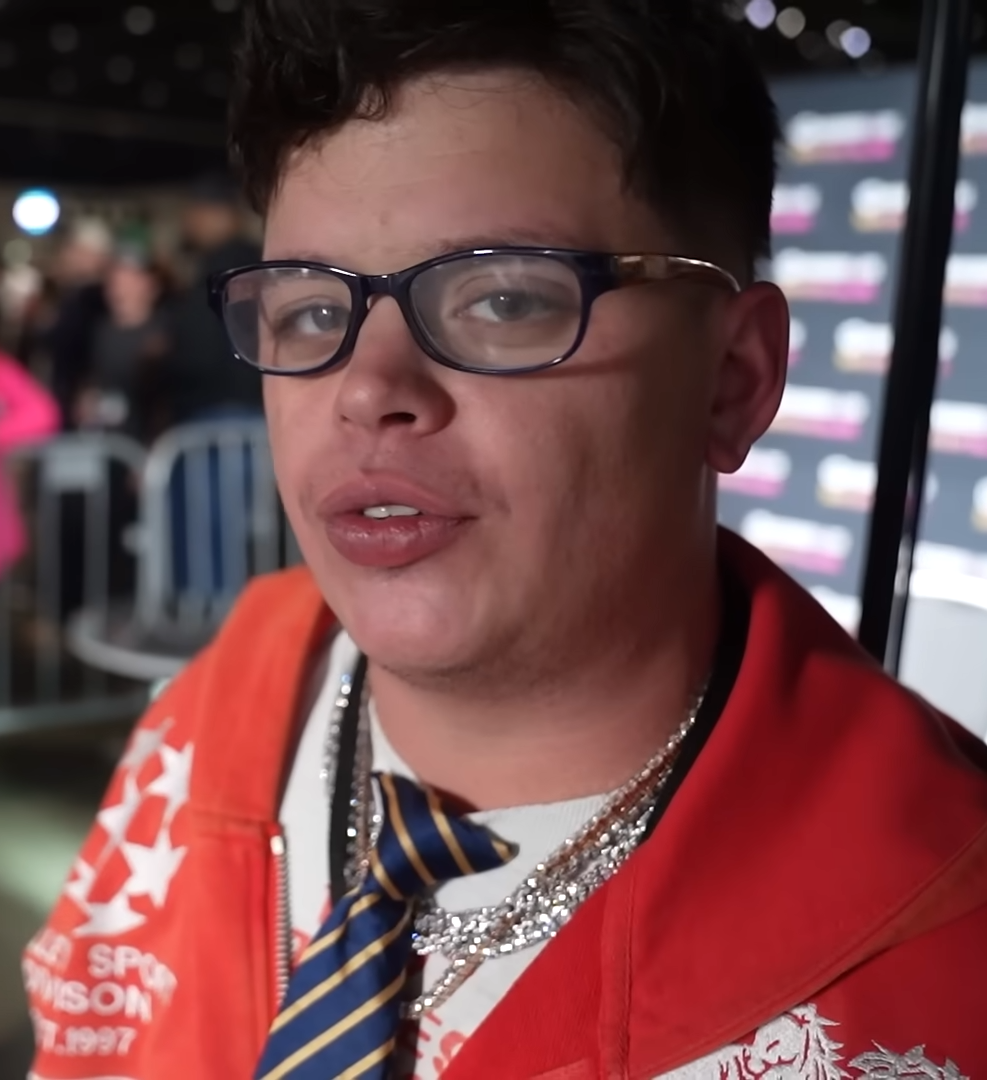
- Cox in 2026
- Born: Kylie Cox; 1998 or 1999 (age 27–28); Houston, Texas, U.S.
- Occupations: Twitch streamer; YouTuber

Twitch information
- Channel: thesketchreal
- Years active: 2023–present
- Genre: Gaming
- Game: Madden NFL
- Followers: 1 million

YouTube information
- Channel: TheSketchReal
- Years active: 2023–present
- Genre: Gaming
- Subscribers: 781 thousand
- Views: 411 million
- Last updated: February 8, 2026

Kylie Cox (born 1998 or 1999), known online as Sketch or TheSketchReal, is an American Twitch streamer and YouTuber. He is well known for his catchphrase, "What's up, brother?", which went viral and became a trend on the short-form video platform TikTok in 2024. He was named Best Sports Streamer and nominated for Best Breakout Streamer at the 2024 Streamer Awards.

== Early life ==
Cox was born around 1998 to 1999 in Houston, Texas.

Cox attended the Woodlands Christian Academy and played linebacker for the school's football team. He went to Mississippi State University, then transferred to the University of Oklahoma, Texas State University, and, eventually, Lone Star College before deciding to leave academics.

From 2020 to 2023, Cox worked in real estate before his career in gaming.

== Online career ==
=== 2023: Early career ===
Cox started streaming on TikTok playing Madden NFL 24, an American football video game. He then later began dual-streaming on both TikTok and Twitch in July 2023. Later in November 2023, he began publishing his content on YouTube, posting Madden NFL 24 gameplay and vlog videos.

=== 2024–present: TikTok viral and collaborations ===
On April 24, 2024, the Houston Texans revealed on Twitter that Cox would announce one of their 2024 NFL draft picks. Later, on April 27, 2024, Cox announced the Houston Texans fourth-round pick, as the Texans selected Ohio State's Cade Stover with pick No. 123.

In May 2024, Cox participated in the AT&T Annihilator Cup, a livestreamed gaming tournament hosted by AT&T. In June 2024, Cox appeared alongside other streamers in the official trailer for Fortnite Reload, a new game mode for Fortnite. In July 2024, Cox was featured in an advertisement video promoting Sidemen's Best Cereal. On July 13, he appeared in a MrBeast video titled "50 YouTubers Fight for $1,000,000".

In November 2024, he was ranked 14th by Complex Networks in its list of "The 25 Best Streamers Right Now". Later that month, he was ranked fifth by Dexerto on its list of "The 10 best Streamers of 2024".

In December 2024, he won Best Sports Streamer at the 2024 Streamer Awards and was also nominated for Best Breakout Streamer.

Cox has been involved in various golf content online and participated in the inaugural Internet Invitational organized by Barstool Sports.

Cox saving Miniminter's penalty in the Sidemen Charity Match at the Wembley Stadium in March 2025

On June 2, 2024, Cox played as a goalkeeper in a soccer charity match held by British YouTube group Beta Squad and American YouTube group AMP at Selhurst Park stadium in London, UK, as part of Team AMP. The event raised money for The Water Project. The match ended in a 6–6 draw after a pitch invasion forced the game to be called off.

On March 8, 2025, Cox played as a goalkeeper in the 2025 Sidemen Charity Match, organised by British YouTube group the Sidemen, representing YouTube Allstars. The event raised money for BBC Children in Need, Bright Side and M7 Education. The match was played at Wembley Stadium, London, United Kingdom, in front of a sellout crowd of 90,000. He went on to make a crucial save in the game's penalty shoot-out and was voted player of the match.

==== What's up, brother? ====
"What's up, brother?" was Cox's catchphrase, first seen during a FaceTime call with fellow Twitch streamer and friend, Nicholas Stewart, known as Jynxzi. Stewart called him during a stream, to which Cox replied by saying the line with his index finger pointing up.

Cox went viral on TikTok after a trend in which women say Cox's catchphrase, "What's up, brother?" to their boyfriends, along with pointing their index finger up to see if they recognized it. The men would either be confused, or respond in Cox's voice, "What's up, brother!" or wave their arms and say "Tuesday, Tuesday."

The trend has been adopted by lots of professional sports teams, such as the Dallas Mavericks, the Tennessee Titans, the Final Four teams in March Madness, and the NFL. Some professional sports players were seen doing Cox's celebration, such as Bryce Harper, Johan Rojas, Bo Naylor, Kyle Tucker, and many more.

Later in December 2024, Twitch named "What's up, brother?" the catchphrase of the year in the platform's 2024 recap.

== Personal life ==
Cox currently resides in Houston, Texas, and is a supporter of the Houston Texans.

=== OnlyFans leak ===
On July 7, 2024, a YouTuber named Pocketbook posted a 17-minute video titled "The Real Sketch: The Untold Story of Jamie Mar". In the video, Pocketbook claimed that before Cox's streaming career took off, he used to post OnlyFans content under the "Jamie Mar" username. The video soon went viral across social media, as the content that Cox participated in features gay pornography, sparking online criticism. On July 8, 2024, Cox went live on his Twitch channel and confirmed the rumors surrounding his former career path, stating he was going through a rough patch during that time in his life. Cox further explained that the videos were from two years ago, described himself as a "changed" person, and said he was dealing with addiction during that period of his life. Throughout the stream, Cox made multiple jokes in light of the situation, such as stating that he "did not have sexual relations with that man... I'm just kidding, I did, possibly", referencing a Bill Clinton quote during the Clinton–Lewinsky scandal. Multiple other social media personalities and athletes publicly expressed their support towards Cox afterwards.

== Filmography ==
Television
Year	Title	Role	Notes	Ref.
2025	Inside: USA	Himself (Contestant)	Series 1	

== Awards and nominations ==
Year	Ceremony	Category	Result	Ref.
2024	The Streamer Awards	Best Sports Streamer	Won	
2024	The Streamer Awards	Best Breakout Streamer	Nominated	
