= Marlon (streamer) =

Swedish-American streamer, actor, and model

- Born: Marlon Lundgren Garcia; Malmö, Sweden
- Other names: Marlon LuGa; marlon3lg
- Occupations: Internet personality; Streamer; Model

Instagram information
- Page: marlon3lg
- Followers: 5.7 million

TikTok information
- Page: marlon3lg
- Followers: 6.1 million

Twitch information
- Channel: Marlon
- Years active: 2024
- Genres: Just Chatting; IRL
- Followers: 2.8 million

X information
- Handle: @Mar3lg

YouTube information
- Channel: Marlon
- Years active: 2025–present
- Genres: Gaming; vlogs; IRL
- Subscribers: 1.4 million
- Views: 484 million
- Last updated: 14 August 2026

Marlon Lundgren Garcia, known mononymously as Marlon, is a Swedish internet personality, online streamer and model. He is known for his close friendships with former members of content-gaming organization FaZe, and is a current member of CORE Boys.

== Early life and education ==
Marlon Lundgren Garcia was born in Sweden. His mother is Spanish and Swedish, and his father is Nigerian and Swedish.

== Career ==
Marlon began streaming on Twitch in 2024. He is known for streaming IRL (in real life) content, as well as for frequently collaborating with FaZe Clan members. Prior to gaining wider recognition, Marlon went on a trip to Miami to stream, where he met streamers Lacy and Clix. As of November 2025, Marlon lives in Los Angeles, California, and said that his religious faith is important to him.

In July 2025, Marlon accidentally got Gorilla Glue in his eye while live streaming. Later that year, he visited Sioux Falls, South Dakota, where he met fans, streamed with local creators, and participated in events with other streamers in Boise, Idaho.

Marlon also had actress Natalie Portman's son Aleph on his livestream playing football, with Aleph calling Natalie Portman on FaceTime. The incident was covered in mainstream media, including airing on a Good Morning America segment.

He made a cameo appearance in a 2025 music video, "Type Dangerous" by Mariah Carey.

In 2026, Marlon was a cast member on series 3 of the Netflix reality series Inside, hosted by the Sidemen, and played in their 2026 Charity Match.

In March 2026, Marlon formed media collective CORE Boys with former FaZe members Stable Ronaldo, JasonTheWeen, Lacy, Adapt and Silky. Their house was swatted on the first day they streamed.

Marlon is also a model who has participated in Paris Fashion Week and London Fashion Week. Vanity Fair included him in a piece about "the state of American style" in August 2026.

== Filmography ==
Television
Year	Title	Role	Notes	Ref.
2026	Inside	Contestant	Series 3	

Music videos
Year	Title	Artist	Role	Ref.
2025	"Type Dangerous"	Mariah Carey	—N/a	

== Awards and nominations ==
Awards	Year	Category	Result	Ref.
The Streamer Awards	2025	Rising Star	Won	
The Streamer Awards	2025	Best Stream Duo (Note: Shared with Lacy.)	Nominated	
The Streamer Awards	2026	Best Stream Duo	Pending	
The Streamer Awards	2026	Best Breakout Streamer	Pending	
