= Praise Jah in the Moonlight =

Single by YG Marley
- Released: December 27, 2023
- Genre: Reggae
- Length: 4:23
- Label: YG Marley Music
- Songwriters: Joshua Marley; Lauryn Hill; Bob Marley
- Producers: YG Marley; Lauryn Hill; Johnny G

YG Marley singles chronology
"Praise Jah in the Moonlight" (2023)	"Survival" (2024)

"Praise Jah in the Moonlight" is a song by American singer YG Marley. Released independently as his debut single on December 27, 2023, it was written by Marley and his mother Lauryn Hill, both of whom also produced the song with Johnny G. The song also samples his grandfather Bob Marley and the Wailers' 1978 song "Crisis". The song charted internationally, reaching the top 20 on the Billboard Global 200 chart. The song also peaked at number one in New Zealand, and reached the top five on the UK Singles Chart.

On April 20, 2024, a music video for the song was released on the Lyrical Lemonade YouTube channel. The video was directed by Cole Bennett, and features a cameo from Hill.

== Promotion ==
In late 2023, Marley performed the song at several of his mother Lauryn Hill's concerts, which led to the song gaining popularity on TikTok and fans asking for an official release of the song, which occurred on December 27, 2023.

== Commercial performance ==
"Praise Jah in the Moonlight" garnered millions of official on-demand streams during its first few weeks of release. The song became a global hit, reaching the top twenty on the Billboard Global 200 chart. "Praise Jah in the Moonlight" eventually peaked at number one in New Zealand. The song also became a top five hit in the UK; and reached the top 40 in the Netherlands, Canada and Ireland. In the United States, it debuted at number 74 on the Billboard Hot 100 in the issue dated February 10, 2024; becoming the first reggae song to enter the chart since Marley's uncle Damian Marley and Jay-Z entered the chart with their single "Bam", seven years prior. YG Marley also became the sixth member of the Marley family to enter the Hot 100, while his mother also has entries on the chart.

The song reached number 39 on the Billboard Hot 100, in the issue dated March 2, 2024. That same week, the song peaked within the top ten on the TikTok Billboard Top 50 chart, after receiving a spike in popularity due to the release of the film Bob Marley: One Love. The song also received a boost in popularity after Kim Kardashian and Kanye West's daughter North used the song in a TikTok video, which accumulated over 30 million views. Internet celebrity Leah Halton posted a viral video lip syncing to the song on TikTok, which became one of the most popular videos on the platform; earning 650 million views, along with 45.1 million likes as of April 15th.

== Charts ==
=== Weekly charts ===
Weekly chart performance for "Praise Jah in the Moonlight"
Chart (2024)	Peak position
Australia (ARIA)	19
Austria (Ö3 Austria Top 40)	50
Belgium (Ultratop 50 Wallonia)	44
Brazil Hot 100 (Billboard)	27
Canada Hot 100 (Billboard)	20
Denmark (Tracklisten)	23
France (SNEP)	29
Germany (GfK)	46
Global 200 (Billboard)	11
Ireland (IRMA)	9
Israel (Mako Hitlist)	48
Lithuania (AGATA)	31
Luxembourg (Billboard)	8
Netherlands (Single Top 100)	8
Netherlands (Tipparade)	1
New Zealand (Recorded Music NZ)	1
Norway (VG-lista)	6
Panama (PRODUCE)	29
Portugal (AFP)	6
Sweden (Sverigetopplistan)	9
Switzerland (Schweizer Hitparade)	5
UK Singles (Official Charts)	5
UK Indie (Official Charts)	1
US Billboard Hot 100	34

=== Year-end charts ===
2024 year-end chart performance for "Praise Jah in the Moonlight"
Chart (2024)	Position
Canada (Canadian Hot 100)	87
Global 200 (Billboard)	200
New Zealand (Recorded Music NZ)	12
Portugal (AFP)	115
UK Singles (OCC)	79

== Certifications ==
Certifications for "Praise Jah in the Moonlight"
Region	Certification	Certified units/sales
Belgium (BRMA)	Gold	20,000^{‡}
Canada (Music Canada)	2× Platinum	160,000^{‡}
France (SNEP)	Platinum	200,000^{‡}
New Zealand (RMNZ)	2× Platinum	60,000^{‡}
United Kingdom (BPI)	Platinum	600,000^{‡}
United States (RIAA)	Platinum	1,000,000^{‡}
Streaming
Sweden (GLF)	Gold	6,000,000^{†}
^{‡} Sales+streaming figures based on certification alone.^{†} Streaming-only figures based on certification alone.
