= WillNE =

British internet personality

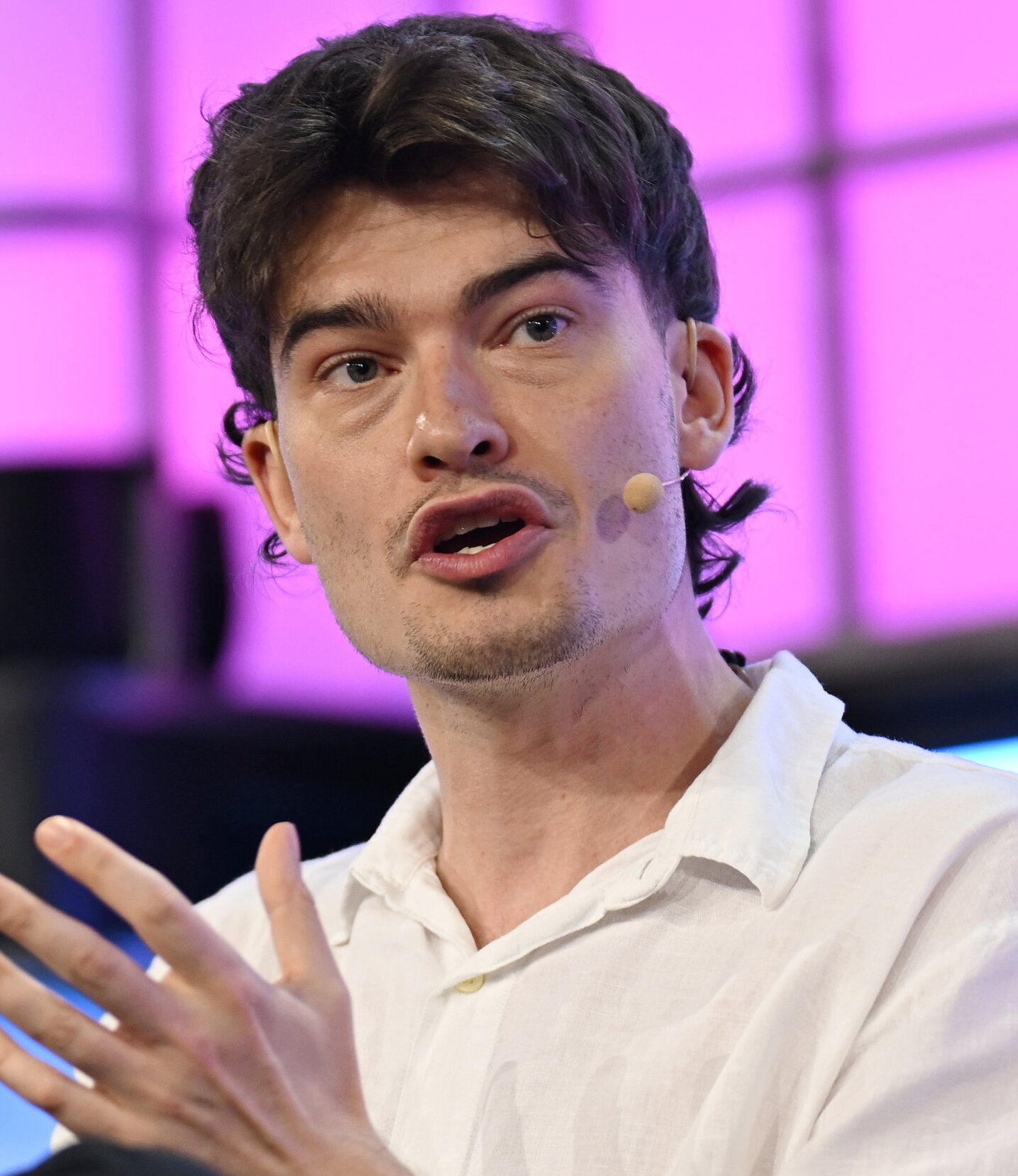
- Lenney at the Web Summit 2025
- Born: William Jonathan Lenney; 11 March 1996 (age 30); Newcastle-upon-Tyne, England
- Education: Loughborough University
- Occupation: YouTuber

YouTube information
- Channel: WillNE
- Years active: 2012–present
- Genres: Comedy; Commentary; Entertainment
- Subscribers: 5.32 million (main channel); 7.91 million (combined) (Note: Subscribers, broken down by channel: 5.32 million (WillNE) 2.54 million (More WillNE) 58.4 thousand (WillNE Shorts))
- Views: 937 million (main channel); 1.7 billion (combined) (Note: Views, broken down by channel: 937 million (WillNE) 763 million (More WillNE) 3.2 million (WillNE Shorts))
- Last updated: 17 June 2026

William Jonathan Lenney (born 11 March 1996), known online as WillNE, is a British YouTuber and internet personality. He is known for commentary and reaction videos focused on internet culture, varied entertainment content, and for co-founding the iced coffee company Rodd's alongside close friend and frequent collaborator James Marriott.

Lenney began uploading videos to YouTube in the early 2010s, beginning with gaming-related content before moving to commentary videos. His work grew in popularity through commentary and comedic analysis of online trends, before later pivoting into more varied entertainment content including travel and challenge videos.

== Early life ==
Lenney was born in Newcastle-upon-Tyne on 11 March 1996 and grew up in Monkseaton, Whitley Bay, England. At the age of 14, he began filming videos as a hobby.

He graduated from Whitley Bay High School, and began studying automotive engineering at Loughborough University.

== Career ==
Lenney uploaded his first video to YouTube in April 2012, at the age of 16. He continued filming videos when starting in Loughborough University in autumn 2015. He disliked his engineering coursework, and struggled through his first year at university. After finishing his homework for the night, he would often film YouTube videos for hours on end. By the end of his first year in university, Lenney had amassed 15,000 subscribers on the platform.

The summer after his first year, Lenney posted a video documenting Blackpool Grime Media, a grime music group for child rappers. His video on the poor skills of the child rappers went viral. His channel exploded, and he made several follow-up videos, each gaining more and more traction.

By the end of that summer, Lenney's channel had grown to over 250,000 subscribers, and he was being recognized in public. Seeing his success, his parents encouraged him to take time off of university. That September, Lenney dropped out of university to pursue content creation full-time.

Lenney's channel continued to grow in popularity as he continued to produce commentary videos and expanded into broader entertainment-style videos. In November 2018, Lenney attempted to fool various UK-based tabloid media companies into believing that he would be a contestant on I'm a Celebrity...Get Me Out of Here!. The campaign was partially successful, with several organisations, including OK! Magazine and Metro, printing stories on the rumours before the full cast of the series was revealed. In 2019, Lenney went on a This Week On The Internet Live tour with fellow YouTuber Stephen Tries. In February 2023, Lenney revived "This Week On The Internet" before shutting it down in August 2023. In April 2020, Lenney co-launched a joint channel named "Eboys" with ImAllexx, James Marriott, and Memeulous. The group disbanded in April 2021.

Lenney frequently participates in various football-related endeavors. Since 2017, Lenney has participated in Sidemen Charity Matches, hosted by the Sidemen. He plays for the Youtube Allstars and scored a goal in both the 2022 and 2026 matches. In December 2021, Lenney participated in a five-a-side football tournament hosted by Twitch and fellow YouTuber TrueGeordie that raised money for the Alan Shearer Foundation. The event raised more than £100,000.

As his channel matured, Lenney moved reaction content to his second channel, "More WillNE", and focused his main channel on more complex projects. In a November 2023 video, Lenney conducted a social experiment comparing honesty across ten UK cities to examine stereotypes surrounding the North–South divide in England. Using bank details displayed on billboards, unattended bicycles, and lost wallets, his experiment ranked Cardiff as the most honest city and Glasgow second while London appeared to be the least honest.

In January 2024, Lenney became a co-owner of Quadrant Esports, a content creation and apparel brand founded by Formula One racing driver Lando Norris.

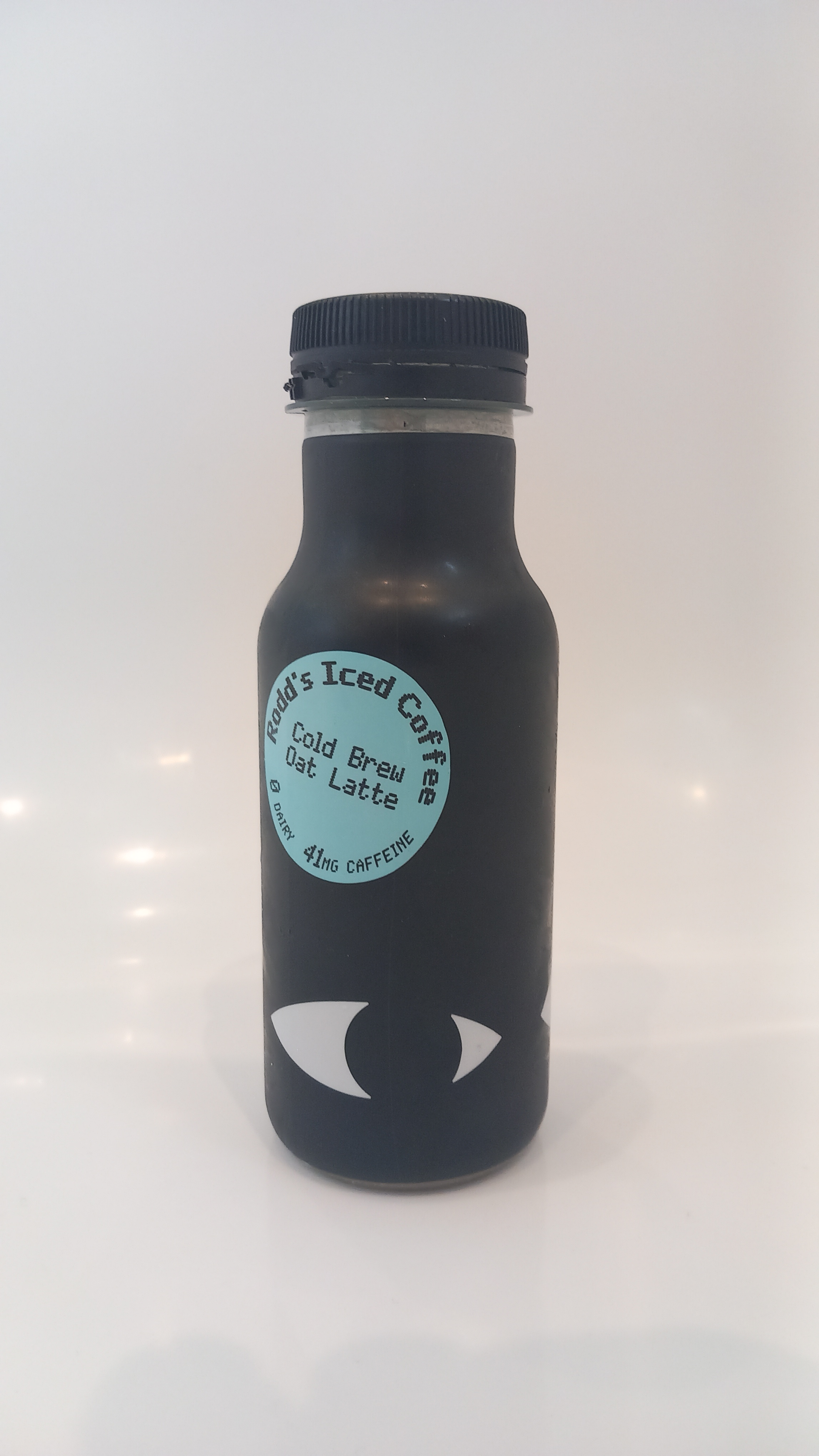
A Cold Brew Oat Latte bottle of Rodd's

In May 2025, Lenney co-founded iced coffee company Rodd's with close friend and frequent collaborator James Marriott. Advertised as "iced coffee in a bottle that tastes like iced coffee not in a bottle", the brand debuted exclusively in the United Kingdom at 300 Sainsbury's stores. In its first year, the brand surpassed £3 million in retail sales and launched six SKUs. Rodd's rapidly expanded from 300 Sainsbury's stores to nationwide Sainsbury supermarket distribution within six months, while also launching in Sainsbury's Meal Deals, convenience, and forecourts. Rodd's further expanded distribution through Ocado, WHSmith and food-to-go operator Sandwich Sandwich.

In a 2026 article with the Tea & Coffee Trade Journal, Lenney discussed next steps for the brand: "Now it's about scaling Rodd's properly. Heading into summer, we're backing it with serious investment – sampling and out-of-home activity – getting it in front of people in the real world so visibility keeps pace with the demand we're already seeing on the shelf."

== Personal life ==
Lenney has reflex anoxic seizures and has seizures at the sight or discussion of gore. He does not have seizures in places where he is comfortable but does in places where he cannot easily leave, such as movie theatres and classrooms. He had a seizure at Cody Ko's live show in early 2020.

Lenney currently lives in London.
