= Floyd Mayweather Jr. vs Deji =

Boxing competition

- Date: 13 November 2022
- Venue: Coca-Cola Arena, Dubai, UAE

Tale of the tape
Boxer	Floyd Mayweather Jr.	Deji Olatunji
Nickname	Money	The Tank
Hometown	Grand Rapids, Michigan, U.S.	London, England
Pre-fight record	50–0 (27 KOs)	1–0 (1 KO) (Note: On BoxRec, Olatunji's MF-professional record.)
Height	5 ft 8 in (1.73 m)	5 ft 7 1/2 in (1.71 m)
Weight	154 lb (70 kg)	175 lb (79 kg)
Style	Orthodox	Southpaw
Recognition	5-division world champion	

Result
- Mayweather Jr. wins via 6th-round TKO

Floyd Mayweather Jr. vs Deji was an exhibition boxing match contested between former five-division world champion Floyd Mayweather Jr. and YouTuber Deji Olatunji. The exhibition boxing bout took place on November 13, 2022 at Coca-Cola Arena in Dubai, UAE. Mayweather defeated Olatunji via 6th round TKO.

== Background ==
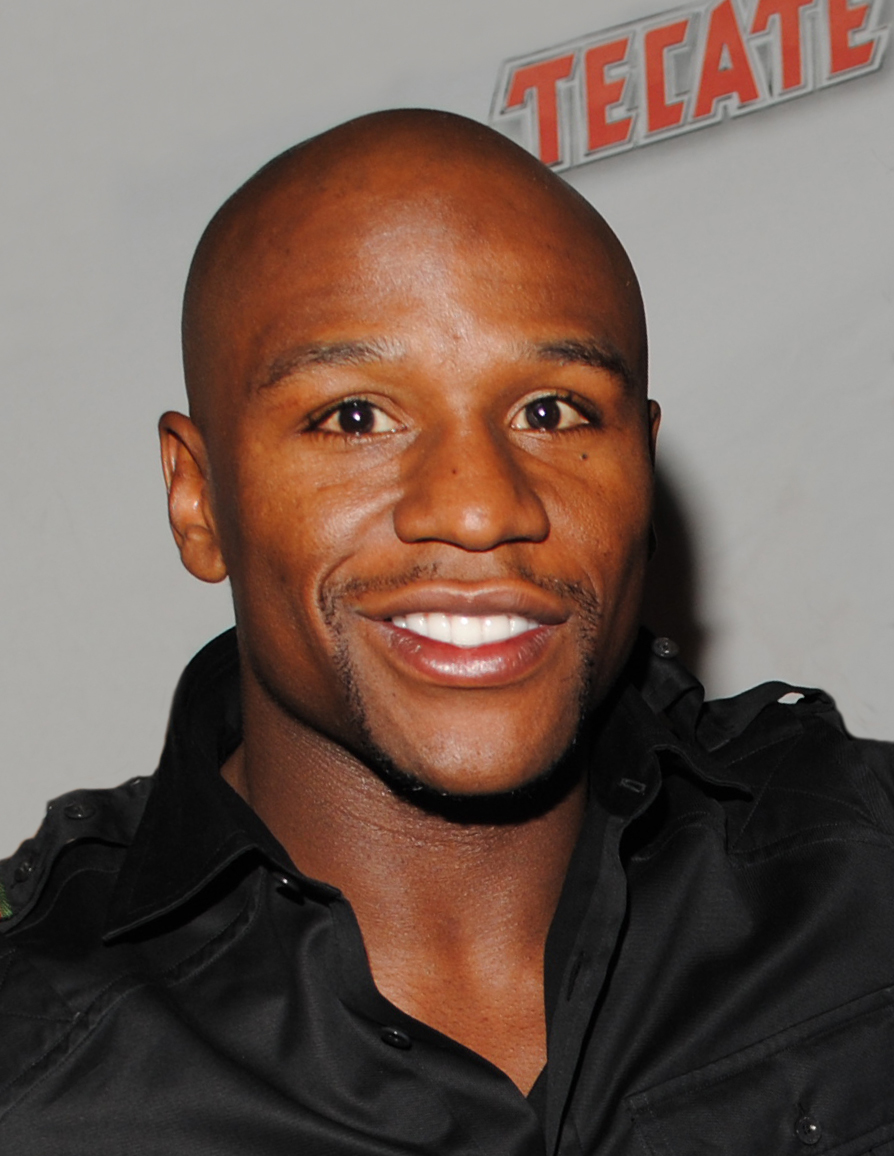
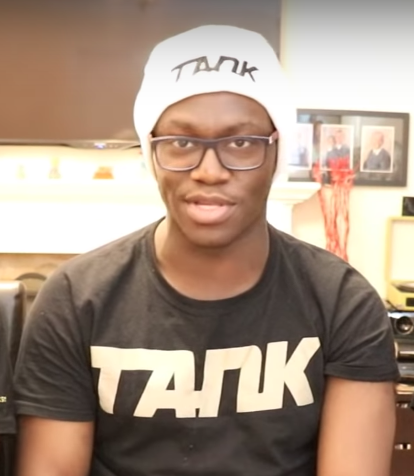
Floyd Mayweather Jr. (left) and Deji Olatunji (right).

On 15 September 2022 it was reported by Mirror Fighting that American five-division world champion Floyd Mayweather Jr. and Deji Olatunji, were in the final stages of negotiations for an exhibition bout in Dubai for the 13th of November. The report revealed that Jack Fincham, Harley Benn, Anthony Taylor, and Paul Daley were approached to feature on the undercard.

On 20 September, it was announced that Global Titans' next event is set for 13 November at the Coca-Cola Arena, Dubai, UAE. On 26 September, Mayweather Jr. and Olatunji were confirmed set to face in an exhibition bout on 13 November.

On 18 October, it was announced by DAZN and Misfits Boxing would co-promote and distribute the event alongside Global Titans, with the focus on English-speaking markets. The event was marketed and branded as part of their "X Series" events and broadcast on DAZN PPV.

=== Press conferences ===
Four press conferences were held in the following cities:

- 13 October – TMT Gym, Las Vegas, Nevada, U.S.
- 21 October – Handelsbeurs, Antwerpen, Belgium (Delfine Persoon vs Ikram Kerwat)
- 4 November – York Hall, London, England
- 10 November – Dubai Sports Council, Dubai, U.A.E.

== Fight card ==
Weight class		vs		Method	Round	Time	Notes
Main Card
Catchweight	Floyd Mayweather Jr.	def.	Deji Olatunji	TKO	6 (8)	1:22	Exhibition bout
Cruiserweight	Tommy Fury	vs.	Rolly Lambert	—N/a	6	—N/a	Exhibition bout
Junior welterweight	J’Hon Ingram	vs.	Kōji Tanaka	N/A	3	—N/a	Exhibition bout
Super featherweight	Jaider Herrera	def.	Franklin Manzanilla	TKO	5 (10)	3:00	For WBC International Super Featherweight Title
Catchweight	Jack Fincham	vs.	Anthony Taylor	N/A	4	—N/a	Exhibition bout, no winner was declared
Preliminary Card (Global Titans' YouTube channel)
Super featherweight	Delfine Persoon	vs.	Ikram Kerwat	NC	1 (10)	1:06	For WBC Silver Super Featherweight Title
Light-heavyweight	Bobby Fish	def.	Boateng Prempeh	KO	2 (4)	1:02	Fish's professional debut

== Broadcasting ==
Country/Region	Broadcasters				
Country/Region	Free	Cable TV	PPV	Stream	Metaverse
Middle East: Bahrain; Cyprus; Egypt; Iran; Iraq; Israel; Jordan; Kuwait; Lebanon; Oman; Palestine; Qatar; Saudi Arabia; Syria; United Arab Emirates; Yemen	YouTube (Preliminary Card)	—N/a	FITE TV	—N/a	MetaVerseBooks; FightTyme
United Kingdom	YouTube (Preliminary Card)	—N/a	DAZN PPV	—N/a	MetaVerseBooks; FightTyme
United States	YouTube (Preliminary Card)	—N/a	DAZN PPV	—N/a	MetaVerseBooks; FightTyme
Canada	YouTube (Preliminary Card)	Indemand; Direct TV; Dish TV; Shaw; Rogbers; Bell	DAZN PPV	—N/a	MetaVerseBooks; FightTyme
North America	YouTube (Preliminary Card)	Indemand; Direct TV; Dish TV; Shaw; Rogbers; Bell	DAZN PPV	—N/a	MetaVerseBooks; FightTyme
Ireland	YouTube (Preliminary Card)	—N/a	DAZN PPV	—N/a	MetaVerseBooks; FightTyme
Australia	YouTube (Preliminary Card)	—N/a	DAZN PPV	—N/a	MetaVerseBooks; FightTyme
New Zealand	YouTube (Preliminary Card)	—N/a	DAZN PPV	—N/a	MetaVerseBooks; FightTyme
Japan	YouTube (Preliminary Card)	ABEMA	DAZN PPV	RIZIN Stream Pass	MetaVerseBooks; FightTyme
Worldwide	YouTube (Preliminary Card)	—N/a	FITE TV	—N/a	MetaVerseBooks; FightTyme
