= Yung Filly =

British YouTuber and musician (born 1995)

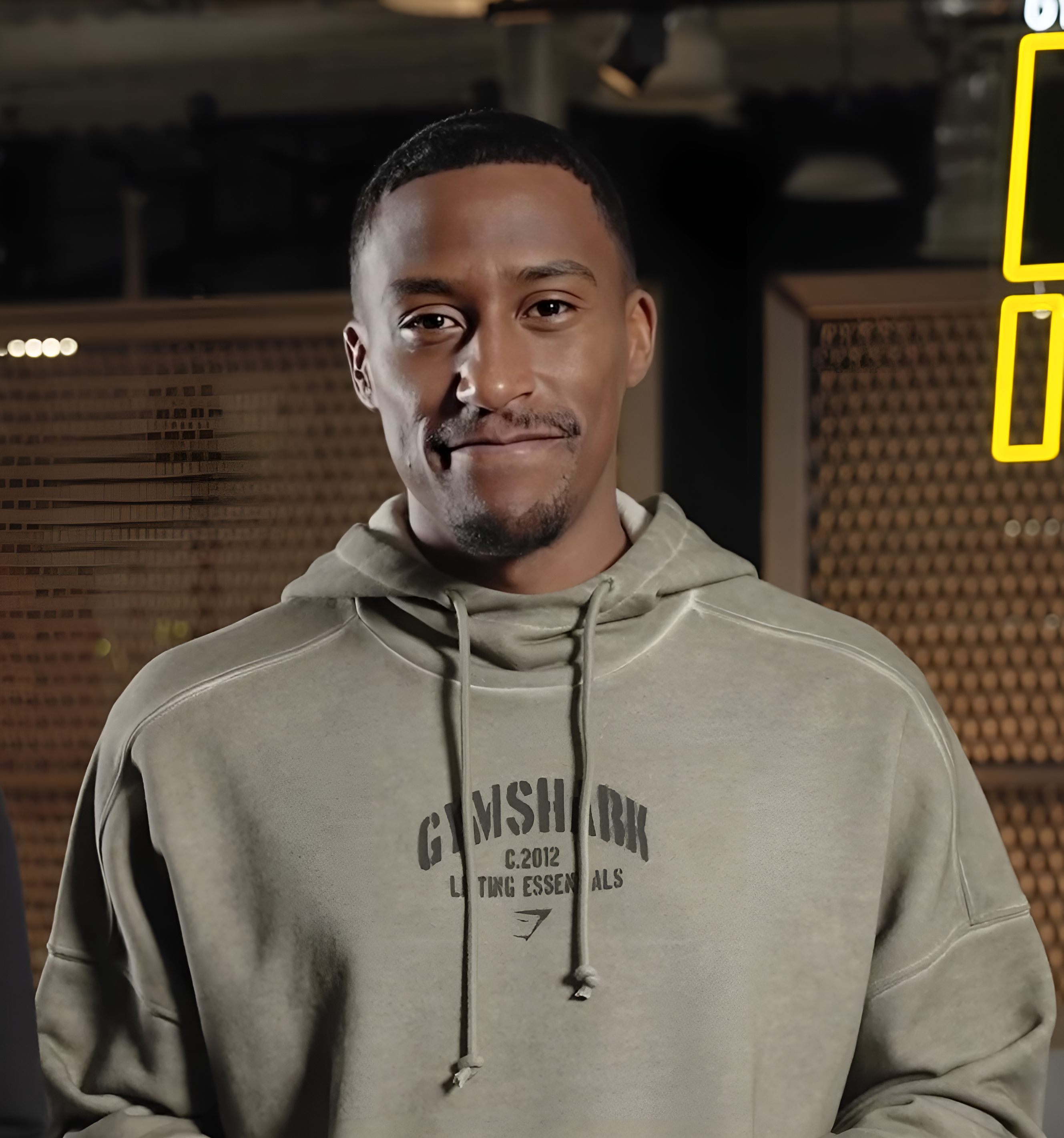
- Yung Filly in 2024
- Born: Andrés Felipe Valencia Barrientos; 6 August 1995 (age 31); Cali, Colombia
- Occupations: YouTuber; Internet personality; rapper

YouTube information
- Channel: Yung Filly
- Years active: 2013–present
- Subscribers: 1.79 million
- Views: 129 million
- Last updated: 25 February 2026

Andrés Felipe Valencia Barrientos (born 6 August 1995), known professionally as Yung Filly, is a British YouTuber and rapper. Born in Colombia and later moved to the United Kingdom, he began his YouTube career in 2013, starting a music career in 2017. Beginning in 2018, he appeared on numerous BBC shows, several of which he hosted.

== Early life ==
Andrés Felipe Valencia Barrientos was born in Cali, Colombia. At the age of two, he moved to London as a refugee with his mother and sister. The family moved around between Catford, Kidbrooke, Deptford, Ladywell and New Cross, before eventually settling in Orpington, Bromley. He attended Conisborough College. After completing Year 11, he briefly moved back to Colombia to play football for a team in Barranquilla, but later quit.

== Career ==
Valencia Barrientos began his YouTube career in 2013. His content comprised short skits and comedy Q&As. As well as building his own channel, Valencia Barrientos regularly appears on Footasylum's YouTube channel, starring in the dating series Does The Shoe Fit, as well as on Pro:Direct Soccer's YouTube channel. In 2018, he hosted Hot Property on BBC Three; the show was described by The Guardian as "so youthful...that it should come with a new kind of 18 certificate". In 2019, he hosted another show on BBC Three titled Don't Scream.

He appeared for England in Soccer Aid 2020; during the game, he scored a goal. He also appeared on the first episode of a football rivalry series alongside Chunkz, which was aired on BBC Sport. In 2021, He appeared on the first episode of Race Around Britain, hosted by Munya Chawawa. In 2022, it was announced that Valencia Barrientos and Chawawa would co-host a spin-off show of Freeze the Fear with Wim Hof, titled Munya and Filly Get Chilly. He also appeared on The Great Stand Up to Cancer Bake Off and BBC's Would I Lie To You?.

He and fellow content creator Harry Pinero partnered with German Doner Kebab and Heinz to develop a sauce called Secret Sauce, which was released in September 2024. In October 2024, he partnered with the FA and M&S Food for an online cooking series titled Freestyle Cooking, which was to feature footballers Bukayo Saka, Ezri Konsa, and Jarrod Bowen. However, the campaign was pulled one day after its release, following Valencia Barrientos's rape and assault charges on 10 October 2024.

Valencia Barrientos is a frequent collaborator with the Beta Squad, a YouTube collective also run by British content creators. He has also appeared in videos with the Sidemen. He is represented by UTA.

=== Music career ===
Valencia Barrientos cites his Colombian background and grime music as big influences on his music career. In 2017, he released his debut single, "Take Time". He would release two songs in 2018, "La Paila" and "Mucho Mas". He released "Confidence" in 2020, featuring Chunkz and Geko. He would release two other songs with Chunkz in 2020, "Clean Up" and "Hold", which peaked at number 67 and 29 on the UK Singles Chart, respectively. He also featured on Javan's "Again".

He released "100 Bags Freestyle" in 2021. He also announced a mixtape titled Last Laugh in an interview with GRM Daily. In 2022, he released a new single titled "Long Time" and later "Day to Day", featuring fellow British rapper and songwriter Chip. In 2024, he released two singles, "Grey" and "Tempted".

== Personal life ==
Valencia Barrientos is a supporter of Crystal Palace F.C.

== Legal issues ==
=== Sexual assault charges in Australia ===
On 8 October 2024, while on tour in Australia, Barrientos was arrested in Brisbane after allegedly sexually assaulting a woman in a Perth hotel room on 28 September. He was charged with four counts of sexual penetration without consent, three counts of assault occasioning bodily harm, and one count of impeding a person's normal breathing or circulation by applying pressure on or to their neck. He was extradited to Perth on 9 October 2024, and appeared at Perth Magistrates' Court for an initial hearing on 10 October 2024, where he was granted conditional bail. The bail terms mandated that he did not discuss the case on social media, or contact the alleged victim. Barrientos appeared in Perth Magistrates Court for a second time on 11 March 2025, and pled not guilty to all charges. On 13 June 2025, two new charges of sexual penetration without consent were filed against Barrientos. A trial started on 20 July 2026. His bail conditions were later amended to allow him to return home to the UK before the trial.

On 31 July 2026, Barrientos was acquitted of the more serious charges, but found guilty of two charges. The jury found him not guilty of three counts of sexual penetration without consent, they failed to reach a verdict on another three of the same charges. The charges Barrientos was found guilty for were charges of causing assault occasioning bodily harm, biting the woman's face and neck, and biting her breast hard enough that he left her with an open wound. On 21 August 2026, it was announced that Barrientos would be retried for three charges of sexual penetration without consent. He will be sentenced for his assault convictions after the retrial. The retrial is expected to start on 15 June 2027 and last eight days.

=== Sexual assault allegations in Spain ===
On 24 March 2025, it was reported that Barrientos was involved in an ongoing separate sexual assault case of a British tourist in Magaluf, Spain. The incident was reported to have happened in the previous summer.

=== Reckless driving in Australia ===
In December 2024, Valencia Barrientos was charged with reckless driving in Perth and had his vehicle impounded by police after he was caught driving 158 km/h (98 mph) in a 100 km/h (62 mph) zone the previous month. He was fined A$1,000 and given a six-month driving ban after pleading guilty.

== Discography ==
=== Singles ===
==== As lead artist ====
Title	Year	Peak chart positions							Certifications	Albums
Title	Year	UK	UK Ind.	IRE	NLD	NZ	SCO	SWE	Certifications	Albums
"Take Time"	2017	—	—	—	—	—	—	—		Non-album singles
"La Paila"	2018	—	—	—	—	—	—	—		Non-album singles
"Mucho Màs"	2018	—	—	—	—	—	—	—		Non-album singles
"Clean Up" (with Chunkz)	2019	67	—	—	—	—	—	—		Non-album singles
"Hold" (with Chunkz)	2019	29	3	—	—	— (Note: "Hold" did not enter the NZ Top 40 Singles Chart, but peaked at number 35 on the NZ Hot Singles Chart.)	31	—		Non-album singles
"Confidence" (with Chunkz and Geko)	2020	—	—	—	—	—	—	—		Non-album singles
"100 Bags Freestyle"	2021	53	—	—	—	—	—	—		Non-album singles
"Long Time"	2022	—	—	—	—	—	—	—		Non-album singles
"Day to Day" (with Chip)	2022	—	—	—	—	—	—	—		Non-album singles
"Grey" (solo or featuring Aitch)	2024	35	—	56	27	37	—	61	BPI: Silver	Non-album singles
"Tempted"	2024	—	—	—	—	— (Note: "Tempted" did not enter the NZ Top 40 Singles Chart, but peaked at number 12 on the NZ Hot Singles Chart.)	—	—		Non-album singles

==== As featured artist ====
Title	Year	Album
"Again" (Javàn featuring Yung Filly)	2020	Non-album single

== Filmography ==
Film
Year	Title	Role	Notes	Ref.
2023	Gassed Up	Himself		
2024	The Sidemen Story	Himself	Documentary; cameo	

Web roles
Year	Title	Role	Network(s)	Notes	Ref.
2018–2019	Unboxed: Footasylum	Himself	YouTube		
2018–2021	Truth Asylum	Himself	YouTube	Season 1–3	
2019–2021	Chefasylum	Himself	YouTube	Season 1–3; Season 6–7	
2019–2021	Does the Shoe Fit	Himself	YouTube	Season 1–5	
2020	Chicken Shop Date	Himself	YouTube	Episode 36 with Chunkz	
2023	Locked In	Himself	YouTube	Season 5	

Music videos
Year	Title	Artist(s)	Role	Ref.
2018	"Man Don't Dance"	Big Shaq	Groomsman	
2019	"Vibranium"	Chunkz feat. Neji	Himself	
2022	"Don't Lie"	A1 x J1 feat. Nemzzz	Himself	
2024	"Monkey"	IShowSpeed	Himself	
2024	"Get Down"	IShowSpeed	Himself	

== Awards and nominations ==
Ceremony	Year	Category	Recipient(s)	Result	Ref.
MOBO Awards	2021	Best Media Personality	Himself & Chunkz	Won	
MOBO Awards	2022	Best Media Personality	Himself	Nominated	
Rated Awards	2021	Personality of the Year	Himself	Nominated	
Rated Awards	2022	Personality of the Year	Himself	Nominated	
