= LazarBeam =

Australian YouTuber (born 1994)

- Born: Lannan Neville Eacott; 14 December 1994 (age 31); Central Coast, New South Wales, Australia
- Occupations: YouTuber; live streamer
- Spouse: Ilsa Watkins (m. 2026)

YouTube information
- Channel: LazarBeam
- Years active: 2015–present
- Genres: Gaming; comedy; vlog
- Subscribers: 28.9 million (combined)
- Views: 10.71 billion (combined)
- Last updated: 20 June 2026

Lannan Neville Eacott (born 14 December 1994), also known as his pseudonym LazarBeam, is an Australian YouTuber, gamer and Internet personality, known primarily for his video game commentary videos, "comedic riffs" and memes.

Eacott began making slow motion demolition videos in 2014 while working in his family's construction business. After having his equipment stolen, he registered his current YouTube channel in 2015. He uploaded his first video on the current channel on February 16 of the same year. Eacott primarily posted let's play and challenge videos of various video games. He also did many videos of him playing Madden through his channels' early years. As his channel grew, his style of video content diversified to include more vlog and comedy style videos. His channel experienced substantial growth in popularity when he began posting videos of Fortnite Battle Royale in 2018 and of Minecraft in 2019. In December 2019, Eacott was acknowledged as YouTube's eighth-most-viewed content creator of the year, with 2 billion views in 2019.

As of January 2026, his main YouTube channels have reached over 23.3 million subscribers and 10.09 billion video views, with his main channel ranking as the fourth-most-subscribed and eight-most-viewed channel on the platform from Australia.

== Early life ==
Lannan Neville Eacott was born on 14 December 1994, in Central Coast, New South Wales, Australia.

== Career ==
Eacott dropped out of high school at the age of 15 and started working in his family's construction business. He originally began posting videos of demolition in slow motion on YouTube, under the name "CrushSlash". After getting his recording equipment stolen, he registered the "LazarBeam" YouTube gaming channel on 4 January 2015, taking the name of one of his former RuneScape characters. Eacott focused on video game commentaries and challenge videos, primarily of the Madden NFL video game series. His channel experienced a substantial growth in popularity when he began playing Fortnite Battle Royale in 2018. On 18 September 2018, Eacott was announced as a member of the launch roster of the entertainment collective Click (also known as the Click Crew), alongside other Australian gaming personalities.

In April 2019, his channel reached 10 million subscribers, becoming the second Australian gaming content creator to hit that milestone. By July 2019, Eacott was the third-most-subscribed YouTube Fortnite streamer, with more than 10.8 million subscribers and over 7 billion video views. Eacott, along with some other streamers, was critical of the tenth season of Fortnite Battle Royale, which was released in August 2019 and introduced the "B.R.U.T.E"—a mechanical suit with missile launchers and a giant shotgun. The addition was described as "overpowered and unbalanced". Following this, Eacott's production of Minecraft-related videos began to increase, although he welcomed a Fortnite update that restricted the abilities of the mechanical suit. After the release of the game's second chapter in October 2019, the focus of Eacott's videos further shifted away from Fortnite; he stated that he was disappointed with the update's lack of content.

In December 2019, Eacott was acknowledged in YouTube's 2019 end-of-year summary, YouTube Rewind 2019: For the Record, as the eighth-most-viewed content creator of the year, with 2 billion views in 2019. Reporting on this, Business Insider described him as being known for his "comedic riffs" and use of memes. They also noted Eacott's video-editing style, which "uses zoom in and spliced graphics to highlight his reactions, with a camera focused directly on his face as he sits in front of a computer screen."

On 13 January 2020, it was announced that Eacott, along with fellow Australian YouTuber Elliott "Muselk" Watkins, had signed a deal with YouTube to stream exclusively on that platform; he had previously streamed on Twitch. Eacott and Watkins celebrated the announcement by undertaking in a 12-hour live stream to raise money for the ongoing Australian bushfire relief effort, and raised A$100,000. Similarly, early that month, Eacott, Watkins, and the other members of Click, did a 36-hour charity stream for the bushfire relief efforts and raised over A$300,000. Eacott has partnered with Rooster Teeth, and is represented by Click Management and WME.

In June 2020, during Fortnite's season-ending live event "The Device", Eacott's stream peaked at over 900,000 concurrent viewers. The following month, Click announced they would "stop filming [group] videos for the foreseeable future" with the members wanting to "spend time working on [their] own content". In December, Eacott was listed as the ninth top content creator of 2020 by YouTube, as well as the sixth-most-viewed gaming creator of the year and one of the top live streamers by views of 2020.

In March 2021, Eacott received his own Fortnite outfit in-game as part of the Fortnite Icon Series. In May 2022, Eacott reached 20 million subscribers on his YouTube channel. In June 2022, Eacott signed an ad sales deal with Studio71 in which the company would specifically pitch Eacott's YouTube videos to advertisers.

== Other ventures ==
In October 2019, it was announced that Eacott would appear as himself in the 2021 film Free Guy, alongside streamers Ninja and Jacksepticeye.

In 2022, Eacott and fellow YouTuber Fresh created World Boss, an arena shooter game, in collaboration with Australian developers PlaySide Studios. In March 2026, servers were shut down and the game was removed from Steam.

In July 2023, Eacott invested in notwoways, an East London sneaker brand owned by fellow YouTuber Callum "Callux" McGinley.

== Personal life ==
Eacott has two brothers and a sister. His sister, Tannar, has a YouTube channel with over 1 million subscribers. He attended Mackillop Catholic College. In early 2019, Eacott had his catchphrase "yeet" and "code lazar" (his unique identifier for Fortnite in-game purchases) tattooed on his left arm.

He is married to Ilsa Watkins. They announced their engagement on November 25, 2024. They married on March 20, 2026.

== Filmography ==
Film roles
Year	Title	Role	Notes	Ref.
2015	Lazer Team	—	Executive producer	
2021	Free Guy	Himself	Cameo	
2026	Street Fighter (2026 film)	Inmate	Cameo	

Television Roles
Year	Title	Role	Notes	Ref.
2024	Beast Games	Himself	S1E0 2,000 People Fight for $5,000,000	

== Awards and nominations ==
Award	Year	Category	Result	Ref.
Shorty Awards	2020	Best in Gaming	Nominated	
