= Christmas Drillings =

2022 Christmas song by the Sidemen

Single by the Sidemen featuring Jme
- Released: 4 December 2022
- Genre: Drill
- Length: 3:12
- Label: Self-released
- Songwriters: Olajide Olatunji; Tobi Brown; Vikram Barn; Jamie Adenuga; Nyandoro Kelly
- Producer: Nyge

Sidemen singles chronology
"This or That" (2022)	"Christmas Drillings" (2022)

Jme singles chronology
"Don't Know About You" (2021)	"Christmas Drillings" (2022)	"What You Know About That" (2024)

Music video
- "Christmas Drillings" on YouTube

"Christmas Drillings" is a song by the British YouTube group Sidemen featuring British rapper Jme. The song was written and performed by KSI, TBJZL, Vikkstar123, and Jme as part of a Sidemen Sunday video. The song was produced by Nyge.

== Background ==
The song is one of two singles released on 5 December as part of the weekly Sidemen Sunday videos in which two teams are selected to either be on the "good team" with a budget of $100,000 or the "bad team", which has a budget of $100. KSI, TBJZL, Vikkstar123 and Jme were selected for the good team while Miniminter, Behzinga, Zerkaa, W2S and Randolph were selected for the bad team. The good team wrote and recorded a Christmas tune titled "Christmas Drillings" with references to the roadman style of living during the festive season using a drill type beat produced by Nyge. The bad team wrote and recorded a Christmas tune titled "This or That" in which they make references to Santa Claus breaking and entering while delivering presents.

The group declared that the song with the most music video views and streams would be crowned the winner and all proceeds generated donated to FareShare.

== Track listing ==
Digital download
No.	Title	Length
1.	"Christmas Drillings"	3:12

Digital download – remix
No.	Title	Length
1.	"Christmas Drillings"	3:12
2.	"Christmas Drillings – House Mix" (featuring Jonny Fitch)	3:07
3.	"Christmas Drillings – EDM Mix" (featuring James Bluck)	3:18
4.	"Christmas Drillings – Choir Remix" (featuring Max Fosh)	1:13
5.	"Christmas Drillings – Sing Along Remix"	3:12
6.	"Christmas Drillings – Slowed Remix" (featuring Jonny Fitch)	3:43
7.	"Christmas Drillings – Sped-Up Remix" (featuring Jonny Fitch)	2:36

== Credits and personnel ==
Credits adapted from Tidal.

- Nyge – production, mixing, mastering
- KSI – songwriting, vocals
- TBJZL – songwriting, vocals
- Vikkstar123 – songwriting, vocals
- Jme – songwriting, vocals

== Charts ==
=== Weekly charts ===
Weekly chart performance for "Christmas Drillings"
Chart (2022)	Peak position
Hungary (Single Top 40)	2
Ireland (IRMA)	25
New Zealand Hot Singles (RMNZ)	7
UK Singles (Official Charts)	3
UK Indie (Official Charts)	2

=== Year-end charts ===
2022 year-end chart performance for "Christmas Drillings"
Chart (2022)	Position
Hungary (Single Top 40)	50

== Release history ==
Release dates and formats for "Christmas Drillings"
Region	Date	Format(s)	Version	Label(s)	Ref.
Various	4 December 2022	Digital download; streaming	Original	Self-released	
Various	15 December 2022	Digital download; streaming	Edm Mix	Self-released	
Various	15 December 2022	Digital download; streaming	House Mix	Self-released	
Various	15 December 2022	Digital download; streaming	Slowed Remix	Self-released	
Various	15 December 2022	Digital download; streaming	Sped-up Remix	Self-released	
Various	19 December 2022	Digital download; streaming	Choir Remix	Self-released	
Various	19 December 2022	Digital download; streaming	Sing Along Remix	Self-released	
