= TBJZL =

English YouTuber (born 1993)

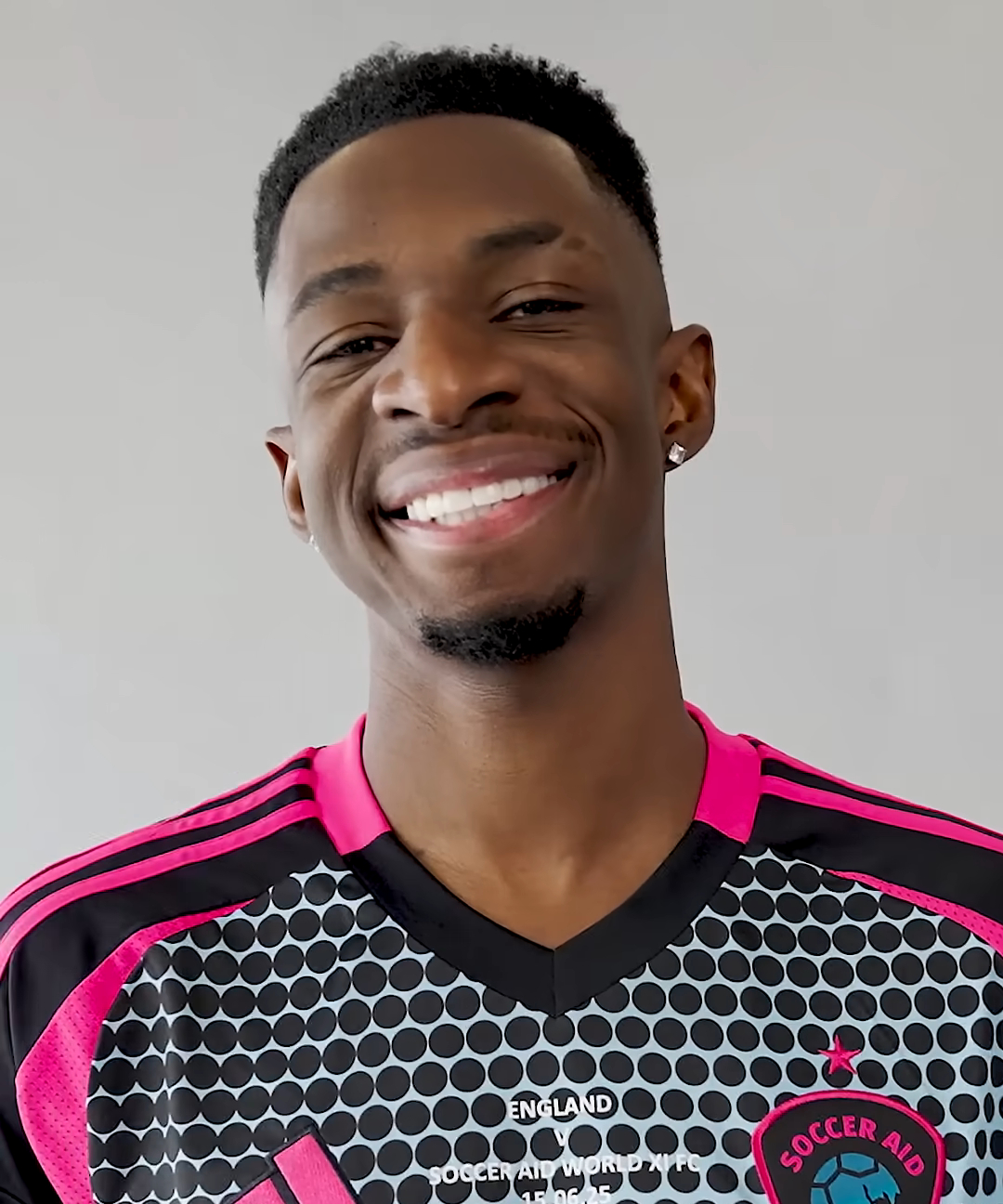
- Brown during a Soccer Aid promotional shoot in 2025
- Born: Tobit John Brown; 8 April 1993 (age 33); Hackney, London, England
- Other names: Tobjizzle; Tobi Lerone
- Education: Bexley Grammar School; Coventry University (BSc)
- Occupations: YouTuber; live streamer; rapper; influencer; Businessman

YouTube information
- Channel: TBJZL
- Years active: 2011–present
- Genres: Gaming; association football; vlog; music; food
- Subscribers: 7.2 million (combined)
- Views: 901 million (combined)
- Last updated: 15 August 2026

Tobit John "Tobi" Brown (born 8 April 1993), known professionally as TBJZL (/ˈtoʊb.ˈjɪ.zəl/ TOHB-JIH-zəl, "Tobjizzle"), (Note: Brown was also previously known by the alias Tobi Lerone, a play on the chocolate brand, Toblerone.) is an English YouTuber, streamer, and influencer. He is a member and co-founder of the British YouTube group the Sidemen. He is the co-owner of XIX Vodka, Sidemen Clothing, restaurant chain Sides, and cereal brand Best Breakfasts.

In 2019, Brown was listed as the 38th most influential online creator in the United Kingdom by The Sunday Times. As of January 2025, his main YouTube channel had over 5.14 million subscribers and 567 million video views. Brown has also released music mononymously, and in 2020, he released his debut single "Destined for Greatness", which peaked at number 30 on the UK Singles Chart and number 33 on the Irish Singles Chart.

== Early life ==
Tobit John Brown was born on 8 April 1993 in Hackney, London, to a working-class family of Nigerian heritage. He attended St. Dominic's Catholic Primary School from 1997 until 2004, and then attended Bexley Grammar School, where he met future fellow Sidemen member Josh Bradley. Brown later completed an honours degree in computing at Coventry University.

== YouTube career ==
Brown joined YouTube in 2011 while at university after he saw Bradley gaining traction on the platform, and then decided to become a full-time YouTuber after university. He uploads video game commentaries, most notably of the FIFA and NBA 2K video game series, as well as football challenges, vlogs, and comedy-style videos.

On 19 October 2013, Brown and four other British YouTubers formed the entertainment collective Ultimate Sidemen, later shortened to simply Sidemen. Since 2014, the group has consisted of seven British YouTubers: Vikram Barn (Vikkstar123), Josh Bradley (Zerkaa), Harry Lewis (W2S), Simon Minter (Miniminter), Ethan Payne (Behzinga), Tobi Brown (TBJZL) and formerly JJ Olatunji (KSI). The group produces online videos, consisting of challenges, sketches, and video-game commentary, as well as selling exclusive Sidemen merchandise.

In September 2019, Brown was listed as the 38th most influential online creator in the United Kingdom by The Sunday Times.

== Music career ==
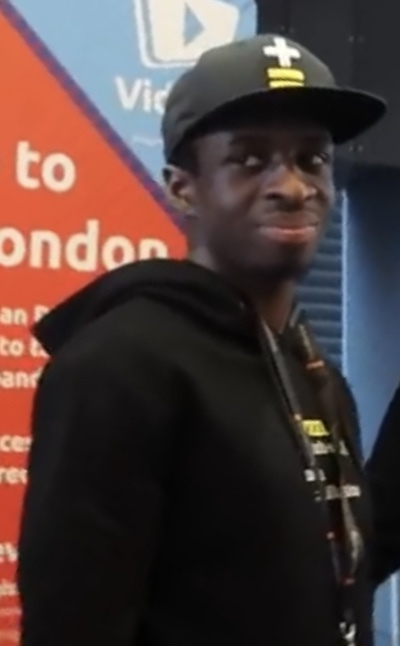
Brown in 2019 at Vidcon London

In December 2019, Brown released "The Gift" with the rest of the Sidemen, reaching number 77 on the UK Singles Chart.

On 7 February 2020, Brown released his debut single, "Destined for Greatness", with his brother Manny and featuring his sister Janellé. The song charted at number 31 on the UK Singles Chart, making it Brown's first UK top 40 single. Elsewhere, "Destined for Greatness" debuted at number 18 in New Zealand and on the Scottish Singles Chart, and peaked at number 33 on the Irish Singles Chart. He later featured in a remix of his fellow Sidemen member KSI's song "Wake Up Call" by producer Yoshi with American rapper Trippie Redd and British rapper P Money, which was released on 6 March 2020.

Brown was featured on "This Year" by P Money and producer Silencer, which was released on 19 March 2021. Brown released his second single, "Rhythm & Vibes", also with his brother Manny, on 20 August 2021.

In March 2022, he featured in rapper DTG's song "Just Do It". On 19 August 2022, he released "Keeper", alongside his brother Manny. On 5 December 2022, Brown, KSI, and Vikkstar123 released a Christmas-themed single titled "Christmas Drillings" under the Sidemen banner featuring British rapper Jme, which charted at number 3 in the UK.

On 7 September 2023, Brown uploaded a video to his YouTube channel titled "Making a Song in 24 Hours!!! (ft. Not3s)", in which Brown and British singer-songwriter Not3s created a song in 24 hours. The song "I Wanna" was released on streaming platforms a day later on 8 September 2023. On 5 May 2024, Brown uploaded another video making a song in 24 hours, this time with Australian rapper and singer Day1. The original song they created in the video featured a sample used by Kyle Richh, meaning the song could not be cleared. Brown and Day1 made another song in the video with Australian singer Blessed. The song, "Where We Go" with Day1 and Blessed, was released on streaming platforms three days prior to the video on 2 May 2024.

During his Twitch Subathon in April 2026, Brown created a song with Not3s and Big Shaq (a character created by British comedian Michael Dapaah) on stream. The stream segment of the trio making the song was uploaded to Brown's clips channel on 4 April 2026. The song "Villain" would not officially release on streaming platforms until 9 June 2026.

== Other ventures ==
=== Sidemen businesses ===
Brown and the Sidemen have founded multiple businesses throughout their online careers. In 2014, the group launched a clothing brand under the Sidemen Clothing banner. In November 2021, they founded a restaurant chain, known as Sides, in collaboration with Reef. In October 2022, they launched their own vodka brand known as XIX Vodka. In March 2024, they launched a breakfast cereal brand, known as Best Cereal, in collaboration with Mornflake.

=== ILLVZN ===
In June 2018, Brown founded a streetwear brand named ILLVZN, with the official launch in February 2019.

=== Baller League UK ===
In November 2024, it was announced that Brown would manage one of the 12 teams in the upcoming Baller League UK, a six-a-side football competition set to be broadcast on Sky Sports. In March 2025, it was revealed that Brown would manage a team named VZN FC. The team played its first match on 24 March 2025, losing 6–3 against Deportrio.

=== Family Ties podcast ===
In May 2025, Brown announced Family Ties, a podcast produced by The Fellas Studios. He hosts the podcast with his two brothers, Manny and Jedidiah.

== Personal life ==
Brown is a supporter of Manchester United F.C. and plays Sunday league football for Under The Radar FC, a team formed by his brother and fellow YouTuber Manny Brown. In 2019, he discussed the issue of racism in football in an interview with Sky Sports News.

He is Christian.

== Charity ==
On 14 February 2025, Brown participated in "Match for Hope 2025", a football charity event hosted in Doha, Qatar, as a player for Team Chunkz & IShowSpeed, facing off against Team AboFlah & KSI. The match ended with Team AboFlah & KSI's 6-5 victory over Team Chunkz & IShowSpeed. The event raised more than $10.7 million for charity.

== Filmography ==
Film
Year	Title	Role	Notes	Ref.
2022	Talk to Me	Himself	Uncredited; archival footage	
2023	KSI: In Real Life	Himself	Documentary	
2023	The Naughty List	Fros T	Short film	
2024	The Sidemen Story	Himself	Documentary	

Web roles
Year	Title	Role	Network	Notes	Ref.
2014	The Sidemen Experience	Himself	Comedy Central UK	Main role; 5 episodes	
2017	YouTube Rewind	Himself	YouTube	Episode: "The Shape of 2017"	
2018	The Sidemen Show	Himself	YouTube Premium	Main role; 7 episodes	
2020	Live Show From Lausanne 2020	Himself	Olympic Channel	Guest; 1 episode	
2020	How To Be Behzinga	Himself	YouTube	Guest; 3 episodes	
2024	The Chase: Sidemen Edition	Himself	YouTube	Special spin-off episode	

Television roles
Year	Title	Role	Network	Notes	Ref.
2019	Tackling Racism	Himself	Sky Sports News	Episode: Grassroots	
2024–present	Inside	Host	YouTube, Side+, (Note: Series 1 was shown on the Sidemen and Moresidemen YouTube channels with extras and unseen moments being shown on Side+. Series 2 onwards will be exclusively on Netflix with companion shows being shown on Side+.) Netflix	Reality show created by the Sidemen	
2025–present	Inside USA	Host	Netflix	American reality show created by the Sidemen	
2025–present	Baller League UK	Himself	Sky Sports Mix	Six-a-side football league	
2026	SideMenu	Contestant	YouTube, Amazon Prime Video	Cooking show created by the Sidemen	
2026-present	Outside	Host	Netflix	Spin-off series of Inside, created by the Sidemen	

Music videos
Year	Title	Artist(s)	Role	Ref.
2015	"Lamborghini"	KSI feat. P Money	Himself	
2015	"Man Don't Care"	Jme feat. Giggs	Himself	
2015	"Test Me"	Jme	Himself	
2019	"Real Name"	KSI, Randolph, Talia Mar	Pastor / EMT	
2022	"Don't Lie"	A1 x J1 feat. Nemzzz	Himself	
2025	"365"	Talia Mar	Himself	
2025	"Crush"	AJ Tracey feat. Jorja Smith	Himself	
2025	"Chemical"	Vikkstar, Adalaide Adams	Himself	

=== As director ===
==== Music videos ====
Year	Title	Release date	Artist(s)
2025	"Chemical"	5 May 2025	Vikkstar, Adalaide Adams

== Discography ==
=== Singles ===
==== As lead artist ====
List of lead singles with selected chart positions and year released
Title	Year	Peak chart positions						Album
Title	Year	UK	UK R&B	UK Ind.	IRE	NZ Hot	SCO	Album
"Destined for Greatness" (with Manny featuring Janellé)	2020	31	12	3	33	18	18	Non-album singles
"Rhythm & Vibes" (with Manny)	2021	47	16	6	59	—	—	Non-album singles
"Just Do It" (with DTG)	2022	—	—	—	—	—	—	Non-album singles
"Keeper" (with Manny)	2022	—	—	—	—	—	—	Non-album singles
"I Wanna" (with Not3s)	2023	—	—	—	—	—	—	Non-album singles
"Where We Go" (with Day1 and BLESSED)	2024	—	—	—	—	—	—	Non-album singles
"Villain" (with Not3s and Big Shaq)	2026	—	—	—	—	—	—	Non-album singles
Awards and nominationsg that did not chart othat territory.

==== As a featured artist ====
List of featured singles with selected chart positions and year released
Title	Year	Peak chart positions					Album
Title	Year	UK	UK R&B	UK Ind.	NZ Hot	SCO	Album
"Wake Up Call (Yoshi Remix)" (KSI featuring Trippie Redd, Tobi and P Money)	2020	—	—	—	—	—	Non-album remix
"This Year" (P Money and Silencer featuring Tobi)	2021	—	—	—	—	—	Untraditional
"—" denotes a recording that did not chart or was not released in that territory.

=== Guest appearances ===
List of non-single guest appearances, with other performing artists
Title	Year	Other artist(s)	Album
"The Gift"	2019	Sidemen, S-X	Non-album single

=== Other charted songs ===
List of other charted songs, with selected chart positions and album name
Title	Year	Peak chart positions						Album
Title	Year	UK	UK R&B	UK Ind.	NZ Hot	SCO	IRE	Album
"The Gift" (as part of Sidemen featuring S-X)	2019	77	40	11	27	26	—	Non-album singles
"Christmas Drillings" (as part of Sidemen featuring Jme)	2022	3	—	4	7	—	25	Non-album singles
"—" denotes a recording that did not chart or was not released in that territory.

=== Music videos ===
List of music videos as lead and featured artist, showing directors
Title	Year	Director(s)	Ref.
As lead artist
"Destined For Greatness" (with Manny featuring Janellé)	2020	Konstantin	
"Rhythm & Vibes" (with Manny)	2021	Konstantin	
"Just Do It" (with DTG)	2022	Paul Akins	
"Keeper" (with Manny)	2022	Lux London	
As featured artist
"The Gift" (as part of Sidemen featuring S-X)	2019	Konstantin	
"This Year" (P Money and Silencer featuring Tobi)	2021	Chas Appeti	
"Christmas Drillings" (as part of Sidemen featuring Jme)	2022	Konstantin	

== Bibliography ==
Year	Title	Publisher	ISBN identifier	Ref.
2016	Sidemen: The Book	Coronet Books	ISBN 978-1473648166	

== Awards and nominations ==
Year	Award	Category	Recipient(s)	Result	Ref.
2017	British Book Awards	Non-Fiction: Lifestyle Book of the Year	"Sidemen: The Book" (shared with the Sidemen)	Nominated	
2019	Shorty Awards	Best YouTube Ensemble	Himself (shared with the Sidemen)	Nominated	

=== World Records ===
Publication	Year	World record	Record holder	R. Status	Ref.
Guinness World Records	2022	Most viewers for a charity sports match live stream on YouTube	As member of the Sidemen	Record	

=== Listicles ===
Publisher	Year	Listicle	Result	Ref.
The Sunday Times	2019	UK’s Top 100 Influencer	38th	
