= Zerkaa =

British YouTuber (born 1992)

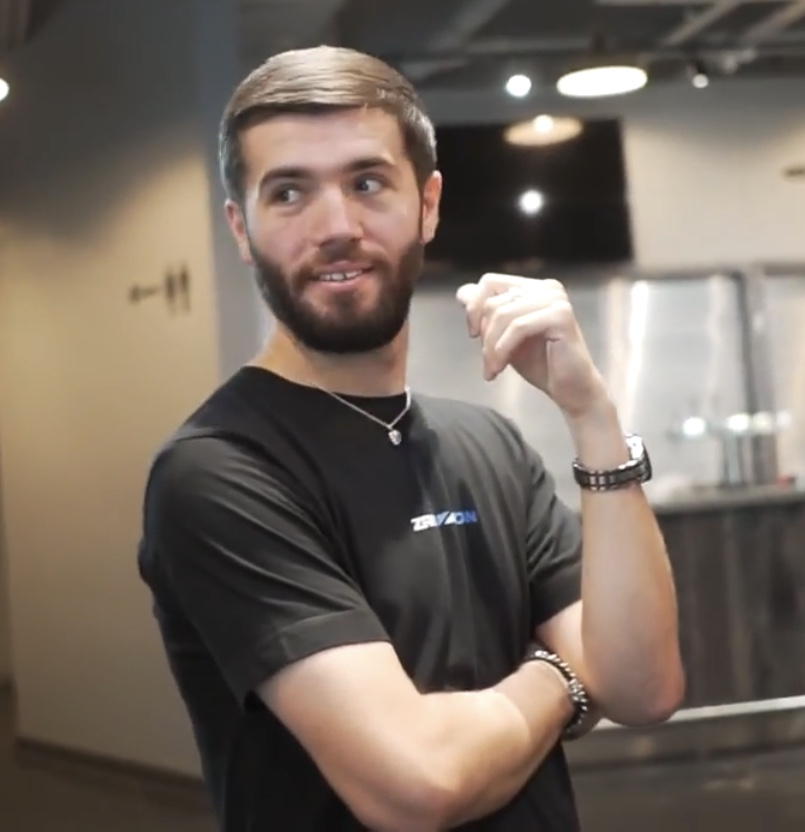
- Bradley in 2018
- Born: September 4, 1992 (age 34); London, England
- Other names: Josh Zerker; Tommy T
- Education: Ravensbourne University
- Occupations: YouTuber; Twitch streamer
- Spouse: Freya Nightingale (m. 2025)

Twitch information
- Channel: Zerkaa
- Years active: 2010–present
- Genre: Gaming
- Games: FIFA; Grand Theft Auto V
- Followers: 1.5 million

YouTube information
- Channel: Zerkaa
- Years active: 2009–present
- Genres: Gaming; vlog; reaction
- Subscribers: 8.6 million (combined)
- Views: 2.3 billion (combined)
- Last updated: 16 July 2026

Joshua Charlie Joseph Bradley (born 4 September 1992), better known by his online alias Zerkaa, is an English YouTuber, Twitch streamer, influencer, and Internet personality. He is a member of the British YouTube group, the Sidemen. In 2019, he was listed as the ninth most influential online creator in the United Kingdom by The Sunday Times. In 2022, he was the most watched Twitch streamer in the United Kingdom, with 17.68 million hours watched.

== Early life and education ==
Joshua Bradley was born on 4 September 1992 in Bermondsey, London. He attended Bexley Grammar School in Welling, where he met future fellow Sidemen member Tobi Brown. He claims to have had an interest in architecture in his early years, and used to love designing houses. As a child, Bradley took dance lessons and competed in street dance performances. His parents went through a divorce growing up, which he states led to him playing games. He claims to have played Call of Duty in his room for 8 hours, because he wanted an escape from the stress of his parents' divorce. In the Netflix documentary, The Sidemen Story, Bradley had mentioned that he suffered from anxiety.

He later attended Ravensbourne University and earned an upper second honours degree in digital film production. Before getting into content creation, Bradley tried working in a bank in London with his father, who was a banker himself, but left soon after. He also had a week-long stint at the Sky Sports studio.

== Career ==
In 2009, Bradley created his first YouTube channel, Zerkaa, to which he primarily uploaded video game content from games like Call of Duty and FIFA. He has subsequently launched six more solo YouTube channels — namely ZerkaaPlays, ZerkaaReacts, ZerkaaLive, ZerkaaActuallyPlays, ZerkaaGuesses, and ZerkaaCards.

=== Sidemen ===
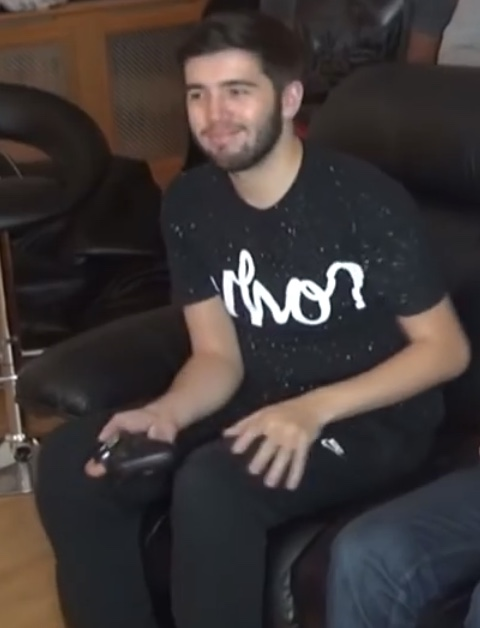
Zerkaa in 2014

In October 2013, Bradley co-founded and became a member of the British YouTuber group, the Sidemen. He is the eldest amongst the seven members of the Sidemen. He lived with three other members of the group — Vikkstar, KSI, and Miniminter — from 2014 until 2018, creating content regularly, after which he moved into an apartment with his girlfriend. The Sidemen publishes content around a variety of themes including challenges, sketches and video game commentaries.

In 2018, Bradley co-starred alongside the rest of the Sidemen in the YouTube Premium series The Sidemen Show. In 2019, Bradley was listed as the ninth most influential online creator in the United Kingdom by The Sunday Times. In a 2021 article discussing gambling issues surrounding the FIFA game series, Bradley was cited by The Sunday Times as an example of a YouTuber sponsored by EA to make pack-opening videos.

=== Twitch streaming ===
Bradley started streaming on Twitch in 2010. He is also a Twitch partner. In 2022, he was the most watched Twitch streamer in the United Kingdom, with 17.68 million hours watched. He was also cited as a streamer featuring walkthroughs of the 2023 video game Hogwarts Legacy by Guinness World Records. He was nominated for Best Role-play Streamer at the 2022 Streamer Awards.

== Other ventures ==
=== Sidemen ventures ===
Bradley and the Sidemen have founded multiple businesses throughout their online careers. In 2014, the group launched a clothing brand under the Sidemen Clothing banner. In November 2021, they founded a restaurant chain Sides in collaboration with Reef. In October 2022, they launched their own vodka brand, XIX Vodka. In March 2024, they launched a breakfast cereal brand, Best Cereal, in collaboration with Mornflake. In May 2025, they launched their own venture capital firm, Upside VC. Bradley was a Director of the firm but has formally resigned from the position.

=== Businesses ===
In 2017, Bradley launched his own clothing line, ZRK London, selling streetwear apparels, including T-shirts, hoodies, and caps. In 2023, the clothing line was renamed to Internet Made.

== Personal life ==
Bradley has been in a relationship with Freya Nightingale since 2010. They were engaged on 15 January 2024, and got married on 6 September 2025 in France. On 7 June 2026, Bradley announced via Instagram that they were expecting their first child.

Bradley is a supporter of Millwall F.C. and claims to have a season ticket since he was six years old. In a Sidemen video released in October 2021, Bradley revealed he had coprastasophobia, the fear of constipation.

== Filmography ==
Film
| Year | Title | Role | Network | Notes | Ref. |
|---|---|---|---|---|---|
| 2018 | KSI: Can't Lose | Himself | YouTube | Documentary | |
| 2023 | KSI: In Real Life | Himself | Amazon Prime Video | Documentary | |
| 2023 | The Spy Who Loved Eggnog | Timmy / Undercover Agent / Adolf's Father / Himself | YouTube | Short film | |
| 2024 | The Sidemen Story | Himself | Netflix | Documentary | |

Web roles
| Year | Title | Role | Network | Notes | Ref. |
|---|---|---|---|---|---|
| 2014 | The Sidemen Experience | Himself | Comedy Central | Main role; 5 episodes | |
| 2017 | YouTube Rewind | Himself | YouTube | Episode: "The Shape of 2017" | |
| 2018 | The Sidemen Show | Himself | YouTube Premium | Main role; 7 episodes | |
| 2018 | Formula E Voltage | Himself | YouTube | Guest; Episode "2018 Ad Diriyah ePrix" | |
| 2020 | How To Be Behzinga | Himself | YouTube | Guest; 3 episodes | |
| 2024 | The Chase: Sidemen Edition | Himself | YouTube | Special spin-off episode | |

Television roles
| Year | Title | Role | Network | Notes | Ref. |
|---|---|---|---|---|---|
| 2024–present | Inside | Host | YouTube, Side+, (Note: Series 1 was shown on the Sidemen and Moresidemen YouTube channels with extras and unseen moments being shown on Side+. Series 2 onwards will be exclusively on Netflix with companion shows being shown on Side+) Netflix | Reality show created by the Sidemen | |
| 2025–present | Inside USA | Host | Netflix | American reality show created by the Sidemen | |
| 2026 | SideMenu | Contestant | YouTube, Amazon Prime Video | Cooking show created by the Sidemen | |
| 2026-present | Outside | Host | Netflix | Spin-off series of Inside, created by the Sidemen | |

Music videos
| Year | Title | Artist(s) | Role | Ref. |
|---|---|---|---|---|
| 2022 | "Don't Lie" | A1 x J1 feat. Nemzzz | Himself | |
| 2025 | "365" | Talia Mar | Himself | |
| 2025 | "Chemical" | Vikkstar, Adalaide Adams | Himself | |

== Discography ==
=== Singles ===
==== As Lead Artist ====
List of singles as a lead artist, with selected chart positions, showing year released and album name
| Title | Year | Peak chart positions | Album |
| Title | Year | UK | Album |
|---|---|---|---|
| "Told You" (as Tommy T with Big Toe) (Note: Credited as Tommy T. Song created for GTA RP, but available on steaming platforms) | 2022 | — | Non-album single |
| "Here To Stay" (as Tommy T with SparkyKNE) | 2022 | — | Non-album single |

=== Charted songs ===
List of charted songs, with selected chart positions and album name
| Title | Year | Peak chart positions | | | | | | Album |
| Title | Year | UK | UK R&B | UK Ind. | NZ Hot | SCO | IRE | Album |
|---|---|---|---|---|---|---|---|---|
| "The Gift" (as part of Sidemen featuring S-X) | 2019 | 77 | 40 | 11 | 27 | 26 | — | Non-album singles |
| "This or That" (as part of Sidemen) | 2023 | — | — | 23 | 14 | — | — | Non-album singles |
"—" denotes a recording that did not chart or was not released in that territory.

=== Guest appearances ===
List of non-single guest appearances, with other performing artists
| Title | Year | Other artist(s) | Album |
|---|---|---|---|
| "The Gift" (Note: As part of Sidemen) | 2019 | Sidemen, S-X | Non-album single |
| "Tommy T" | 2021 | Wiked | Golden Boy |
| "This or That" | 2023 | Sidemen | Non-album single |
| "How Many Times" | 2024 | Eli Porter, Wiked, SparkKNE | The Vault |
| "Jump Out Gang - Remix" | 2024 | Eli Porter, Pixel Money | The Vault |

=== Music videos ===
List of music videos as lead and featured artist, showing directors
| Title | Year | Director(s) | Ref. |
As lead artist
| "Told You" (with Big Toe) | 2022 | Unknown | |
| "Here To Stay" (with SparkyKNE) | 2022 | Unknown | |
As featured artist
| "The Gift" (as part of Sidemen featuring S-X) | 2019 | Konstantin | |
| "Tommy T" (Wiked featuring Tommy T) | 2021 | Unknown | |
| "This or That" (as part of Sidemen) | 2022 | Himself; Miniminter; Behzinga; W2S | |
| "How Many Times" (Eli Porter featuring Tommy T, SparkyKNE and Wiked) | 2024 | Unknown | |
| "Jump Out Gang - Remix" (Eli Porter featuring Tommy T and Pixel Money) | 2025 | Unknown | |

== Bibliography ==
| Year | Title | Publisher | ISBN identifier | Ref. |
|---|---|---|---|---|
| 2016 | Sidemen: The Book | Coronet Books | ISBN 978-1473648166 | |

== Awards and nominations ==
| Year | Award | Category | Recipient(s) | Result | Ref. |
|---|---|---|---|---|---|
| 2017 | British Book Awards | Non-Fiction: Lifestyle Book of the Year | "Sidemen: The Book" (shared with the Sidemen) | Nominated | |
| 2019 | Shorty Awards | Best YouTube Ensemble | Himself (shared with the Sidemen) | Nominated | |
| 2022 | The Streamer Awards | Best Role-Play Streamer | Himself | Nominated | |

=== World records ===
| Publication | Year | World record | R. Status | Ref. |
|---|---|---|---|---|
| Guinness World Records | 2022 | Most viewers for a charity sports match live stream on YouTube | Record | |

=== Listicles ===
| Publisher | Year | Listicle | Result | Ref. |
|---|---|---|---|---|
| The Sunday Times | 2019 | UK's Top 100 Influencer | 9th | |
