= Miniminter =

English influencer and streamer (born 1992)

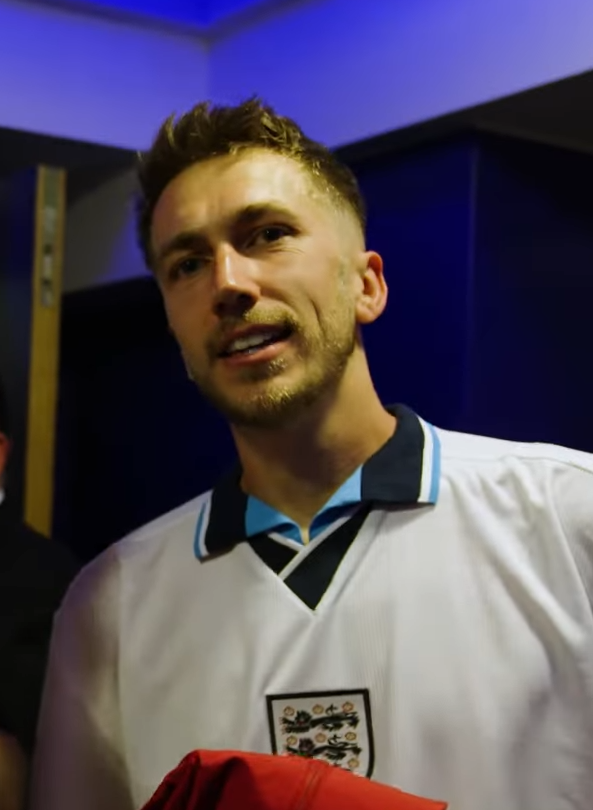
- Minter at Soccer Aid 2024 in June 2024
- Born: Simon Edward Minter; 7 September 1992 (age 34); Hemel Hempstead, Hertfordshire, England
- Education: Berkhamsted School; University of Hull (dropped out)
- Occupations: Influencer; Twitch streamer
- Spouse: Talia Mar (m. 2023)
- Children: 1

Twitch information
- Channel: miniminter
- Years active: 2013–present
- Genres: reaction; gaming
- Followers: 2.1 million

YouTube information
- Years active: 2012–present
- Genres: Gaming; vlog
- Subscribers: 18.2 million (combined)
- Views: 9 billion (combined)
- Last updated: 15 August 2026

Simon Edward Minter (born 7 September 1992), better known as Miniminter, is an English influencer and streamer. He is a member and co-founder of the British influencer group the Sidemen, as well as a co-owner of vodka brand XIX Vodka, clothing brand Sidemen Clothing, restaurant chain Sides, and breakfast cereal brand Best Breakfasts. He is also the co-founder of M7 Education, a non-profit organisation.

Minter's YouTube career started in 2012, primarily focusing on FIFA gaming videos. Over time, he diversified his content, incorporating vlogs, challenges, and collaborations with other influencers. In 2016, he was ranked 17th on Business Insider's list of "The 19 biggest British YouTube stars". As of January 2025, his main YouTube channel has over 10.4 million subscribers and over 4.1 billion views.

== Early life and education ==
Simon Edward Minter was born on 7 September 1992 in Hemel Hempstead, Hertfordshire, England, to British parents. He is the youngest of three siblings. He attended Berkhamsted School, a private boys' school, where he first encountered Olajide "KSI" Olatunji. Although the two initially disliked each other, they later became close friends. During the early stages of KSI's YouTube channel, Minter contributed as a cinematographer and assisted in creating content before starting his own channel.

Minter briefly studied criminology at the University of Hull, but left his studies to pursue a full-time career in YouTube content creation.

== Internet career ==
Minter created his first YouTube channel, Miniminter, in February 2008, though he did not upload his first video until December 2012. He stated that the "mini" part of his username "miniminter" is a reference to his height when he was young and him being the youngest of three children. Inspired by his friend JJ Olatunji, Minter began creating content while still a university student. Shortly thereafter, he decided to quit university to pursue YouTube full-time. His early content primarily consisted of FIFA gameplay, vlogs, challenges, and football videos featuring his friends.

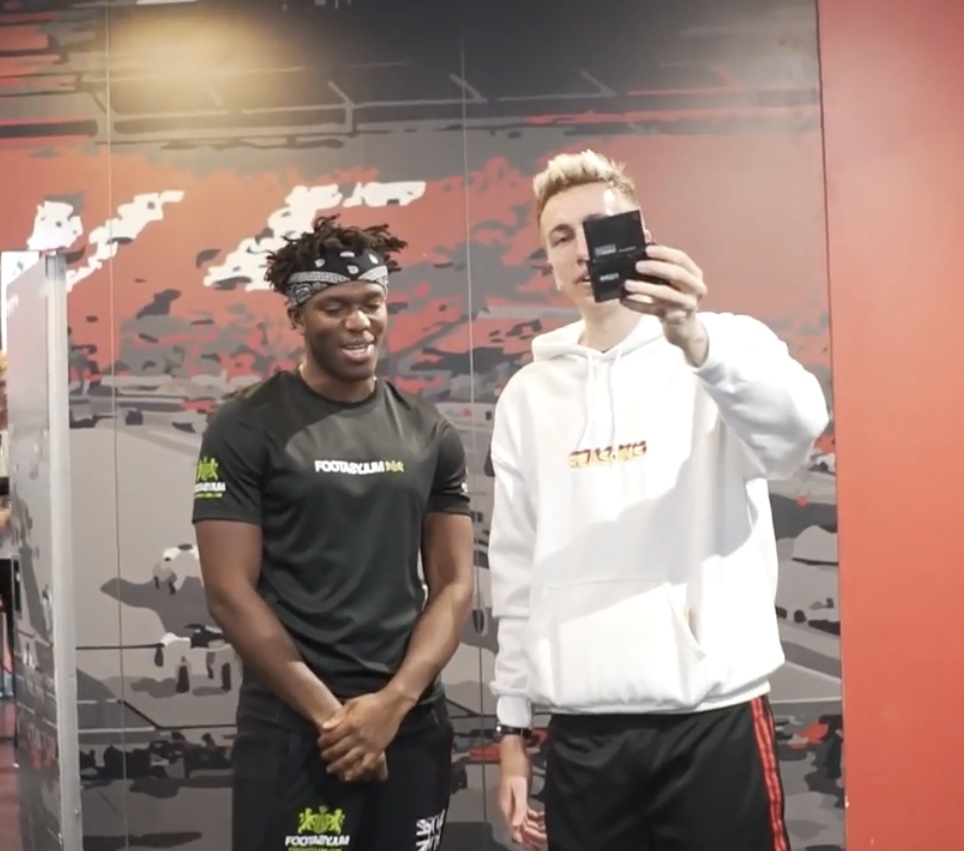
Minter vlogging with KSI in 2018

In September 2013, Minter launched his second YouTube channel, MM7Games. A month later, he along with KSI, Josh Bradley (Zerkaa), Tobi Brown (TBJZL) and Ethan Payne (Behzinga) formed the Rockstar Games Social Club group the Ultimate Sidemen via Grand Theft Auto Online, later simplified to Sidemen. By 2014, the group had expanded to seven members, adding Vikram Barn (Vikkstar123) and Harry Lewis (W2S). The Sidemen are known for their collaborative content, including weekly uploads of challenges, gameplay, and vlogs. Minter's channel gained rapid popularity in 2014, achieving 100,000 subscribers in March and one million subscribers in November.

In 2016, Minter and the Sidemen organised the Upload influencer event, a gathering that allowed fans to interact with the Sidemen and other web video creators. The second and final Upload event took place in September 2017.

In September 2016, he reached five million subscribers. Later in November 2016, he was ranked 17th on Business Insider's list of "The 19 biggest British YouTube stars". He reached 10 million subscribers in May 2022.

== Other ventures ==
=== Business ventures ===
Minter and the Sidemen have founded multiple businesses throughout their online careers. In 2014, the group launched a clothing brand under the Sidemen Clothing banner. In November 2021, they founded the restaurant chain Sides in collaboration with Reef. In October 2022, they launched their own vodka brand named XIX Vodka. In March 2024, they launched the breakfast cereal brand Best Breakfasts in collaboration with Mornflake.

=== What's Good podcast ===
In November 2018, Minter and fellow influencer Randolph created a podcast called the What's Good podcast. The podcast is available on YouTube, Spotify and Apple Podcasts.

=== Investment ===
In July 2023, it was revealed that Minter had invested in notwoways, an East London sneaker brand owned by influencer Callum "Callux" McGinley.

=== Baller League UK ===
In November 2024, it was announced that Minter would manage one of the 12 teams in the upcoming Baller League UK, a six-a-side football competition set to be broadcast on Sky Sports. In March 2025, it was revealed that Minter would manage a team named M7 FC. The team won its first match on 24 March 2025, defeating Wembley Rangers AFC 3–2.

== Personal life ==
In February 2014, Minter moved into the "Sidemen House" with fellow Sidemen members KSI, Zerkaa, and Vikkstar123. From late 2018 through early 2019, the four left the second Sidemen House, and Minter moved into a London flat with Olatunji, where they lived together until 2022.

Minter has been in a relationship with singer and internet personality Talia Mar since 2017. They moved in together in February 2022. On 24 June 2022, it was announced the couple were engaged via Instagram. The couple later got married on 3 June 2023 in Italy. On 24 January 2025, via a music video for the song "365" by Mar, it was announced the couple were expecting their first child. It was announced on 31 January via Minter's video that the couple are expecting a girl. On 19 July 2025, the couple's daughter was born.

Minter is a life-long Leeds United F.C. supporter.

== Philanthropy ==
In October 2019, he donated $10,010 to Team Trees, a project organised by MrBeast and Mark Rober, that plants one tree for every dollar donated.

On 9 June 2024, Minter participated in Soccer Aid 2024, a football charity match held at the Stamford Bridge stadium in London, England, where he played for team England XI.

On 14 February 2025, Minter participated in "Match for Hope 2025", a football charity event hosted in Doha, Qatar, as a player for team AboFlah & KSI, facing off against team Chunkz & IShowSpeed. The match ended with team AboFlah & KSI's 6-5 victory over team Chunkz & IShowSpeed. The event raised more than $10.7 million for charity.

=== M7 Education ===
In December 2018, Minter co-founded M7 Education, a non-profit organisation, with his brother. The organisation focuses on providing students with visual learning experiences through field trips, fully funded by M7 Education, instead of traditional classroom-based methods.

In January 2025, Minter, through M7 Education, partnered with the GLF Schools' Foundation and sneaker retailer Kick Game to provide new trainers to students at Chestnut Park Primary School in West Croydon, London. The initiative aimed to support Year 6 students and members of the school’s rap club by ensuring they had suitable footwear for winter.

== Filmography ==
Film
Year	Title	Role	Notes	Ref.
2018	KSI: Can't Lose	Himself	Documentary	
2022	Talk to Me	Himself	Uncredited; archival footage	
2023	KSI: In Real Life	Himself	Documentary	
2023	The Spy Who Loved Eggnog	Adolf / Tree / Himself	Short film	
2024	The Sidemen Story	Himself	Documentary	
2025	F1	Himself (Attendee)	Film; uncredited background crowd	

Web roles
Year	Title	Role	Platform	Notes	Ref.
2014	The Sidemen Experience	Himself	Comedy Central UK	Web video miniseries; Main role; 5 episodes	
2017	YouTube Rewind	Himself	YouTube	Episode: "The Shape of 2017"	
2018	The Sidemen Show	Himself	YouTube Premium	Main role; 7 episodes	
2024	The Chase: Sidemen Edition	Himself	YouTube	Special spin-off episode	
2026	Exit Strategy	Host	YouTube	Game show created by the Sidemen	

Television roles
Year	Title	Role	Network	Notes	Ref.
2024–present	Inside	Host	YouTube, Side+ (Note: Series 1 was shown on the Sidemen and Moresidemen YouTube channels with extras and unseen moments being shown on Side+. Series 2 onwards will be exclusively on Netflix with companion shows being shown on Side+), Netflix	Reality show created by the Sidemen	
2025–present	Inside USA	Host	Netflix	American reality show created by the Sidemen	
2025–2026	Baller League UK	Himself	Sky Sports Mix	Six-a-side football league	
2026	SideMenu	Himself / Host	YouTube, Amazon Prime Video	Cooking show created by the Sidemen	
2026-present	Outside	Host	Netflix	Spin off series of Inside, created by the Sidemen	

Music videos
Year	Title	Artist(s)	Role	Ref.
2017	"The End"	Vikkstar123	Himself	
2022	"Don't Lie"	A1 x J1 feat. Nemzzz	Himself	
2025	"365"	Talia Mar	Himself	
2025	"Chemical"	Vikkstar, Adalaide Adams	Himself	

== Discography ==
=== Singles ===
Title	Year	Album
"KSI's Little Brother"	2018	Non-album singles
"Fiver"	2018	Non-album singles
"Survive the Night" (with Randy featuring Talia Mar) (Note: Mar is credited in the music video, but uncredited in the standard release.)	2020	Non-album singles
"The Helium Song" (with Randy)	2020	Non-album singles
"Animation" (with Randy)	2021	Non-album singles

=== Other charted songs ===
List of other charted songs, with selected chart positions and album name
Title	Year	Peak chart positions					Album
Title	Year	UK	UK R&B	UK Ind.	NZ Hot	SCO	Album
"The Gift" (as part of Sidemen featuring S-X)	2019	77	40	11	27	26	Non-album singles
"This or That" (as part of Sidemen)	2023	—	—	23	14	—	Non-album singles

=== Guest appearances ===
List of non-single guest appearances, with other performing artists
Title	Year	Other artist(s)	Album
"The Gift"	2019	Sidemen, S-X (Note: S-X is credited in the music video, but uncredited in the sandared release.)	Non-album singles
"This or That"	2022	Sidemen	Non-album singles

=== Music videos ===
List of music videos as lead and featured artist, showing directors
Title	Year	Director(s)	Ref.
As lead artist
"KSI's Little Brother"	2018	Konstantin	
"Survive the Night" (with Randy featuring Talia Mar)	2020	Finn Hitchcock	
"The Helium Song" (with Randy)	2020	Konstantin	
"Animation" (with Randy)	2021	Finn Hitchcock	
As featured artist
"The Gift" (as part of the Sidemen featuring S-X)	2019	Konstantin	
"This or That" (as part of the Sidemen)	2022	Miniminter; W2S; Zerkaa; Behzinga	

== Bibliography ==
Year	Title	Publisher	ISBN identifier	Ref.
2016	Sidemen: The Book	Coronet Books	ISBN 978-1473648166	

== Awards and nominations ==
Year	Award	Category	Recipient(s)	Result	Ref.
2017	British Book Awards	Non-Fiction: A Lifestyle Book	Sidemen: The Book (as a member of the Sidemen)	Nominated	
2019	Shorty Awards	Best YouTube Group	Himself (as a member of the Sidemen)	Nominated	

=== Listicles ===
Publisher	Year	Listicle	Result	Ref.
Business Insider	2016	The 19 biggest British YouTube stars	17th	
