= Behzinga =

English YouTuber (born 1995)

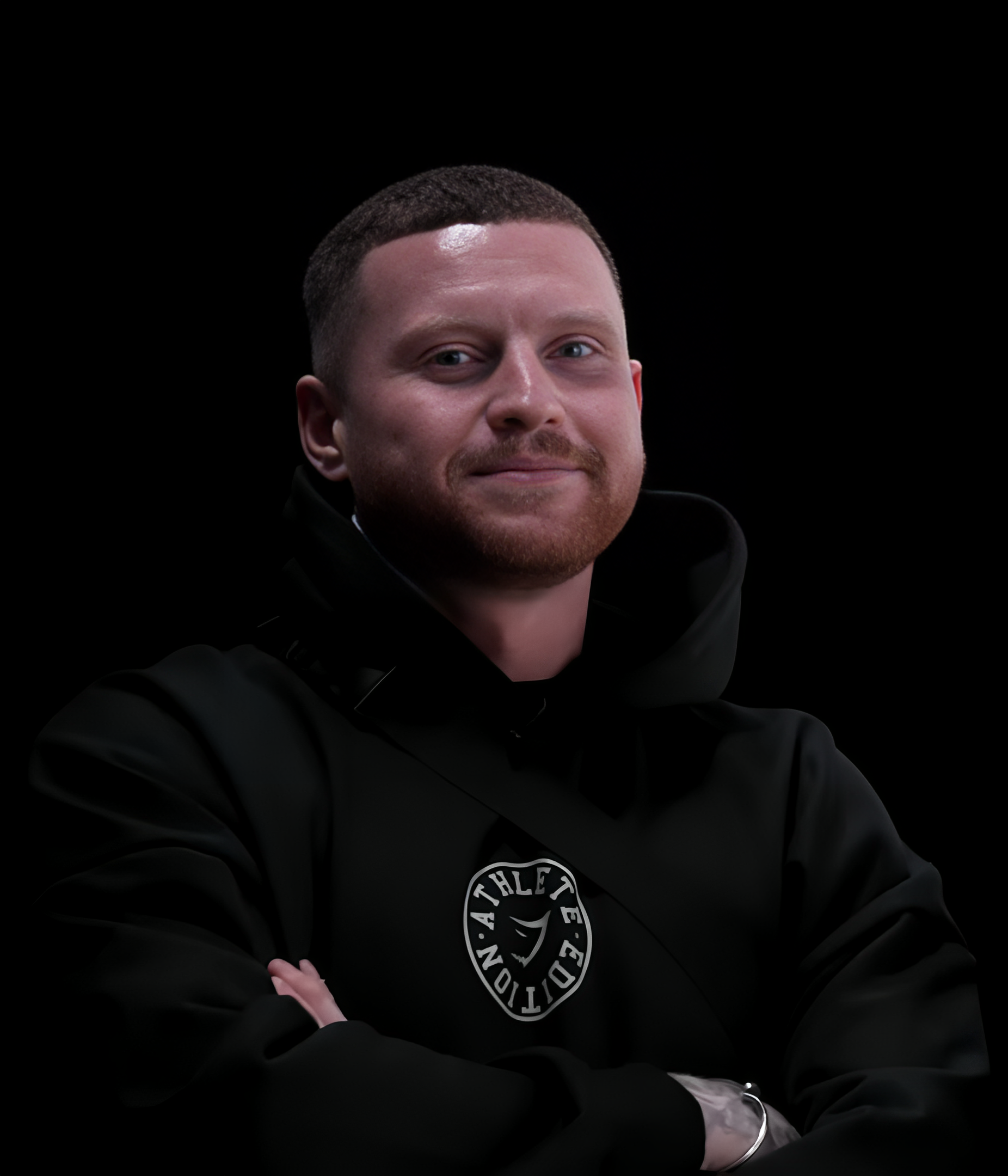
- Payne in 2023
- Born: Ethan Leigh Payne; 20 June 1995 (age 31); London, England
- Education: South Essex College
- Occupations: YouTuber; live streamer; influencer
- Spouse: Faith Kelly (m. 2024)
- Children: 1

Twitch information
- Channel: Behzinga
- Genre: Gaming
- Games: FIFA; PUBG: Battlegrounds
- Followers: 433 thousand

YouTube information
- Channel: Behzinga
- Years active: 2012–present
- Genres: Gaming; association football; comedy; fitness
- Subscribers: 7 million (combined)
- Views: 912 million (combined)
- Last updated: 15 August 2026

Ethan Leigh Payne (born 20 June 1995), better known as Behzinga, is an English YouTuber, streamer, and influencer. He produces videos on gaming, football, comedy, and fitness and is a co-founder and member of the British YouTube group Sidemen. In 2019, Payne was listed as the 31st most influential online creator in the United Kingdom by The Sunday Times. As of October 2025, his main YouTube channel has 4.9 million subscribers and 585 million video views. He is the co-owner of XIX Vodka, Sidemen Clothing, restaurant chain Sides, and cereal brand Best Breakfasts.

== Early life and education ==
Ethan Leigh Payne was born on 20 June 1995 in London and was raised almost entirely by his mother Ruth, who had cancer during his childhood. His biological father left before he was born and his stepfather, whom he had met when he was six months old and believed was his actual father, left when he was thirteen, due to drug addiction and debt. Payne attended Marshalls Park School, and then studied video games development at South Essex College.

== Career ==
Payne registered the "Behzinga" YouTube channel on 24 February 2012 while he was still in school. He explained that the name comes from one of his favourite television series, The Big Bang Theory, in which Sheldon Cooper often uses the catchphrase "Bazinga!"; Payne altered the spelling. His early content primarily featured video game commentaries on the Call of Duty and FIFA video game series. Over time, his style of content diversified to include football, comedy, and fitness videos.

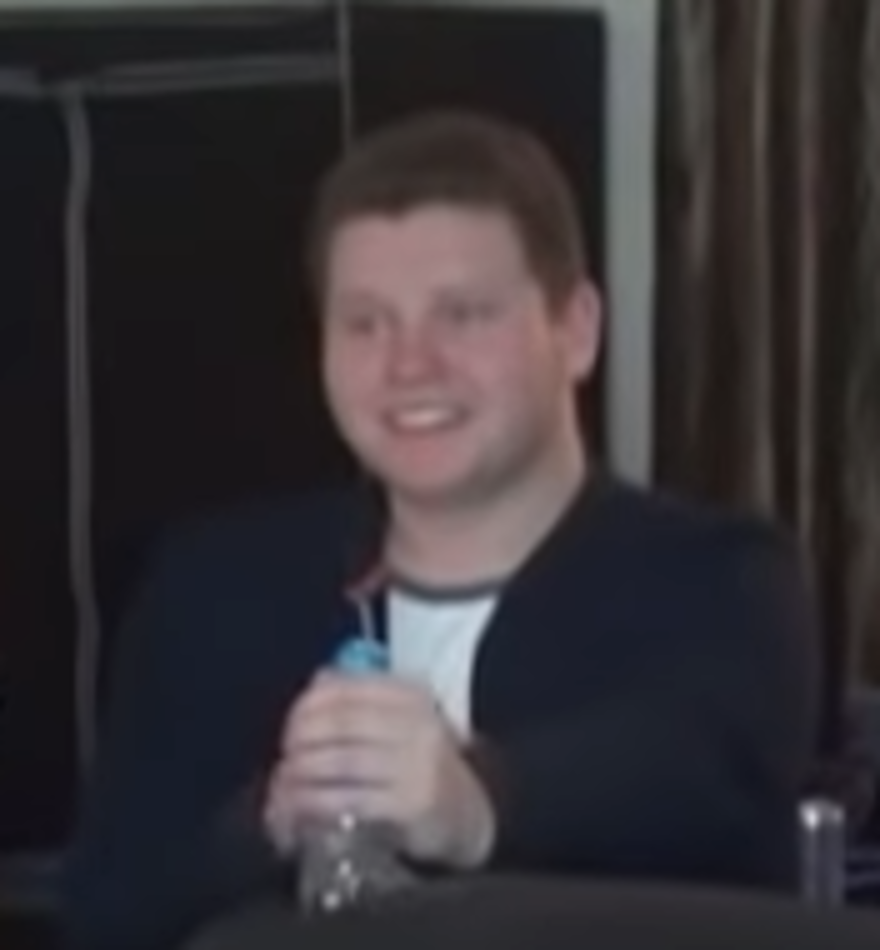
Payne in 2014

On 19 October 2013, Payne and four other British YouTubers formed the entertainment collective Ultimate Sidemen, later shortened to simply Sidemen. Since 2014, the group has consisted of seven British YouTubers: Vikram Barn (Vikkstar123), Joshua Bradley (Zerkaa), Tobi Brown (TBJZL), Harry Lewis (W2S), Simon Minter (Miniminter), formerly JJ Olatunji (KSI), and Payne. The group produces online videos, most often consisting of challenges, sketches, and video-game commentary, as well as selling exclusive Sidemen merchandise.

In September 2019, Payne was listed as the 31st most influential online creator in the United Kingdom by The Sunday Times. That November, he provided commentary for KSI vs. Logan Paul II for Sky Sports Box Office.

== Other ventures ==
=== Business ventures ===
Payne and the Sidemen have founded multiple businesses throughout their online careers. In 2014, the group launched a clothing brand under the Sidemen Clothing banner. In November 2021, they founded the restaurant chain Sides in collaboration with Reef. In October 2022, they launched their own vodka brand named XIX Vodka. In March 2024, they launched the breakfast cereal brand Best Breakfasts in collaboration with Mornflake.

=== Gymshark ===
Payne is sponsored by Gymshark, a British fitness apparel company, as part of the company's brand ambassadors and also the "Gymshark athletes".

=== Growing Paynes podcast ===
Payne and his partner, Faith Louisa Kelly, created and hosted a podcast together called Growing Paynes in July 2023. They posted their first episode on 13 July 2023. The podcast is available on YouTube and Spotify. In September 2023, a clip of the podcast gained attention in which Payne and Kelly were debating about women taking their partner's surnames after marriage. On 25 July 2024, the podcast concluded after a year of weekly uploads. Payne and Kelly cited a lack of time to record episodes whilst raising their daughter.

== Personal life ==
Payne and Kelly have a daughter together, born in September 2022. (Note: Payne, Ethan [@Behzinga] (25 September 2022). "What a weekend, Welcome to the world Olive Ottilie Payne 💚 My heart couldn't be more full, I am beyond proud of @Faithlouisak for everything. Women are super heroes. Forever loving my little family 🫒💚 instagram.com/p/Ci8JtabrI55/…" (Tweet) – via Twitter.) On 3 April 2024, the couple announced their engagement via Instagram. They later got married in December 2024. They currently live together in Essex.

Payne is a supporter of West Ham United F.C. and has appeared on the club's YouTube videos and podcast.

=== Health ===
Payne has become an advocate for mental health and has talked about the importance of sharing feelings and breaking down the stigma surrounding men's mental illness.

In October 2020, he starred in the three-episode YouTube Originals documentary series How to Be Behzinga about his struggle with depression and his path towards running the London Marathon to raise money for the Teenage Cancer Trust. He revealed that he had previously been suffering from alcoholism and wanted to take his own life, but with support from his fellow Sidemen members, he was able to overcome his challenges. Also, during a stretch of time between 2018 and 2019, he had lost 36 kilograms (79 lb).

Payne is asthmatic. On 24 April 2024, he tweeted that he had suffered from a life-threatening asthma attack during a Sidemen YouTube video recording and was hospitalised on 22 April 2024.

== Philanthropy ==
Payne became an ambassador for the Teenage Cancer Trust in September 2022. A year later, he became the charity's first content icon.

In December 2021, Payne participated in a five-a-side football tournament hosted by YouTuber and sports commentator True Geordie and Twitch, raising money for the Alan Shearer Foundation. The event managed to raise more than £100,000.

On 14 February 2025, Payne participated in "Match for Hope 2025", a football charity event hosted in Doha, Qatar, as a player for Team AboFlah & KSI, facing off against Team Chunkz & IShowSpeed. The match ended with team AboFlah & KSI's 6–5 victory over team Chunkz & IShowSpeed. The event raised more than $10.7 million for charity.

== Filmography ==
Film
Year	Title	Role	Notes	Ref.
2018	KSI: Can't Lose	Himself	Documentary	
2022	Talk to Me	Himself	Uncredited; archival footage	
2023	KSI: In Real Life	Himself	Documentary	
2023	The Spy Who Loved Eggnog	Victor / Bartender / Petunia's Father / Himself	Short Film	
2024	The Sidemen Story	Himself	Documentary	

Web roles
Year	Title	Role	Network	Notes	Ref.
2014	The Sidemen Experience	Himself	Comedy Central UK	Main role; 5 episodes	
2017	YouTube Rewind	Himself	YouTube	Episode: "The Shape of 2017"	
2018	The Sidemen Show	Himself	YouTube Premium	Main role; 7 episodes	
2020	MOTDx	Himself	BBC Three	Episode: "05/11/2020"	
2020	How to Be Behzinga	Himself	YouTube	Lead role; 3 episodes	
2020	Hello 2021: UK	Himself	YouTube	Guest	
2021	What Should I Watch?	Himself	YouTube	Guest presenter	
2024	The Chase: Sidemen Edition	Himself	YouTube	Special Spin-Off Episode	
2026	Exit Strategy	Contestant	YouTube	Game show created by the Sidemen, 4th Place	

Television roles
Year	Title	Role	Network	Notes	Ref.
2020	Fighting Fit	Himself	Sky Sports	Episode: "Behzinga"	
2024–present	Inside	Host	YouTube, Side+ (Note: Series 1 was shown on the Sidemen and Moresidemen YouTube channels with extras and unseen moments being shown on Side+. Series 2 onwards will be exclusively on Netflix with companion shows being shown on Side+), Netflix	Reality show created by the Sidemen	
2025–present	Inside USA	Host	Netflix	American reality show created by the Sidemen	
2026	SideMenu	Contestant	YouTube, Amazon Prime Video	Cooking show created by the Sidemen	
2026-present	Outside	Host	Netflix	Spin-off series of Inside, created by the Sidemen	

Music videos
Year	Title	Artist(s)	Role	Ref.
2015	"Lamborghini"	KSI feat. P Money	Himself	
2015	"Test Me"	Jme	Himself	
2015	"Keep Up"	KSI feat. Jme	Himself	
2022	"Don't Lie"	A1 x J1 feat. Nemzzz	Himself	
2023	"Christmas With You (Sha la la la)"	Faith Kelly	Himself	

== Discography ==
=== Charted songs ===
List of other charted songs, with selected chart positions and album name
Title	Year	Peak chart positions		Album
Title	Year	UK Ind.	NZ Hot	Album
"This or That" (as part of Sidemen)	2023	23	14	Non-album single

=== Guest appearances ===
List of non-single guest appearances, with other performing artists
Title	Year	Other artist(s)	Album
"This or That"	2022	Sidemen	Non-album single

=== Music videos ===
List of music videos
Title	Year	Director(s)	Ref.
As lead artist
"Drama"	2017	RvbberDuck	
"Finished"	2017	Konstantin	
As featured artist
"Merry Merry Christmas" (as part of Sidemen featuring Jme and LayZ)	2019	Konstantin	
"This or That" (as part of the Sidemen)	2022	Himself; Miniminter; Zerkaa; Wroetoshaw	

== Bibliography ==
Year	Title	Publisher	ISBN identifier	Ref.
2016	Sidemen: The Book	Coronet Books	ISBN 978-1473648166	

== Awards and nominations ==
Year	Award	Category	Recipient(s)	Result	Ref.
2017	British Book Awards	Non-Fiction: Lifestyle Book of the Year	"Sidemen: The Book" (shared with the Sidemen)	Nominated	
2019	Shorty Awards	Best YouTube Ensemble	Himself (shared with the Sidemen)	Nominated	

=== World Records ===
Publication	Year	World record	Record holder	R. Status	Ref.
Guinness World Records	2022	Most viewers for a charity sports match live stream on YouTube	As member of the Sidemen	Record	
