= Henter =

Henter is a surname. Notable people with the surname include:

- Frank Henter (born 1964), German swimmer
- Ted Henter (born 1950), American computer programmer and businessman

== See also ==
- Hester
- Hunter (surname)
- Menter
