= The Sidemen Story =

- Release poster
- Directed by: Luke Hyams
- Produced by: Sophie Bagha; Sunita Mirchandani; Aaron O'Neill; Jordan Schwarzenberger; Sam Uwins
- Starring: KSI; Miniminter; Zerkaa; Behzinga; Vikkstar; W2S; TBJZL
- Cinematography: Johnny Sachon
- Edited by: Tristan Lancey
- Music by: Graham Langley
- Production companies: Pangaea; Sidemen Productions
- Distributed by: Netflix
- Release date: 14 February 2024
- Running time: 100 minutes
- Country: United Kingdom
- Language: English

The Sidemen Story is a 2024 British documentary film directed by Luke Hyams and released on Netflix. The film focuses on and features the then-seven members of the online influencer group the Sidemen; KSI, Miniminter, Zerkaa, Behzinga, Vikkstar123, W2S and TBJZL. (Note: Attributed to multiple sources.)

== Cast ==
=== Sidemen ===
- KSI (Olajide Olayinka Williams "JJ" Olatunji)
- Miniminter (Simon Edward Minter)
- Zerkaa (Joshua Bradley)
- Behzinga (Ethan Leigh Payne)
- Vikkstar123 (Vikram Singh Barn)
- W2S (Harry Lewis)
- TBJZL (Tobit John Brown)

=== Others ===
- Calfreezy (Callum Airey)
- ChrisMD (Christopher Michael Dixon)
- LazarBeam (Lannan Neville Eacott)
- Kon (Konstantin Ermakov)
- IShowSpeed (Darren Jason Watkins Jr.)
- Jme (Jamie Adenuga)
- Callux (Callum McGingley)
- MrBeast (James Stephen "Jimmy" Donaldson)
- Randolph
