= Zinter =

Zinter is a surname. Notable people with the surname include:

- Alan Zinter (born 1968), American baseball player and coach
- Preston Zinter (born 2004), American football player
- Steven L. Zinter (1950–2018), American judge
- Zak Zinter (born 2001), American football player

== See also ==
- Minter (surname)
- Winter (surname)
- Zinser
