= Menter =

Menter is a surname. Notable people with the surname include:

- Alan Menter (born 1941), British-born South African dermatologist and rugby union footballer
- James Menter (1921–2006), British physicist
- Sophie Menter (1846–1918), German pianist and composer

== See also ==
- Minter (surname)
