= The Sidemen Show =

British web television series

- Genre: Action-adventure; Comedy drama; Reality
- Directed by: Craig Pickles
- Starring: JJ Olatunji; Harry Lewis; Ethan Payne; Vik Barn; Simon Minter; Josh Bradley; Tobi Brown
- Narrated by: Iain Glen
- Composer: James McWilliam
- Country of origin: United Kingdom
- Original language: English
- No. of series: 1
- No. of episodes: 7

Production
- Executive producers: Jago Lee; Austin Long; Dan Lubetkin; James Tooley
- Producer: Chris Lore
- Production locations: Morocco; Austria; London; Wales; Ibiza; Russia
- Running time: 25–34 minutes
- Production companies: Blue Ant Digital Studios; Antenna Pictures

Original release
- Network: YouTube Premium
- Release: 18 June 2018

The Sidemen Show is a British reality stunt web television series starring British YouTube group Sidemen, composed of JJ Olatunji, Harry Lewis, Ethan Payne, Vik Barn, Simon Minter, Josh Bradley, and Tobi Brown. The series is produced by Blue Ant Digital Studios in association with Antenna Pictures, and executive produced by Jago Lee, Dan Lubetkin, Austin Long, and James Tooley, with Craig Pickles serving as the series director and Iain Glen narrating.

The series sees the Sidemen take on stunts and challenges around the world alongside celebrity guests, including Steve-O, Steve Aoki, Jack Whitehall, Kristian Nairn, Jme, Bear Grylls, Nicole Scherzinger, and Sergey Volkov. All seven episodes of the series were released on YouTube Premium on 18 June 2018.

== Cast ==
=== Main ===
- JJ Olatunji
- Harry Lewis
- Ethan Payne
- Vik Barn
- Simon Minter
- Josh Bradley
- Tobi Brown

=== Guest ===
- Steve-O
- Steve Aoki
- Jack Whitehall
- Kristian Nairn
- Jme
- Bear Grylls
- Nicole Scherzinger
- Sergey Volkov

== Episodes ==
No.	Title	Original release date
1	"Sidemen Extreme Desert Race *Explosion*"	18 June 2018
The Sidemen are challenged by Steve-O to join him in Morocco to enrol in his elite action hero academy.
2	"Sidemen Winter Sports Challenges"	18 June 2018
The Sidemen join Steve Aoki on the mountain slopes of Austria to take part in some skiing challenges.
3	"The Great Sidemen Race"	18 June 2018
Jack Whitehall joins the Sidemen to take part in a tuk-tuk race across London.
4	"Sidemen Investigate Most Haunted House"	18 June 2018
Kristian Nairn invites the Sidemen, along with special guest Jme, to join him in investigating the strange things going on in one of the UK's most haunted houses.
5	"Hunting the Sidemen"	18 June 2018
The Sidemen are challenged by Bear Grylls to join him to learn some basic wilderness survival skills.
6	"Sidemen Rescue Nicole Scherzinger"	18 June 2018
Nicole Scherzinger has been kidnapped by her evil twin sister in Ibiza and has challenged the Sidemen to rescue her.
7	"Sidemen Go to Space"	18 June 2018
Cosmonaut Sergey Volkov challenges the Sidemen to join him in Russia and embark on the infamous zero gravity flight, the Vomit Comet.

== Production ==
=== Development ===
On 3 May 2018, after months of speculation that the British YouTube group Sidemen, composed of JJ Olatunji, Harry Lewis, Ethan Payne, Vik Barn, Simon Minter, Josh Bradley, and Tobi Brown, had been working on a secret project, it was announced that the Sidemen would be starring in their own web television series, titled The Sidemen Show, for release on YouTube Red. The series is produced by Blue Ant Digital Studios in association with Antenna Pictures, and executive produced by Jago Lee, Dan Lubetkin, Austin Long, and James Tooley. Craig Pickles serves as the series director and Chris Lore as series producer, with Iain Glen narrating. Deadline Hollywood said it was "thought to be one of the largest YouTube Red commissions for a British production company since Origin".

After the series was announced, Luke Hyams, Head of YouTube Originals in Europe, Middle East, and Africa, stated, "The Sidemen Show remains true to the humor and inclusive camaraderie that have made the guys so popular, but supercharges each episode with challenges, stunts and special guest stars that set this series of adventures apart from anything their fans have seen them do before."

=== Filming ===
Filming for the series took place in various countries, including the United Kingdom, Morocco, Russia, and Austria.

=== Music ===
James McWilliam serves as the primary composer for the series. McWilliam said that it was decided early on "that each episode would have its own musical identity," adding that, "the tone of the music for each episode was largely decided by [Pickles], the director." The Sidemen also contributed "invaluable" feedback on the score, since they had many years of experience making videos, "and often changed the direction into something they felt was more suitable," said McWilliam.

== Release ==
The series, consisting of seven 30-minute episodes, was released on 18 June 2018 on the Sidemen YouTube channel exclusively through YouTube Premium, the paid subscription arm of YouTube, which had previously been called YouTube Red, but rebranded that day to YouTube Premium when it launched in 12 new countries including the United Kingdom and Canada. At the time of launch, only the first episode was available to watch for free, but on 8 April 2020, YouTube removed the paywall for the remaining six episodes. It was announced at the time to be temporary while people were under stay-at-home orders due to the COVID-19 pandemic, but it has turned out to be a permanent decision; all episodes have remained freely available since.

=== Marketing ===
The Sidemen officially confirmed the series with the release of an exclusive teaser trailer on 23 May 2018. The series' official trailer was released on 2 June 2018, following the group's third charity football match, which took place that day.
