= Wroetoshaw =

British YouTuber (born 1996)

- Lewis in 2024
- Born: Harry Christopher George Lewis; 24 November 1996 (age 29); Guernsey, Channel Islands
- Occupations: YouTuber; influencer; businessman; livestreamer

Twitch information
- Channel: W2S
- Genre: Gaming
- Game: FIFA
- Followers: 1.1 million

YouTube information
- Channel: W2S
- Years active: 2012–present
- Genres: Gaming; association football; vlog
- Subscribers: 20.7 million (combined)
- Views: 4.8 billion (combined)
- Last updated: 20 June 2026

Harry Christopher George Lewis (born 24 November 1996), better known online as W2S (shortened from Wroetoshaw), is an English YouTuber, streamer, and influencer from Guernsey. He is a member and co-founder of the British YouTube collective Sidemen. Lewis is the co-owner of XIX Vodka, Sidemen Clothing, restaurant chain Sides, and cereal brand Best Breakfasts. In 2016, he was listed as one of the nineteen biggest British YouTube stars by Business Insider. In 2026, he was listed in the Europe Sports & Games category of Forbes 30 Under 30.

== Early life ==
Born in Guernsey, Lewis was raised in Alderney until his family moved back to Guernsey in 2004. He attended Guernsey Grammar School. He has two younger siblings named Rosie and Josh. Lewis has often stated that he has French ancestry.

== Online career ==
Lewis initially had several YouTube channels, on which he would experiment with various ideas before setting up his main YouTube channel "Wroetoshaw" in 2012, and uploading primarily FIFA and association football content. The YouTube channel name is a contraction of the names of football players Nicky Wroe and Tom Bradshaw. Lewis was the last member to join the British collective, Sidemen, in 2014, after being approached by Zerkaa at a FIFA gaming event in New York City earlier that year. Lewis was described as "a superstar before the Sidemen" and that he was falling in with the wrong crowds within YouTube and the Sidemen decided to take him under their wing. As of 2025, Lewis' main channel, "W2S", has over 16 million subscribers. Lewis has not published any videos on his main channel since 2020, instead publishing on "W2S+".

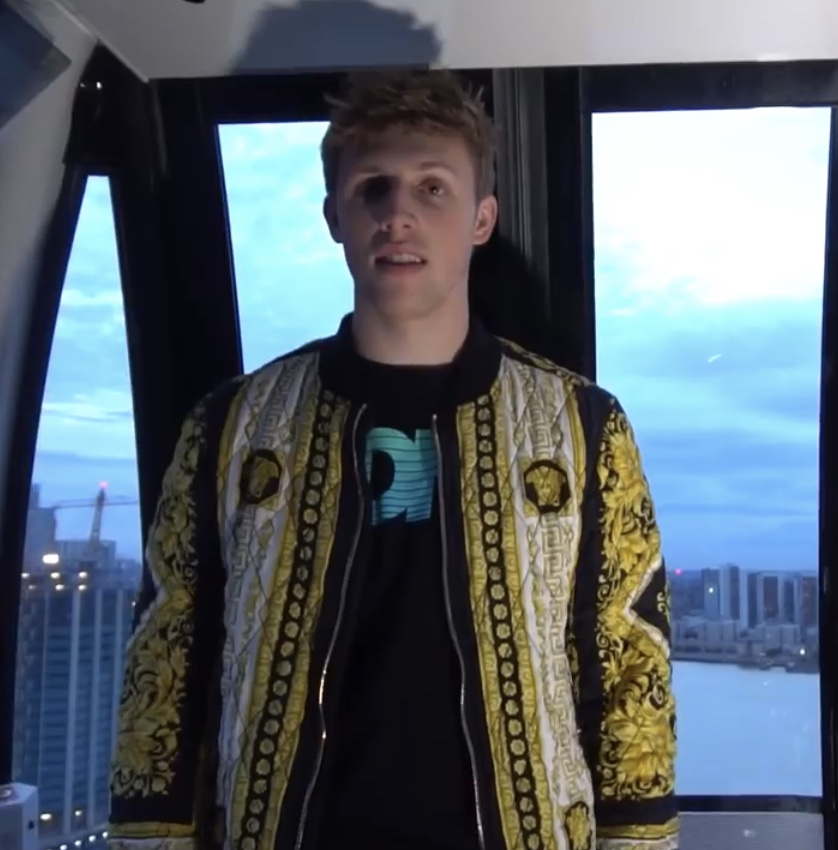
Lewis in 2017

In 2017, Lewis received a YouTube Diamond Play Button for surpassing 10 million subscribers on the platform.

In 2018, Lewis set a Guinness World Record for having the most subscribers and views for a dedicated FIFA channel.

After managing to keep his hand on a $2.5 million private jet longer than 11 other influencers in a MrBeast video in 2022, Lewis won the jet, gifting it to his siblings.

In April 2026, Lewis was included in the Forbes 30 Under 30 Europe Sports & Games list.

== Other ventures ==
=== Sidemen businesses ===
Lewis and the Sidemen have founded multiple businesses throughout their online careers. In 2014, the group launched a clothing brand under the Sidemen Clothing banner. In November 2021, they founded the restaurant chain Sides in collaboration with Reef. In October 2022, they launched their own vodka brand named XIX Vodka. In March 2024, they launched the breakfast cereal brand Best Cereal in collaboration with Mornflake.

=== Kicktown ===
In late 2019, Lewis opened Kicktown, an interactive football challenge experience in The O2 Arena. The experience focused on allowing customers to do various football tricks and record their attempts.

=== Music ===
Lewis has written and uploaded multiple songs on YouTube. On 8 August 2017, he uploaded "KSI Sucks", a diss track aimed at KSI and RiceGum as a response to KSI "leaving" the Sidemen. Lewis uploaded another diss track aimed at KSI titled "KSI Exposed", however the video was removed from YouTube by Lewis, who said he took the video too far. He has also featured on Sidemen songs "Merry Merry Christmas", featuring LayZ and Jme, as well as "This or That", which charted number 23 on the UK Independent Singles Chart and number 14 on the New Zealand Hot Singles Chart.

== Personal life ==
Lewis supports football club Chelsea. In a Sidemen video that was released in August 2021, Lewis revealed he has koumpounophobia, the fear of buttons.

== Filmography ==
Film
Year	Title	Role	Notes	Ref.
2022	Talk to Me	Himself	Uncredited; archival footage	
2023	KSI: In Real Life	Himself	Documentary	
2023	The Spy Who Loved Eggnog	Petunia / Local Alcoholic	Short film	
2024	The Sidemen Story	Himself	Documentary	

Web roles
Year	Title	Role	Network	Notes	Ref.
2014	The Sidemen Experience	Himself	Comedy Central UK	Main role; 5 episodes	
2018	The Sidemen Show	Himself	YouTube Premium	Main role; 7 episodes	
2024	The Chase: Sidemen Edition	Himself	YouTube	Special spin-off episode	
2026	Exit Strategy	Contestant	YouTube	Game show created by the Sidemen; 5th place	

Television roles
Year	Title	Role	Network	Notes	Ref.
2024–present	Inside	Host	YouTube, Side+ (Note: Series 1 was shown on the Sidemen and Moresidemen YouTube channels with extras and unseen moments being shown on Side+. Series 2 onwards will be exclusively on Netflix with companion shows being shown on Side+), Netflix	Reality show created by the Sidemen	
2025–present	Inside USA	Host	Netflix	American reality show created by the Sidemen	
2026	SideMenu	Himself / Host	YouTube, Amazon Prime Video	Cooking show created by the Sidemen	
2026-present	Outside	Host	Netflix	Spin-off series of Inside, created by the Sidemen	

Music videos
Year	Title	Artist(s)	Role	Ref.
2022	"Don't Lie"	A1 x J1 feat. Nemzzz	Himself	

== Discography ==
=== Charted songs ===
List of other charted songs, with selected chart positions and album name
Title	Year	Peak chart positions		Album
Title	Year	UK Ind.	NZ Hot	Album
"This or That" (as part of Sidemen)	2023	23	14	Non-album single

=== Guest appearances ===
List of non-single guest appearances, with other performing artists
Title	Year	Other artist(s)	Album
"This or That"	2022	Sidemen	Non-album single

=== Music videos ===
List of music videos as lead and featured artist, showing directors
Title	Year	Director(s)	Ref.
As lead artist
"KSI Sucks"	2017	PimpJuiceK	
"RiceGum Sucks"	2017	Konstantin	
"KSI Exposed"	2017	Unknown	
As featured artist
"Merry Merry Christmas" (as part of the Sidemen featuring Jme and LayZ)	2019	Konstantin	
"This or That" (as part of the Sidemen)	2022	Himself, Miniminter, Zerkaa, Behzinga	

== Bibliography ==
Year	Title	Publisher	ISBN identifier	Ref.
2016	Sidemen: The Book	Coronet Books	ISBN 978-1473648166	

== Awards and nominations ==
Year	Award	Category	Recipient(s)	Result	Ref.
2017	British Book Awards	Non-Fiction: A Lifestyle Book	Sidemen: The Book (shared with the Sidemen)	Nominated	
2019	Shorty Awards	Best YouTube Group	Himself (shared with the Sidemen)	Nominated	

=== World Records ===
Publication	Year	World record	Record holder	R. Status	Ref.
Guinness World Records	2018	Most subscribers and views for a dedicated FIFA Channel	Himself	Record	
Guinness World Records	2022	Most viewers for a charity sports match live stream on YouTube	Himself (shared with the Sidemen)	Record	
Guinness World Records	2023	Most viewed crossbar challenge video on YouTube	Himself	Record	
