= Humans (song) =

2023 single by Vikkstar

Single by Vikkstar featuring Shaun Farrugia
- Released: 1 December 2023
- Genre: EDM • Progressive House
- Length: 3:43
- Label: Funfair
- Songwriters: Frank Nobel; Linus Nordström; Ollie Green; Shaun Farrugia; Vikram Barn
- Producers: Goldfingers; Vikram Barn

Vikkstar singles chronology
"Better Off (Alone, Pt. III)" (2023)	"Humans" (2023)	"Know Me Better" (2024)

Shaun Farrugia singles chronology
"Vertigo" (2023)	"Humans" (2023)	"Chemicals" (2024)

Music video
- "Humans" on YouTube

"Humans" is a song by British YouTuber and DJ Vikram Barn better known as Vikkstar featuring Maltese singer Shaun Farrugia released by Funfair on 1 December 2023. The song is Barn's second single following the release of "Better Off (Alone, Pt. III)" with Alan Walker and Dash Berlin and is Farrugia's third EDM single following two collaborations with Martin Garrix. The song peaked at number one in Malta.

== Background ==
Barn said that he was "really excited" for his first solo release and that it was not something he had "ever expected to be doing" in his career. Barn further stated that support from his audience allows him to "try new things" and that the song itself has a "strong message that should hopefully resonate with the audience and people who come across it".

== Critical reception ==
Malta Daily described the song as being a "soulful blend of Shaun Farrugia's emotive vocals and Vikkstar's EDM production skills" that "resonates with listeners on a profound level". The website added that the song is about the "shared experiences, struggles, and triumphs that connect us all, making it a universal anthem of unity and understanding". Alexander Bouten of Festivalling described the song as a "big room anthem" and stated that the vocal hook was influenced by contemporaries such as Avicii and Calvin Harris.

== Charts ==
Chart performance for "Humans"
Chart (2023–2024)	Peak position
Malta Domestic Airplay (BMAT PRS)	1
UK Physical Singles (OCC)	6
UK Singles Sales (OCC)	12

== See also ==
- List of number-one singles of the 2020s (Malta)
