= Vikkstar123 =

English influencer and DJ (born 1995)

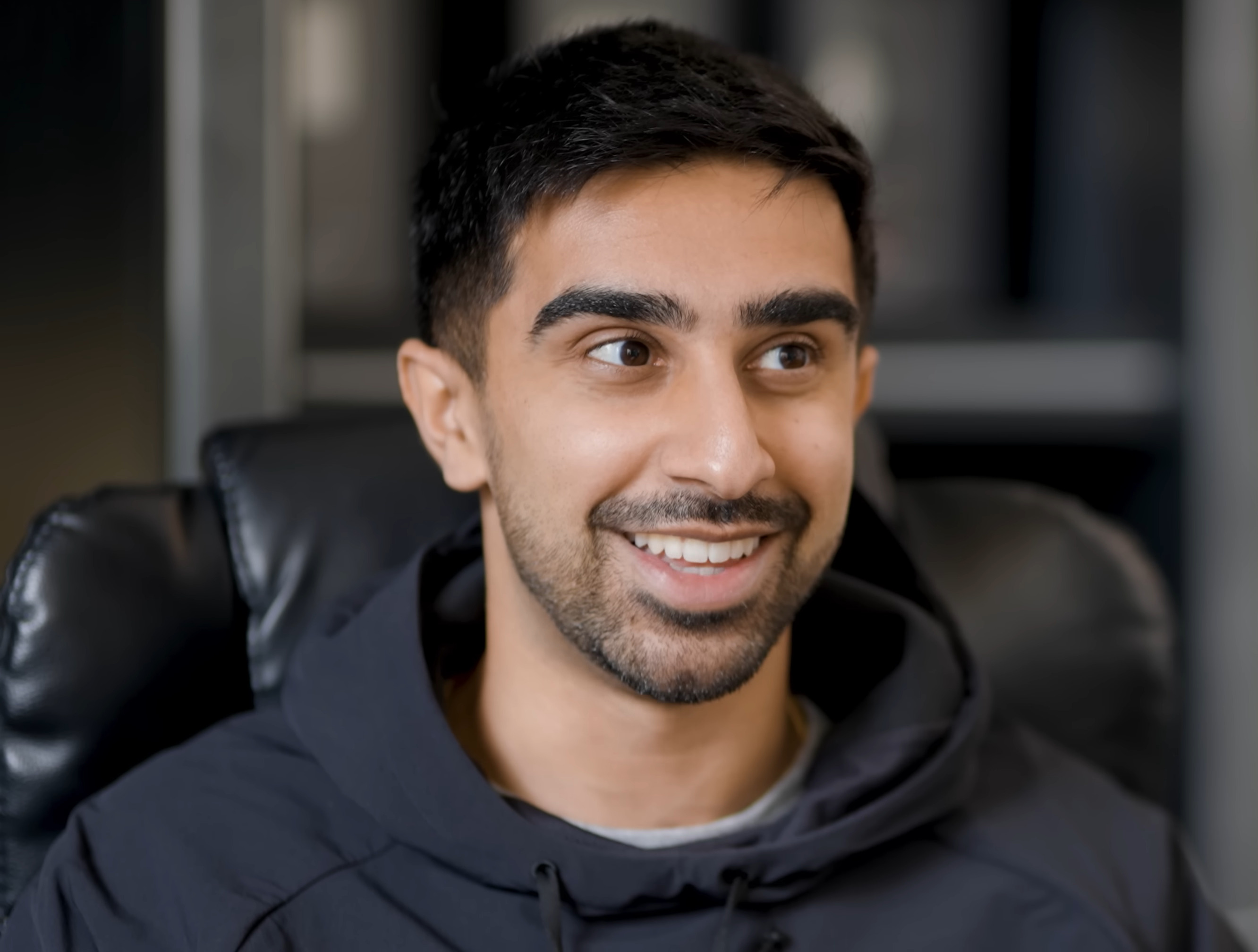
- Barn in 2022
- Born: Vikram Singh Barn; 2 August 1995 (age 31); Guildford, Surrey, England
- Other name: Vikkstar
- Occupations: YouTuber; online streamer; DJ; music producer
- Spouse: Ellie Harlow (m. 2023)

YouTube information
- Channel: Vikkstar123
- Years active: 2010–present
- Genres: Gaming; vlog
- Subscribers: 12.0 million (combined)
- Views: 3.9 billion (combined)
- Musical career
- Genres: Electronic; electro-house; progressive house; future house; deep house
- Years active: 2023–present
- Last updated: 15 August 2026

Vikram Singh Barn (born 2 August 1995), better known as Vikkstar123 or simply Vikkstar, is an English YouTuber and DJ. He is a member of the YouTube group the Sidemen.

Barn's YouTube career started in 2010, primarily focusing Call of Duty let's play videos. Over time, he diversified his content, incorporating vlogs, challenges, and collaborations with other influencers. As of June 2025, his main YouTube channel has over 7.57 million subscribers and over 2.18 billion views.

== Early life and education ==
Barn is of Indian descent and was born on 2 August 1995 in Guildford, Surrey, England, where he lived until eight years of age. He moved to Sheffield where he attended Silverdale School. Barn was offered a place to study natural sciences at University College London, but he ended up declining the offer in order to pursue his YouTube career full-time. He is the youngest of three children.

== Online career ==
Barn joined YouTube in 2010; having played games with his friends, he got into watching YouTubers and making videos of their own. Eventually, he decided to launch his own channel, initially creating gaming and tutorial videos on Call of Duty: Modern Warfare 2. As his popularity increased, he began to take it more seriously, branching out into Minecraft.

He moved in with three other members of the Sidemen, sharing a house with them from 2014 to 2018, when he announced he was moving out of the Sidemen House. He was a member of the Minecraft group the Pack along with JeromeASF, Lachlan, PrestonPlayz, Woofless, and Bajan Canadian. He was also part of the Dream SMP server.

In January 2021, he announced on his channel that he was quitting playing Call of Duty: Warzone due to a proliferation of cheating, saying hackers would be "the death of the game" if it went unfixed. Along with criticism from several other high-profile streamers, the resulting uproar caused Activision to update the game's anti-cheat software. On 13 July 2024, Barn appeared in a MrBeast video titled "50 YouTubers Fight for $1,000,000".

== Music career ==
On 15 August 2017, Barn released "The End" on YouTube. The song was a diss track aimed at Deji Olatunji (previously known as ComedyShortsGamer), following Olatunji's "Sidemen Diss Track", released on 11 August 2017. As of August 2025, the music video has over 30 million views.

On 5 December 2022, Barn, KSI, and TBJZL released a Christmas-themed charity single titled "Christmas Drillings" under the Sidemen banner featuring Jme, which charted at number 3 on the UK Singles Chart.

In 2023, Barn began his music career by releasing singles as a DJ and music producer. On 28 September, Barn released his debut single "Better Off (Alone, Pt. III)" with Alan Walker and Dash Berlin, which charted at number 1 on the Association of Hungarian Record Companies. On 1 December, Barn released "Humans" with Shaun Farrugia.

On 25 April 2024, Barn released "Know Me Better" with Masked Wolf featuring Jme. On 16 August, Barn released "Have It All" with RetroVision and Dyson. On 8 November, Barn released "Where Do I Go" with Nicky Romero, Alpharock, and Oaks.

== Other ventures ==
=== Sidemen businesses ===
Barn and the Sidemen have founded multiple businesses throughout their online careers. In 2014, the group launched a clothing brand under the Sidemen Clothing banner. In November 2021, they founded a restaurant chain known as Sides in collaboration with Reef. In October 2022, they launched their own vodka brand known as XIX Vodka. In March 2024, they launched a breakfast cereal brand known as Best Cereal in collaboration with Mornflake.

=== Investment ===
In January 2021, it was revealed that Barn had invested in the London Royal Ravens, a Call of Duty esports team, speaking of his desire to 'build a blueprint' for the wider popularisation of the sport.

In July 2023, Barn invested in notwoways, an East London sneaker brand owned by fellow YouTuber and friend Callum "Callux" McGinley.

=== Circulr ===
On 3 August 2023, it was announced that Barn would be joining as the new co-founder of British eyewear brand Circulr.

== Personal life ==
Barn privately began dating a woman named Ellie Harlow in 2019, although she later appeared in Barn's social media posts beginning in 2020. They became engaged at the Burj Al Arab in December 2021, and married in September 2023. In a Sidemen video released in March 2024, Barn revealed he has Crohn's disease.

== Filmography ==
Film
Year	Title	Role	Notes	Ref.
2022	Talk to Me	Himself	Uncredited; archival footage	
2023	KSI: In Real Life	Himself	Documentary	
2023	The Naughty List	The Baker	Short film	
2024	The Sidemen Story	Himself	Documentary	

Web
Year	Title	Role	Network	Notes	Ref.
2014	The Sidemen Experience	Himself	Comedy Central UK	Main role; 5 episodes	
2016–2017	YouTube Rewind	Himself	YouTube	Episode: "The Ultimate 2016 Challenge"; Episode: "The Shape of 2017"	
2018	The Sidemen Show	Himself	YouTube Premium	Main role; 7 episodes	
2020	How to Be Behzinga	Himself	YouTube	1 episode	
2024	The Chase: Sidemen Edition	The Chaser	YouTube	Special spin-off episode	

Television
Year	Title	Role	Network	Notes	Ref.
2021	The Wheel	Himself / Celebrity expert (Gaming)	BBC One	Series 1, episode 6	
2023	Untold	Himself	Channel 4	Episode: The Cost of Being A YouTuber	
2024–present	Inside	Host	YouTube, Side+, (Note: Series 1 was shown on the Sidemen and Moresidemen YouTube channels with extras and unseen moments being shown on Side+. Series 2 onwards will be exclusively on Netflix with companion shows being shown on Side+) Netflix	Reality show created by the Sidemen	
2025–present	Inside USA	Host	Netflix	American reality show created by the Sidemen	
2026	SideMenu	Contestant	YouTube, Amazon Prime Video	Cooking show created by the Sidemen	
2026–present	Outside	Host	Netflix	Spin off series of Inside, created by the Sidemen	

Music videos
Year	Title	Artist(s)	Role	Ref.
2018	"Manchild"	Randolph	Himself	
2022	"Don't Lie"	A1 x J1 featuring Nemzzz	Himself	
2025	"365"	Talia Mar	Himself	

== Discography ==
=== Singles ===
List of singles, with selected peak chart positions
Title	Year	Peak chart positions			Certifications	Album
Title	Year	HUN	MLT Dom. Air.	NOR	Certifications	Album
"Better Off (Alone, Pt. III)" (with Alan Walker and Dash Berlin)	2023	1	—	30	MC: Gold	Walkerworld (Note: "Better Off (Alone, Pt. III)" is absent from the Apple Music release of Walkerworld.)
"Humans" (featuring Shaun Farrugia)	2023	—	1	—		Non-album singles
"Know Me Better" (with Masked Wolf featuring Jme)	2024	—	—	—		Non-album singles
"Have It All" (with RetroVision and Dyson)	2024	—	—	—		Non-album singles
"Where Do I Go" (with Nicky Romero, Alpharock, and Oaks)	2024	—	—	—		Non-album singles
"Another Way" (with Syn Cole and KDH featuring Joe Jury)	2025	—	—	—		Non-album singles
"Chemical" (featuring Adalaide Adams)	2025	—	—	—		Non-album singles
"Hole in the Head" (with Sick Individuals)	2025	—	—	—		Non-album singles
"All This Time" (with Steve Aoki featuring Ekko)	2025	—	—	—		Hiroquest 3: Paragon
"Lonely Together" (with Sickick and Aloe Blacc)	2025	—	—	—		Non-album singles
"Before We Say Goodbye" (with Madism and Wukong)	2025	—	—	—		Non-album singles
"Where Have You Been" (with ARTY featuring Annie Schindel)	2026	—	—	—		Non-album singles
"Bigger Than Dreams" (with Matt Pridgyn and Jex)	2026	—	—	—		Non-album singles
"Your Mind"	2026	—	—	—		Non-album singles
"Call My Bluff" (with Brooks and Jex)	2026	—	—	—		Non-album singles
"Back To Me" (with Afrojack featuring Laura White)	2026	_	_	_		Non-album singles
"—" denotes single that did not chart or were not released in that territory.

=== Charity singles ===
List of charity singles, with selected chart positions
Title	Year	Peak chart positions				Notes
Title	Year	UK	UK Ind.	IRE	NZ Hot	Notes
"Christmas Drillings" (as part of Sidemen featuring Jme)	2022	3	2	25	7	Produced for a Sidemen Sunday video and raised money for FareShare.

=== Remixes ===
List of remixes
Title	Year	Album
"Barcelona" (Vikkstar Remix) (with Alan Walker and Ina Wroldsen)	2024	Barcelona (Remixes)
"Man Don't Care" (Vikkstar Remix) (with Jme)	2026	Non-album singles
"Where Have You Been" (Vikkstar Remix) (with Arty featuring Annie Schindel)	2026	Non-album singles

=== Music videos ===
List of music videos
Title	Year	Director(s)	Ref.
As lead artist
"The End"	2017	PimpJuiceK	
"Better Off (Alone, Pt. III)" (with Alan Walker and Dash Berlin)	2023	Mads Neset	
"Humans" (with Shaun Farrugia)	2023	Troy Roscoe	
"Know Me Better" (with Masked Wolf featuring Jme)	2024	Guy Davies	
"Where Do I Go" (with Nicky Romero, Alpharock and Oaks)	2024	Unknown	
"Chemical" (AI Video) (with Adalaide Adams)	2025	Unknown	
"Chemical" (with Adalaide Adams)	2025	Tobi Brown	
As featured artist
"Merry Merry Christmas" (as part of Sidemen featuring Jme and LayZ)	2019	Konstantin	
"Christmas Drillings" (as part of Sidemen featuring Jme)	2022	Konstantin	
"Barcelona" (Alan Walker and Ina Wroldsen featuring Vikkstar)	2024	Unknown	

== Bibliography ==
Year	Title	Publisher	ISBN identifier	Ref.
2016	Sidemen: The Book	Coronet Books	ISBN 978-1473648166	

== Awards and nominations ==
Year	Award	Category	Recipient(s)	Result	Ref.
2016	NME Awards	Vlogger of the Year	Himself	Nominated	
2017	Teen Choice Awards	Choice Gamer	Himself	Nominated	
2017	British Book Awards	Non-Fiction: Lifestyle Book of the Year	"Sidemen: The Book" (shared with the Sidemen)	Nominated	
2019	Shorty Awards	Best YouTube Ensemble	Himself (shared with the Sidemen)	Nominated	

=== World records ===
Publication	Year	World record	Record holder	R. status	Ref.
Guinness World Records	2022	Most viewers for a charity sports match live stream on YouTube	As member of the Sidemen	Record	
