= Sidemen =

British Internet celebrity group

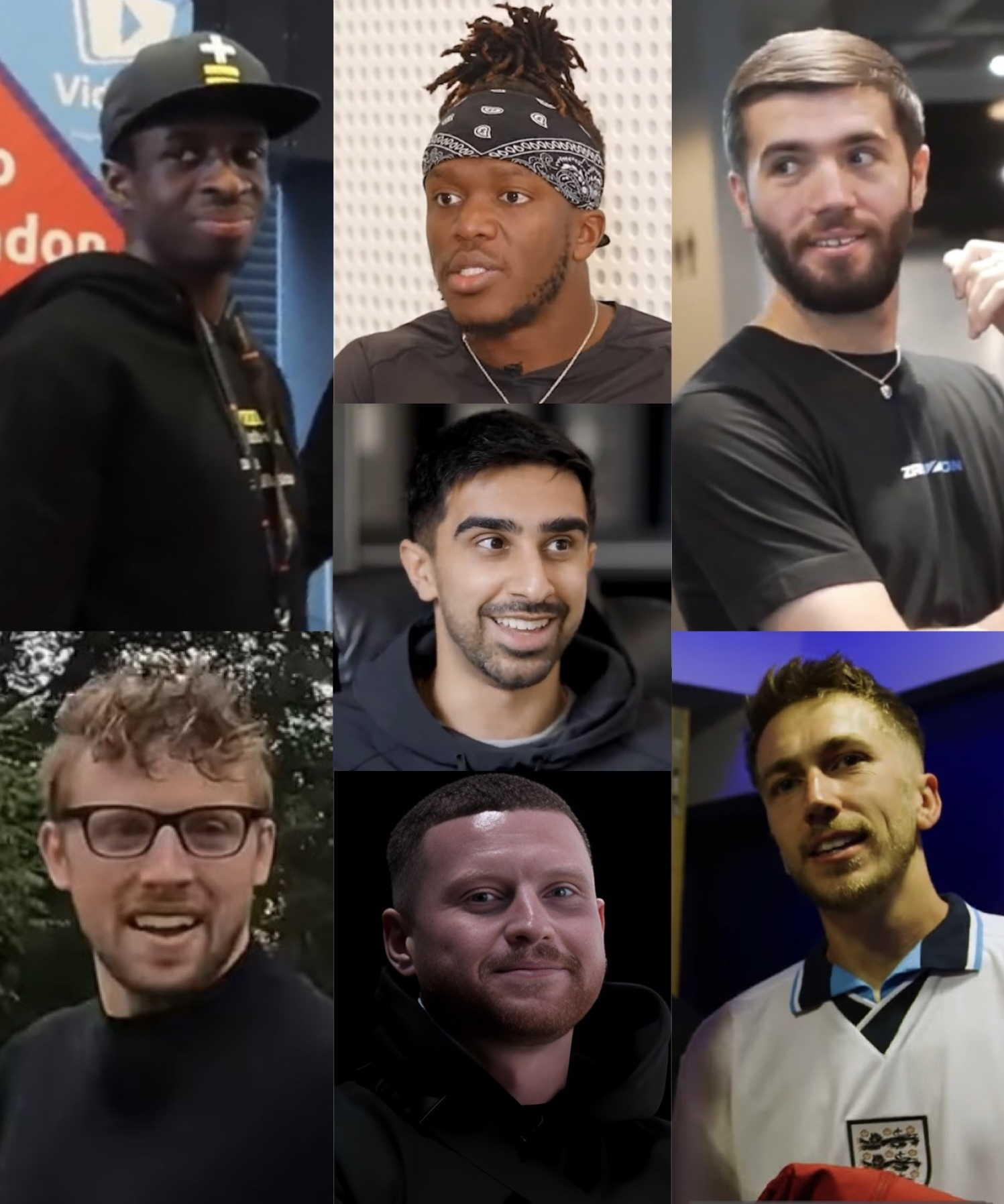
- Top to bottom from left column: Brown, Lewis, former member Olatunji, Barn, Payne, Bradley, and Minter.
- Born: Joshua Charlie Joseph Bradley (Zerkaa); 4 September 1992 (age 34); Simon Edward Minter (Miniminter); 7 September 1992 (age 34); Tobit John Brown (TBJZL); 8 April 1993 (age 33); Ethan Leigh Payne (Behzinga); 20 June 1995 (age 31); Vikram Singh Barn (Vikkstar123); 2 August 1995 (age 31); Harry Christopher George Lewis (Wroetoshaw); 24 November 1996 (age 29)
- Occupation: YouTubers

Instagram information
- Page: Sidemen
- Years active: 2018–present
- Followers: 6.1 million

TikTok information
- Page: Sidemen
- Years active: 2020–present
- Followers: 7.5 million

X information
- Handle: @Sidemen
- Display name: Sidemen
- Years active: 2019–present
- Followers: 2.3 million

YouTube information
- Channel: Sidemen
- Years active: 2013–present
- Genres: Entertainment; gaming; vlog; reaction
- Subscribers: 155.6 million (combined) (Note: Includes the Sidemen's five group channels and twenty-four of their individual channels which host Sidemen content.)
- Views: 43.6 billion (combined)
- Last updated: 9 February 2024
- Website: sidemen.com

The Sidemen (SDMN) are a British collective consisting of YouTubers, social media influencers and internet personalities Miniminter, Zerkaa, Vikkstar123, TBJZL, Behzinga, Wroetoshaw, and formerly KSI. The group produce videos of various challenges, sketches, and video game commentaries across their YouTube channels, which have a combined total of over 155 million subscribers as of May 2025.

Beyond their YouTube content, the Sidemen have expanded into various business ventures. They launched Sidemen Clothing in 2014, followed by the restaurant chain Sides and the subscription service app Side+ in 2021, their own alcoholic beverage line XIX Vodka in 2022, and their cereal brand Best Cereal in 2024. The group has also further extended their influence into web series and documentary filmmaking. In 2018, they starred in The Sidemen Show, a YouTube Premium series featuring celebrity guests and global challenges. In 2024, the Netflix documentary The Sidemen Story was released, detailing their decade-long journey and the impact they have had on internet culture. Later that year, they created their own reality game show, Inside.

The Sidemen have also been actively involved in philanthropy, organising Sidemen charity football matches since 2016, which have collectively raised over £14.7 million for charitable organisations in the United Kingdom.

== Members ==
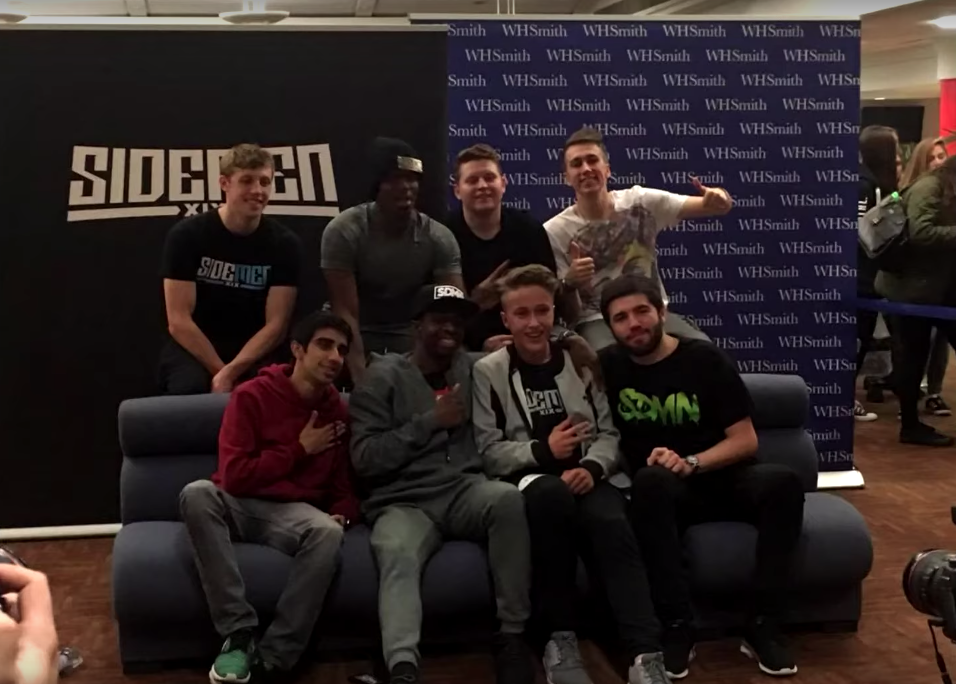
The Sidemen taking photos with a fan during their book tour in 2016.

The group has the following members:

- Simon Minter – known online as Miniminter (2013–present)
- Joshua "Josh" Bradley – known online as Zerkaa (2013–present)
- Vikram Barn – known online as Vikkstar123 (2013–present)
- Tobit "Tobi" Brown – known online as Tobjizzle or TBJZL (2013–present)
- Ethan Payne – known online as Behzinga (2013–present)
- Harry Lewis – known online as Wroetoshaw or W2S (2014–present)

Former members:

- Olajide "JJ" Olatunji – known online as KSI (2013–2026)

== History ==
=== 2013–2020: Origins and initial popularity ===
Some of the members knew each other before the group was formed. Bradley and Brown both attended Bexley Grammar School in London and Olatunji and Minter both attended Berkhamsted School in Hertfordshire.

The group originates from a Rockstar Games Social Club group made on 19 October 2013 in Grand Theft Auto Online, called "The Ultimate Sidemen", which included all the members except for Lewis. In January 2014, Bradley met Lewis while at a FIFA gaming event in New York City and invited him to join the group. Describing the group name, Minter said in a video that "A sideman is basically someone's bitch who just follows them around [...] I was basically JJ's bitch that followed him around."

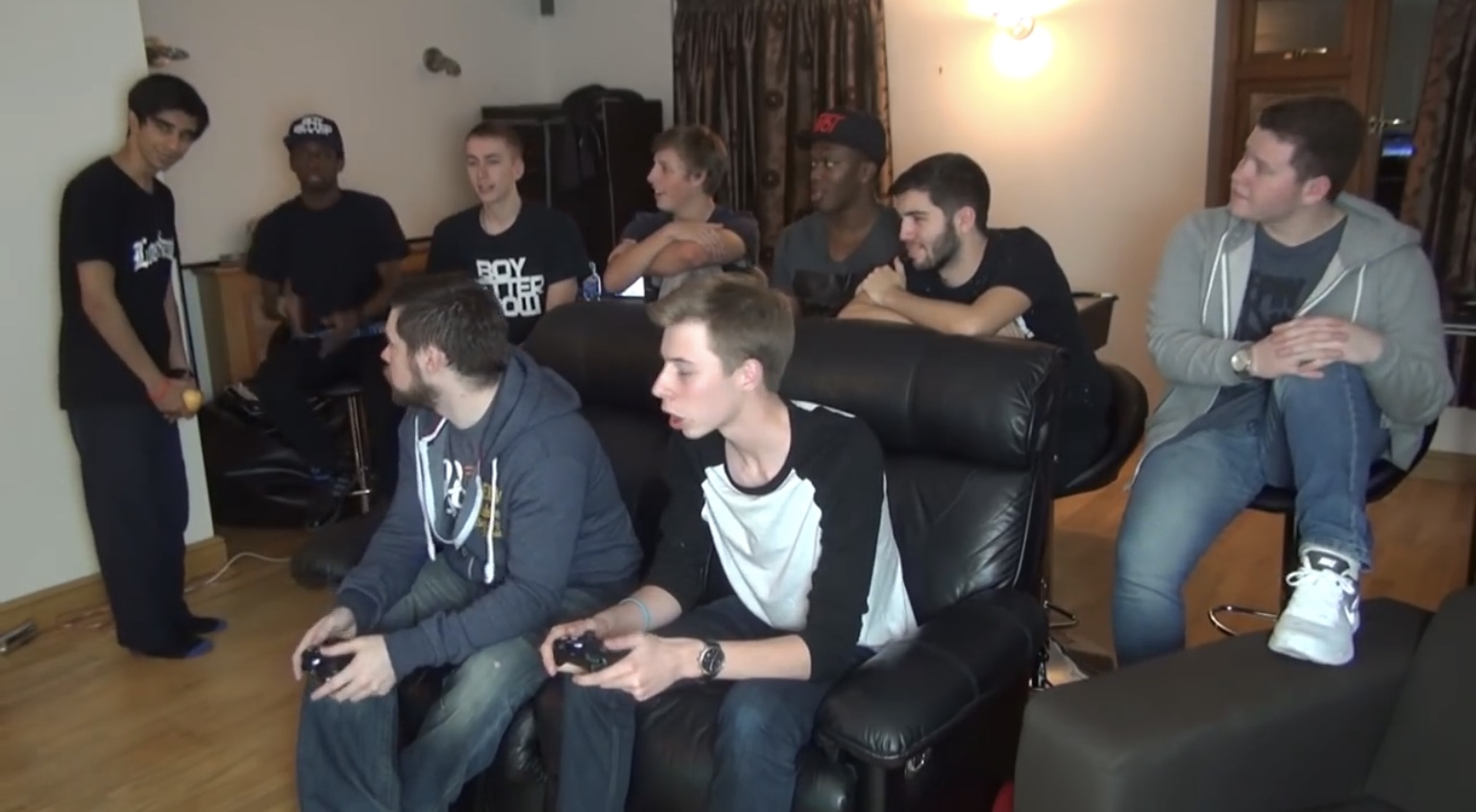
The Sidemen (background) and friends playing FIFA at the first "Sidemen House".

In February 2014, Olatunji, Minter, Bradley, and Barn moved into a house together near London, which they referred to as the "Sidemen House", which allowed them to collaborate more often.

In 2016, Olatunji, Minter, Bradley, and Barn moved into another "Sidemen House", living in a 15,000-square-foot, $8.5 million mansion in Bromley, London. In November 2016, the Sidemen collaborated with Rocket League to release an in-game SDMN FC community flag that users can get for free inside the game. The group's official YouTube channel, launched for the inaugural Sidemen Charity Match that year, became the fastest channel to reach one million subscribers.

On 1 December 2020, the group's eponymous YouTube channel surpassed 10 million subscribers. Each member of the group was awarded their own Diamond Play Button by YouTube to mark their milestone.

In March 2020, the Sidemen released a twenty-minute YouTube video titled "#StayHome". The video featured the Sidemen and more than one hundred other YouTube video creators and other celebrities raising awareness of the UK's "stay at home" campaign which aimed to reduce the spread of COVID-19 in the UK. All of the advertising revenue generated from the video was donated to the NHS.

=== 2021–present: Expanded content, continued growth, and Olatunji's departure ===
In August 2021, the Sidemen signed with a London-based digital talent management company called Arcade Media.

In April 2023, the Sidemen garnered controversy when Olatunji said the racial slur "Paki" in a Sidemen Sunday video published on 2 April; a parody of the British game show Countdown. The Sidemen group were criticised on Twitter after a clip of Olatunji speaking the slur went viral, including criticisms from DJ and presenter Bobby Friction and comedian Guz Khan among others. Hours later, Olatunji tweeted an apology for the slur and announced that he would be taking a break from social media. The Sidemen Twitter account also released a statement the following day apologising for the slur, with the statement reading, "We stand against racism and discrimination of any kind and we failed to do that." The full video in question has since been privatised. In an interview held before the 2023 Sidemen Charity Match, Barn told the BBC regarding the slur that the group had "very serious meetings" about the acceptability of what they joke about, saying, "We had to acknowledge that things are different to when we first all started platforms and the world has changed as a place. We saw it as a lesson and moved on from there and I think people were very understanding of that and allowed us to carry on doing what we're doing with a better sense of responsibility."

In July 2023, the group invested in The Fellas Studios, a production company founded by YouTubers Callum Airey and Joshua Larkin. On 3 July 2023, the group participated in a collaborative hide-and-seek challenge video with Paradise Wildlife Park, a Hertfordshire-based zoo. This initiative was part of a broader partnership aimed at supporting the zoo's conservation efforts. On 26 September 2023, the Sidemen signed with United Talent Agency, an American talent agency, for their representation in all areas of North America. On 17 August 2024, the group appeared and was ranked 21st on The Times's list of "The UK’s top 30 richest gamers and creators in 2024", estimating £50 million in fortune shared among the group.

On 31 May 2026, Olatunji announced that he would be departing the Sidemen, and that his last video with them would be that day. On 5 June, the Sidemen issued a joint statement confirming Olatunji's departure and wishing him the best. The group also stated that they had intended to release a coordinated farewell video, but Olatunji independently uploaded his own announcement without informing the other members.

== YouTube channels ==
The group has six YouTube channels, Sidemen, MoreSidemen, SidemenReacts, SidemenShorts, Side+, and EvenMoreSidemen, across which it publishes a variety of videos including challenges, sketches and video game commentaries.

As of May 2025, the Sidemen channel has over 22 million subscribers and 6.9 billion views, MoreSidemen has over 9 million subscribers and 5.2 billion views, SidemenReacts has over 5.7 million subscribers and 3.3 billion views, SidemenShorts has over 2.1 million subscribers and 1.9 billion views, and Side+ has over 377 thousand subscribers and 281 million views.

== Business ventures ==
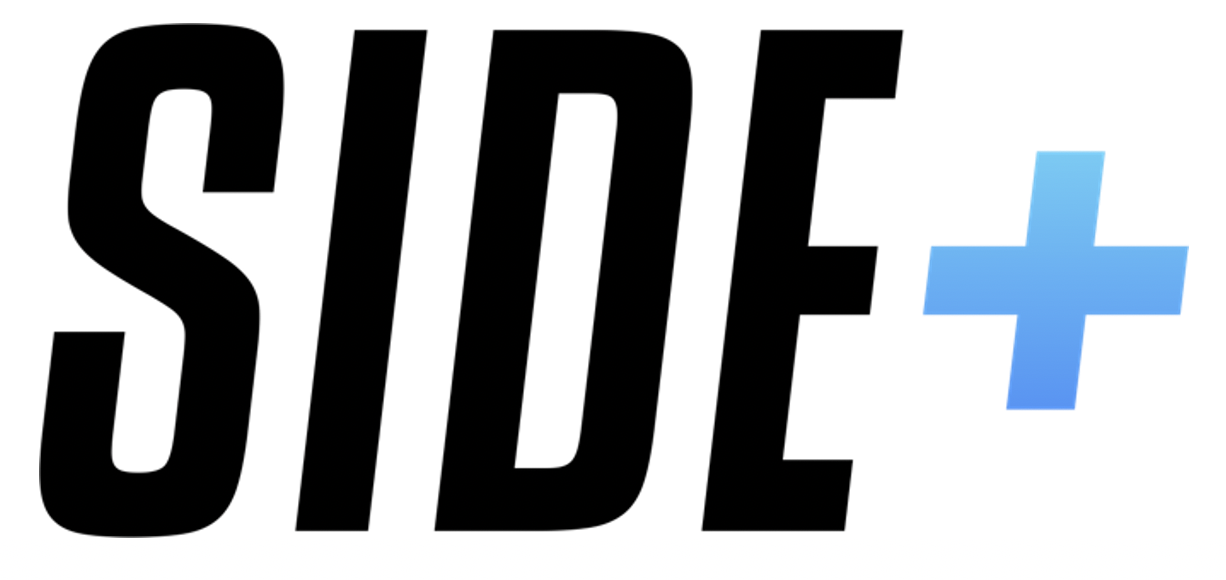
Side+

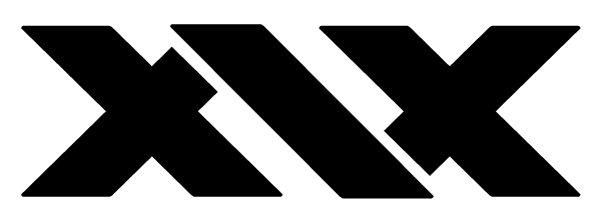
XIX Vodka

Since January 2026, Victor Bengtsson has been the CEO of Sidemen Entertainment.

=== Sidemen Clothing ===
Since 2014, the group has sold and distributed Sidemen Clothing merchandise. In October 2021, Sidemen Clothing collaborated with Ellesse, an Italian sportswear brand, and launched an AW21 collection of co-branded clothing. On 15 July 2023, they opened their first physical store in the Bluewater Shopping Centre in Kent. On 4 October 2024, they opened their second physical store in Bull Ring, Birmingham. However, the Bull Ring store closed in January 2026. The group also announced their partnership with Paramount to produce a Teenage Mutant Ninja Turtles-themed Sidemen apparel line.

=== Side+ ===
In September 2021, the Sidemen launched a subscription service app known as Side+, where they would post behind-the-scenes content from their YouTube video recordings and other extra contents. On 14 January 2022, they announced that the app is now available on Xbox.

=== Sides ===
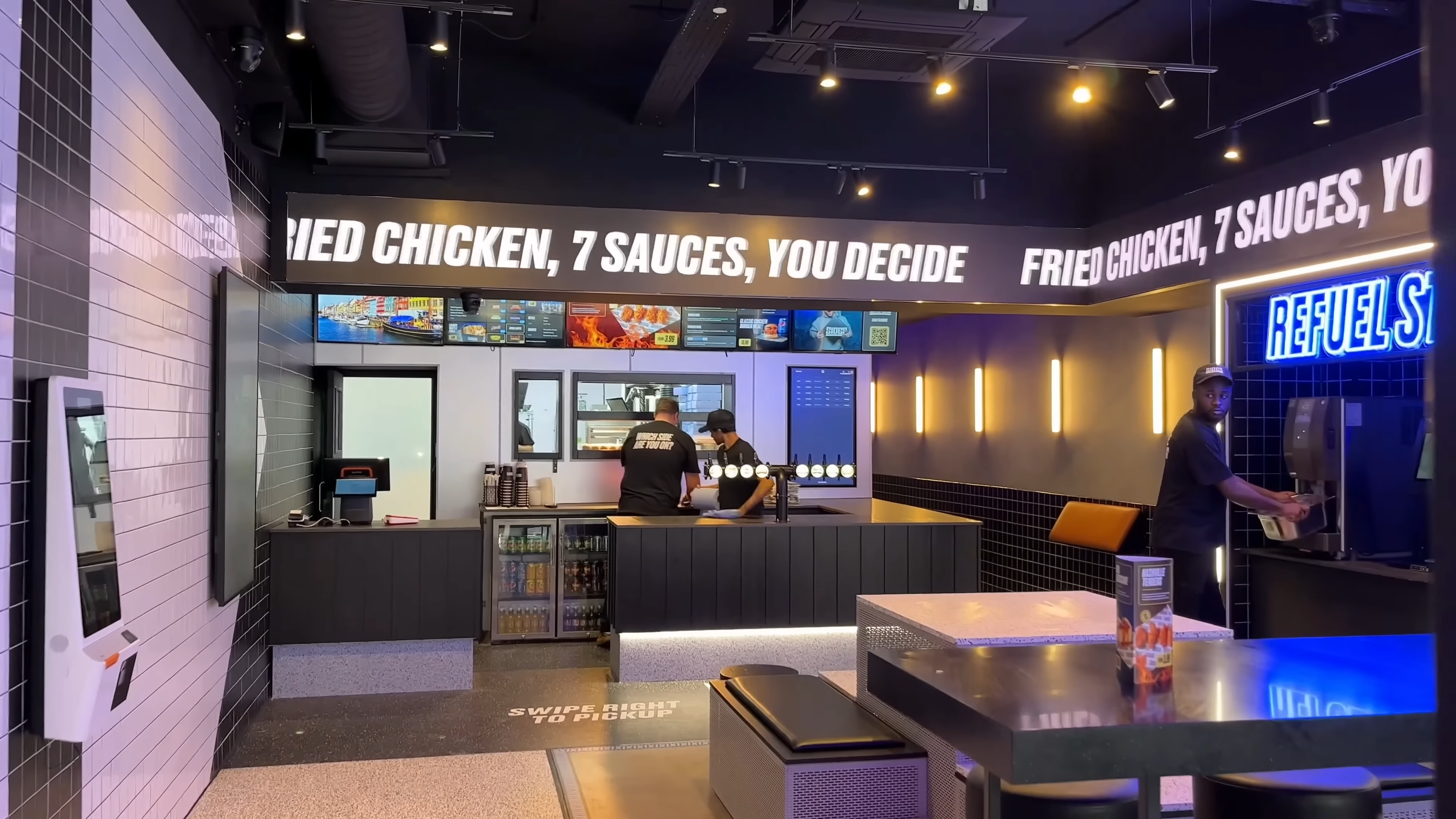
Sides restaurant in Dalston, East London.

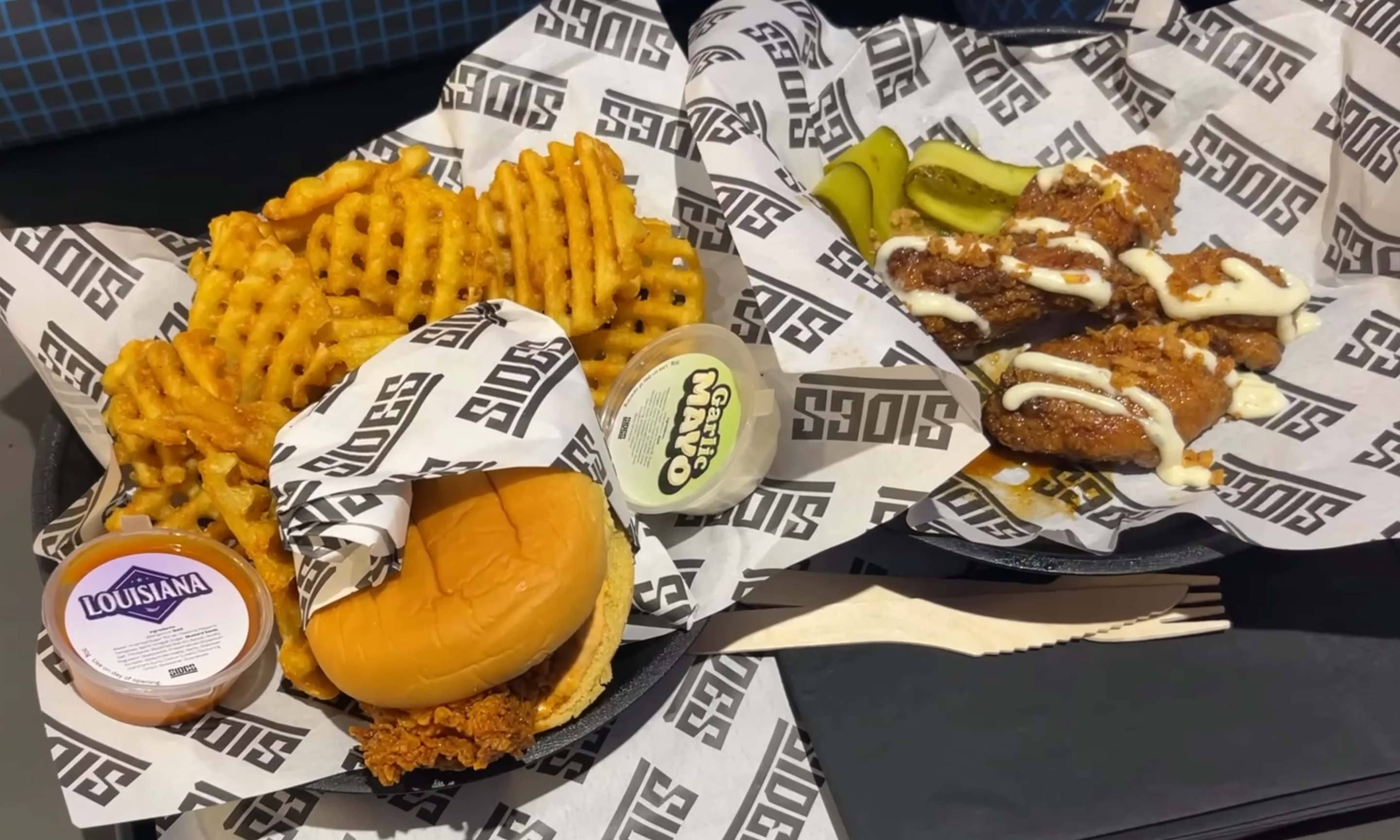
Example of the Sides menu: chicken burger, waffle fries, and wings with Tennessee sauce.

In November 2021, the Sidemen partnered with Reef, the world's largest operator of virtual restaurants and delivery kitchens, to launch a restaurant chain known as Sides. The restaurant is serving a menu of chicken and plant-based sandos, sliders, and salads that come in flavours including chipotle, classic buffalo, BBQ, Korean BBQ, teriyaki, garlic mayo, and Louisiana. Other dishes include mac and cheese bites, waffle fries, slaw, onion rings, and cheese poppers.

On 24 February 2022, the restaurant launched its first physical branch in Boxpark Wembley, attracting over three-hour queues on its debut day. As of September 2022, the restaurant had over 80 dark kitchens across the UK and 20 in the UAE. On 29 September 2022, the restaurant launched its second physical branch in Boxpark Croydon. In October 2022, the restaurant unveiled its new partnership with Farnham Town F.C., a semi-professional football club based in Farnham, Surrey, to become the football club’s front-shirt sponsor of the newly released 2022/23 away kit.

=== XIX Vodka ===
In 2022, the Sidemen founded and launched their own vodka brand known as XIX Vodka.

=== Best Cereal ===
In March 2024, the Sidemen and British oat producer Mornflake launched a cereal brand called Best Cereal. It debuted with two flavours, Choco Crunch and Caramel Gold.

=== Upside VC ===
In May 2025, the Sidemen and businessman Jamie Elliott announced they had co-founded venture capital firm Upside VC. The company is described as "backing consumer tech start-ups", with Sidemen member Bradley noting they were "looking mostly at tech" due to the "scale and speed" at which these projects can grow.

== Television series ==
=== The Sidemen Show ===
On 18 June 2018, the group released a web television series titled The Sidemen Show, available exclusively on YouTube Premium. It comprises seven 30-minute episodes filmed around the world alongside a number of celebrity guests.

=== Inside ===
In June 2024, the Sidemen released a reality competition series called Inside. The series features ten, or twelve, celebrity guests who compete in challenges to secure a prize fund totalled at £1 million, with everything they buy or do costing money from the prize fund. The series first aired on 2 June 2024 on their YouTube account, Sidemen, and last aired on 9 June 2024. In November, Netflix announced they had acquired the streaming rights for Inside, with a second serious confirmed for 2025. The second series premiered on 16 March 2025. The third series aired in March 2026.

==== Inside USA ====
In November 2024, Netflix announced a spin-off series called Inside USA, an American version of Sidemen's British reality series Inside. The first series premiered on 21 September 2025.

=== Outside ===
In August 2026, another spin-off series was announced, Outside. The series follows the same concept of Inside, but with the contestants staying in a forest for a week. The first series premiered on 28 September 2026 on Netflix.

=== Exit Strategy ===
In May 2026 the Sidemen debuted a reality gameshow called Exit Strategy. The series features 10 creators who are trapped in what the Sidemen call a "endless maze" where different rooms have unique challenges, twists or themes. The show aired on the Sidemen's second channel MoreSidemen.

=== Sidemen Presents: Side-Menu ===
In May 2026, the Sidemen announced a new reality cooking show called Sidemen Presents: Side-Menu. The series premiered on Amazon Prime Video on 26 May, then releasing on Sidemen's second channel MoreSidemen a week later.

== Other ventures ==
=== Book ===
On 18 October 2016, the group released a book titled Sidemen: The Book, published by Coronet Books, and embarked on a UK-wide promotional tour. A number one best-seller in the UK, the book sold 26,436 copies within the first three days of its release.

=== Documentary ===
On 14 February 2024, a documentary film about the Sidemen called The Sidemen Story was released on Netflix. The film was directed by Luke Hyams, a former Head of Originals for YouTube EMEA.

=== Bright Side charity ===
In 2023, the Sidemen founded grant-making charity Bright Side, seeking to "support charities and organisations that help people find and maintain a safe place to call home and help young people access the education, spaces and opportunities that every person deserves."

== Charity football matches ==
=== Wembley Cup ===
In August 2015, all of the Sidemen members except Olatunji and Barn participated in the 2015 Wembley Cup football charity match, facing Spencer FC, with Minter captaining the Sidemen United team. The match ended with Spencer FC beating Sidemen United by five goals to two.

=== Sidemen Charity Match ===
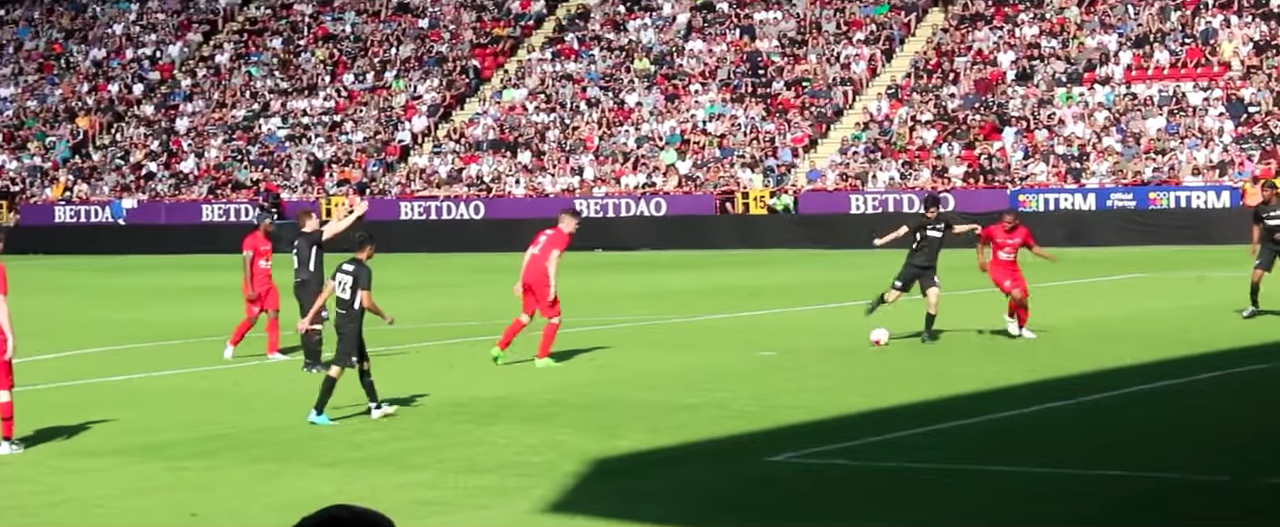
2018 Sidemen Charity Match at the Valley

The Sidemen Charity Match is a recurring football friendly match run by the Sidemen to raise money for various charitable causes. They have been held since 2016, barring a four-year hiatus between the third and fourth matches, and an eighteen month hiatus between the fifth and sixth matches. In the first six matches, the group's seven members and various affiliated YouTubers competed as the Sidemen Football Club, while various other YouTubers competed as the YouTube Allstars; for the seventh match in 2026, three of the Sidemen joined the YouTube Allstars. The first match, on 3 June 2016, was held at St Mary's Stadium, Southampton, raising over £110,000 for the Saints Foundation.

=== Eleven All Stars: France v. England ===
In May 2026, all of the Sidemen members participated in a charity football match organised by French YouTube personality AmineMaTue at the Parc des Princes in Paris. The match was set up as a France v England game, with the French side consisting of francophone social media personalities, and the English side consisting of UK social media personalities. The game ended in a 3–4 England defeat.

== Discography ==
List of singles with selected chart positions and year released
Title	Year	Peak chart positions					
Title	Year	UK	UK R&B	UK Ind.	IRE	NZ Hot	SCO
"The Gift" (featuring S-X)	2019	77	40	11	—	27	26
"This or That"	2022	—	—	23	—	14	—
"Christmas Drillings" (featuring Jme)	2022	3	—	2	25	7	—
"—" denotes a recording that did not chart or was not released in that territory.

== Publications ==
- The Sidemen (18 October 2016). Sidemen: The Book. Coronet Books. ISBN 978-1473648166.

== Awards and nominations ==
=== Awards ===
Award	Year	Category	Nominee(s)	Result	Ref.
British Book Awards	2017	Non-Fiction: Lifestyle Book of the Year	Sidemen: The Book	Nominated	
Shorty Awards	2019	Best YouTube Ensemble	Sidemen	Nominated	

=== World Records ===
Publication	Year	World record	Record holder	R. Status	Ref.
Guinness World Records	2022	Most viewers for a charity sports match live stream on YouTube	Sidemen	Record	
