= Bexley Grammar School =

Coordinates: 51.4564°N 0.1084°E

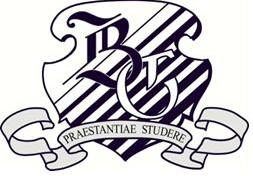

Location
- Danson Lane; Welling, London, DA16 2BL; England

Information
- Type: Grammar School; Academy
- Motto: Praestantiae Studere; Strive for Excellence
- Established: 1955; 71 years ago
- Local authority: Bexley
- Department for Education URN: 136369 Tables
- Ofsted: Reports
- Headmaster: Hugh Gilmore
- Gender: Mixed
- Age: 11 to 18
- Enrolment: 1935
- Houses: Collins; Johnson; Kirkman; Mabbs; Prothero; Wellman
- Former pupils: Old Bexleians
- Contact No: 020 8304 8538
- Website: http://www.bexleygs.co.uk/

Bexley Grammar School is a co-educational grammar school with academy status in Welling, in the London Borough of Bexley, UK. It takes boys and girls aged 11–18 who have passed the eleven plus exam.

== History ==
Bexley Grammar School was opened in 1955. In 1966, it was proposed that the school was merged with Westwood Secondary Modern School; Edward Heath, the MP for Bexley at the time, said that he had used his influence to stop this happening.

The school became an academy in January 2011.

== Academics ==
The school entrance examination is the eleven plus exam taken by prospective pupils in September of Year 6. Candidates who live in Bexleyheath must come in the top 120 and candidates who live in the wider catchment area (10 miles from the Broadway Shopping Centre, Bexleyheath) must come within the top 60. Students who apply to enter the school between the years 7 and 11 are required to pass examinations in English, Mathematics, Science, and a Modern Foreign Language.

To enter the Sixth Form students must achieve higher than GCSE grade C in all compulsory subjects and at least GCSE grade B in selected subjects. Current pupils must achieve more than six A*–Bs (including Maths and English) in their GCSEs to continue their studies in Sixth Form.

In the 2016 academic year, 100% of pupils attained 5 GCSE grades A* to C. 99.1% of the A-level grades were A* to D. The school began offering the International Baccalaureate (IB) in Sixth Form in 2003, alongside A Levels. From September 2017, students in the sixth form were only able to study the IB, as the school stopped teaching A Levels. In 2026, the school announced a switch back to A Levels due to cuts in government funding for the IB.

The school's last Ofsted inspection was in 2022; it was rated Outstanding in all areas.

== Premises ==
The school has expanded into new buildings over time; Main (M), Jubilee (J), Golden Jubilee (was the Danson building but was replaced in 2005 by the current building), Heath (H), Le Feuvre (L), Music (Mu), Jubilee extension (J) (2002–03) and Golden Jubilee (G). Some confusion can occur with the Jubilee extension, which was originally the G building and the 2005 extension of the Main building. Recently, the SEN block (S) has been added on the end of the school on the side of the PE block and a new sixth form centre has been built as an extension to the Le Feuvre building. In 2017, a further extension to the school added a (K) block with a Theatre and sixth form study area.

== Notable former pupils ==
- Stephanie Brind, professional squash player
- Daniel Francis, MP for Bexleyheath and Crayford.
- Gavin Peacock, former professional footballer
- Matthew Rose, former professional footballer
- Joshua Bradley and Tobi Brown, YouTubers and members of the Sidemen

== See also ==
- London Borough of Bexley
- Grammar schools in the United Kingdom
- List of schools in Bexley
