= Minter (surname) =

Minter is an English surname. Notable people with the surname include:

- Alan Minter (1951–2020), English boxer
- A. J. Minter (born 1993), American baseball player
- Anne Minter (born 1963), Australian tennis player
- Barry Minter (born 1970), American football player
- Billy Minter (1888–1940), English football player, trainer, and manager
- Billy M. Minter (1926–2005), United States Air Force general
- Cedric Minter (born 1958), Canadian football player
- Daniel Minter (born 1963), African American painter and sculptor
- DeMario Minter (born 1984), American football player
- Derek Minter (1932–2015), English motorcycle racer
- Elizabeth Minter (born 1965), Australian tennis player
- Frederick Minter (1887–1976), English civil engineer
- George Minter (1911–1966), English producer
- Kevin Minter (born 1990), American football player
- Louisiana Red (born Iverson Minter, 1932–2012), American blues guitarist, harmonica player, and singer
- Jeff Minter (born 1962), British computer programmer and video game author
- Jesse Minter (born 1983), American football coach
- Kristin Minter (born 1965), American actress
- Kelly Jo Minter (born 1966), American actress
- Kirby Minter (1929–2009), American basketball player
- Mary Miles Minter (1902–1984), American silent film actress
- Mike Minter (born 1974), American football player
- Patti Minter, American politician
- Rick Minter (born 1954), American football coach
- Sue Minter (born 1961), American politician
- Shannon Minter (born 1961), American attorney
- Simon Minter (born 1992), English YouTuber

Fictional characters:

- Rob Minter, in the BBC soap opera EastEnders
