= AboFlah =

Kuwaiti YouTuber and philanthropist

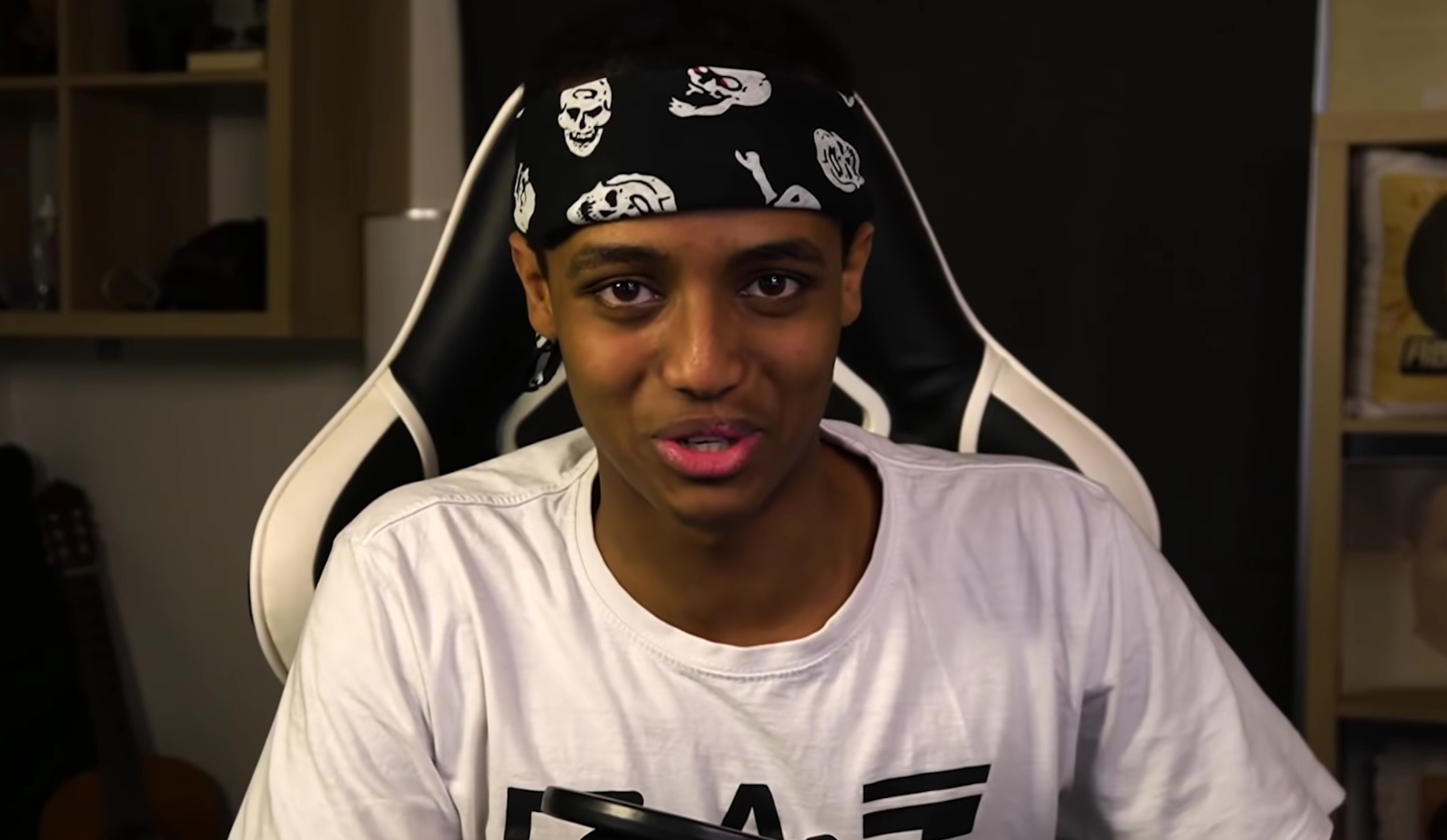
- AboFlah in 2020
- Born: Hassan Suleyman; December 18, 1998 (age 27); Kuwait City
- Occupations: YouTuber; gamer; philanthropist

YouTube information
- Channels: AboFlah; AboFlah Gaming
- Years active: 2016–present
- Genres: Gaming; entertainment
- Subscribers: 50.3 million (main channel); 5.68 million (second channel)
- Views: 8.75 billion (main channel); 560 million (second channel)
- Last updated: May 29, 2026

Hassan Suleyman (Arabic: حسن سليمان; born 18 December 1998), known online as AboFlah, is a Kuwaiti YouTuber, streamer and philanthropist He is best known for gaming-related content, challenge and entertainment videos, and large-scale charity livestreams that have received international media attention.

His channel has more than 50 million subscribers and more than 9 billion views, and it is the largest among the channels of Arab YouTubers in the field of video games and is among the fastest growing globally.

== Early life ==
Hassan Suleyman was born in Kuwait City, Kuwait on 18 December 1998. Regional profiles report that he is of Somali heritage and was raised in Kuwait; later he lived in the United Arab Emirates.

== Career ==
Suleyman launched his YouTube presence in 2016 under the name "GamesFlah", initially focusing on gameplay and edited "let’s play"-style videos. Over subsequent years his channel expanded into vlogs, reactions, variety entertainment and long-form livestreams; this content mix substantially increased his audience across the Arabic-speaking world. He later changed the channel name to "AboFlah". Suleyman stated that he chose the word "Flah" from the beginning because it is a Gulf word that means "Fun".

Despite Suleyman's success on YouTube, his father rejected his work. This happened after Suleyman reached half a million subscribers. The matter reached the point of his father threatening to boycott it as he considered YouTube "a space for demons". Suleyman's mother intervened to convince his father to allow Suleyman to continue his career as a YouTube content creator.

Suleyman achieved two records in the Guinness World Records, after he led a fundaising campaign through a live broadcast on YouTube, which had a goal of $10 million until it reached $11 million at the end of the broadcast, and ended the longest live stream until this period without interruption in his glass house, where he achieved the record for the longest continuous live broadcast duration in history, and the largest number of direct views in one moment for a humanitarian campaign via YouTube.

Suleyman has collaborated with regional esports organisations, appeared in broadcast interviews, and partnered with humanitarian actors for fundraising campaigns. Media coverage of his high-profile charity initiatives broadened his mainstream exposure beyond gaming audiences.

During the January 2022 Dubai campaign, Suleyman set two Guinness World Records: Longest live-stream (video) (268 hours, 14 minutes, 20 seconds) and Most viewers for a charity donation live stream on YouTube (peak concurrent viewers reported at 698,000). The Guinness coverage and campaign press releases reported the US$11 million raised for the Warm Winter initiative.

Suleyman has also been featured in regional lists and profiles including Forbes Middle East's '30 Under 30'.

== Personal life ==
Suleyman maintains a public persona through his social accounts and channels but keeps many private details out of the public record. Reports indicate he has lived in the UAE while retaining ties to Kuwait.

== Philanthropy ==
In October–November 2021, Suleyman conducted a rapid fundraiser that reportedly raised around US$1,000,000 in ~28 hours to support refugees in the region. That campaign received coverage from major Arabic outlets. In January 2022, Suleyman staged a high-profile charity livestream event in Dubai as part of the "World’s Coolest Winter / Warm Winter" initiative, living in a glass enclosure in Burj Park near the Burj Khalifa. Organised in partnership with The Mohammed bin Rashid Al Maktoum Global Initiatives, the campaign reportedly raised about US$11 million for refugee relief and winter assistance; the campaign and livestream were widely reported and later noted by Guinness World Records.

Reports credit his campaigns with funding medical procedures (including cataract surgeries), providing housing and winter supplies for displaced families, and organising giveaways to fans as part of promotional drives.

On 14 February 2025, Suleyman hosted the second addition of the "Match for Hope" football series in Doha, Qatar. He co-captain a team alongside KSI facing off against team Chunkz & IShowSpeed. The match ended with Team AboFlah & KSI's 6-5 victory over Team Chunkz & IShowSpeed. The event managed to raise more than $10.7 million for charity.

== Awards and nominations ==
=== World Records ===
Publication	Year	World record	Record holder	R. Status	Ref.
Guinness World Records	2022	Longest live-stream (video)	Himself	Record	
Guinness World Records	2022	Most viewers for a charity donation live stream on YouTube	Himself	Record	

=== Listicles ===
Publisher	Year	Listicle	Result	Ref.
Forbes	2022	30 Under 30: Entertainment (Middle East)	Featured Honoree	
