= KSI: In Real Life =

2023 British documentary film

- Directed by: Wesley Pollitt
- Produced by: Sophie Grant
- Starring: KSI
- Music by: KSI; Gary Welch
- Production company: Mindhouse Productions
- Distributed by: Amazon Prime Video
- Release date: 26 January 2023
- Running time: 90 minutes

KSI: In Real Life is a 2023 British documentary film produced by Amazon Prime Video, that focuses on the life and career of KSI, an English YouTuber, musician and professional boxer.

The documentary released on 26 January 2023, and is directed by Wesley Pollitt. and also proceeds to show KSI's life and his music career and behind the scenes of him recording songs and videos.

== Development ==
In September 2021, KSI announced via Twitter that he was releasing a documentary on Amazon Prime Video, and that Louis Theroux will be an executive producer.

On 19 May 2022, KSI and Theroux attended an Amazon Prime showcase event where the two spoke about the documentary. During the event, it was revealed that the documentary would release in November 2022 however, no exact release date nor title was revealed at the event.

On 6 October, in an interview with the Rolling Stone UK Magazine, KSI revealed that the documentary will release in early 2023 confirming that the documentary had been delayed from its initial release window. On 17 December, KSI revealed in a YouTube video that the documentary will release in January 2023.

== Plot ==
The documentary captures a look at a year in the life of KSI, including him performing at Reading & Leeds Festival, recording his upcoming third album, his relationships with his family and his girlfriend, following him and his brother Deji's boxing careers, and his UK tour, culminating in a concert at Wembley Arena.

== Release ==
In December 2022, Amazon Prime Video announced that KSI: In Real Life would be released on 26 January 2023.
