= Mornflake =

British oat breakfast cereal brand

- Industry: Food
- Founded: Cheshire, England (1941)
- Founder: Philip Lea
- Headquarters: Crewe, England
- Number of locations: 2 production sites
- Key people: John Lea – owner
- Products: Breakfast cereal, oats
- Website: www.mornflake.com

Mornflake is a British brand of oat and oat-based breakfast cereals, launched in 1941 in Crewe, Cheshire, by parent company H J Lea Oakes.

== History ==
The Mornflake brand was first launched in 1941 by the Lea family at the height of World War II. The family had an existing oat milling business in the Cheshire village of Swettenham dating back to 1675 and the current managing director, John Lea, is a direct descendant of the original founder. H J Lea Oakes, the parent company of Morning Foods, is one of the oldest companies in the UK and is one of Crewe's larger employers alongside Bentley Motors.

Mornflake Oats was the official shirt sponsor of football teams Crewe Alexandra F.C. and Altrincham F.C. The Mornflake logo appeared on Crewe shirts for 20 years from 2005, making it the then longest continual agreement in the EFL, and October 2024 saw the 1,000th game since Mornflake's shirt sponsorship began. In June 2021, Crewe agreed a £500,000 naming rights deal with Mornflake; its Gresty Road ground would be called the "Mornflake Stadium" until at least 2024–25. In April 2025, Mornflake extended their ground naming rights sponsorship, while shirt sponsorship was taken over by Whitby Morrison.

== Products ==
The Mornflake product range includes porridge oats, oat bran, oatmeal, muesli, granola and other breakfast cereals.
