= Baller League UK – Season 1 =

First season of the Baller League UK

Baller League UK
- Season: 1
- Dates: 24 March 2025 – 12 June 2025
- Champions: SDS FC
- Matches: 69
- Top goalscorer: Bryan Ly (N5 FC); 21 goals
- Highest scoring: 26ers 8–9 Trebol FC (2 June 2025)

Baller League UK – Season 1 was the first season of the British version of the Baller League, an indoor six-a-side football competition that originated in Germany in 2024, created by entrepreneur Felix Starck, with backing from professional footballers Mats Hummels and Lukas Podolski. Following the German edition's success, major expansions were announced in November 2024, with the UK edition launched in March 2025. SDS FC defeated MVPs United 4–3 in the final, which was held at The O2 Arena, London, to become the first ever Baller League UK champion.

== Summary ==
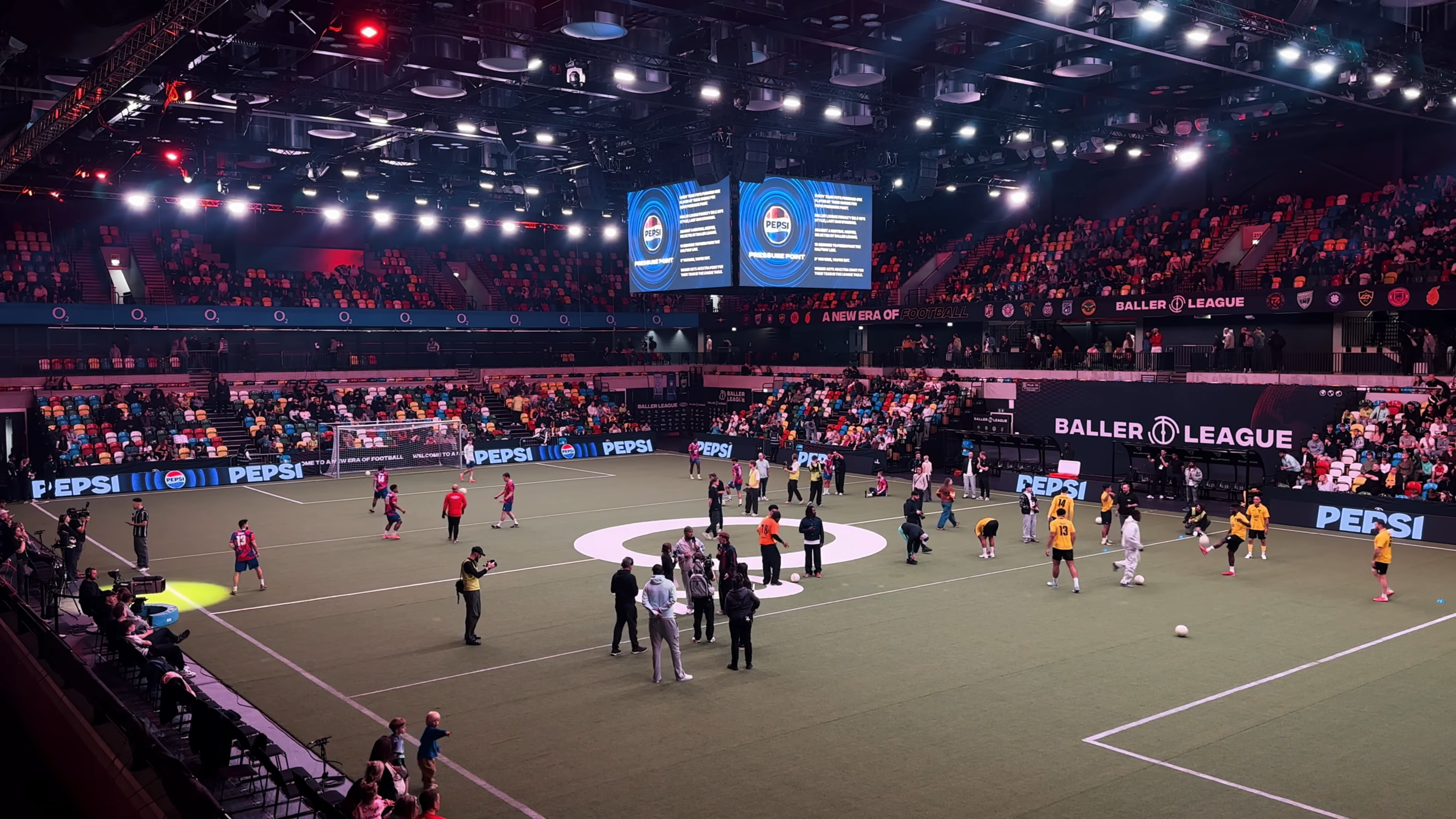
Season 1 matchday at London's Copper Box Arena in May 2025.

Before the season started, each manager chose players on draft day on 10 March 2025. The regular season started on 24 March 2025 with each match held at London's Copper Box Arena. The final four matches were played on 12 June 2025 at The O2 Arena, London with SDS FC as the winner of the season 1 after defeating MVPs United in the final by 4–3, with Deportrio and Yanited each becoming the semi-finalists.

=== Broadcasting and hosts ===
Sky Sports and NOW TV have secured a one-year broadcast partnership for the UK edition, ensuring live coverage of all matches, with every games shown on Sky Sports Mix. International viewers can also watch via the Baller League's YouTube and Twitch channels every matchday. Every match was hosted by YouTuber Chunkz and Olivia Buzaglo.

=== Guests ===
In matchday two on 31 March 2025, Tottenham Hotspur defender Kevin Danso, appeared as a pitchside co-commentator. On 12 June 2025, at the final four matchday, Will Smith appeared to introduce the teams ahead of the Legends vs Creators match.

== Teams and managers ==
The league includes 12 teams, each managed by a notable figure from sports, entertainment, and social media. The teams and managers for the first season are as follows:

Team	Manager(s)
26ers	(England) John Terry
Deportrio	(England) Alan Shearer, (England) Gary Lineker, and (England) Micah Richards
FC Rules the World	(England) Clint 419
M7 FC	(England) Miniminter
MVPs United	(Switzerland) Alisha Lehmann and (England) Maya Jama
N5 FC	(Germany) Jens Lehmann, (France) Robert Pirès, and (Sweden) Freddie Ljungberg
Santan FC	(England) Dave
SDS FC	(England) Sharky
Trebol FC	(Portugal) Luís Figo
VZN FC	(England) TBJZL
Wembley Rangers AFC	(England) Ian Wright and (England) Chloe Kelly
Yanited	(England) Angryginge

== Notable players ==
The league features a mix of former professionals and emerging talents. Notable players include:

- Henri Lansbury
- Marvin Sordell
- Jordon Ibe
- Ciaran Clark
- Montel McKenzie
- Jerome Sinclair
- Josh Harrop
- Navid Nasseri
- Michael Ndiweni
- Adrian Mariappa
- Sak Hassan
- Troy Deeney
- Kazaiah Sterling

== League table ==
Pos	Team	Pld	W	D	L	GF	GA	GD	BP	Pts	Qualification
1	Deportrio	11	7	1	3	42	37	+5	1	23	Advance to Final Four
2	MVPs United	11	7	1	3	44	40	+4	1	23	Advance to Final Four
3	Yanited	11	7	1	3	51	34	+17	0	22	Advance to Final Four
4	SDS FC	11	6	1	4	49	37	+12	1	20	Advance to Final Four
5	Trebol FC	11	6	2	3	53	44	+9	0	20	
6	Santan FC	11	6	1	4	43	41	+2	0	19	
7	VZN FC	11	4	3	4	42	50	−8	4	19	
8	M7 FC	11	4	2	5	41	42	−1	0	14	
9	26ers	11	3	3	5	53	53	0	1	13	
10	Wembley Rangers AFC	11	3	2	6	38	44	−6	0	11	
11	FC Rules the World	11	2	2	7	35	50	−15	2	10	
12	N5 FC	11	1	1	9	37	56	−19	1	5	

Source: Baller League UK

== Results ==
	26S	DPT	RTW	M7F	MVP	N5F	SFC	SDS	TFC	VZN	WRS	YTD
26ers		5:7	3:3	5:5	4:1	6:5	4:5	2:5	8:9	8:3	3:3	5:7
Deportrio	7:5		3:2	4:3	4:0	7:3	2:7	3:8	2:2	6:3	4:1	0:3
FC Rules the World	3:3	2:3		5:9	4:5	4:2	3:4	1:4	1:5	5:5	4:3	3:7
M7 FC	5:5	3:4	9:5		2:3	3:1	1:4	3:6	5:4	5:5	3:2	2:3
MVPs United	1:4	0:4	5:4	3:2		3:3	7:3	6:4	7:5	4:6	4:2	4:3
N5 FC	5:6	3:7	2:4	1:3	3:3		4:3	5:6	2:5	6:7	4:5	2:7
Santan FC	5:4	7:2	4:3	4:1	3:7	3:4		4:3	6:4	1:1	2:6	4:6
SDS FC	5:2	8:3	4:1	6:3	4:6	6:5	3:4		3:5	2:4	6:2	2:2
Trebol FC	9:8	2:2	5:1	4:5	5:7	5:2	4:6	5:3		5:3	5:5	4:2
VZN FC	3:8	3:6	5:5	5:5	6:4	7:6	1:1	4:2	3:5		4:2	1:6
Wembley Rangers AFC	3:3	1:4	3:4	2:3	2:4	5:4	6:2	2:6	5:5	2:4		7:5
Yanited	7:5	3:0	7:3	3:2	3:4	7:2	6:4	2:2	2:4	6:1	5:7	

=== Final Four ===
The Final Four matches were held on 12 June 2025.

Semifinals			Finals
1	Deportrio	2
4	SDS FC	3	4	SDS FC	4
2	MVPs United	5	2	MVPs United	3
3	Yanited	1

==== Semi-finals ====
12 June 2025

Deportrio	2–3	SDS FC
Sako 4' 16'	Report	Brown 5'; Sterling 27'; Andrade 29'

The O2 Arena, London
Attendance: 20,000
12 June 2025

MVPs United	5–1	Yanited
Abraham 12' 14'; Maieco 15'; Matthews 27' 28'	Report	De-Graft 16'

The O2 Arena, London
Attendance: 20,000

==== Final ====
12 June 2025

SDS FC	4–3	MVPs United
Folivi 1'; Castanho 4'; Sterling 8'; Restrepo 13'	Report	Maieco 10' 18' 29'

The O2 Arena, London
Attendance: 20,000
