= Sharky (internet personality) =

English social media personality (born 1995)

- Born: Sharmarke Mohamud; 31 December 1995 (age 30); Utrecht, Netherlands
- Occupation: Social media personality
- Years active: 2015–present

Instagram information
- Page: Sharky
- Followers: 1.4 million

TikTok information
- Page: sharky
- Followers: 2.2 million

YouTube information
- Channel: Sharky
- Genres: Entertainment; vlog; football; gaming; pranks
- Subscribers: 1.51 million
- Views: 97 million

Sharmarke Mohamud (born 31 December 1995), better known as Sharky, is a Dutch-British social media personality. After launching his YouTube account in 2015, with videos consisting mainly of vlog, football and gaming videos, he joined the YouTube group Beta Squad alongside five other creators on the platform, amassing over 12 million subscribers. In 2026, he appeared as a contestant on the twenty-sixth series of I'm a Celebrity...Get Me Out of Here!.

== Life and career ==
Sharky was born Shamarke Mohamud in Utrecht, Netherlands, on 31 December 1995 to Somali parents and is the oldest of seven siblings. He later relocated to England and attended Oasis Academy Enfield and Harrow High School, before studying BTEC Level 3 Sport Science at Barnet and Southgate College and taking part in a development squad for Tottenham Hotspur F.C.. He previously worked as a steward at the Emirates Stadium, the home of the football club Arsenal F.C., which he supports, and in 2015, launched his YouTube channel under the name "Afcsharky", in reference to the club. He went on to upload various videos relating to football, as well as gaming and challenge videos.

In 2019, Sharky joined the Beta Squad, a British YouTube collective group, along with fellow YouTubers Chunkz, Niko Omilana, AJ Shabeel and King Kenny. In February of that year, the group lived together in a mansion in London, where they created daily content across social media platforms. The group operate a shared channel titled "Beta Squad", where they upload collaborative content and have amassed over 12 million subscribers. In 2020, he launched a podcast SDS, an acronym of "Sharky Does Sports", in which he chats with various guests about primarily football topics.

In 2023, Sharky appeared on an episode of the online series Get in the Van on Channel 4's online digital channel, Channel 4.0. The series follows teams of influencers using social media to scout the most suitable person to "get in the van" in an array of categories going head-to-head against hosts Spuddz and America Foster. Sharky, alongside Madame Joyce, had to find someone with the hairiest chest. He also manages SDS FC, an indoor six-a-side football team in the Baller League. The team won the inaugural UK league in June 2025. In November 2026, Sharky appeared as a contestant on the twenty-sixth series of I'm a Celebrity...Get Me Out of Here!.

== Filmography ==
As himself
Year	Title	Notes	Ref.
2023	Get in the Van	Guest; 1 episode	
2026	I'm a Celebrity...Get Me Out of Here!	Contestant; series 26	
