= AJ Odudu =

British television presenter (born 1988)

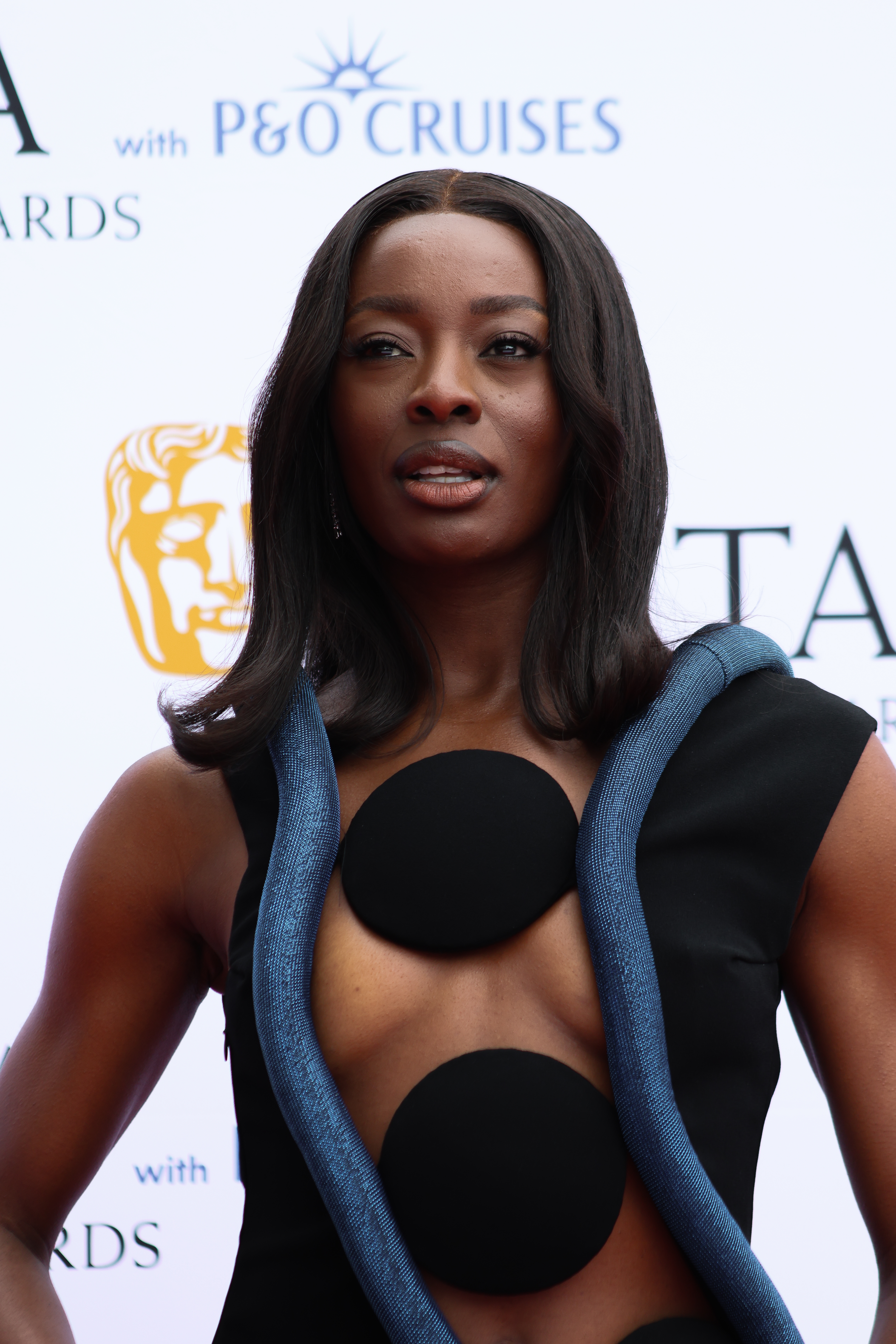
- Odudu in 2026
- Born: Onatejiro Odudu; 12 February 1988 (age 38); Blackburn, Lancashire, England
- Education: Keele University
- Occupation: Television presenter
- Years active: 2009–present
- Employer(s): ITV; Channel 4

Onatejiro "AJ" Odudu (born 12 February 1988) is a British television presenter. She co-presents the ITV2 reality shows Big Brother (since 2023) and Celebrity Big Brother (since 2024) alongside Will Best, and previously the spin-off show Big Brother's Bit on the Side (2013). In 2021, she presented the Channel 4 reality show spin-off Married at First Sight: Afters. It was announced that she will appear on the 26th season of ITV1's I'm a Celebrity...Get Me Out of Here!.

== Early life and education ==
Onatejiro Odudu was born on 12 February 1988 in Blackburn, Lancashire, England. Her mother, Florence, and father, James, are Nigerian and she is one of eight children (five boys and three girls). Her parents had an arranged marriage, for which her mother emigrated to the United Kingdom from Nigeria in the 1970s. Her father worked as a bus conductor, and her mother worked as a seamstress, cleaner, and dinner lady at a private school.

Odudu attended St Bede's RC High School and St Mary's College in Blackburn. In 2009 she graduated with a degree in English and politics from Keele University.

== Career ==
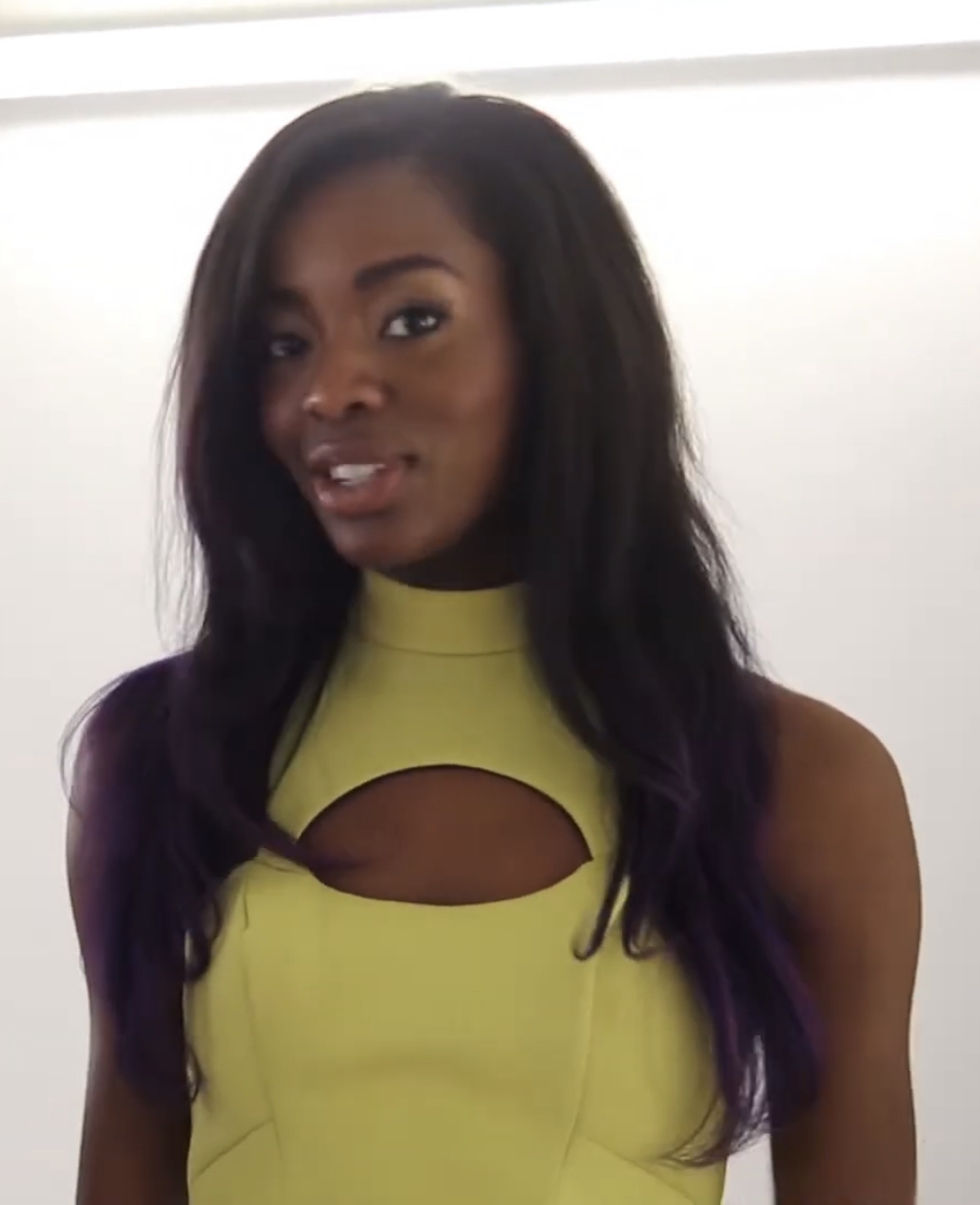
Odudu in 2015

Odudu began her career as a reporter for BBC Blast based at Radio Lancashire. Her first presenting roles began in 2009 on the BBC Two series The Almost Perfect Guide to Life and on The 5:19 Show, an online show on the BBC website, having previously served as the latter's 'raving reporter'. In 2010, she was a guest on 100 Greatest Toys, a one-off special broadcast on Channel 4. She starred as herself in Comedy Lab in 2011 and co-presented Sky Arts' coverage of the Isle of Wight Festival 2012.

In June 2013, Odudu began presenting Big Brother's Bit on the Side with Rylan Clark and Emma Willis, and then Celebrity Big Brother's Bit on the Psych from August 2013. Her departure from the show was confirmed in November 2013, being replaced by Celebrity Big Brother 12 contestant and former Loose Women panellist, Carol McGiffin. In August 2013, Odudu launched her own blog on Hello magazine's UK website. From 2015 to 2019, Odudu hosted the 4Music programme Trending Live!, with Jimmy Hill and Vick Hope.

She regularly presented the online Facebook quiz game "Confetti" in March and April 2019.

In July 2021, she won the second series of Celebrity Karaoke Club on ITV2. Also in that month, Odudu was confirmed as co-host of a one-off revival edition of The Big Breakfast, presenting alongside the already-announced Mo Gilligan, for Channel 4 in September 2021.

In September 2021, Odudu began hosting the Channel 4 reality show spin-off Married at First Sight: Afters (later retitled Married at First Sight: Unveiled). The following year, she hosted the second series of the reality competition show 'The Bridge: Race to a Fortune for Channel 4 and HBO Max.. The following year, she hosted the second series of the reality competition show The Bridge: Race to a Fortune for Channel 4 and HBO Max.

In March 2022, she co-hosted The Great Comic Relief Prizeathon alongside Vernon Kay.

Odudu presented the UK jury points in the Eurovision Song Contest 2022. In June 2022, she was a presenter for the BBC's coverage of the Platinum Jubilee Pageant. On 10 January 2023, it was announced that Odudu would co-host the official handover and semi-final allocation draw for the Eurovision Song Contest 2023 that will be broadcast live on BBC Two.

Throughout late 2022 and 2023, Odudu expanded her hosting portfolio with several specialized competition and reality formats. She fronted the E4 hairdressing competition The Big Blow Out (2022), presented the property renovation series The Big Interiors Battle (2023) on Channel 4, and hosted the factual entertainment series The Greatest Auction (2023) for the same network.

In April 2023, it was announced that Odudu would be hosting the revival of Big Brother on ITV, alongside Will Best. Odudu and Best have also presented the spin-off Celebrity Big Brother since its revival in 2024.. The duo continued at the helm of the franchise through its subsequent 2025 iterations, including the second series of Celebrity Big Brother in April 2025 and the third main series in September 2025. In March 2025, she co-hosted the main live telethon for Comic Relief on BBC One alongside Vernon Kay and Paddy McGuinness. Later that year, she re-teamed with Kay to co-present the ITV design competition series M&S: Dress the Nation

=== Strictly Come Dancing ===
From September 2021, she was a competitor on the nineteenth series of Strictly Come Dancing, partnered with professional dancer Kai Widdrington. They topped the leaderboard in their first week with a score of 34, and again in week 7, when they scored 39 for their Charleston to "Don't Bring Lulu". The couple also jointly topped the leaderboard in the semi-final, but were forced to withdraw from the competition on 17 December, the day before the final, after Odudu tore a ligament in her right ankle.

=== I’m a Celebrity Get Me Out of Here ===
On 11 November 2026, AJ was announced as one of the 11 contestants appearing on Series 26 of I'm a Celebrity...Get Me Out of Here. Following an elimination trial with fellow campmate Claire Sweeney on the first day, AJ became the first celebrity to be eliminated, having never made it to the camp. But on the second episode it was announced she was coming back and wasn’t “as it seemed”.

== Personal life ==
As of 2021 Odudu lives in London. She is a qualified personal trainer and sports nutritionist, and runs in her spare time.

In June 2025, she announced her engagement on Instagram.

== Filmography ==
| Year | Title | Role | Ref. |
|---|---|---|---|
| 2009 | The Almost Perfect Guide to Life | Co-presenter | |
| 2009 | The 5:19 Show | Co-presenter | |
| 2010 | Teensville: Teen Witches | Presenter | |
| 2011 | Dirty Digest | Panellist | |
| 2011 | Comedy Lab | Herself | |
| 2012 | Isle of Wight Festival 2012 | Co-presenter | |
| 2013 | Big Brother's Bit on the Side | Co-presenter | |
| 2013 | Celebrity Big Brother's Bit on the Side | Co-presenter | |
| 2015–2016 | The Hot Desk | Presenter | |
| 2018 | Manhunting with My Mum | Presenter | |
| 2019 | The Voice UK | Backstage presenter | |
| 2019 | The Voice Kids | Backstage presenter | |
| 2019 | Celebrity SAS: Who Dares Wins | Contestant | |
| 2020 | The Great British Bake Off: An Extra Slice | Series 4; Episode 1 – Herself | |
| 2020 | Richard Osman's House of Games | Series 4; Episodes 16–20 – Herself | |
| 2020 | Don't Rock the Boat | Co-presenter | |
| 2021 | Would I Lie to You? | Herself | |
| 2021 | Celebrity Karaoke Club | Winner | |
| 2021 | The Wheel | Expert | |
| 2021 | Cooking with the Stars | Contestant | |
| 2021 | Rolling In It | Contestant | |
| 2021 | Apocalypse Wow | Presenter | |
| 2021 | The Big Breakfast | Co-presenter | |
| 2021 | Strictly Come Dancing | Series 19; Finalist | |
| 2021 | Married at First Sight UK: Afters | Presenter | |
| 2021 | Emma and AJ Get to Work | Co-presenter; alongside Emma Willis | |
| 2022 | The Great Comic Relief Prizeathon | Co-presenter; alongside Vernon Kay | |
| 2022 | Eurovision Song Contest 2022 | Spokesperson for the UK's votes | |
| 2022 | The Bridge: Race to a Fortune | Presenter | |
| 2022 | Platinum Jubilee Pageant | Presenter | |
| 2022 | Rosie Jones' Trip Hazard | Herself | |
| 2022 | Red Bull Soapbox Race: London 2022 | Co-presenter; alongside Will Best | |
| 2022 | The Hit List | Contestant | |
| 2022 | RuPaul's Drag Race UK | Special guest; Series 4 | |
| 2022 | The Last Leg: Christmas Bash | Special guest | |
| 2022 | The Weakest Link | Contestant | |
| 2022 | The Big Blow Out | Host | |
| 2023 | The Big Interiors Battle | Presenter | |
| 2023 | Time For a Check In | Presenter | |
| 2023 | Eurovision Song Contest 2023: Handover and Allocation Draw | Co-host; alongside Rylan Clark | |
| 2023 | Pointless Celebrities | Contestant | |
| 2023 | The Great Stand Up to Cancer Bake Off | Herself | |
| 2023 | The Greatest Auction | Host | |
| 2023 | Shopping with Keith Lemon | Herself; one episode | |
| 2023 | Mary Makes It Easy | Guest | |
| 2023–present | Big Brother | Co-presenter; alongside Will Best | |
| 2023–2025 | Big Brother: Late & Live | Co-presenter; alongside Will Best | |
| 2024 | RuPaul's Drag Race UK | Guest judge; Series 6, Episode 8: "All in the Drag Family" | |
| 2024–2025 | M&S: Dress the Nation | Co-presenter; alongside Vernon Kay | |
| 2024–2025 | Celebrity Big Brother: Late & Live | Co-presenter; alongside Will Best | |
| 2024- | Celebrity Big Brother | Co-presenter; alongside Will Best | |
| 2024- | Dodge’s pup school | Pigeon | |
| 2025 | The Celebrity Apprentice: Christmas Specials | Herself / Contestant | |
| 2026 | Gladiators: Celebrity Special | Herself / Contestant | |
| 2026 | I'm a Celebrity...Get Me Out of Here! | Herself / Contestant | |
