= Jack Skipper =

English stand-up comedian (born 1988)

- Born: May 1988 (age 38); Sutton, London, England
- Occupations: Stand-up comedian; social media personality; actor
- Children: 2

Comedy career
- Medium: Stand-up; television; podcasts

Jack Laurence Skipper (born May 1988) is an English stand-up comedian, social media personality and actor. After beginning his career as a carpet fitter, he went on to embark on comedy and has fronted the tours Skint (2024–2026) and Nothing Heavy (2027). He has also made appearances on The Stand Up Sketch Show, Live at the Apollo and appears as a contestant on the twenty-sixth series of I'm a Celebrity...Get Me Out of Here! (2026).

== Life and career ==
Jack Laurence Skipper was born in May 1988 in Sutton, London. He left school with no qualifications and subsequently became a carpet fitter, describing himself as the "14th best carpet fitter in the Croydon area. He embarked on a stand-up comedy course in February 2020 prior to the COVID-19 pandemic, and subsequently began pursuing comedy full time, as well as posting on TikTok and Instagram. He was runner-up in the So You Think You're Funny? competition in 2022, reached the final of the Komedia New Act competition in 2023 and won Best Debut Show at the Leicester Comedy Festival Awards in 2024. Skipper hosted a podcast Get to the Good Stuff with Jack Skipper from 2022 to 2024. Between 2023 and 2024, he made various appearances on the ITV2 series The Stand Up Sketch Show.

Between 2024 and 2026, Skipper performed his debut stand-up tour Skint, which he also performed at the Edinburgh Festival Fringe. In January 2026, he made his debut appearance on Live at the Apollo. The same year, he appeared in an episode of the Apple TV series Trying and will be a contestant on the twenty-sixth series of I'm a Celebrity...Get Me Out of Here!. In 2027, he will embark on the tour Nothing Heavy and will appear in the film Zak the Ripper.

== Filmography ==
Year	Title	Role	Notes
2023–2024	The Stand Up Sketch Show	Himself	Performer; 5 episodes
2025	Silence is Golden	Himself	Participant
2026	Live at the Apollo	Himself	Performer
2026	I'm a Celebrity...Get Me Out of Here!	Himself	Contestant; series 26
2026	Trying	Kyle	Episode: "Halloween"
2027	Zak the Ripper	Dave	Film role

== Stand-up tours ==
- Skint (2025–2026)
- Nothing Heavy (2027)

== Podcasts ==
- Get to the Good Stuff with Jack Skipper (2022–2024)
