= I'm a Celebrity...Get Me Out of Here! (British TV series) series 26 =

Twenty-sixth series of I'm a Celebrity...Get Me Out of Here!

I'm a Celebrity...Get Me Out of Here!
- Series 26
- Presented by: Anthony McPartlin; Declan Donnelly
- No. of days: 22
- No. of castaways: 12
- Location: Murwillumbah, New South Wales, Australia
- Companion show: I'm a Celebrity: Unpacked
- No. of episodes: 3

Release
- Original network: ITV
- Original release: 16 November 2026 – present

Series chronology
- ← Previous; Series 25

I'm a Celebrity...Get Me Out of Here! returned for its twenty-sixth series on 16 November 2026 on ITV, and will again be filmed in Murwillumbah, New South Wales with Ant & Dec returning to present the series. Sam Thompson and Kemi Rodgers will return to front the spin-off show I'm a Celebrity: Unpacked as a duo, following Joel Dommett's departure.

== Production ==
Following the conclusion of the previous series, ITV confirmed that the show would return for a twenty-sixth series in November 2026, with Ant & Dec returning to host. In July 2026, it was announced that Joel Dommett would be departing his role of hosting the spin-off show I'm a Celebrity: Unpacked due to family commitments, leaving Sam Thompson and Kemi Rodgers to co-host the programme as a duo.

The first trailer for the series was unveiled in October 2026, and featured Ant & Dec conducting a choir singing "The 12 Days of Christmas", however instead of the traditional lyrics, each day was replaced with something I'm a Celebrity related, and teased "Twelve tubs of offal, eleven Dingo Dollars, ten rice and beans, nine celeb cyclones, eight vomit smoothies, seven gunge-bombs dropping, six feathers sticking, five thousand worms, four blended brains, three fish guts, two tonnes of mud and a new camp of celebrities." The series began on 16 November 2026, a day later than usual due to ITV airing the UEFA Nations League match between Spain and England. To compensate for this, ITV aired How To Survive The Jungle, a special one-off episode on 15 November.

== Celebrities ==
The official line-up was announced by ITV on 10 November 2026. AJ Odudu was seemingly eliminated from the series on the first day, however it was a fake elimination, and she returned to the camp two days later alongside late arrival Leigh Francis.

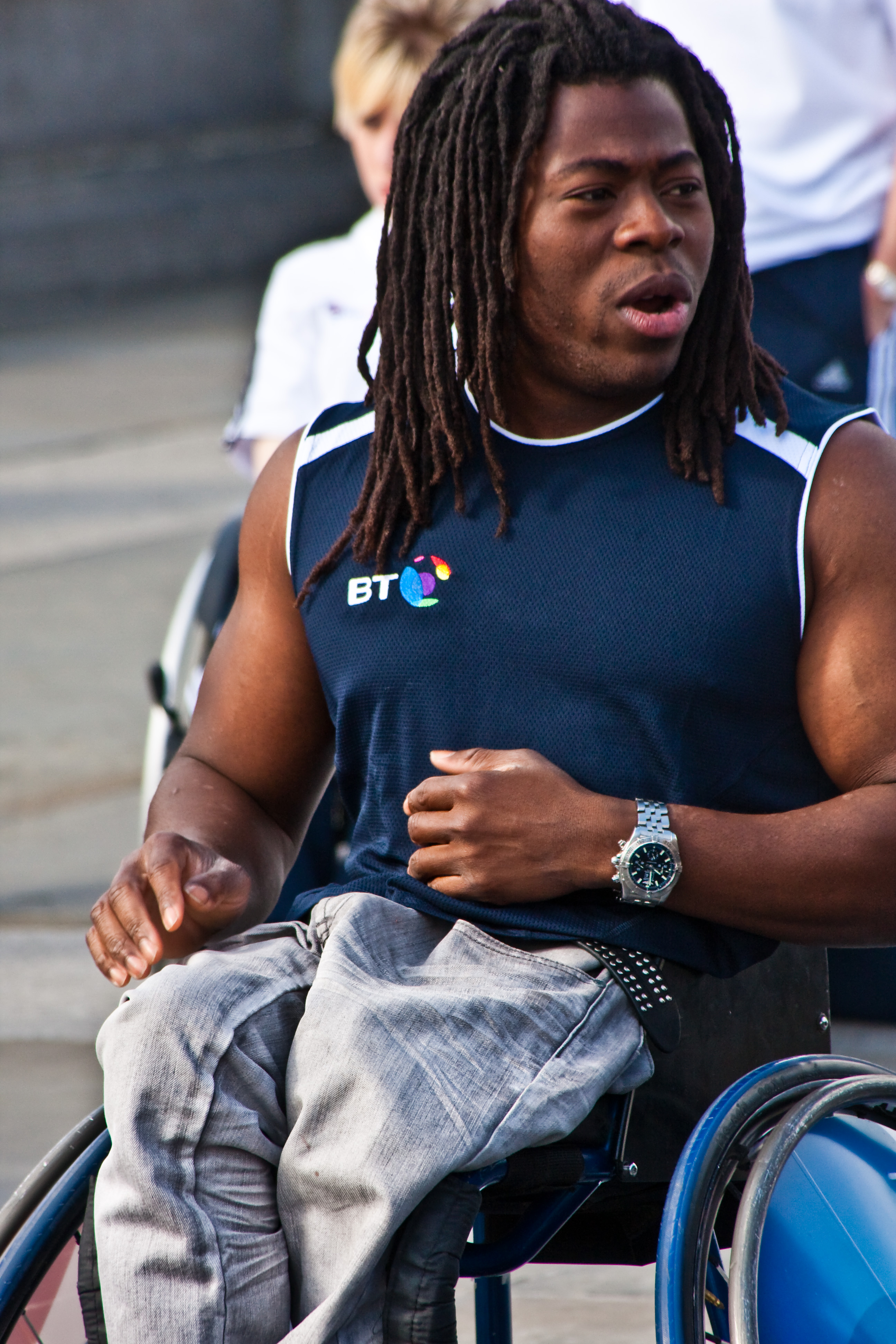
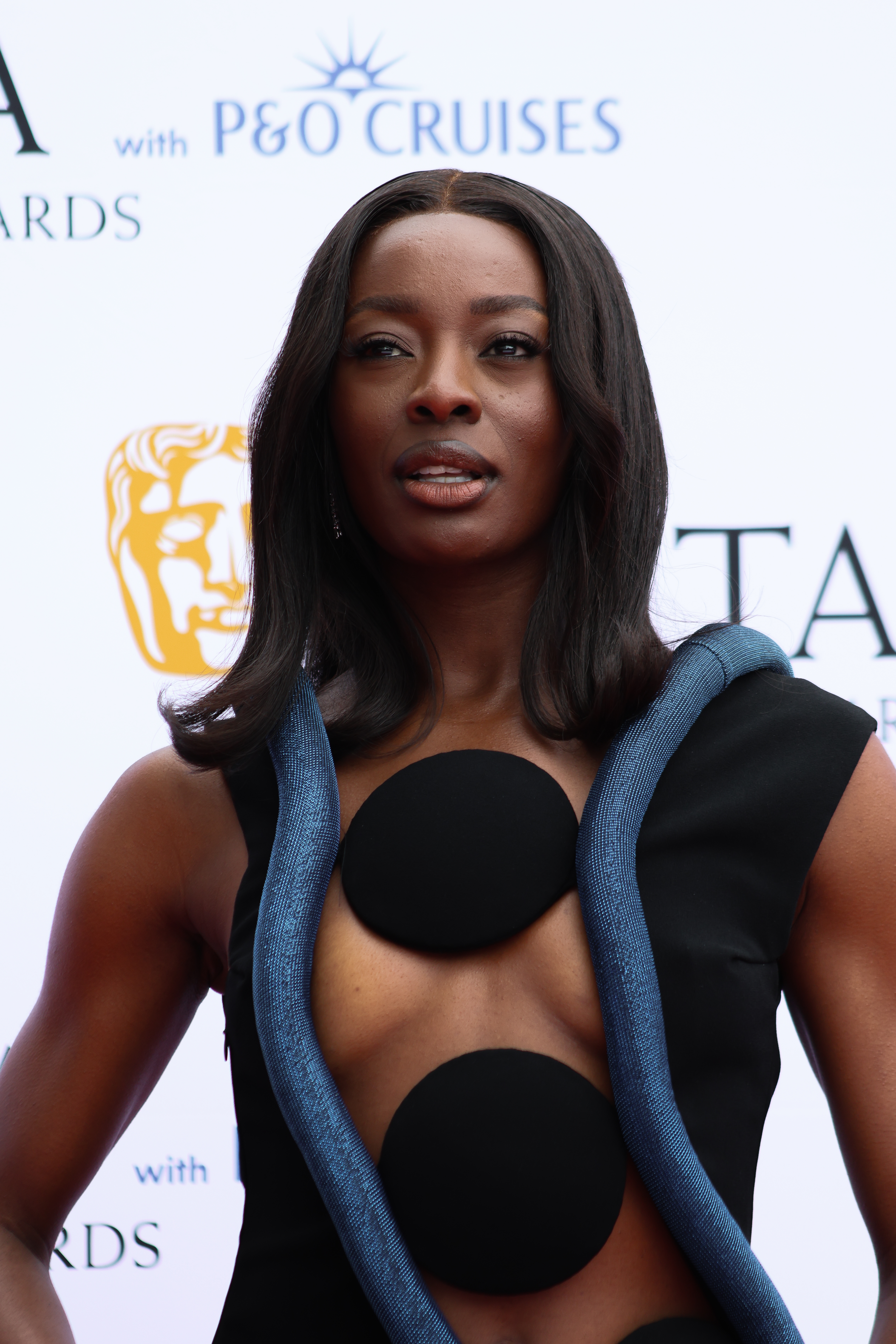
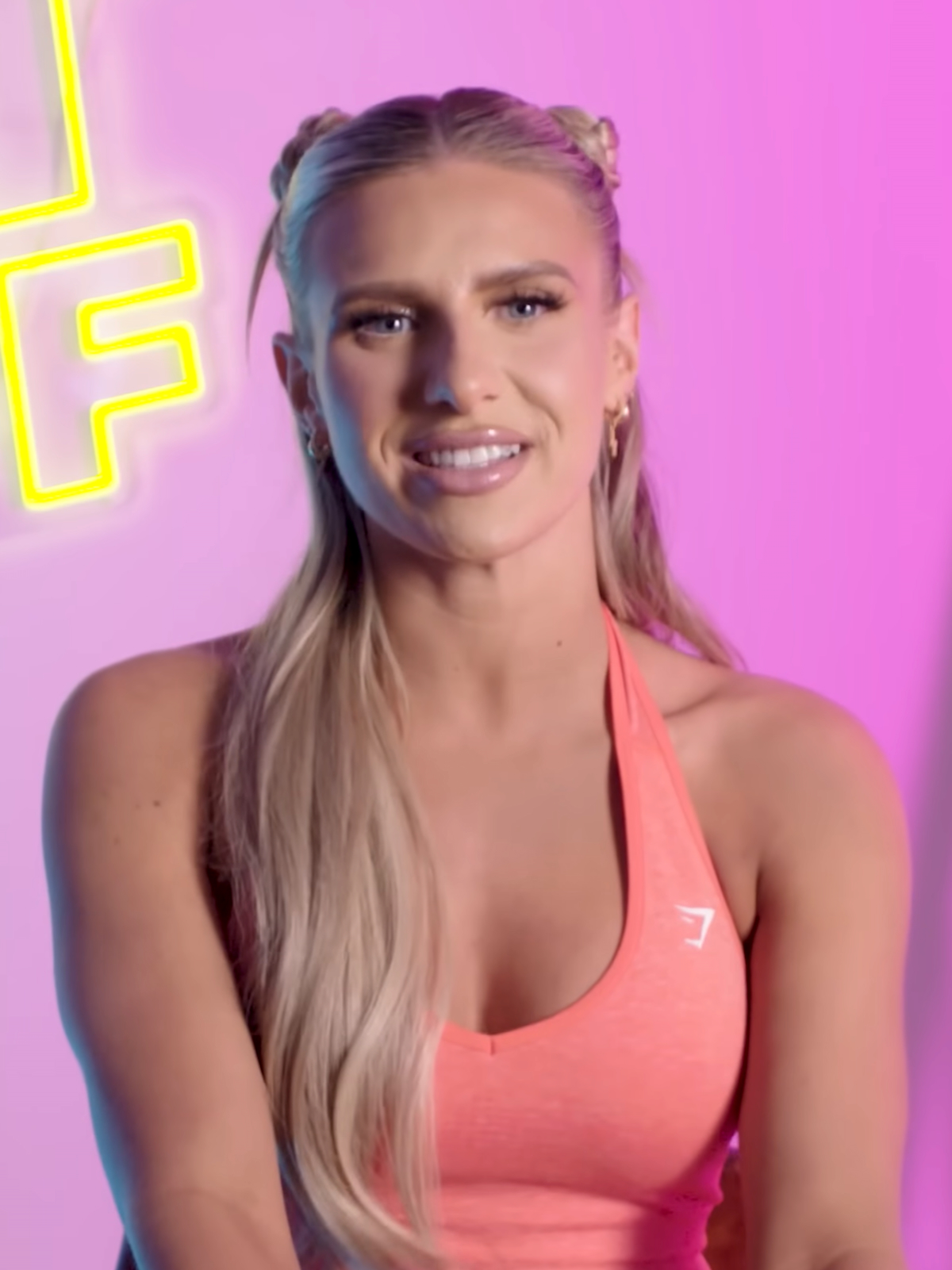
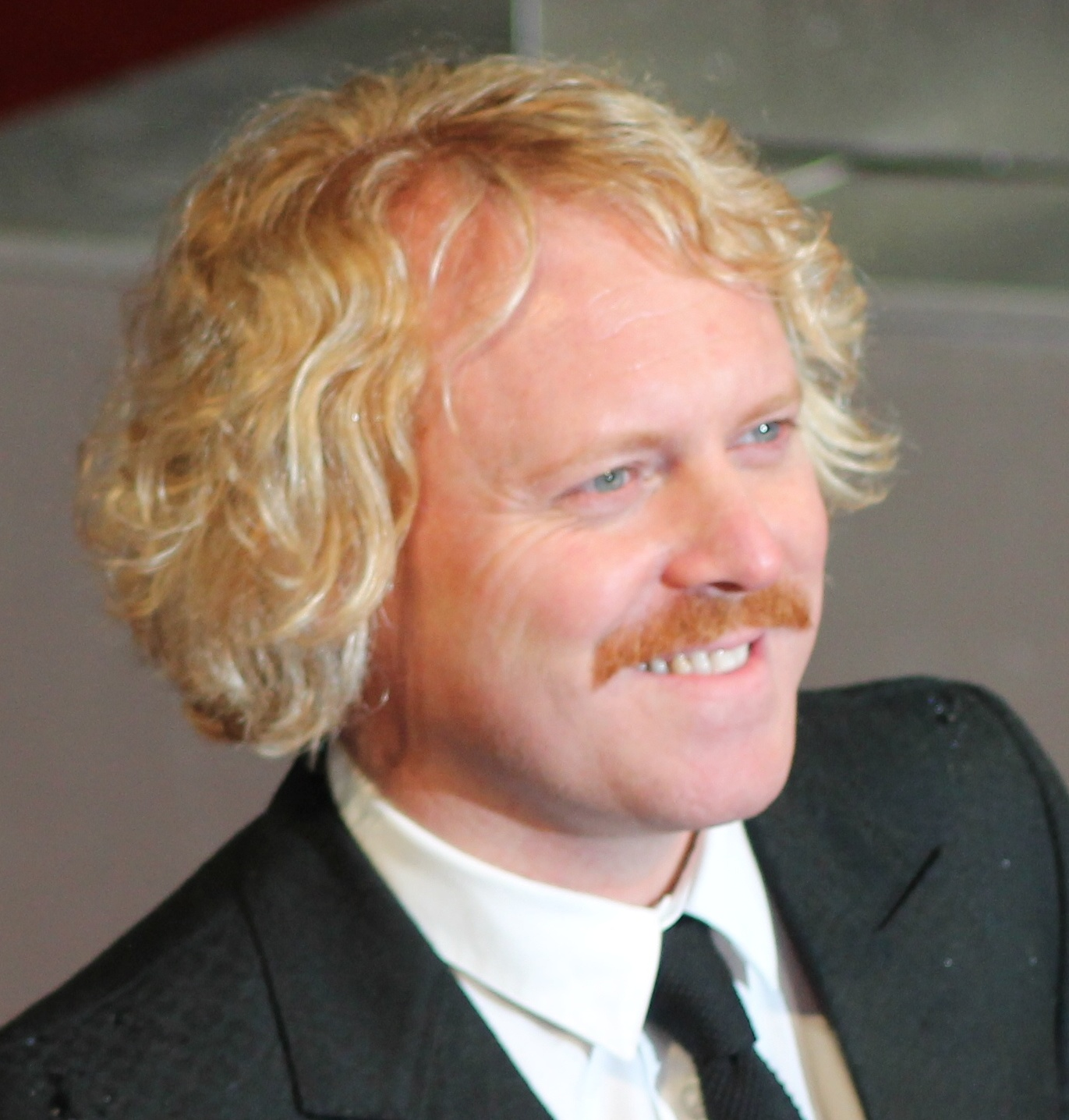
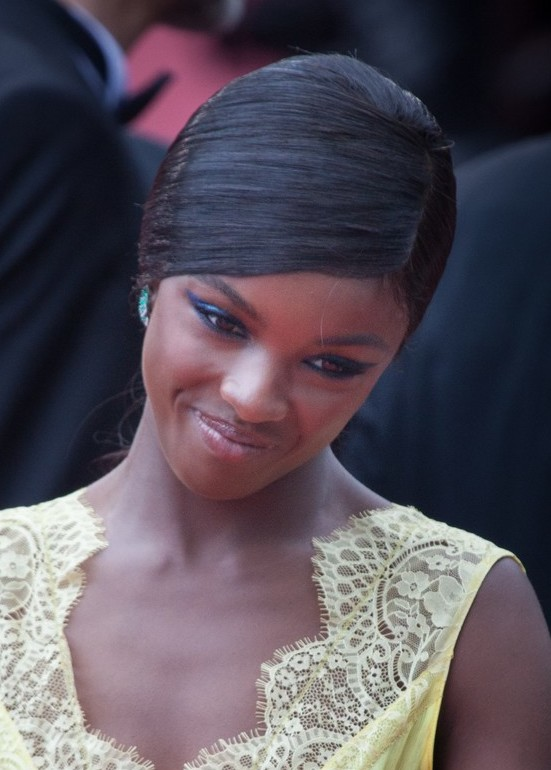
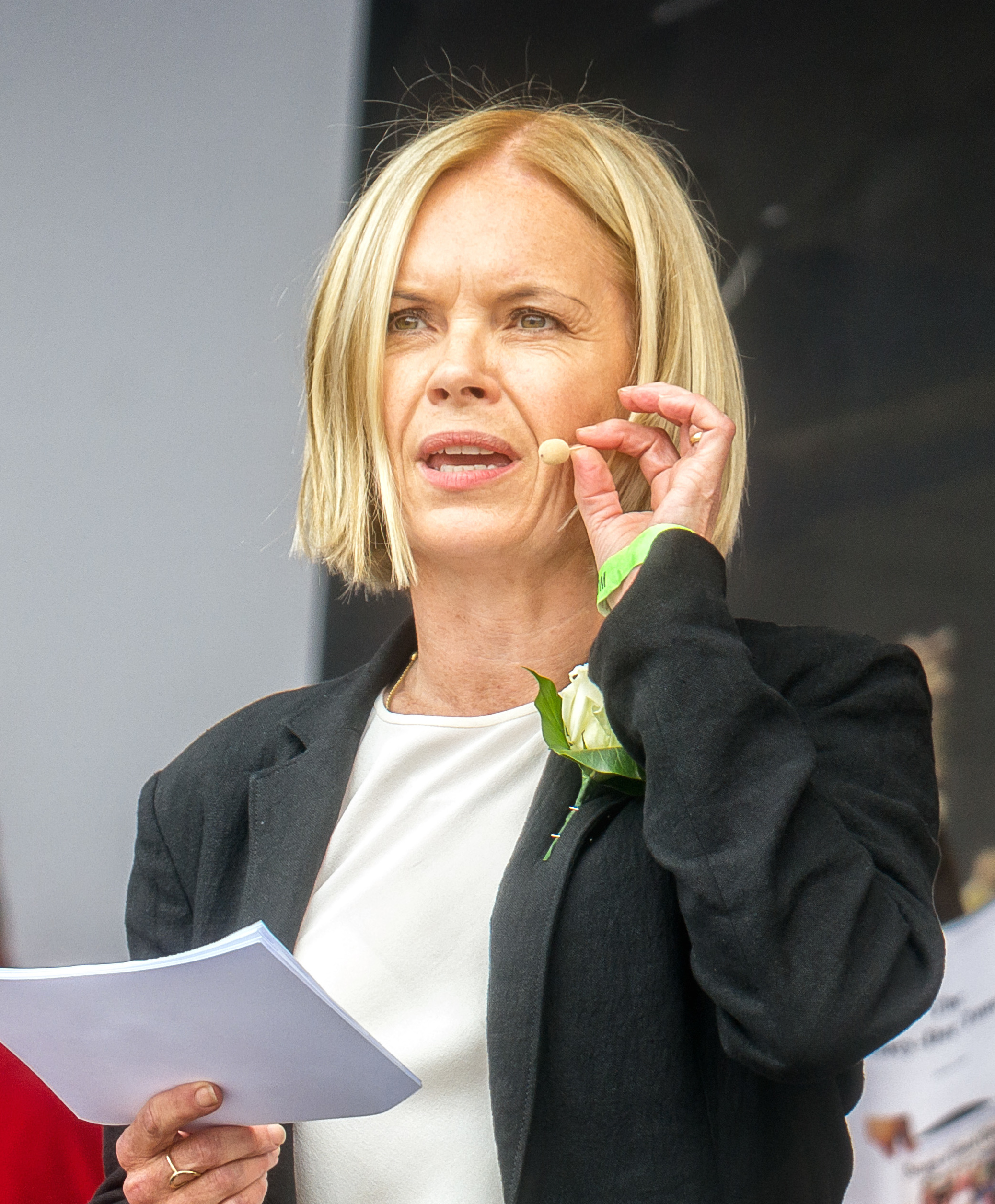
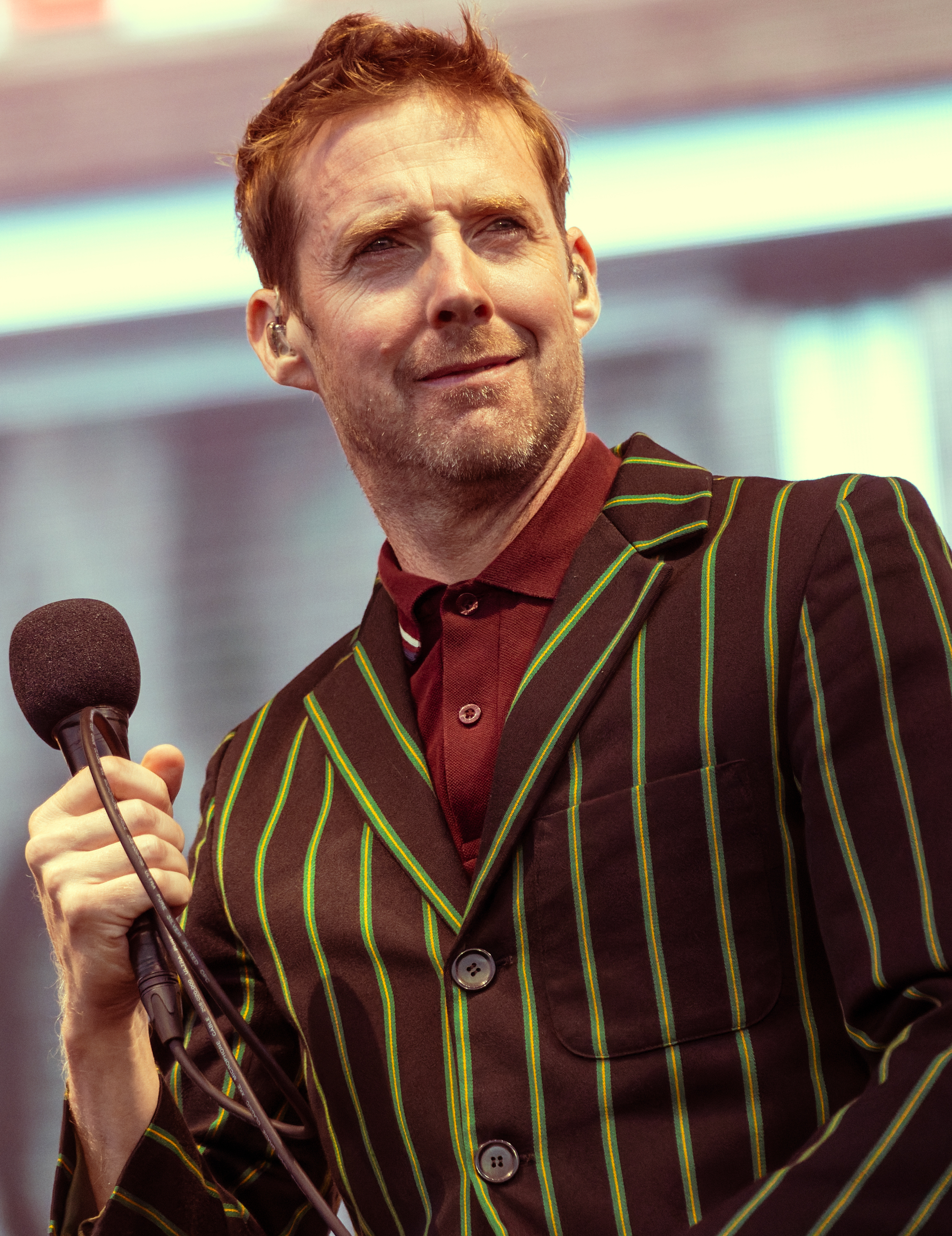
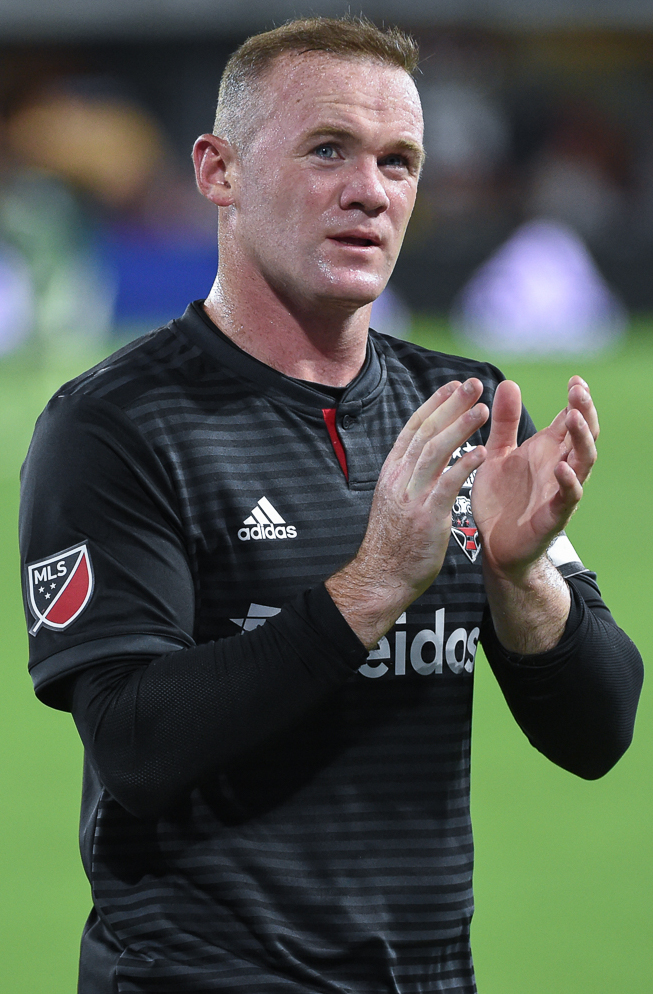
From left to right: Ade Adepitan, AJ Odudu, Chloe Burrows, Claire Sweeney, Leigh Francis, Leomie Anderson, Mariella Frostrup, Ricky Wilson, and Wayne Rooney.
Not pictured: Jack Skipper, Joanna Page, and Sharky.

Celebrity	Known for	Status
Ade Adepitan	Paralympian & television presenter	Participating
AJ Odudu	Television presenter	Participating
Chloe Burrows	Television personality & radio DJ	Participating
Claire Sweeney	Actress, singer & television presenter	Participating
Jack Skipper	Stand-up comedian & social media personality	Participating
Joanna Page	Gavin & Stacey actress	Participating
Leigh Francis	Comedian, television presenter & actor	Participating
Leomie Anderson	Supermodel & former Glow Up presenter	Participating
Mariella Frostrup	Broadcaster & journalist	Participating
Ricky Wilson	Kaiser Chiefs singer	Participating
Sharky	Social media personality	Participating
Wayne Rooney	Former England footballer & manager	Participating

== Results and elimination ==
Indicates that the celebrity was immune from the vote
Indicates that the celebrity received the most votes from the public
Indicates that the celebrity received the fewest votes and was eliminated immediately (no bottom two)
Indicates that the celebrity was named as being in the bottom two

Daily results per celebrity
Celebrity	Number of trials
Ade	3
AJ	4
Chloe	3
Claire	3
Jack	3
Joanna	3
Leigh	3
Leomie	3
Mariella	4
Ricky	2
Sharky	3
Wayne	3
Notes	
Bottom two (named in)	
Eliminated	

== Bushtucker trials ==
The contestants take part in daily trials to earn food. These trials aim to test both physical and mental abilities. The winner is usually determined by the number of stars collected during the trial, with each star representing a meal earned by the winning contestant for their fellow campmates.

The public voted for who they wanted to face the trial
The contestants decided who would face the trial
The trial was compulsory and neither the public nor celebrities decided who took part

Trial number	Air date	Name of trial	Celebrity participation	Winner/ Win or Loss/ Number of stars	Notes
1	16 November	—N/a	Claire; Joanna; Leomie; Ricky; Sharky	Joanna; Leomie; Ricky; Sharky	(Note: The celebrities were separated into two groups, in which each celebrity competed against each other in a trial to win meals for camp. The two celebrities from each group that finished last in their trial, ultimately faced an elimination trial, in which the loser was eliminated from camp. AJ was seemingly eliminated from camp, however the elimination was fake and she subsequently returned to camp two days later.)
2	16 November	—N/a	Ade; AJ; Chloe; Jack; Mariella; Wayne	Ade; Chloe; Jack; Mariella; Wayne	(Note: The celebrities were separated into two groups, in which each celebrity competed against each other in a trial to win meals for camp. The two celebrities from each group that finished last in their trial, ultimately faced an elimination trial, in which the loser was eliminated from camp. AJ was seemingly eliminated from camp, however the elimination was fake and she subsequently returned to camp two days later.)
3	16 November	Fearsome Face-Off	AJ; Claire	Claire	(Note: The celebrities were separated into two groups, in which each celebrity competed against each other in a trial to win meals for camp. The two celebrities from each group that finished last in their trial, ultimately faced an elimination trial, in which the loser was eliminated from camp. AJ was seemingly eliminated from camp, however the elimination was fake and she subsequently returned to camp two days later.)
4	17 November	The Jungle Food Lab	Chloe; Wayne	10/10 stars	
5	18 November	Caves of Catastrophe	Ade; Leomie	4/10 stars	
6	19 November	Factory of Fear	Joanna; Sharky	10/12 stars	
6	19 November	Factory of Fear	AJ; Leigh	10/12 stars	
7	20 November	Brutal Balance	Jack	12/12 stars	(Note: Ade and Mariella were exempt from this trial.)
8	21 November	Muckingham Palace	Leigh; Mariella	11/12 stars	
9	22 November	Shooting Stars	AJ; Jack; Leomie; Sharky	1/4 stars	(Note: The celebrities randomly drew a fellow campmates name and completed a trial to win a meal for their selected campmate. Those who didn't get a star meant their chosen campmate didn't get their meal.)
10	22 November	Stars Fly	Chloe; Claire; Joanna; Leigh	4/4 stars	(Note: The celebrities randomly drew a fellow campmates name and completed a trial to win a meal for their selected campmate. Those who didn't get a star meant their chosen campmate didn't get their meal.)
11	22 November	Star Smash	Ade; Mariella; Ricky; Wayne	2/4 stars	(Note: The celebrities randomly drew a fellow campmates name and completed a trial to win a meal for their selected campmate. Those who didn't get a star meant their chosen campmate didn't get their meal.)
12	23 November	The Snake Escape	Mariella		

== Star count ==
Celebrity	Number of stars earned	Percentage
Ade Adepitan	5/12 stars	42%
AJ Odudu	11/14 stars	79%
Chloe Burrows	11/11 stars	100%
Claire Sweeney	2/2 stars	100%
Jack Skipper	13/14 stars	93%
Joanna Page	11/13 stars	85%
Leigh Francis	21/24 stars	88%
Leomie Anderson	6/12 stars	50%
Mariella Frostrup	13/14 stars	93%
Ricky Wilson	2/2 stars	100%
Sharky	11/14 stars	79%
Wayne Rooney	11/12 stars	92%

== Jungle Hotline challenge ==
Unlike in past series, the "Deals on Wheels" challenges have been phased out for the Jungle Hotline; with Kiosk Kev being available for the celebrities to call on the phone instead of serving them from his jungle shop. The challenge will be based around the golden phone box and locked shut in a different way each time it closes, with the celebrities having to figure out how to open it. If successful, they will be able to phone Kev on his hotline for the chance to win a treat. Kev will call a phone box to reveal a treat inside the camp, but to be awarded it, they must complete a task or answer the question he gives them correctly and the postbox will open, though if they are not successful, their treat will be destroyed in front of them.

The celebrities got the question correct
The celebrities got the question wrong
No question was asked

Episode	Air date	Celebrities	Prize	Notes
4	19 November	Chloe; Ricky	Salty Crisps	—N/a
6	21 November	Joanna; Leomie; Sharky	Chocolate Rice Cakes	1

=== Notes ===
- ^Note 1: Claire had to answer the question without the help of her campmates as she picked up the phone to Kiosk Kev.

== Camp Leaders ==
Celebrity			Original Run		No. of days
	Leader	Deputy	First day	Last day	No. of days
1	Wayne	Claire	5		
