= Jason McCue =

British human rights lawyer (born 1969)

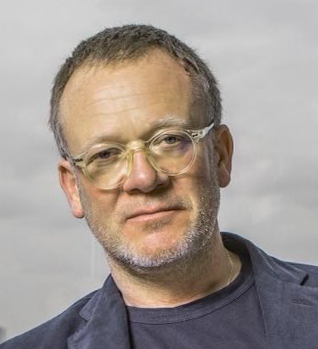
- Born: 4 June 1969 (age 57)
- Occupation: Human rights lawyer
- Spouse: Mariella Frostrup (m. 2003)
- Website: https://www.mccue-law.com/jason-mccue/

Jason McCue (born 4 June 1969) is a British human rights lawyer and international justice campaigner.

He is married to author, journalist, broadcaster and campaigner Mariella Frostrup.

== Career ==
McCue was awarded the Law Society Solicitor of the Year – Private Practice in 2009, and the European Legal Awards 2023 Human Rights Lawyer of the Year.

McCue acted as Presidential Envoy for Somaliland.

McCue is known for bringing cases on behalf of victims against terrorists, rogue states and corporations; and has been inducted in the Legal 500 Hall of Fame for his work on civil liberties and human rights. McCue Law and McCue Jury and Partners LLP subsequently represented many victims of terrorist organisations, including ISIS, the Provisional IRA, HAMAS, and Al-Aqsa Martyrs; victims of rogue regimes (in cases against / concerning Iran, Assad/Syria, Muammar al-Gaddafi/Libya.
