= Mariella Frostrup =

Norwegian-British journalist and presenter (born 1962)

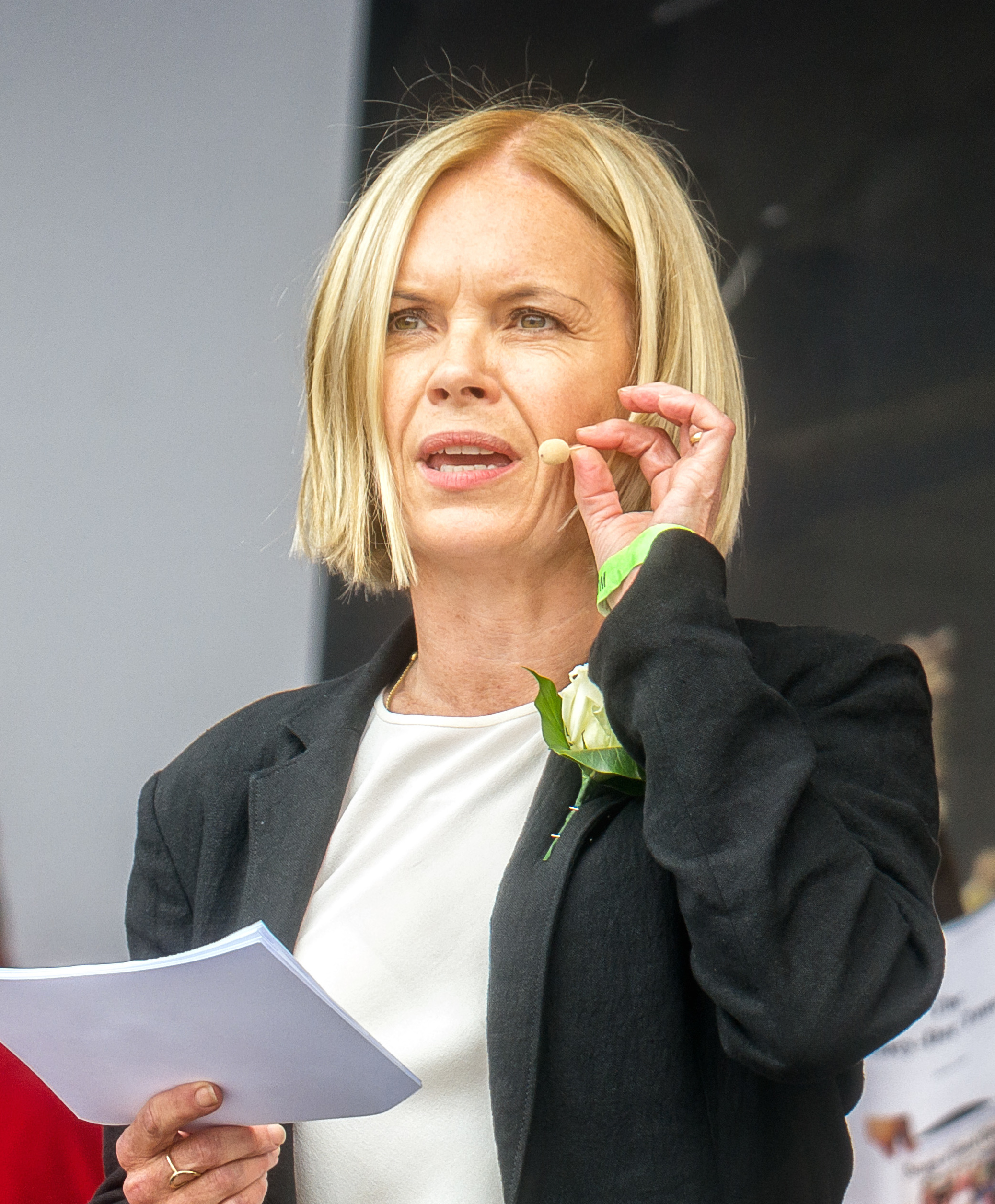
- Frostrup in 2016
- Born: 12 November 1962 (age 64); Oslo, Norway
- Citizenship: United Kingdom
- Occupations: Journalist, presenter
- Years active: 1980–present
- Spouses: Richard Jobson (m. 1979; div. 1984) Jason McCue (m. 2003)
- Children: 2

Mariella Frostrup (born 12 November 1962) is a British broadcaster, journalist and presenter.

She has written for The Daily Telegraph as a travel writer, The Guardian, The Observer, The Mail on Sunday, Harpers & Queen and the New Statesman. For almost 20 years until 2021 she was The Observer's agony aunt on its relationships page. In April 2026 she was announced as the UK Government's Womens Employment Ambassador.

== Early life ==
Frostrup was born in Oslo, Norway, to Peter and Joan Frostrup. In 1969, when she was six, the family moved to Ireland, living in Kilmacanogue, a small village near Bray in County Wicklow. Her Norwegian father was a journalist, including foreign editor, for The Irish Times, and her Scottish mother an artist. Her father died aged 44, when Frostrup was 15.

== Career ==
In 1977, after the death of her father, she moved to London to work in the music industry. Following a period training to be a tape op for the Rolling Stones Mobile Studio (during which she worked with Simple Minds on their Real to Real Cacophony album), she went on to work as a public relations executive for Phonogram Records between 1980 and 1990 and coordinated the publicity for the Live Aid concert at Wembley in 1985.

After leaving Phonogram, started television work as a presenter and film critic.

She made several guest appearances as herself in the series Coupling, including an episode where one of the characters fantasizes about her, then meets her in person. She has also appeared in fictionalised form in Michael Paraskos's In Search of Sixpence.

She has written for The Daily Telegraph as a travel writer, The Guardian, The Observer, The Mail on Sunday, Harpers & Queen and the New Statesman. For almost 20 years until 2021 she was The Observer's agony aunt on its relationships page. She is also an art critic and has been on the judging panels for the Booker Prize, the Orange Prize for Fiction and the Evening Standard British Film Awards.

In September 2007 she chaired a question-and-answer session with British Prime Minister Gordon Brown at the Labour Party Conference in Bournemouth, Dorset.

In 2008, Frostrup received an Honorary Degree of Doctor of Letters from Nottingham Trent University in recognition of her contribution and commitment to journalism and broadcasting. That same year, she narrated The Crimson Wing: Mystery of the Flamingos, a documentary about lesser flamingos.

She presented the BBC Radio 2 show The Green Room and from 2002 to 2020 was the regular presenter of BBC Radio 4 programme Open Book, interviewing authors and publishers and reviewing new fiction and non-fiction books. As the presenter of The Book Show on Sky Arts 1, she interviewed an extensive list of guests on their recent works and their "favourite heroes and heroines from fiction". The show was cancelled in 2013.

In December 2012, she appeared on the BBC Two series World's Most Dangerous Roads, in which she and Angus Deayton were filmed driving along the east coast of Madagascar.

She is the voice in lifts on the London Overground. Her 'gravelly' voice is often used on television commercials and in 2005 was voted the sexiest female voice on television.

In 2014, Frostrup hosted an event at the British Film Institute celebrating 30 years of the TV programme Spitting Image. Frostrup was one of the celebrities portrayed as a puppet on that programme.

In 2018, Frostrup presented a documentary for BBC One called The Truth About The Menopause. She later published a book on the subject and has spoken of her own experience of menopause.{{}cn}}

In 2019, she presented a programme for BBC Radio 4 called Bringing Up Britain.

In June 2020 she joined Times Radio to present a programme in the early afternoon from Monday to Thursday. It features celebrity interviews, alongside arts, culture and social issues coverage. She left the station in 2024.

In 2022, Frostrup was the presenter of the documentary series Britain's Novel Landscapes with Mariella Frostrup; which investigates how British landscapes have influenced some of the UK's best loved authors.

Since July 2024, Frostrup has been a regular panellist on ITV's flagship lunchtime show Loose Women.

In October 2024, Frostrup was announced as the UK Government's Menopause Employment Ambassador.

In 2026, Frostrup appeared as a contestant on the twenty-sixth series of I'm a Celebrity...Get Me Out of Here!.

== Advocacy ==
Frostrup's political views have been described as "a bit left-of-centre". She has been active in the charity sector for two decades, having worked on Band Aid and Comic Relief along with various fundraising initiatives for Oxfam, The Children's Society and Save the Children. Campaigning for women's rights and gender equality has become her main focus; she has recently made several trips to Africa to meet women and young girls in their communities, and experience first hand the realities and inequalities of the lives that they lead.

In 2010 she created, along with three other trustees, the Gender Rights and Equality Action Trust. This foundation aims at fostering gender equality and raising awareness and funds, to support grassroots gender equality projects in Africa and beyond. The GREAT Initiative works in partnership with Femmes Africa Solidarité, an African charity.

In 2015 she signed an open letter for which the ONE Campaign had been collecting signatures; the letter was addressed to Angela Merkel and Nkosazana Dlamini-Zuma, urging them to focus on women as they served as the head of the G7 in Germany and the African Union in South Africa respectively, as it started to set the priorities in development funding before a main UN summit in September 2015 that would establish new development goals for the generation.

In 2021 she became President of the Somerset branch of CPRE, the Countryside Charity.

In 2022 she founded Menopause Mandate with Davina McCall, Penny Lancaster and others, to campaign for greater awareness of the impact of the menopause. In 2024 she was appointed Government Menopause Employment Ambassador. In this capacity she works with an independent Menopause Advisory Group whose role is to help businesses to support women working during their menopause.

== Personal life ==
Frostup holds British citizenship.

Frostrup was first married (1979–1984) to Richard Jobson, lead singer with the punk rock group Skids. On a charity trek in Nepal, aged 39, Frostrup met human rights lawyer Jason McCue. They were married two years later. They live near Bruton, Somerset (with a flat in London), and have two children.

Frostrup has four siblings, and is a close friend of television presenter Penny Smith and of actress Gina Bellman, one of the stars of Coupling, in which Frostrup had a cameo role alongside Angus Deayton.

== Bibliography ==
- Frostrup, Mariella – Dear Mariella: an Indispensable Guide to Twenty-First Century Living – Bloomsbury, 2004 ISBN 978-0-7475-7441-5
- Frostrup, Mariella – Cracking the Menopause: While Keeping Yourself Together – Bluebird, 2021 ISBN 978-1-5290-5903-8
