= Niko Omilana =

British YouTuber (born 1998)

- Omilana in 2023
- Born: Nikolas Daniel Adegbajumo Omilana; 4 March 1998 (age 28); Stafford, England
- Occupations: YouTuber; Political candidate
- Political party: Independent

YouTube information
- Channel: Niko Omilana
- Years active: 2011–present
- Genres: Entertainment; comedy; politics
- Subscribers: 9.03 million
- Views: 819.13 million
- Last updated: 12 October 2026
- Website: shadesbyniko.com

Nikolas Daniel Adegbajumo Omilana (/ˈnɪ.koʊ ɒ.mɪˈlɑː.nə/ NI-koh o-mi-LAH-nə; born 4 March 1998) is a British YouTuber, prankster and political candidate. He is known for posting prank, comedy, vlogging and challenge videos on YouTube and for running as an independent candidate in the 2021 London mayoral election and the 2024 general election, being unsuccessful in both elections. He is also known for being a part of the Beta Squad YouTube group. Omilana has also competed in several charity football matches, including Soccer Aid and multiple Sidemen charity matches. In 2025, he launched a confectionery brand, Shades by Niko, was a contestant on the first series of The Celebrity Traitors and became the manager of NDL FC in Baller League UK. He won Best Media Personality at the 2026 MOBO Awards.

== Early life and personal life ==
Nikolas Daniel Adegbajumo Omilana was born on 4 March 1998 in London to an English mother and a Yoruba Nigerian father. Omilana grew up in Stafford.

== YouTube career ==
=== 2011–2017: Early career ===
Omilana created his YouTube account, "Niko Omilana", in June 2011. He uploaded his first video in 2014 and started uploading comedy skits, parody, and challenge videos. In an interview in October 2019, he cited British YouTuber KSI as his inspiration to start making content on YouTube.

=== 2018–2020: Initial popularity and Beta Squad ===
In May 2018, Omilana went viral after he uploaded a video titled "UNDERCOVER As A RACIST For 24 HOURS" in which he went undercover as a racist to troll and mock supporters of a far-right organisation, the English Defence League (EDL), during their protest in Telford, Shropshire. Later in December 2018, Omilana uploaded another prank video, continuing his previous EDL prank video, in which he trolled one of the co-founders of the EDL and far-right activist, Tommy Robinson, to promote Omilana's brand and merch, the NDL (Niko Defence League).

In 2019, Omilana created and joined the Beta Squad, a British YouTube collective group, along with fellow British YouTubers Chunkz, AJ Shabeel, Sharky, and King Kenny. In February 2019, it was also announced that the group would be living together in a £4 million mansion in London, where they would create daily content for social media platforms.

On 28 August 2019, he reached one million subscribers on YouTube. In November 2019, Omilana went viral after he attempted to sneak into the KSI vs. Logan Paul II boxing re-match and enter the ring. In December 2019, Omilana appeared on Business Insider's list of "20 YouTube channels you should really subscribe to in 2020". In 2020, Omilana was nominated for a Shorty Award for Breakout YouTuber at the 12th Shorty Awards, losing to Alexandra Mary Hirschi.

=== 2021–present: Collaboration and continued growth ===
Omilana was the subject of controversy in 2022 due to a 2021 video showing conditions within a poultry farm. Animal rights activists investigated the same location two months later and found living conditions for chickens to be considerably worse than those depicted in Omilana's video. Omilana's agency said, "Whilst we take these allegations very seriously and will speak with KFC about these claims, the filming that our client took part in accurately reported the conditions he saw and experienced on the day."

In May 2022, Omilana went viral after he uploaded a video titled "I Pranked America's Most Racist Man", in which he disguised himself as a journalist for the BBC and travelled to Harrison, Arkansas, to prank Ku Klux Klan grand wizard, Thomas Robb into saying "BLM" (short for the anti-racist slogan "Black Lives Matter") on camera during a fake interview.

In March 2023, Omilana collaborated with American YouTuber and prankster JiDion and created a prank series on YouTube called "The Biggest Menace", where they competed with each other to pull off as many pranks as they could in a bid to earn the title of "the biggest menace", with each episode uploaded on both Omilana's and JiDion's personal channels. They later attracted media attention after they uploaded an episode of the series called "We Pranked The Mona Lisa", in which Omilana challenged JiDion to sneak in a painting of himself right next to the Mona Lisa painting, which later caused JiDion to get arrested by the French police.

In April 2023, Omilana was arrested and kicked by a police officer during an attempted visit to the disputed micronation of Liberland. The incident received coverage in Croatian and Serbian media.

On 13 July 2024, Omilana appeared and participated in a MrBeast video titled "50 YouTubers Fight for $1,000,000".

In May 2025, Omilana was announced as one of the contestants on the first series of The Celebrity Traitors. He also announced his new sweet brand, Shades by Niko, on 10 May, which were released nationally in the UK on 21 May. Along with the brand's launch, three flavours were released: The Originals, Tropical Blast, and Straight Up Strawberry.

In the second season of Baller League UK, which began in October 2025, Omilana became the manager of his own team, NDL FC. In March 2026, he won Best Media Personality at the MOBO Awards.

== Electoral candidacies ==
In the 2021 London mayoral election, Omilana ran as an independent candidate. Omilana received 49,628 votes in the election, securing 2% of the total votes cast, making him the highest-placed independent candidate, beating other popular independents Piers Corbyn, Laurence Fox, and Count Binface. Among his campaign pledges, Omilana suggested turning McDonald's restaurants into social housing and removing the teeth of racists. Omilana also attempted to run at the 2024 London mayoral election, but his nomination form was declared invalid.

In the 2024 general election, Omilana received attention after candidates named "Niko Omilana" registered as candidates in at least 11 different constituencies, prompting a police investigation as it is an offence to provide false information on nomination papers. Standing as a candidate in more than one constituency is also an offence. Omilana claimed that he convinced people to legally change their names to "Niko Omilana" so that different candidates could stand under his name in several constituencies. Each person standing as "Niko Omilana" were resident at a different address and had nomination papers that were signed by different members of the public. Omilana himself stood in Richmond and Northallerton, where then-prime minister Rishi Sunak was the incumbent member of parliament. He was able to obtain 160 votes. After Sunak was confirmed as the winner of his constituency's election, he conceded the general election, in which Labour were on the verge of officially winning. During his concession speech, Omilana attracted media attention when he pranked Sunak by holding up a piece of paper with the letter "L" behind him, which referred to Sunak as a "loser".

== Charity football matches ==
Omilana has participated in multiple charity football matches, starting with the 2022 Sidemen charity match, where Omilana scored twice in the 9th and 74th minutes for team YouTube Allstars. A year later, Omilana also played in the 2023 Sidemen charity match, scoring in the 86th minute for team YouTube Allstars. On 8 March 2025, he played in the 2025 Sidemen charity match, held at the Wembley Stadium, for team YouTube Allstars. He scored a goal during the match's penalty shoot-out.

On 11 June 2023, Omilana participated in Soccer Aid 2023, a charity football match held at the Old Trafford stadium in Manchester, England, where he played for team World XI.

On 2 June 2024, Omilana played and hosted a charity football match along with the Beta Squad and American YouTube group AMP at Selhurst Park in London, England. The event raised money for The Water Project. Omilana scored one goal in the 82nd minute for team Beta Squad, before the match ended in a 6–6 draw after a pitch invasion forced the game to be called off.

== Television ==
In May 2025, Omilana was announced to be a contestant on the first series of The Celebrity Traitors. He was selected as a Faithful but was the first player to be banished in episode 2. When asked on leaving, Omilana said, "It feels sad because I wanted to go far, but someone has to go early."

== Filmography ==
=== Television ===
Year(s)	Title	Role	Notes	Ref.
2024	The Wheel	Himself	Celebrity Expert	
2025	The Celebrity Traitors	Himself	Contestant; series 1	
2025–present	Baller League UK	Himself	Six-a-side football league	

=== Web ===
Year(s)	Title	Role	Episodes	Ref.
2023	The Biggest Menace	Himself	7	

=== Music videos ===
Year	Title	Artist(s)	Role	Ref.
2019	"Vibranium"	Chunkz feat. Neji	Himself	

== Awards and nominations ==
Ceremony	Year	Category	Recipient	Result	Ref.
Rated Awards	2021	Personality of the Year	Himself	Won	
Shorty Awards	2020	Breakout YouTuber	Himself	Nominated	
MOBO Awards	2026	Best Media Personality	Himself	Won	

== Election history ==
Mayor of London election 6 May 2021
Party	Candidate	1st round		2nd round			1st round votesTransfer votes, 2nd round
Party	Candidate	Total	Of round	Transfers	Total	Of round	1st round votesTransfer votes, 2nd round
Labour	Sadiq Khan	1,013,721	40.0%	192,313	1,206,034	55.2%	
Conservative	Shaun Bailey	893,051	35.3%	84,550	977,601	44.8%	
Green	Siân Berry	197,976	7.8%				
Liberal Democrats	Luisa Porritt	111,716	4.4%				
Independent	Niko Omilana	49,628	2.0%				
Reclaim	Laurence Fox	47,634	1.9%				
London Real	Brian Rose	31,111	1.2%				
Rejoin EU	Richard Hewison	28,012	1.1%				
Count Binface	Count Binface	24,775	1.0%				
Women's Equality	Mandu Reid	21,182	0.8%				
Let London Live	Piers Corbyn	20,604	0.8%				
Animal Welfare	Vanessa Hudson	16,826	0.7%				
UKIP	Peter Gammons	14,393	0.6%				
Independent	Farah London	11,869	0.5%				
Heritage	David Kurten	11,025	0.4%				
Independent	Nims Obunge	9,682	0.4%				
SDP	Steve Kelleher	8,764	0.3%				
Renew	Kam Balayev	7,774	0.3%				
Independent	Max Fosh	6,309	0.2%				
Burning Pink	Valerie Brown	5,305	0.2%				
Labour hold							

General election 2024: Richmond and Northallerton
Party	Candidate	Votes	%	±%
Conservative	Rishi Sunak	23,059	47.5	−15.8
Labour	Tom Wilson	10,874	22.4	6.0
Reform	Lee Taylor	7,142	14.7	New
Liberal Democrats	Daniel Callaghan	4,322	8.9	−3.6
Green	Kevin Foster	2,058	4.2	0.4
Binface	Count Binface	308	0.6	New
Independent	Brian Richmond	222	0.5	New
Independent	Niko Omilana	160	0.3	New
Yorkshire	Rio Goldhammer	132	0.3	−1.8
Monster Raving Loony	Sir Archibald Stanton	99	0.2	New
Workers Party	Louise Dickens	90	0.2	New
Independent	Angie Campion	33	0.1	New
Independent	Jason Barnett	27	0.1	New
Majority		12,185		
Turnout		73,888	66	−5.6
