= Chunkz =

British YouTuber (born 1996)

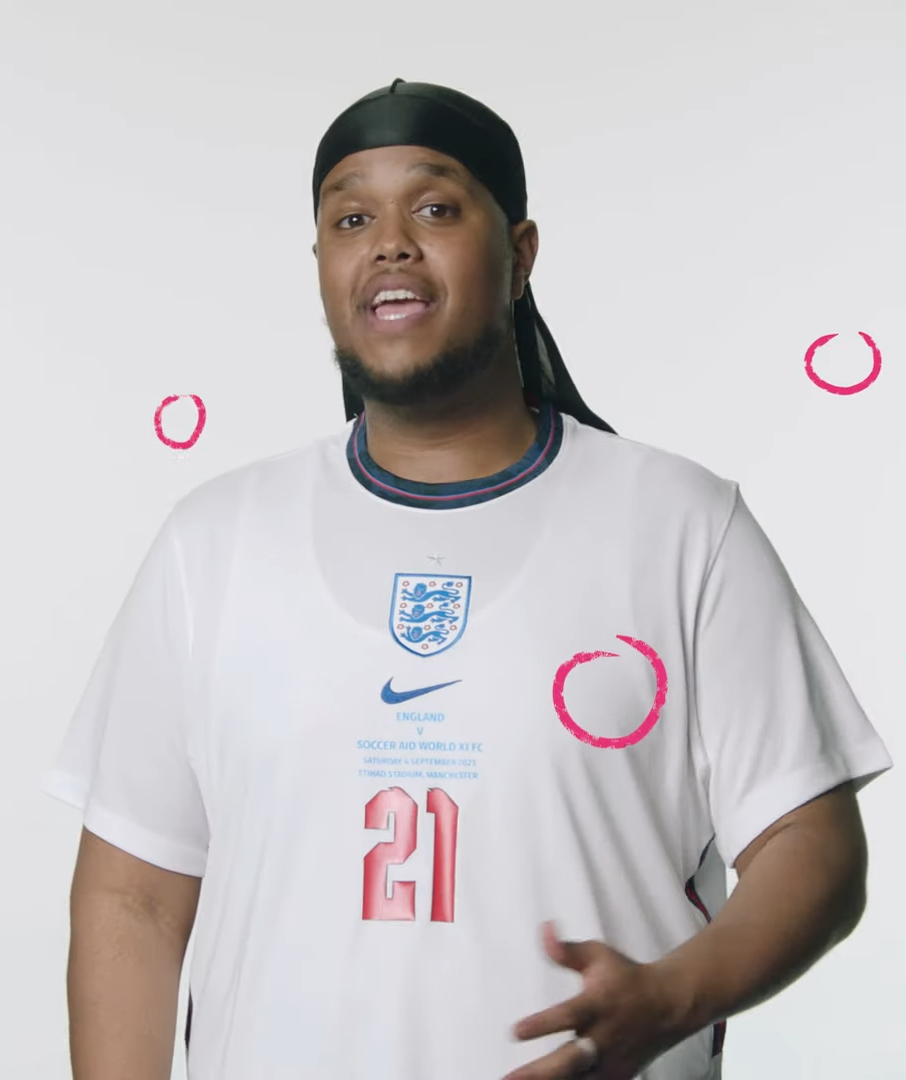
- Mohamed in 2021
- Born: Amin Mohamed; 21 February 1996 (age 30); London, England
- Education: London Metropolitan University (dropped out)
- Occupations: YouTuber; Internet personality

YouTube information
- Channel: Chunkz
- Years active: 2015-present
- Genres: Entertainment; comedy; music; rap; R&B
- Subscribers: 4.03 million
- Views: 363 million
- Last updated: 10 August 2026

Amin Mohamed (Somali: Aamin Maxamed, [ɑːmɪn mæħæmed]; born 21 February 1996), better known as Chunkz, is a British YouTuber, influencer, host, entertainer, and former musician. He is a member of the YouTube group Beta Squad. As of November 2024, his YouTube channel had over 3.6 million subscribers and 294 million video views.

== Early life and personal life ==
Amin Mohamed was born on 21 February 1996, in North West London. He is the youngest of five siblings. He is a second-generation British Somali, as his parents immigrated from Somaliland in the 1980s. Before his career on YouTube, he worked at Cineworld, where he met fellow Beta Squad member AJ Shabeel. He studied financial mathematics at the London Metropolitan University for a year before dropping out in 2016 to focus on YouTube.

He is Muslim and a supporter of Arsenal F.C.

== Career ==
=== YouTube ===
Mohamed registered the "Chunkz" account on 23 July 2015. His early YouTube videos included vlogs, challenges, pranks, and more; they also included his friend Sharky and his cousin, Darkest Man. In an interview in October 2019, he cited British YouTuber KSI as his inspiration to started making content on YouTube. In 2017, he quit his job at Cineworld to become a full-time YouTuber.

He formed a duo with Yung Filly and contributed to YouTube channels. Mohamed and Yung Filly also starred in the Footasylum YouTube series known as Does the Shoe Fit?.

In 2018, Mohamed won the International Somali Award for Best Entertainer.

In 2019, Mohamed created and joined the Beta Squad, a British YouTube collective group, along with fellow British YouTubers Niko Omilana, AJ Shabeel, Sharky, and King Kenny. In February 2019, it was also announced that the group would be living together in a £4 million mansion in a secret location in London, where they will create daily content for platforms including YouTube, Instagram and Snapchat. The group also created a shared channel called "Beta Squad" and would upload their collaborative content there. The group would go on to star features such as: Ed Sheeran, Stormzy, Dylan Cartlidge, KSI and Dave.

On 13 July 2024, he appeared in a MrBeast video titled "50 YouTubers Fight for $1,000,000" along with other influencers.

=== Music ===
Mohamed started his music career in 2018 with his first song, "Vibranium", a tropical house and dance song featuring Neji.

In March 2020, Mohamed released his first rap single, "Clean Up", with Yung Filly. In October 2020, Mohamed and Yung Filly followed the initial track by dropping their new single and music video, which were titled "Hold".

In May 2021, Mohamed announced that he was retiring from music since he believed that it was incompatible with his religious beliefs.

=== Other ventures ===
Mohamed played the role of Asznee in Big Shaq's 2017 music video, "Man's Not Hot". In March 2018, Mohamed, along with Michael Dapaah, helped launch a voice app for the Google Assistant for the train ticket retailer Trainline, which focuses on rail journey planning.

Mohamed appeared in the 2020 comedy-horror movie, Are We Dead Yet?, written and directed by Fredi Nwaka. In September 2020, Mohamed was announced as the co-host of the Sky Sports Saturday morning show, Saturday Social. During that month, he was also announced as a co-host for the extreme sports competition, The Aphetor Games, which stars content creators and influencers. In December 2020, he hosted the 2020 MOBO Awards with Maya Jama.

Mohamed, an Arsenal supporter, made an appearance in the Amazon Original sports docu-series All or Nothing: Arsenal, which documented the club by spending time with the coaching staff and players behind the scenes both on and off the field throughout their 2021–22 season.

In October 2023, Mohamed started a podcast with Yung Filly called The Chunkz and Filly Show. In November 2024, Mohamed was announced as a co-host, alongside Olivia Buzaglo for Baller League UK, a six-a-side football competition set to be broadcast on Sky Sports in March 2025.

== Charity football matches ==
Since 2020, Mohamed has participated in annual charity football events, including Soccer Aid and Sidemen Charity Matches.

On 23 February 2024, Mohamed took part in "Match for Hope 2024", a football charity match hosted at Ahmad Bin Ali Stadium, Qatar, where he captained team Chunkz, who played against team AboFlah, captained by AboFlah, a Kuwaiti YouTuber. The match ended with team Chunkz's 7–5 victory over team AboFlah. They managed to raise more than $8.8 million to support Qatar's Education Above All Foundation.

On 2 June 2024, Mohamed played and hosted a football charity match along with the Beta Squad and American YouTube group AMP at Selhurst Park, London, England. The event raised money for The Water Project. The match ended in a 6–6 draw after a pitch invasion forced the game to be called off.

On 14 February 2025, Mohamed participated in "Match for Hope 2025", a football charity event hosted in Stadium 974, Qatar, as a captain for team Chunkz & IShowSpeed, facing off against team AboFlah & KSI. The match ended with team AboFlah & KSI's 6–5 victory over team Chunkz & IShowSpeed. The event raised more than $10.7 million for charity.

== Filmography ==
Film
Year	Title	Role	Notes	Ref.
2020	Are We Dead Yet?	Ghost		
2024	The Sidemen Story	Himself	Documentary; Cameo	

Web roles
Year	Title	Role	Network(s)	Notes	Ref.
2020–2021	Saturday Social	Himself	Sky Sports	Co-host	
2020	The Aphetor Games	Himself	Online	Co-host	
2020	2020 MOBO Awards	Himself	BBC One and YouTube	Co-host	
2020	Chicken Shop Date	Himself	YouTube	Episode 36 with Yung Filly	

Television
Year	Title	Role	Network	Notes	Ref.
2022	All or Nothing: Arsenal	Himself	Prime Video	Documentary	
2022	Bad Chefs	Himself	ITV2	Presenter	
2025–present	Baller League UK	Himself	Sky Sports	Host	

Chunkz in music videosMusic videos
Year	Title	Artist(s)	Role	Ref.
2017	"Man's Not Hot"	Michael Dapaah	Asznee	
2018	"Man Don't Dance"	Michael Dapaah	Asznee	
2019	"Buss It Down"	Michael Dapaah	Asznee	
2021	"100 Bags Freestyle"	Yung Filly	Himself	
2022	"My Life"	Aj Shabeel	Himself	
2022	"Don't Lie"	A1 x J1 feat. Nemzzz	Himself	
2022	"Are You Entertained"	Russ feat. Ed Sheeran	Himself	
2023	"Voices"	KSI feat. Oliver Tree	Fiancé	
2024	"1 By 1"	Michael Hamilton	Himself	

== Discography ==
List of singles with selected chart positions and year released
Title	Year	Peak chart positions				Certifications	Album
Title	Year	UK	UK Ind.	NZ Hot	SCO	Certifications	Album
"Vibranium" (featuring Neji)	2018	—	—	—	—	BPI: Silver	Non-album singles
"Clean Up" (with Yung Filly)	2019	67	—	—	—		Non-album singles
"Hold" (with Yung Filly)	2019	29	3	35	31		Non-album singles
"Confidence" (with Yung Filly and Geko)	2020	—	—	—	—		Non-album singles
"Insecure Love" (with Zion Foster)	2020	—	—	—	—		Welcome to the Lion's Den
"Lingo" (with Deno and J.I the Prince of N.Y)	2021	57	—	—	—		Boy Meets World

== Awards and nominations ==
Ceremony	Year	Category	Recipient(s)	Result	Ref.
International Somali Awards	2018	Best Entertainer	Himself	Won	
MOBO Awards	2020	Best Media Personality	Himself	Nominated	
MOBO Awards	2021	Best Media Personality	Himself & Yung Filly	Won	
MOBO Awards	2022	Best Media Personality	Himself	Nominated	
Rated Awards	2020	Personality of the Year	Himself	Won	
Rated Awards	2021	Personality of the Year	Himself	Nominated	
Rated Awards	2022	Personality of the Year	Himself	Nominated	
