= Chloe Burrows =

English television personality (born 1995)

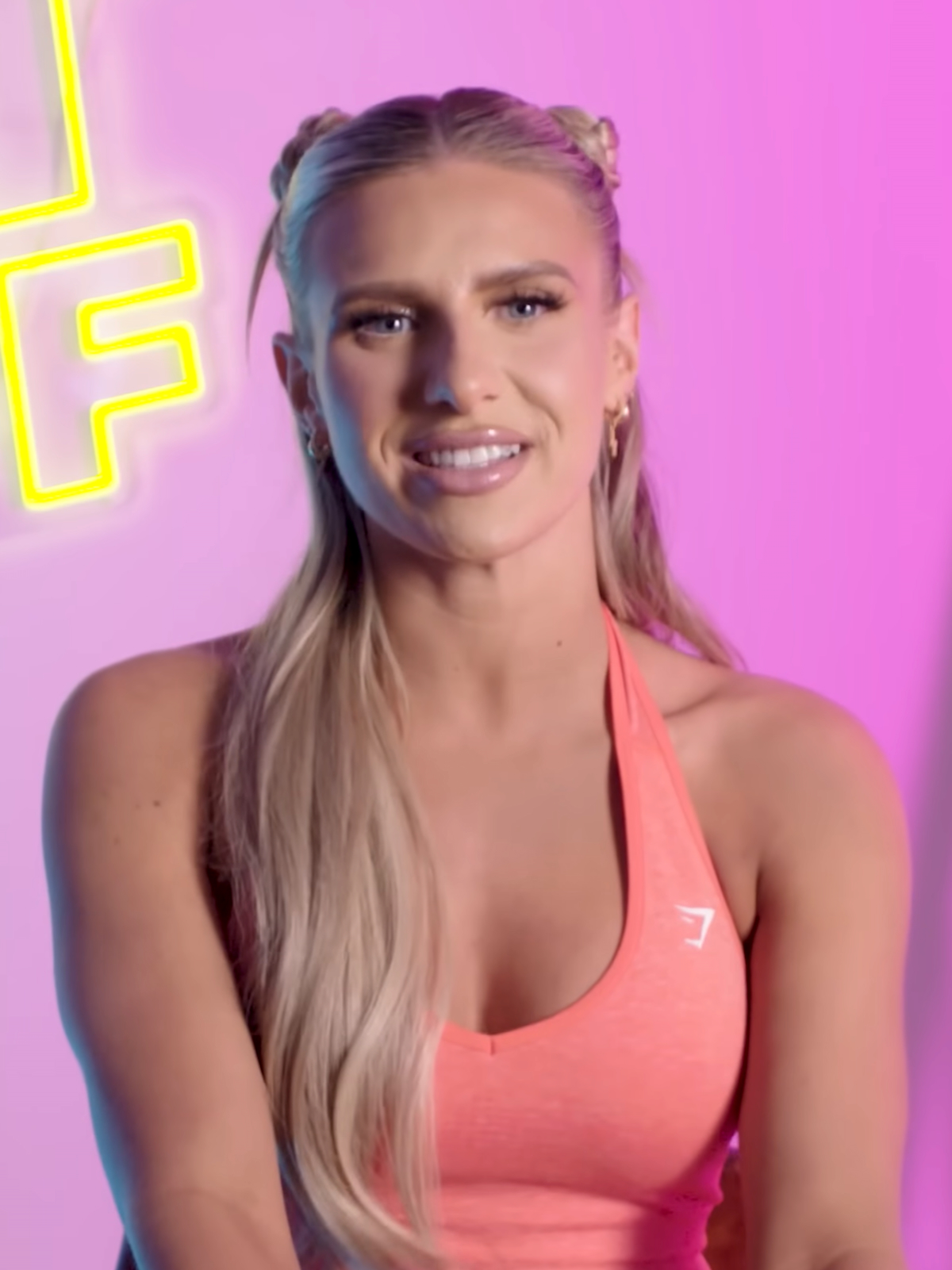
- Burrows in 2025
- Born: 26 September 1995 (age 31); Bicester, Oxfordshire, England
- Education: University of Liverpool (BA)
- Occupation: Television personality
- Television: Love Island; Scared of the Dark; Celebs Go Dating

YouTube information
- Channel: Chloe vs The World
- Genre: Podcast
- Subscribers: 145 thousand
- Views: 43 million
- Last updated: 12 July 2026

Chloe Burrows (born 26 September 1995) is an English television personality, known for being a contestant on the seventh series of Love Island in 2021. She has also appeared on Scared of the Dark, Celebs Go Dating and hosts her own podcast Chloe vs The World.

== Early and personal life ==
Burrows was born in Bicester, Oxfordshire, on 26 September 1995. Prior to appearing on television, she graduated with a marketing degree from the University of Liverpool, and subsequently worked as a marketing executive for a financial services company. Burrows was diagnosed with attention deficit hyperactivity disorder following her appearance on Love Island.

== Career ==
In 2021, Burrows became a contestant on the seventh series of Love Island. She entered the villa on day one as the first "bombshell" of the series. Burrows reached the final alongside Toby Aromolaran and the pair finished in second place. Burrows and Aromolaran went on to appear on an episode of Celebrity Catchpoint.

In 2022, Burrows was the reserve contestant for the ITV sporting reality show The Games; however, she did not get the opportunity to compete. She also appeared on an episode of Trainspotting with Francis Bourgeois. In 2023, Burrows appeared on the Channel 4 series Scared of the Dark, in which a group of celebrities lived in complete darkness for eight days. She appeared on the twelfth series of the E4 dating reality series Celebs Go Dating. In April 2023, Burrows began hosting her own podcast under The Fellas Studios, Chloe Vs The World, in which she interviews celebrity guests and discusses their experiences.

In July 2025, Burrows was named as part of the line-up for Celebrity SAS: Who Dares Wins. She voluntarily left the selection process early on, Episode 2, as screened on Channel 4.

In December 2025, Burrows was announced as the new co-presenter of the Kiss breakfast show alongside Tyler West, replacing Jordan Banjo and Perri Kiely. Their first show was broadcast on 2 February 2026.

In June 2026, Burrows was a contestant on the Prime Video reality series Would You Rather: Decide to Survive.

In November 2026, Burrows appeared as a contestant on the twenty-sixth series of I'm a Celebrity...Get Me Out of Here!.

== Filmography ==
As herself
Year	Title	Notes	Ref.
2021	Love Island	Contestant; series 7	
2022	Celebrity Catchpoint	Guest; 1 episode	
2022	Trainspotting with Francis Bourgeois	Guest; 1 episode	
2023	Scared of the Dark	Contestant	
2023	Celebs Go Dating	Cast member; series 12	
2024	Love in the limelight: Untold	Documentary	
2024	Inside	Joint winner; series 1	
2024	Celebrity Masterchef	Contestant; series 19	
2024	MAFS UK: It's Official! With Chloe Burrows	Presenter	
2025	Celebrity SAS: Who Dares Wins	Contestant	
2025	Big Brother: Late and Live	Regular panellist	
2026	Would You Rather: Decide to Survive	Contestant	
2026	I'm a Celebrity...Get Me Out of Here!	Contestant; series 26	
TBA	Bad Baby	Presenter	
