= Scared of the Dark (TV series) =

British reality television series

- Genre: Reality; Game show
- Presented by: Danny Dyer
- Country of origin: United Kingdom
- Original language: English
- No. of series: 1
- No. of episodes: 5

Production
- Executive producers: Simone Haywood; Jon Cahn; Glenn Hugill
- Camera setup: Multi-camera
- Running time: 59 minutes
- Production companies: Multistory Media; Possessed

Original release
- Network: Channel 4
- Release: 16 April – 20 April 2023

Scared of the Dark is a British reality television series broadcast on Channel 4. Presented by Danny Dyer, the series follows eight contestants as they live in complete darkness for eight days. The first series of five episodes aired over five consecutive nights from 16–20 April 2023.

== Format ==
Described as a "world first", eight celebrity contestants spend 180 hours (8 days) living, completing tasks, eating and sleeping in complete darkness in a specially built set.

Danny Dyer presented the show accompanied by clinical psychiatrist, Dr Tharaka Gunarathne, who monitored the contestants and analysed their activities.

In a way compared to the exit strategy of I'm a Celebrity...Get Me Out of Here!, the participants could shout "I'm scared of the dark" at any time, to leave a task, or the show.

In a nod to Big Brother's 'Diary Room', the celebrities could chat to a camera in a dimly lit room called 'The Vault'.

== Production ==
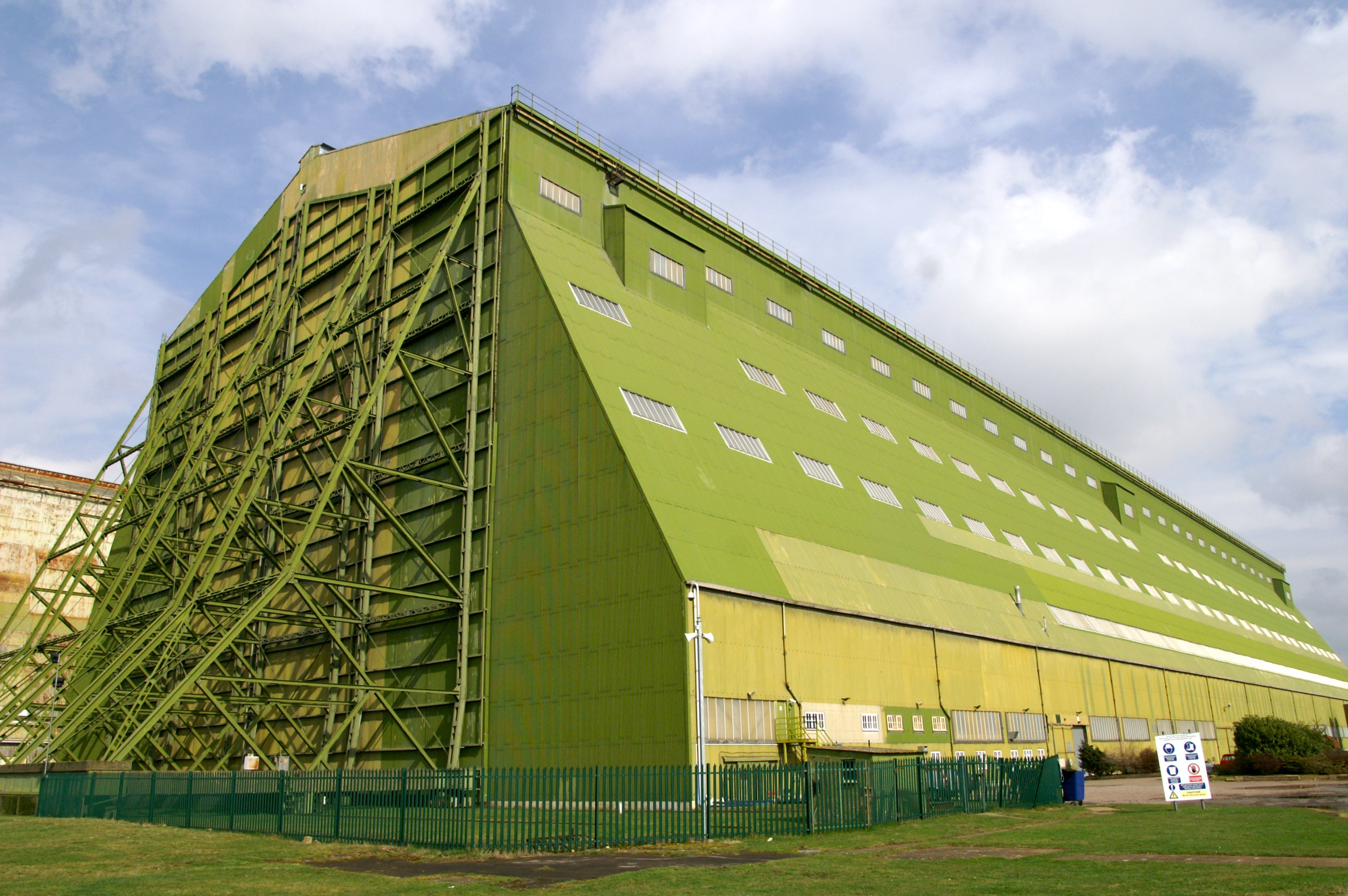
Airship hangar at Cardington Airfield

The show was recorded in September 2022, in a specially built set inside an airship hangar at Cardington Airfield, Bedfordshire. The hangar is owned by Cardington Studios and has been used as a set for other films and television shows.

Fifty infra red cameras were installed on the set to film the series.

Contestants underwent mental health screening prior to entering, were monitored by a mental health practitioner during the programme and were offered support afterwards.

== Contestants ==
Eight contestants entered the building:

Celebrity	Age on entry	Occupation			
Celebrity	Age on entry	Occupation	Nicola Adams	40	Former boxer
Chloe Burrows	27	Former Love Island contestant			
Chris Eubank	56	Former super-middleweight boxer			
Paul Gascoigne	55	Former England footballer			
Max George	34	Lead singer of The Wanted			
Chris McCausland	45	Comedian			
Scarlett Moffatt	32	Television personality, former Gogglebox star			
Donna Preston	36	Actor, writer and comedian			

Eubank left the show in episode 4, after having arguments with a number of the other participants and subsequently withdrawing from group activities.

Max George left the show two days before the end (broadcast on 20 April) after dwelling on the memories of his late bandmate, Tom Parker, and declaring "Being in the dark isn’t nice. I’m going to go home today and start fixing a few things".

The final episode on 20 April saw Paul Gascoigne declared winner of the series, following a vote by the remaining celebrities.

== Critical reception ==
The Guardian reviewer gave only 1 out of 5 stars for the opening programme, describing it as "Boring, derivative and occasionally downright horrible ...filled largely with stupid, boring challenges; contemptuous and derivative in the extreme".

The Independent reviewer gave 4 out of 5 stars for the programme, though bemoaned that the tasks distracted from the interpersonal dynamics and the "psychological torture of being locked in a room with Chris Eubank". The reviewer thought "Channel 4 may just have stumbled on a winning formula".
