= Isle of Wight Festival 2012 =

Music festival on the Isle of Wight, England

- Genre: Rock, alternative rock
- Dates: 21–24 June 2012
- Locations: Seaclose Park, Isle of Wight, England
- Website: www.isleofwightfestival.com

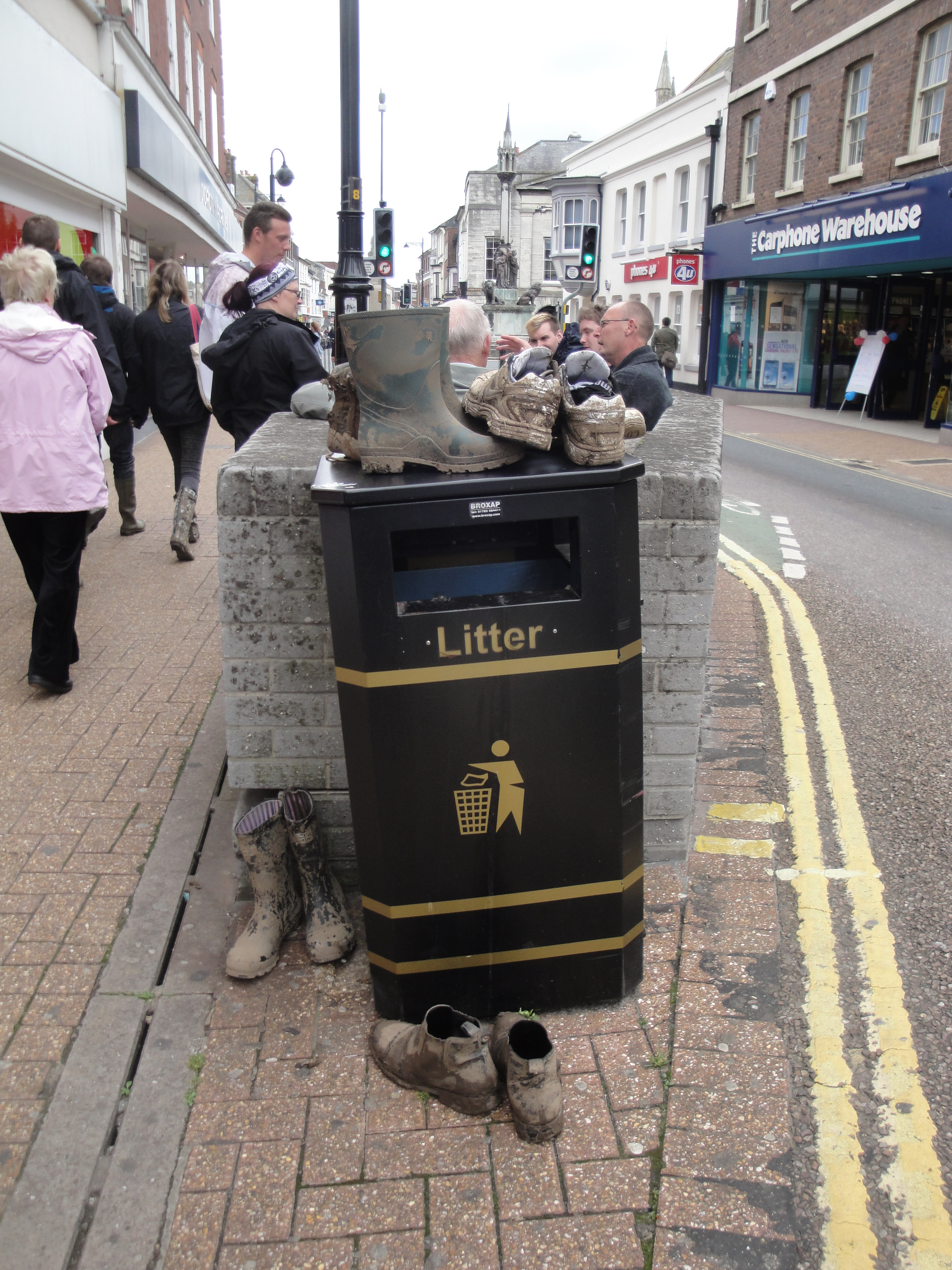
Due to heavy rain, the ground at the Isle of Wight Festival 2012 became waterlogged and muddy. Some festival patrons chose to abandon their shoes and try to continue barefoot (As they did at this High Street bin)

The Isle of Wight Festival 2012 was the eleventh revived Isle of Wight Festival, held at Seaclose Park in Newport on the Isle of Wight. The event ran from 21 to 24 June 2012.

The 2012 event was the second under a ten-year deal between the Isle of Wight Council and the promoters Solos. Dubbed the "American Trilogy" by festival organiser John Giddings, it was headlined by Tom Petty and the Heartbreakers, Pearl Jam and Bruce Springsteen & The E Street Band.

Overnight heavy rain on 21 and 22 June waterlogged the event ground and cars driving on it turned it into a mudbath and had to be towed out by a tractor, resulting in visiting fans' cars waiting to be allowed in backing up the roads all the way back to the ferry dock.

== Line up ==
=== Main Stage ===
Friday

- Tom Petty and The Heartbreakers
- Elbow
- Example
- Noah & the Whale
- Feeder

Saturday

- Pearl Jam
- Biffy Clyro
- Tinie Tempah
- Jessie J
- Madness
- Labrinth
- Big Country
- James Walsh
- Signals

Sunday

- Bruce Springsteen & The E Street Band
- Noel Gallagher's High Flying Birds
- The Vaccines
- Band of Skulls
- Joan Armatrading
- Steve Hackett
- The Minutes
- Naked Fridays

=== Big Top ===
Thursday

- Primal Scream
- The Stranglers
- Penguin Prison

Friday

- Groove Armada
- Enter Shikari
- DJ Fresh Presents FRESH/LIVE
- Lana Del Rey
- Kelis
- Caro Emerald

Saturday

- Magnetic Man
- Professor Green
- Wretch 32
- Katy B
- Loick Essien
- Stooshe
- Clement Marfo & The Frontline
- Hue and Cry
- Boyce Avenue
- The Brilliant Things

Sunday

- The Darkness
- Ash
- Pulled Apart By Horses
- Black Stone Cherry
- The Virgin Marys
- Spector
- Zulu Winter
- The Milk
- Switchfoot

=== Garden Stage ===
Thursday

- Brit Floyd: The Pink Floyd Tribute Show
- Howard Jones
- Stackridge
- Cerys Matthews
- Tensheds

Friday

- Crystal Castles
- Best Coast
- Dry the River
- Gretchen Peters
- Pronghorn
- Boy Genius

Saturday

- The Charlatans
- Miles Kane
- X
- Thunderclap Newman
- Andrew Roachford
- Sadie and the Hot Heads
- The Christians
- Terry Reid
- Tobi (special guest Andy Fraser)
- The Real D'Coy
- Sofia

Sunday

- The Pierces
- Christina Perri
- Melanie C
- Beth Hart
- Suzanne Vega
- James Walsh
- Matt Cardle
- Fallulah
- Molly McQueen
