= Baller League =

Indoor six-a-side football competition

- Founded: 2024
- Country: Germany; United Kingdom; United States
- Number of clubs: 12 (Germany, UK); 10 (USA)
- Broadcasters: YouTube; Twitch; United Kingdom: NOW TV; United States: CBS Sports
- Website: Baller League GER; Baller League UK; Baller League USA

The Baller League is an indoor six-a-side football competition that originated in Germany in 2024, created by entrepreneur Felix Starck, with backing from professional footballers Mats Hummels and Lukas Podolski. The league combines professional football elements with entertainment, incorporating celebrities, influencers, and ex-professional footballers as managers and players. Following the success of the German edition, the league expanded to the United Kingdom in March 2025 and to the United States in March 2026.

== History ==
The Baller League was launched in 2024 in Germany, inspired by the success of the Kings League in Spain. It was conceptualized to merge traditional football with elements of entertainment to appeal to a younger demographic.

Following the German edition's success, major expansions were announced in November 2024, with new editions set to launch in the United Kingdom and the United States in 2025. British YouTuber KSI was named president of the UK edition, while American livestreamer IShowSpeed was appointed president of the US edition. The inaugural UK edition began on 24 March 2025 at London's Copper Box Arena. In September 2025, Baller League USA was formally announced, with the first season to be held in Miami, Florida, initially slated to launch in January 2026 at a purpose-built arena in Tropical Park. The US league would later be delayed to March 2026. Baller League would put its German operations on pause in January 2026 in order to focus on the UK, USA and other potential markets.

== Format ==
The league follows a six-a-side format with 12 teams, each consisting of a 12-player squad selected through a draft system. Matches last 30 minutes, divided into two 15-minute halves. The league also incorporates several unique rules:

- Gamechanger: Each team has the opportunity to introduce a "Gamechanger" card before kickoff, allowing the implementation of special in-game modifications.
- Rule twists: Rule twists will be introduced during the final three minutes of each half, including three v three, long-range goals counting as double and goalkeepers not allowed to use their hands.
- Wildcards: Managers also get two wildcards per game week, which means they can bring anyone to feature in their team for that match.
- Corners: There are no corners - instead, if the ball goes off an opposing player and behind the goal three times, a penalty is given.
- Penalty: If a penalty is awarded, a player will do a MLS-style one v one penalties against the goalkeeper with only six seconds on the clock to try and score.
- White flag: Managers can throw in a white flag to challenge a refereeing decision.

The top four teams in the league will qualify for the play-offs, known as the Final Four in Baller League UK and Germany and the Finals in Baller League USA, with two semi-finals and a final to decide a champion.

== Baller League Germany ==
=== Teams and managers ===
The German Baller League included 12 teams, each managed by a notable figure from sports, entertainment, and social media. The teams and managers from the season 3 were as follows.

Team	Manager(s)
Beton Berlin	(Germany) Kontra K
Calcio Berlin	(Germany) Nico Heymer, (Germany) Niklas Levinsohn and (Germany) Christoph Kröger
Eintracht Spandau	(Germany) Hans Sarpei and (Germany) HandOfBlood
FC Nitro	(Germany) Nader Jindaoui
Golden XI	(Germany) Florian Neuhaus and (Germany) Christoph Kramer
Gönrgy Allstars	(Germany) MontanaBlack and (Germany) Sascha Hellinger
Hollywood United	(Germany) Max Kruse and (Germany) Jens Knossalla
Käfigtiger	(Ghana) Kevin-Prince Boateng and (Austria) Abdi Rackzman
Las Ligas Ladies	(Croatia) Ana Maria Marković, (Germany) Selina Cerci and (Germany) Jule Brand
Protatos	(Germany) Lars Holzschneider and (Germany) Lukas Kutting
Streets United	(Germany) Lukas Podolski and (Germany) Diyar Acar
VFR Zimbos	(Germany) GamerBrother and (Germany) Tisi Schubech

In previous seasons, the following managers were also involved: Alisha Lehmann (later co-manager of MVPs United in Baller League UK), Felix Lobrecht, Abdi Rackzman and Trymacs (as his team, Hardstuck Royale, quit after the first Baller League Germany season; Trymacs later moved to Kings League Germany). Marco Reus was to also manage a team for Season 4 prior to Baller League Germany's pause.

=== Results ===
Season	Final Four venue	Final			Semi-finalists	Ref
Season	Final Four venue	Winners	Score	Runners-up	Semi-finalists	Ref
1 (2024)	PSD Bank Dome, Berlin	Streets United	7–5	Calcio Berlin	Las Ligas Ladies and Eintracht Spandau	
2 (2024)	PSD Bank Dome, Berlin	Las Ligas Ladies	4–3	Gönrgy Allstars	Beton Berlin and FC Nitro	
3 (2025)	Hangar 7 (Berlin Tempelhof Airport), Berlin	Streets United	7–1	Gönrgy Allstars	Calcio Berlin and Hollywood United	

== Baller League UK ==
=== Teams and managers ===
Baller League UK includes 12 teams, each managed by a notable figure from sports, entertainment, and social media. The teams and managers are as follows.

Team	Manager(s)
Clutch FC	(England) Chloe Kelly
Deportrio	(England) Micah Richards
NDL FC	(England) Niko Omilana
Gold Devils	(England) Mark Goldbridge and (England) Spencer Owen
SDS FC	(England) Sharky
N5 FC	(Germany) Jens Lehmann
Prime FC	(England) KSI
VZN FC	(England) TBJZL
Wembley Rangers AFC	(England) Steve Bracknall
P17 FC	(Nigeria) Alex Iwobi
RTG FC	(England) Danny Aarons
Toma FC	(Nigeria) Jay-Jay Okocha

=== Former teams ===
Team	Manager(s)	Season(s)
26ers	(England) John Terry	1 and 2 (2025–26)
Community FC (Note: Community FC was the official name given by the league, however they entered the league via the Baller League Community Cup under the name "Pathetico Madrid".)	N/A (Note: Officially listed during the club's announcement and on the Baller League UK website as "TBC".)	3 (2026)
FC Rules the World	(England) Clint 419	1 (2025)
M7 FC	(England) Miniminter	1 and 2 (2025–26)
MVPs United	(Switzerland) Alisha Lehmann and (England) Maya Jama	1 and 2 (2025–26)
Santan FC	(England) Dave	1 (2025)
Trebol FC	(Portugal) Luís Figo	1 (2025)
Yanited	(England) Angryginge	1–3 (2025–26)
Rukkas FC	(England) Idris Elba	2 and 3 (2025-26)

=== Results ===
Season	Final Four venue	Final			Semi-finalists	Ref
Season	Final Four venue	Winners	Score	Runners-up	Semi-finalists	Ref
1 (2025)	The O2 Arena, London	SDS FC	4–3	MVPs United	Deportrio and Yanited	
2 (2025–26)	Copper Box Arena, London	Wembley Rangers AFC	4–3	SDS FC	M7 FC and NDL FC	
3 (2026)	The O2 Arena, London	Prime FC	5–2	NDL FC	SDS FC and Deportrio	
4 (2026)	AO Arena, Manchester	N/A	N/A	N/A	N/A	

== Baller League USA ==
Baller League USA consists of 10 teams managed by a notable figures from sports, entertainment, and social media. The first eight sets of managers were announced on September 16, 2025. On December 10, 2025, Westcol was announced as a manager; he had previously been in Kings League Americas as co-chairman of West Santos FC.

=== Teams and managers ===
Team	Manager(s)
876 United	(Jamaica) Usain Bolt
Any Means United	(United States) AMP (Kai Cenat, ImDavisss, Duke Dennis, Fanum, Agent 00 and Chrisnxtdoor)
Club 360	(United States) Druski
For The Win FC	(Colombia) Westcol and (Puerto Rico) Arcángel
Glitch FC	(Canada) xQc
M3 FC	(Sweden) Marlon
Midnight Wizards	(Brazil) Ronaldinho
Showtime FC	(United States) Odell Beckham Jr.
Speed United	(United States) IShowSpeed
Super Niños FC	(Colombia) J Balvin and (United States) KidSuper

=== Results ===
Season	Finals venue	Final			Semi-finalists	Ref
Season	Finals venue	Winners	Score	Runners-up	Semi-finalists	Ref
1 (2026)	Tropical Park, Miami	Super Niños FC	6–2	Club 360	Speed United and Midnight Wizards	

== Reception ==
The league has been praised for its innovative approach to football and for engaging younger audiences through its combination of entertainment and sport. Its introduction to the UK market has further expanded its global reach and popularity.

== See also ==
- Kings League – Spanish counterpart that influenced the Baller League
- The Icon League – German five-a-side league
