= Corteiz =

British streetwear brand

- Corteiz Alcatraz logo and slogan
- Product type: Apparel
- Current owner: Clint "Clint 419" Ogbenna
- Country: United Kingdom
- Introduced: 2017
- Markets: Clothing, Fashion, Streetwear,
- Tagline: Rules The World
- Website: www.corteiz.com

Corteiz or Corteiz Rules The World (CRTZRTW) is a London-based streetwear brand founded in 2017 by British-Nigerian entrepreneur Clint Ogbenna, professionally known as Clint 419. The brand's logo features a silhouette of Alcatraz Island, and its clothing often carries the tagline "Rules The World".

== History ==
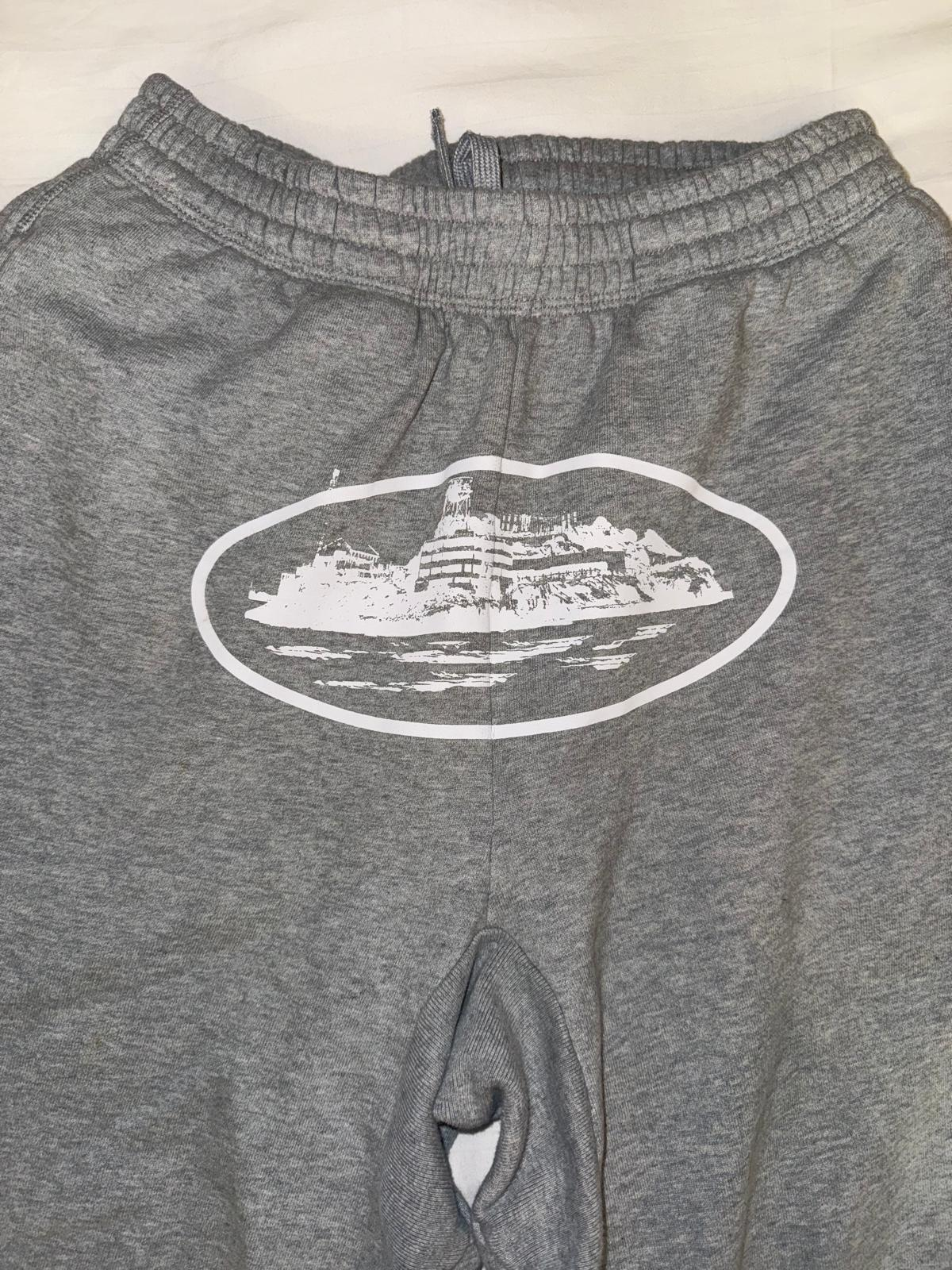
Alcatraz logo seen on a pair of tracksuit bottoms

Corteiz was founded in 2017, launching with a limited collection of screen-printed T-shirts and crewnecks featuring the Alcatraz logo. The logo symbolises the brand’s core message of rebellion against convention. The brand has since expanded its product range to include tracksuits, footwear, and bags. Corteiz maintains an Instagram account and a website that is accessible only via a password released with each product drop.

== Marketing ==
Corteiz is known for its use of guerrilla marketing strategies. In 2021, the brand launched a T-shirt in Soho, where customers could exchange their metro tickets for the limited item. In 2022, the brand launched the “Da Great Bolo Exchange”. Through Twitter (now X), Clint invited customers to swap their jackets for the new Corteiz Bolo jacket, with the collected garments later donated to the homeless.

That same year, Corteiz held the “99p Market Stall” pop-up, selling new cargo trousers for 99 pence. Customers were required to pay exactly 99p, with no change given. Over two thousand people attended the event.

In 2024, Corteiz hosted the “Da Great Denim Exchange” in New York, inviting customers to trade in jeans from any brand for a pair of Corteiz denim. Only 250 pieces were available.

== Nike lawsuit ==
In 2021, Nike filed a lawsuit against Corteiz and Clint, alleging that the brand’s name was too similar to the Nike Cortez shoe. Clint was ordered to pay £1,850. In 2023, however, the two brands collaborated on a shoe release.

== Collaborations ==
In 2023, Corteiz collaborated with Nike to release the Nike Air Max 95 in three colourways: Gutta Green, Pink Beam, and Aegean Storm. Each was released exclusively in London, New York, and Paris. A fourth colour, Honey Black, was released in 2025.

In 2023, Corteiz partnered with streetwear brand Supreme to launch a collection of T-shirts and hoodies.

== Awards and nominations ==
Corteiz was nominated for the 2023 Fashion Awards in the “New Establishment – Menswear” category.

== Reception ==
Corteiz has been praised for its innovative marketing, denouncement of fashion giants and rebellion against traditional fashion. The brand's secretive approach to drops, such as password protected websites, has since become popular amongst other streetwear brands.
