= Baddeley Edge =

Hamlet in Staffordshire, England

Coordinates: 53.04°N 02.13°W

- Location within Staffordshire
- OS grid reference: SJ9150
- District: Stoke-on-Trent
- Shire county: Staffordshire
- Region: West Midlands
- Country: England
- Sovereign state: United Kingdom
- Post town: Stoke-on-Trent
- Postcode district: ST2
- Police: Staffordshire
- Fire: Staffordshire
- Ambulance: West Midlands
- UK Parliament: Stoke-on-Trent

Baddeley Edge is a hamlet in the north of the city of Stoke-on-Trent, in the north of the county of Staffordshire.

== Electoral Boundaries ==
It was formerly part of the Leek Rural District. Today Baddeley Edge is part of the Abbey Green local Council ward, which covers the areas of Baddeley Green and Milton, Abbey Hulton and Light Oaks. At 2023 the wider Parliamentary boundaries are set to change, and at the next General Election Baddeley Edge will join the Stoke-on-Trent North constituency. In a wider regional context, Baddeley Edge is part of the West Midlands, and is not to be considered to be in 'the north' of England.

== History ==
It is recorded in the 13th Century as Beddeleye which probably reflects its pronunciation at that time. The area just to the north was once known for its stone quarries, from which the local 'Chatsworth' variety of hard Millstone Grit was extracted.

The place was the last home of John Bradshawe, the man who - as President of the High Court - had condemned King Charles I to death in 1649.

Jewitt's book The Wedgwoods (1865) refers to the early 17th century Burslem pottery works and reveals the role played in these by Baddeley Edge... "The clays it appears, were mostly procured from the coal measures, and fine sand to mix and temper them was procured from Baddeley Edge, Mole Cop [Mow Cop] and other places." Solon (1875) is more specific... "[Around 1710-20 in nearby Burslem] potters began to make a fire-resisting body which could stand the required temperature, by mixing the whitish clay found at Shelton with the fine sand of Baddeley Edge". The result was a fine stoneware which 'made the name' of the Burslem potteries, and thus laid a foundation for the Industrial Revolution.

The place was home to another kind of revolution. Located in the hamlet and still standing today is a Primitive Methodist Chapel which was built in 1874, when the moorland district around Mow Cop was a hot-bed of Primitive Methodism.

There was some commercial coal working in the 19th century, in a small way, under shale seams at what is now Greenway Hall. In the roof of the 'Muck Row' coal seam there, Victorian antiquarians found fossils of prehistoric sharks (Diplodus gibbosus) that swam some 300 million years ago.

In the 19th century the place was sometimes recorded as "Badderley Edge", with an 'r' in the name.

== Green spaces ==
The geological feature of the 'Edge'... "reaches 787 feet at its highest point" and its quarry faces and outcrops of stone are noted in many geological gazetteers and guides.

Today, on the south-western side of Baddeley Edge one can find the Bagnall Road Wood Nature Reserve, with the large green Carmountside Cemetery beyond. Carmountside and the old medieval Abbey at Hulton were once considered part of the Baddeley Edge area. Just to the north of the hamlet of Baddeley Edge is the popular Greenway Hall golf course (est. 1909) and various footpaths across open fields.

A number of off-road public footpaths also connect the various surrounding green spaces a little further away. For instance it is a short walk south on footpaths to the very large Wetley Moor Common which is an important national nature reserve. Or a short walk north along the Edge will bring the walker to the popular Caldon Canal and its towpath, at Stockton Brook. This canal towpath, also accessible by side roads, forms part of the National Cycle Network NCN 550 path - which offers pleasant cycling access (5 miles) to Stoke-on-Trent's mainline train station and thus to frequent inter-city train connections to Birmingham, Manchester and London.
