= Soccer Aid =

English annual charity football event

- Genre: Charity event
- Created by: Robbie Williams; Jonathan Wilkes
- Presented by: Ant & Dec (2006–08); Dermot O'Leary (2010–present); Kirsty Gallacher (2010–2020); Alex Scott (2021–present); Backstage: Cat Deeley (2012–2014); Regular Pundit: Maya Jama (2020–2023); Extra Time: Sara Cox (2006); Dave Berry (2010–2012); Jermaine Jenas (2023); Joelah Noble (2023); Alex Scott and Dermot O'Leary (2025)
- Starring: Guest Panellists; Vicky McClure; Jason Manford; Jermaine Jenas
- Country of origin: England
- Original language: English
- No. of series: 13 editions
- No. of episodes: 16

Production
- Running time: 210–220 minutes (inc. adverts)
- Production company: Initial

Original release
- Network: ITV; Virgin Media Sport
- Release: 22 May 2006 – present

Soccer Aid
- Sport: Association football
- Type: Friendly match
- Location: London and Manchester , England
- Teams: England; World XI (formerly Rest of the World)
- First meeting: England 2–1 Rest of the World (3 June 2006; 20 years ago)
- Latest meeting: England 3–2 World XI (31 May 2026; 5 months ago)
- Broadcasters: ITV
- Stadiums: Old Trafford, Greater Manchester (2006, 2010–18, 2020, 2023, 2025) Wembley Stadium, London (2008) Stamford Bridge, Fulham, London (2019, 2024) City of Manchester Stadium, Manchester (2021) London Stadium (2022, 2026)

Statistics
- Total meetings: 15
- Most wins: World XI (8)
- Most player appearances: Paddy McGuinness (9)
- Top scorer: Jermain Defoe (9)
- All-time record: World XI: 8; England: 7
- Largest goal scoring: 9 goals (9 June 2024)
- Longest win streak: World XI, 5 (2019–2023)
- Current win streak: England, 1 (2026)

Soccer Aid is an English annual charity event that has raised over £137 million in aid of UNICEF UK, through ticket sales and donations from the public. The televised event is an exhibition-style football match between two teams, England and the Soccer Aid World XI (formerly Rest of the World (ROW) until 2018), composed of celebrities and former professional players representing their countries. It is the only mixed-sex match officially sanctioned by The Football Association.

== Event details ==
Soccer Aid was initiated in 2006 by Robbie Williams and Jonathan Wilkes. It initially took place every two years. Since the 2018 edition, it has been held annually. The television broadcast is produced by Initial and distributed by Endemol Shine Sport, a Dutch company that distributes Dutch Eredivisie coverage. Television coverage began on ITV on 22 May 2006 in a show presented by Ant & Dec. Dermot O'Leary took over as main presenter in 2010.

The ROW/World XI team narrowly leads the head-to-head, with eight wins to the England team's seven.

On 16 June 2019, the fixture was the first to include female players as part of the squads. On 6 September 2020, the match was played behind closed doors due to the COVID-19 pandemic.

Edition	Year	Winners	Score	Runners–up	Venue	Attendance
1	2006	England	2–1	Rest of the World	Old Trafford, Manchester	71,960
2	2008	England (2)	4–3	Rest of the World	Wembley Stadium, London	45,000
3	2010	Rest of the World	2–2 (7–6 p)	England	Old Trafford, Manchester	65,493
4	2012	England (3)	3–1	Rest of the World	Old Trafford, Manchester	67,346
5	2014	Rest of the World (2)	4–2	England	Old Trafford, Manchester	65,574
6	2016	England (4)	3–2	Rest of the World	Old Trafford, Manchester	70,000
7	2018	England (5)	3–3 (4–3 p)	World XI	Old Trafford, Manchester	71,965
8	2019	World XI (3)	2–2 (3–1 p)	England	Stamford Bridge, London	39,836
9	2020	World XI (4)	1–1 (4–3 p)	England	Old Trafford, Manchester	0 (Note: Match was played behind closed doors due to the COVID-19 pandemic.)
10	2021	World XI (5)	3–0	England	Etihad Stadium, Manchester	51,674
11	2022	World XI (6)	2–2 (4–1 p)	England	London Stadium, London	54,410
12	2023	World XI (7)	4–2	England	Old Trafford, Manchester	74,000
13	2024	England (6)	6–3	World XI	Stamford Bridge, London	40,000
14	2025	World XI (8)	5–4	England	Old Trafford, Manchester	74,000
15	2026	England (7)	3–2	World XI	London Stadium, London	

== Soccer Aid 2006 ==
2006 Soccer Aid
Tournament details
- Host country: England
- Dates: 22 – 27 May
- Venues: 2

Final positions
- Champions: England (1st title)
- Runners-up: Rest of the World

Tournament statistics
- Matches played: 4
- Goals scored: 14 (3.5 per match)
- Attendance: 71,960 (17,990 per match)

Soccer Aid 2006 was held between 22–27 May 2006, and broadcast in the UK on ITV.

=== Event schedule ===
- 22 May 2006 – Start of the television coverage, presented by Ant and Dec. Rest of the World defeats England in a penalty shoot-out
- 23 May 2006 – Practice match: England 1–0 England Legends (Craven Cottage, London)
- 24 May 2006 – Practice match: Rest of the World 3–7 Scotland Legends (Craven Cottage, London)
- 25 May 2006 – Rest of the World defeats England in a Football Quiz
- 26 May 2006 – Coaches name starting line-ups for the match
- 27 May 2006 – Soccer Aid Match: England 2–1 Rest of the World (Old Trafford, Manchester), attendance 71,960

The practice matches were played over 60 minutes, with the Soccer Aid match played over 90 minutes.

The competition was organised on behalf of UNICEF UK with profits from the matches, along with donations and sponsorship, donated to UNICEF programs in Africa, Asia and the Americas.

England beat the Rest of the World 2–1. Goals from Les Ferdinand and Jonathan Wilkes put England into a two-goal lead but a handball inside the area from David Gray resulted in a penalty, converted by Diego Maradona. Wilkes won the Man of the Match award.

=== England squad ===
The England squad was managed by former England national football team manager Terry Venables, assisted by David Geddis and Ted Buxton. The original squad comprised 16 players, with Bryan Robson added later. A handful of the players, notably Angus Deayton, had previous celebrity international experience from the previous month's England v Germany: The Legends match in Reading, which Germany won 4–2. The England squad went into the match with no major injury worries. Their victory over a squad of ex-England internationals from the 1960s to 1990s on Tuesday morning was tempered with defeats to the Rest of the World in a penalty shootout and football quiz.

Celebrities

- Robbie Williams (captain)
- David Gray
- Jamie Theakston
- Bradley Walsh
- Jonathan Wilkes
- Ben Shephard
- Ronnie O'Sullivan
- Damian Lewis
- Angus Deayton
- Dean Lennox Kelly

Legends

- David Seaman
- Tony Adams
- Paul Gascoigne
- Jamie Redknapp
- Les Ferdinand
- John Barnes
- Bryan Robson
- Graeme Le Saux

Coaching Staff

- Manager: Terry Venables
- Assistant manager: David Geddis
- Coach: Ted Buxton

=== Rest of the World squad ===
The Rest of the World squad was managed by Ruud Gullit, with Gus Poyet as his assistant. Captain Gordon Ramsay injured his leg in the early training sessions and was considered doubtful for the match. The original squad of 16 players, which later saw 2 changes, was supplemented by the addition of Diego Maradona during the build-up to the competition. Lothar Matthäus had appeared in the England v Germany: The Legends match the previous month.

The Rest of the World squad was wracked by injuries and withdrawals, and suffered from a lack of players. Desailly, Matthäus, Schmeichel and Ginola all arrived with only 2 or 3 days to spare before the match; Ginola arrived during half time of their warm-up defeat to the Scotland Legends on Wednesday afternoon, and Diego Maradona only joined the squad on the day before the match.

Also, Craig Doyle and Brian McFadden went into the match carrying knocks, which led to management members Ruud Gullit and Gus Poyet coming on as substitutes on Wednesday and in the match itself.

Celebrities

- Gordon Ramsay (captain)
- David Campese
- Patrick Kielty
- Eddie Irvine (withdrew and was replaced by Gareth Thomas)
- Gareth Thomas (replacement for Eddie Irvine)
- Ben Johnson
- Sergei Fedorov
- Brian McFadden
- Alastair Campbell
- Craig Doyle
- Alessandro Nivola
- Michael Greco

Legends

- Gianfranco Zola
- Marcel Desailly
- David Ginola
- Dunga
- Lothar Matthäus
- Peter Schmeichel
- Diego Maradona

Coaching Staff

- Player/Manager: Ruud Gullit
- Player/Assistant Manager: Gus Poyet

Other notable participants
The match was refereed by Pierluigi Collina, the Italian referee considered by many fans as the best referee of all time.

=== The match ===
27 May 2006
19:45 BST

England	2–1	Rest of the World
Ferdinand 14'; Wilkes 20'	Report	Maradona 75' (pen.)

Old Trafford, Manchester
Attendance: 71,960
Referee: Pierluigi Collina

GK	David Seaman	(substituted off) 45'
	David Gray
	Tony Adams
	Ben Shephard
	Robbie Williams (c)	(substituted off) 85'
	Damian Lewis
	Paul Gascoigne	(substituted off) 55'
	Jonathan Wilkes
	Bradley Walsh	(substituted off) 55'
	Les Ferdinand	(substituted off) 52'
	Dean Lennox Kelly	(substituted off) 64'
Substitutes:
GK	Jamie Theakston	(substituted on) 45'
	John Barnes	(substituted on) 85'
	Graeme Le Saux	(substituted on) 55'
	Jamie Redknapp	(substituted on) 55'
	Angus Deayton	(substituted on) 52'
	Bryan Robson	(substituted on) 64'
Manager:
Terry Venables

GK
Substitutes:
GK
Manager:
Ruud Gullit

Peter Schmeichel
Craig Doyle
Marcel Desailly
Lothar Matthäus
Michael Greco
Brian McFadden
Alastair Campbell
Alessandro Nivola
Sergei Fedorov
Gordon Ramsay
Diego Maradona
Patrick Kielty
Ben Johnson
Dunga
Gareth Thomas
David Ginola
Ruud Gullit
Gianfranco Zola
Gus Poyet

(substituted off) 45'
(substituted off) 45'
(substituted off) 45'
(substituted off) 8'
(substituted off) 45'
(substituted off) 11'
(substituted on) 45'
(substituted on) 45'
(substituted on) 45'	(substituted off) 73'
(substituted on) 8'
(substituted on) 45'	(substituted off) 55'
(substituted on) 55'
(substituted on) 11'
(substituted on) 73'

== Soccer Aid 2008 ==
2008 Soccer Aid
Tournament details
- Host country: England
- Dates: 7 September
- Venue: 1

Final positions
- Champions: England (2nd title)
- Runners-up: Rest of the World

Tournament statistics
- Matches played: 1
- Goals scored: 7 (7 per match)
- Attendance: 45,000 (45,000 per match)
- Top scorer(s): Alan Shearer (2 goals); Paolo Di Canio (2 goals)

Soccer Aid 2008 was played on 7 September 2008. It was broadcast in the United Kingdom on ITV and presented by Ant & Dec. Before kick-off Jonathan Ansell sang the footballing anthem "Nessun Dorma", whilst the players were introduced to Geoff Hurst.

The referee at the start of the match was Pierluigi Collina, who also refereed the previous match in 2006 and is regarded as the best referee of all time. However, after Collina was injured in the first half he was replaced by Scottish referee Hugh Dallas. The process of two professional referees overseeing one half of the match each has since been maintained in subsequent series.

=== England squad ===
The England squad was coached by Harry Redknapp, with Bryan Robson as his assistant manager.

Celebrities

- Ben Shephard
- Jamie Theakston
- Kyran Bracken
- Jonathan Wilkes
- Gareth Gates
- Tom Felton
- Danny Jones
- Craig David
- Chris Fountain
- Angus Deayton
- Hugo Speer

Legends

- Alan Shearer
- Jamie Redknapp
- Teddy Sheringham
- David Seaman
- Graeme Le Saux
- Des Walker

=== Rest of the World squad ===
The Rest of the World squad was coached by Kenny Dalglish, with Ian Rush as player-assistant manager.

Celebrities

- Gordon Ramsay
- Brian Lara
- Nicky Byrne
- Kenny Logan
- Patrick Kielty
- Alastair Campbell
- Gethin Jones
- Rodrigo Santoro
- Santiago Cabrera
- Gilles Marini
- Brian McFadden
- Jesse Metcalfe (withdrawn)

Legends

- Franco Baresi
- Jaap Stam
- Paolo Di Canio
- Romário
- Luís Figo
- Cláudio Taffarel (replacement for Peter Schmeichel)
- Ian Rush
- Peter Schmeichel (withdrew and was replaced by Cláudio Taffarel)

=== The match ===
7 September 2008
19:30 BST

England	4–3	Rest of the World
Sheringham 9'; Shearer 45+1' (pen.), 62'; Wilkes 81'	Report	Di Canio 14', 47'; Marini 43'

Wembley Stadium, London
Attendance: 45,000
Referee: Pierluigi Collina (Hugh Dallas 45')

GK	David Seaman	(substituted off) 45'
DF	Angus Deayton	(substituted off) 43'
DF	Des Walker	(substituted off) 15'
DF	Ben Shephard
DF	Chris Fountain	(substituted off) 45'
MF	Danny Jones
MF	Jonathan Wilkes (c)
MF	Jamie Redknapp
MF	Craig David	(substituted off) 45'	(substituted on) 74'
FW	Alan Shearer
FW	Teddy Sheringham
Substitutes:
GK	Jamie Theakston	(substituted on) 45'
DF	Graeme Le Saux	(substituted on) 15'
	Kyran Bracken	(substituted on) 43'
	Gareth Gates	(substituted on) 45'	(substituted off) 81'
	Hugo Speer	(substituted on) 45'	(substituted off) 74'
	Tom Felton	(substituted on) 81'
Manager:
Harry Redknapp

GK	Cláudio Taffarel	(substituted off) 45'
DF	Gethin Jones
DF	Jaap Stam (c)
DF	Gordon Ramsay	(substituted off) 9'
DF	Santiago Cabrera
MF	Paolo Di Canio
MF	Luís Figo	(substituted off) 45'
MF	Kenny Logan	(substituted off) 65'
MF	Nicky Byrne
FW	Gilles Marini	(substituted off) 60'
FW	Romário	(substituted off) 81'
Substitutes:
GK	Patrick Kielty	(substituted on) 45'
	Brian Lara	(substituted on) 9'
	Franco Baresi	(substituted on) 45'	(substituted off) 81'
	Bryan McFadden	(substituted on) 65'
	Rodrigo Santoro	(substituted on) 60'
	Ian Rush	(substituted on) 81'
	Alastair Campbell	(substituted on) 81'
Manager:
Kenny Dalglish

== Soccer Aid 2010 ==
2010 Soccer Aid
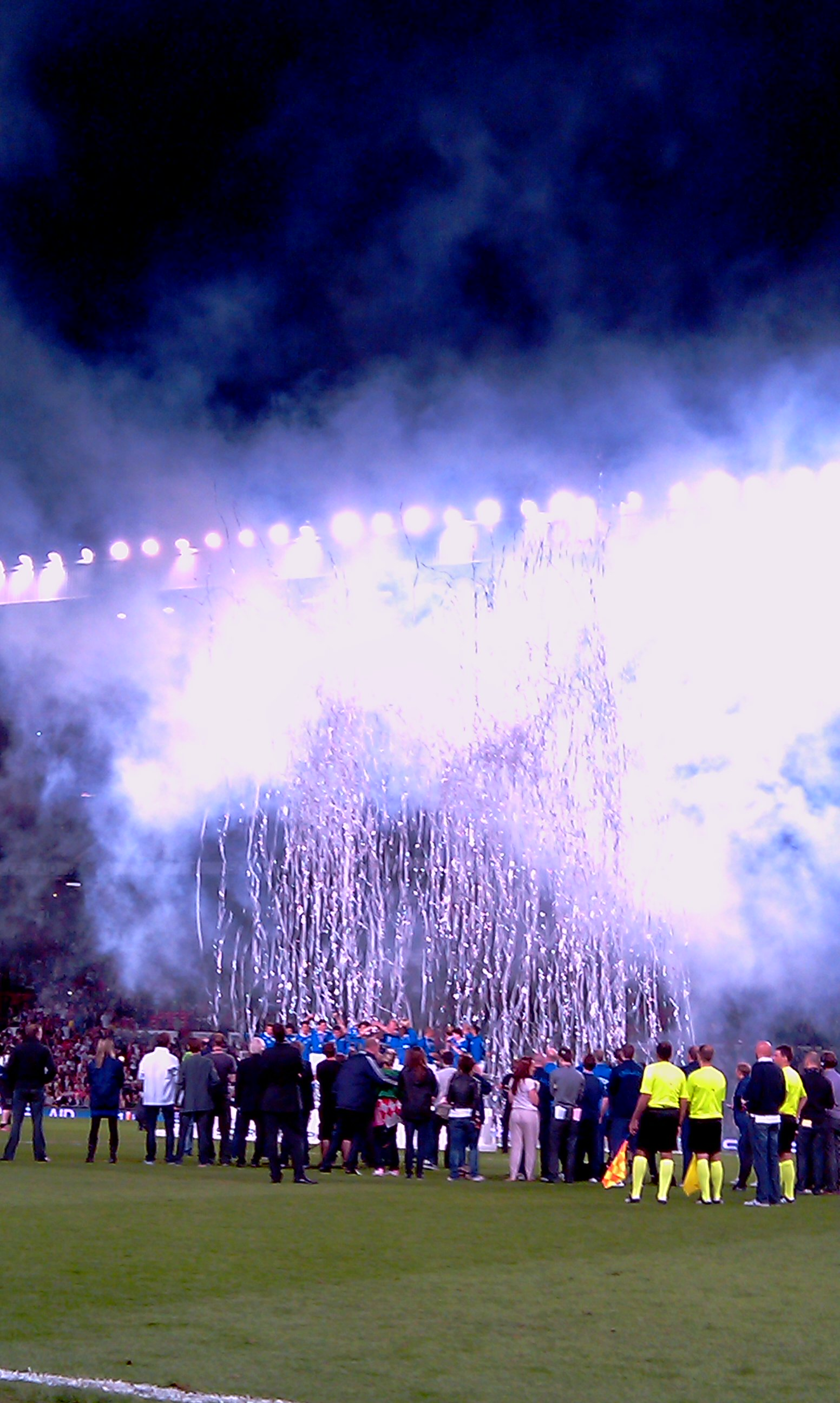

Tournament details
- Host country: England
- Dates: 6 June
- Teams: 2
- Venue: 1

Final positions
- Champions: Rest of the World (1st title)
- Runners-up: England

Tournament statistics
- Matches played: 1
- Goals scored: 4 (4 per match)
- Attendance: 65,493 (65,493 per match)
- Top scorer: Jamie Redknapp (1 goal)

Soccer Aid 2010 was played on 6 June 2010. It was broadcast in the United Kingdom on ITV and presented by Dermot O'Leary.

=== England squad ===
Celebrities

- Robbie Williams (captain)
- Paddy McGuinness
- Bradley Walsh
- Jamie Theakston
- Ricky Hatton
- Damian Lewis
- Olly Murs
- Jonathan Wilkes
- Dominic Cooper
- Ralf Little
- Rupert Penry-Jones (injured)
- Danny Cipriani (injured)
- Ben Shephard

Legends

- David Seaman
- Alan Shearer
- Teddy Sheringham
- Jamie Redknapp
- Martin Keown
- Nicky Butt
- Manager: Harry Redknapp
- Assistant manager: James Corden
- Coach: Bryan Robson

=== Rest of the World squad ===
Celebrities

- Michael Sheen (captain)
- James Kyson
- Gordon Ramsay
- Brian Lara
- Patrick Kielty
- Shane Filan
- Nicky Byrne
- Mike Myers
- Joe Calzaghe
- Gethin Jones
- Woody Harrelson
- Ronan Keating (withdrawn)
- Simon Baker

Legends

- Jens Lehmann
- Henrik Larsson
- Zinedine Zidane
- Ryan Giggs
- Luís Figo
- Sami Hyypiä (replacement for Paolo Maldini)
- Paolo Maldini (withdrew and was replaced by Sami Hyypiä)
- Manager: Kenny Dalglish
- Coaches: Ian Rush and Eric Harrison

=== The match ===
6 June 2010
19:45 BST

England	2–2	Rest of the World
Redknapp 45+1'; Sheringham 61'	Report	Calzaghe 64'; Hyypiä 78'
Penalties
Wilkes (penalty scored); Little (penalty missed); McGuinness (penalty missed); Shephard (penalty scored); Williams (penalty missed); Lewis (penalty scored); Murs (penalty scored); Hatton (penalty scored); Walsh (penalty scored); Cooper (penalty missed); Theakston (penalty missed)	6–7	(penalty scored) Lara; (penalty missed) Byrne; (penalty scored) Filan; (penalty missed) Ramsay; (penalty missed) Jones; (penalty scored) Calzaghe; (penalty scored) Sheen; (penalty scored) Kielty; (penalty scored) Myers; (penalty missed) Baker; (penalty scored) Harrelson

Old Trafford, Manchester
Attendance: 65,493
Referee: Pierluigi Collina (Mark Clattenburg 45')

GK	1	David Seaman	(substituted off) 45'
RB	2	Ben Shephard	(substituted off) 84'
CB	5	Martin Keown	(substituted off) 45'
CB	4	Jonathan Wilkes
LB	3	Robbie Williams (c)	(substituted off) 65'
RM	11	Olly Murs	(substituted off) 65'
CM	6	Jamie Redknapp
CM	8	Damian Lewis	(substituted off) 73'
LM	14	Ralf Little
CF	9	Alan Shearer
CF	10	Teddy Sheringham
Substitutes:
GK	13	Jamie Theakston	(substituted on) 45'
DF	12	Patrick McGuinness	(substituted on) 65'
MF	7	Nicky Butt	(substituted on) 45'
MF	16	Dominic Cooper	(substituted on) 84'
FW	17	Ricky Hatton	(substituted on) 65'
FW	50	Bradley Walsh	(substituted on) 73'
Manager:
Harry Redknapp

GK	1	Jens Lehmann	(substituted off) 45'
RB	2	Gethin Jones
CB	9	Henrik Larsson
CB	4	Sami Hyypiä
LB	3	Gordon Ramsay	(substituted off) 78'
RM	16	Nicky Byrne	(substituted off) 75'
CM	10	Michael Sheen (c)	(substituted off) 45'
CM	11	Ryan Giggs	(substituted off) 45'
LM	6	Joe Calzaghe	(substituted off) 75'
SS	5	Zinedine Zidane
CF	8	Mike Myers	(substituted off) 45'
Substitutes:
GK	20	Patrick Kielty	(substituted on) 45'
DF	17	Brian Lara	(substituted on) 45'
DF	18	Woody Harrelson	(substituted on) 78'
MF	7	Luís Figo	(substituted on) 45'
MF	12	Shane Filan	(substituted on) 45'
MF	14	Simon Baker	(substituted on) 75'
MF	15	James Kyson	(substituted on) 75'
Manager:
Kenny Dalglish

== Soccer Aid 2012 ==
2012 Soccer Aid
Tournament details
- Host country: England
- City: Manchester
- Dates: 27 May
- Teams: 2
- Venue: 1

Final positions
- Champions: England (3rd title)

Tournament statistics
- Matches played: 1
- Goals scored: 4 (4 per match)
- Attendance: 67,346 (67,346 per match)

Soccer Aid 2012 was played on 27 May 2012, as something of a precursor to UEFA Euro 2012 and the 2012 Summer Olympics. It was broadcast in the United Kingdom on ITV and presented by Dermot O'Leary. Cat Deeley presented the backstage build up show before the main event.

=== England squad ===
Celebrities

- Robbie Williams
- Paddy McGuinness
- Marvin Humes
- Jamie Theakston
- Aston Merrygold
- John Bishop
- Olly Murs
- Jonathan Wilkes (Captain)
- Jason Isaacs
- Mark Owen

Legends

- David Seaman
- Des Walker
- Teddy Sheringham
- Kevin Phillips*
- Martin Keown
- Graeme Le Saux

Coaching Staff

- Manager: Sam Allardyce
- Assistant manager: Peter Reid
- Coach: Bradley Walsh

=== Rest of the World squad ===
Celebrities

- Michael Sheen (captain)
- Will Ferrell
- Gordon Ramsay
- Gerard Butler
- Patrick Kielty
- James McAvoy
- Serge Pizzorno
- Mike Myers
- Joe Calzaghe
- Edward Norton
- Woody Harrelson

Legends

- Edwin van der Sar
- Jaap Stam
- Clarence Seedorf
- Roy Keane
- Hernán Crespo
- Freddie Ljungberg
- Ruud van Nistelrooy (withdrawn)

Coaching Staff

- Manager: Kenny Dalglish
- Assistant manager: Ian Rush
- Coach: Eric Harrison

=== The match ===
27 May 2012
20:00 BST

England	3–1	Rest of the World
Sheringham 69'; Wilkes 72'; Phillips 89'	Report	Pizzorno 22'

Old Trafford, Manchester
Attendance: 67,346
Referee: Mark Clattenburg (Howard Webb 45')

GK	1	David Seaman		(substituted off) 45'
RB	2	Ben Shephard
CB	5	Martin Keown		(substituted off) 45'
CB	4	Des Walker
LB	12	Paddy McGuinness	(yellow card) 55'	(substituted off) 63'
RM	7	Olly Murs		(substituted off) 33'
CM	6	John Bishop
CM	8	Jonathan Wilkes (c)
LM	11	Aston Merrygold		(substituted off) 76'
CF	9	Kevin Phillips
CF	10	Teddy Sheringham
Substitutes:
GK	13	Jamie Theakston		(substituted on) 45'
DF	14	Graeme Le Saux		(substituted on) 45'
MF	15	Marvin Humes		(substituted on) 33'	(substituted off) 89'
MF	16	Mark Owen		(substituted on) 76'
DF	3	Robbie Williams		(substituted on) 63'
MF	17	Jason Isaacs		(substituted on) 89'
Manager:
Sam Allardyce

GK	1	Edwin van der Sar	(substituted off) 45'
RB	2	Michael Sheen (c)
CB	5	Jaap Stam
CB	16	Roy Keane	(substituted off) 23'
LB	3	Gordon Ramsay	(substituted off) 66'
RM	12	Gerard Butler	(substituted off) 82'
CM	10	Clarence Seedorf
CM	8	Freddie Ljungberg
LM	7	Serge Pizzorno
SS	4	Will Ferrell	(substituted off) 74'
CF	11	Mike Myers	(substituted off) 52'
Substitutes:
GK	20	Patrick Kielty	(substituted on) 45'
CF	9	Hernán Crespo	(substituted on) 23'
LM	14	Joe Calzaghe	(substituted on) 52'
MF	6	Woody Harrelson	(substituted on) 82'
MF	15	Edward Norton	(substituted on) 74'
DF	17	James McAvoy	(substituted on) 66'
Manager:
Kenny Dalglish

== Soccer Aid 2014 ==
2014 Soccer Aid
Tournament details
- Host country: England
- City: Manchester
- Dates: 8 June
- Teams: 2
- Venue: 1

Final positions
- Champions: Rest of the World (2nd title)
- Runners-up: England

Tournament statistics
- Matches played: 1
- Goals scored: 6 (6 per match)
- Attendance: 65,574 (65,574 per match)

The 2014 match was played at Old Trafford on 8 June 2014.

The main match was hosted by Dermot O'Leary with Kirsty Gallacher, and Cat Deeley presented the backstage build-up show before the main event. Caroline Flack presented from the BT Tower in London. Match commentators were Sam Matterface and Graham Taylor, and Sol Campbell was a studio guest.

By full-time, the total raised for UNICEF was £4,233,019.

=== England squad ===
Celebrities

- Danny Jones
- Stephen Moyer
- Jack Whitehall
- Mark Owen
- Olly Murs
- Paddy McGuinness
- Jonathan Wilkes (captain)
- Jamie Theakston
- Ben Shephard
- John Bishop
- Marvin Humes
- Dominic Cooper
- Matt Smith (withdrawn injured)

Legends

- Jamie Redknapp
- Jamie Carragher
- Paul Ince (withdrawn)
- Des Walker
- David Seaman
- Teddy Sheringham (withdrawn injured)
- Matt Le Tissier
- Kevin Phillips (replacement for Sheringham)

Coaching Staff

- Manager: Sam Allardyce
- Assistant manager: Robbie Williams (injured)
- Coach: Peter Reid
- Coach: Bradley Walsh

=== Rest of the World squad ===
Celebrities

- Michael Sheen (captain)
- James McAvoy
- Gordon Ramsay
- Kevin Bridges
- Nicky Byrne
- Patrick Kielty
- Adam Richman
- Jeremy Renner
- Santiago Cabrera
- Sam Worthington
- Mark Salling
- Martin Compston

Legends

- Edwin van der Sar
- Jaap Stam
- Edgar Davids
- Alessandro Del Piero
- Clarence Seedorf
- Andriy Shevchenko

Coaching Staff

- Manager: José Mourinho
- Assistant manager: Rui Faria
- Coach: José Morais
- Coach: Vic Bettinelli

=== The match ===
8 June 2014
20:00 BST

England	2–4	Rest of the World
Redknapp 75'; Phillips 82' (pen.)	Report	Seedorf 47', 86', 90+1'; Byrne 69'

Old Trafford, Manchester
Attendance: 65,574
Referee: Phil Dowd (Anthony Taylor 45')

GK	1	David Seaman	(substituted off) 45'
RB	2	Marvin Humes	(substituted off) 87'
CB	4	Jamie Carragher
CB	5	Des Walker	(substituted off) 38'
LB	3	Paddy McGuinness	(substituted off) 45'
CM	14	John Bishop
CM	15	Ben Shephard
RM	10	Olly Murs	(substituted off) 72'
AM	8	Jonathan Wilkes (c)
LM	11	Danny Jones
CF	9	Kevin Phillips
Substitutes:
GK	13	Jamie Theakston	(substituted on) 45'
CM	6	Jamie Redknapp	(substituted on) 50'
AM	7	Matt Le Tissier	(substituted on) 38'	(substituted off) 50'
LB	12	Jack Whitehall	(substituted on) 45'	(substituted off) 87'
RM	16	Mark Owen	(substituted on) 72'
LB	17	Stephen Moyer	(substituted on) 87'
RB	18	Dominic Cooper	(substituted on) 87'
Manager:
Sam Allardyce

GK	1	Edwin van der Sar		(substituted off) 45'
RB	2	Michael Sheen (c)		(substituted off) 10'
CB	4	Sam Worthington	Yellow card
CB	5	Jaap Stam
LB	3	Gordon Ramsay (vc)
CM	8	Edgar Davids	Yellow card
CM	10	Clarence Seedorf
RM	11	James McAvoy		(substituted off) 45'	(substituted on) 83'	(substituted off) 90'
SS	10	Alessandro Del Piero		(substituted off) 45'
LM	16	Nicky Byrne
CF	9	Santiago Cabrera
Substitutes:
GK	20	Patrick Kielty		(substituted on) 45'
RM	6	Mark Salling		(substituted on) 73'	(substituted off) 78'
CF	7	Andriy Shevchenko		(substituted on) 45'
RB	14	Martin Compston		(substituted on) 10'
RM	15	Jeremy Renner		(substituted on) 45'	(substituted off) 66'	(substituted on) 90'
RM	17	Kevin Bridges		(substituted on) 66'	(substituted off) 73'
RM	18	Adam Richman		(substituted on) 78'	(substituted off) 83'
Manager:
José Mourinho

Man of the match:

- Jaap Stam (RoW)

Match officials:

- Referee: Phil Dowd (Staffordshire)
- Assistant referees:
  - Gary Beswick (Durham)
  - Jake Collin (Liverpool)
- Fourth official: Anthony Taylor (Cheshire)

== Soccer Aid 2016 ==
2016 Soccer Aid
Tournament details
- Host country: England
- City: Manchester
- Dates: 5 June 2016
- Teams: 2
- Venue: 1

Final positions
- Champions: England (4th title)
- Runners-up: Rest of the World

The 2016 match was played at Old Trafford on Sunday, 5 June. The main match was hosted by Dermot O'Leary and Kirsty Gallacher, with commentary from Clive Tyldesley and Chris Kamara.

=== England squad ===
Celebrities

- Louis Tomlinson
- Olly Murs
- Paddy McGuinness
- Damian Lewis
- Ben Shephard
- Jonathan Wilkes (Captain)
- Jack Whitehall
- Jamie Theakston (Goalkeeper)
- John Bishop
- Mark Wright
- Marvin Humes
- Danny Jones (Withdrawn due to injury)

Legends

- Jamie Carragher
- Robbie Fowler
- Phil Neville
- Sol Campbell
- Jermain Defoe
- Danny Murphy
- Kieron Dyer
- David Seaman (Goalkeeper)

Coaching Staff

- Manager: Sam Allardyce and José Mourinho
- Assistant manager: Robbie Williams (Player-assistant manager)
- Coach: Bradley Walsh

=== Rest of the World squad ===
Celebrities

- Gordon Ramsay (Withdrawn due to injury)
- Nicky Byrne
- Niall Horan
- Serge Pizzorno
- AP McCoy
- Michael Sheen (Captain)
- Matthew Morrison
- Shayne Ward
- Iwan Rheon
- Sean Fletcher
- Thom Evans
- Rickie Haywood Williams
- Patrick Kielty (Goalkeeper)
- Gareth Thomas (Replacement for Gordon Ramsay)

Legends

- Ronaldinho
- Cafu
- Jaap Stam
- Samuel Eto'o (withdrawn due to injury)
- Fabio Cannavaro
- Dimitar Berbatov
- Edgar Davids
- Dida (Goalkeeper)

Coaching Staff

- Manager: Claudio Ranieri
- Assistant Manager: Niall Horan (Player-assistant manager)

=== The match ===
5 June 2016
20:00 BST

England	3–2	Rest of the World
Wright 50'; Defoe 65', 77'	Report	Berbatov 54', 59' (pen.)

Old Trafford, Manchester
Referee: Howard Webb (Jon Moss 46')

GK	1	David Seaman		(substituted off) 46'
RB	7	John Bishop		(substituted off) 56'
CB	6	Sol Campbell		(substituted off) 46'
CB	23	Jamie Carragher
LB	5	Mark Wright		(substituted off) 83'
RM	2	Ben Shephard	(yellow card) 31' (yellow-red card) 52'
CM	4	Phil Neville		(substituted off) 46'
LM	8	Jonathan Wilkes (c)
RF	11	Olly Murs		(substituted off) 66'
CF	9	Robbie Fowler		(substituted off) 46'
LF	10	Marvin Humes		(substituted off) 46'
Substitutes:
GK	13	Jamie Theakston		(substituted on) 46'
MF	17	Danny Murphy		(substituted on) 46'
MF	14	Jack Whitehall		(substituted on) 46'
MF	19	Kieron Dyer		(substituted on) 46'
FW	18	Jermain Defoe		(substituted on) 46'
DF	12	Paddy McGuinness		(substituted on) 56'	(substituted off) 83'
MF	15	Damian Lewis		(substituted on) 66'
DF	16	Louis Tomlinson		(substituted on) 83'
DF	3	Robbie Williams		(substituted on) 83'
Managers:
Sam Allardyce; José Mourinho

GK	1	Dida		(substituted off) 46'
RB	4	Matthew Morrison		(substituted off) 73'
CB	2	Cafu		(substituted off) 46'
CB	6	Jaap Stam		(substituted off) 37'
LB	3	Michael Sheen (c)		(substituted off) 25'
RM	11	Thom Evans		(substituted off) 77'
CM	16	Nicky Byrne		(substituted off) 81'
CM	8	Edgar Davids
LM	7	Serge Pizzorno		(substituted off) 46'
SS	10	Ronaldinho
CF	15	Shayne Ward		(substituted off) 76'
Substitutes:
GK	20	Patrick Kielty		(substituted on) 46'
DF	19	Sean Fletcher		(substituted on) 25'
DF	5	Fabio Cannavaro	(yellow card) 49'	(substituted on) 37'
DF	21	Gareth Thomas		(substituted on) 46'
FW	9	Dimitar Berbatov		(substituted on) 46'
DF	18	Rickie Haywood Williams		(substituted on) 73'
FW	14	Niall Horan		(substituted on) 76'
MF	17	AP McCoy		(substituted on) 77'
MF	12	Iwan Rheon		(substituted on) 81'
Manager:
Claudio Ranieri

Man of the match:

- Mark Wright (England)

Match officials:

- Referee: Howard Webb (South Yorkshire)
- Assistant referees:
  - Darren Cann (Norfolk)
  - Scott Ledger (South Yorkshire)
- Fourth official: Jon Moss (West Riding Yorkshire)

== Soccer Aid 2018 ==
The 2018 match was played at Old Trafford on Sunday 10 June. The main match was hosted by Dermot O'Leary and Kirsty Gallacher, with commentary from Clive Tyldesley and Robbie Savage.

2018 Soccer Aid
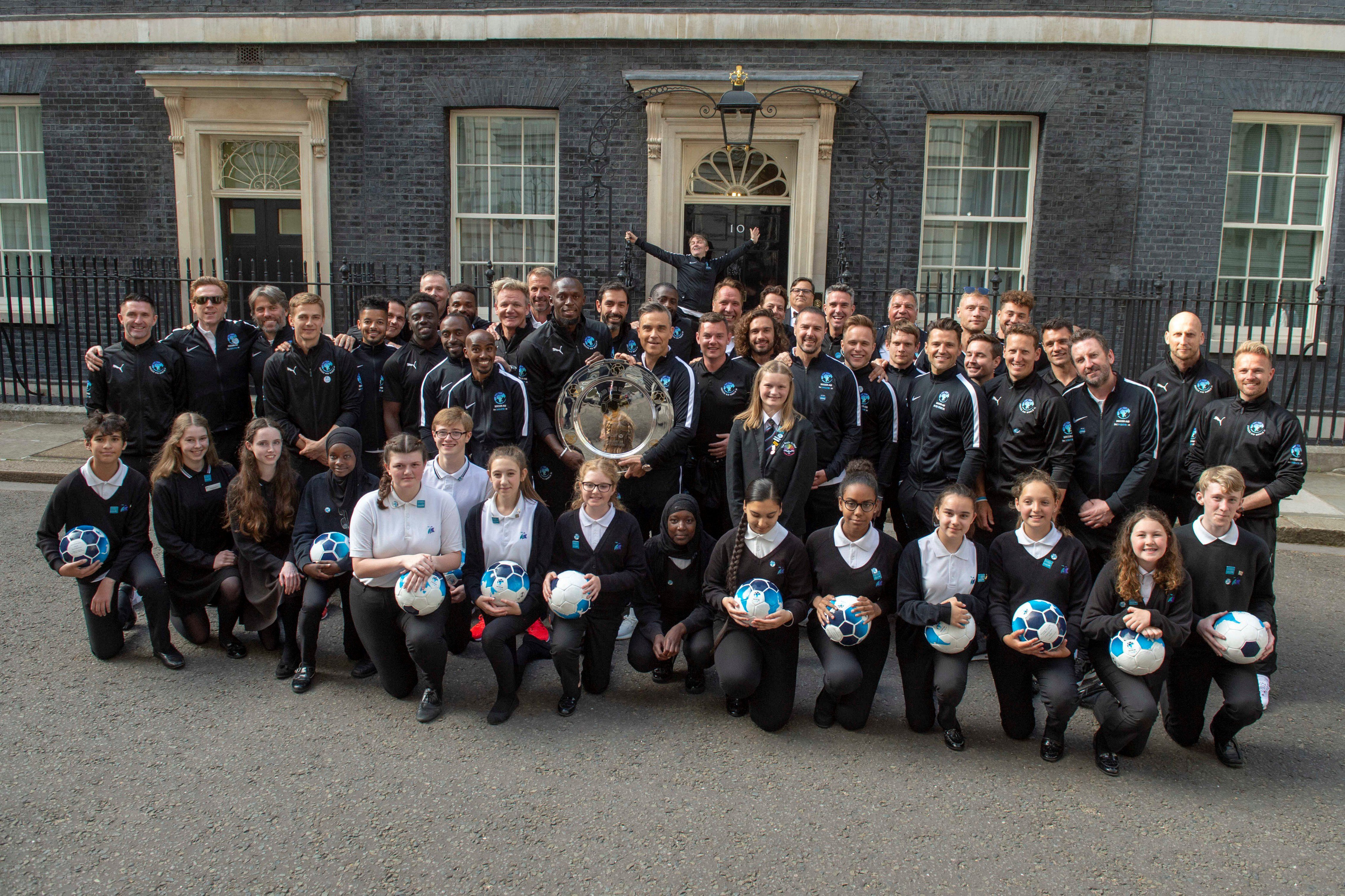

Tournament details
- Host country: England
- City: Manchester
- Dates: 10 June 2018
- Teams: 2
- Venue: 1

Final positions
- Champions: England (5th title)
- Runners-up: Soccer Aid World XI

=== England squad ===
Celebrities

- Olly Murs (Captain)
- Mo Farah
- Joe Wicks
- Mark Wright
- Paddy McGuinness
- Damian Lewis
- Myles Stephenson
- David Harewood
- Andrew Flintoff
- Lee Mack
- Blake Harrison
- Jack O'Connell
- Jeremy Lynch
- Robbie Williams (withdrawn due to injury)
- Billy Wingrove (withdrawn due to injury)
- Ben Shephard (withdrawn due to injury)

Legends

- David Seaman
- Wes Brown
- Phil Neville
- Jamie Redknapp
- Danny Murphy
- Michael Owen
- Darren Bent
- Darius Vassell
- Robbie Fowler (withdrawn due to injury)

Coaching Staff

- Manager: Sam Allardyce
- Assistant Manager: Bradley Walsh
- Coach: Robbie Williams
- Coach: John Bishop
- Coach: Ben Shephard

=== Soccer Aid World XI squad ===
Celebrities

- Usain Bolt (Captain)
- Gordon Ramsay
- Brendan Cole
- Kevin Pietersen
- Dan Carter
- Ashley Fongho
- Martin Compston
- Ioan Gruffudd
- Nicky Byrne
- Danny O'Carroll
- Hayden Christensen

Legends

- Edwin van der Sar
- Jaap Stam
- Clarence Seedorf
- Yaya Touré
- Robert Pires
- Juan Sebastián Verón
- Claude Makélélé
- Patrick Kluivert
- Eric Cantona
- Robbie Keane

Coaching Staff

- Manager: Harry Redknapp and Eric Cantona
- Coach: Michael Sheen

=== The match ===
10 June 2018
20:00 BST

England	3–3	Soccer Aid World XI
Bent 13'; Lynch 17'; Owen 82'		Keane 26'; Verón 43'; Seedorf 57'
Penalties
Flintoff (penalty scored); Wicks (penalty scored); Wright (penalty scored); McGuinness (penalty missed); Mack (penalty missed); Harrison (penalty scored)	4–3	(penalty scored) Bolt; (penalty scored) Fongho; (penalty missed) Pietersen; (penalty missed) Byrne; (penalty scored) Cole; (penalty missed) Christensen

Old Trafford, Manchester
Attendance: 71,965
Referee: Mark Clattenburg

GK	1	David Seaman	(substituted off) 46'
RB	4	Mo Farah	(substituted off) 46'
CB	12	Phil Neville	(substituted off) 81'
CB	6	Wes Brown
LB	5	Mark Wright
RM	14	Myles Stephenson	(substituted off) 54'
CM	13	Danny Murphy	(substituted off) 46'
LM	8	Damian Lewis	(substituted off) 42'
RF	7	Jeremy Lynch	(substituted off) 66'
CF	9	Darren Bent	(substituted off) 56'
LF	11	Olly Murs (c)	(substituted off) 75'
Substitutes:
GK	20	David Harewood	(substituted on) 46'
LM	18	Jack O'Connell	(substituted on) 42' (substituted off) 70'
MF	23	Jamie Redknapp	(substituted on) 46'
RF	16	Darius Vassell	(substituted on) 46'
LB	22	Paddy McGuinness	(substituted on) 54'
CF	10	Michael Owen	(substituted on) 56'
RB	17	Blake Harrison	(substituted on) 66'
CB	19	Andrew Flintoff	(substituted on) 70'
DF	15	Joe Wicks	(substituted on) 75'
CF	21	Lee Mack	(substituted on) 81'
Manager:
Sam Allardyce

GK	1	Edwin van der Sar	(substituted off) 46'
CB	2	Ashley Fongho
CB	6	Jaap Stam	(substituted off) 46'
CB	5	Kevin Pietersen
RWB	12	Danny O'Carroll	(substituted off) 46'
LWB	14	Dan Carter	(substituted off) 46'
CM	18	Juan Sebastián Verón	(substituted off) 46'
CM	67	Martin Compston	(substituted off) 77'
CM	42	Yaya Touré	(substituted off) 73'
SS	7	Robbie Keane	(substituted off) 46' (substituted on) 81'
CF	9.58	Usain Bolt (c)
Substitutes:
GK	16	Nicky Byrne	(substituted on) 46'
DF	4	Claude Makélélé	(substituted on) 46'
CM	8	Robert Pires	(substituted on) 46'
SS	9	Patrick Kluivert	(substituted on) 46'
CM	10	Clarence Seedorf	(substituted on) 46' (substituted off) 81'
CM	20	Brendan Cole	(substituted on) 46'
CF	7	Eric Cantona	(substituted on) 73'
LWB	11	Hayden Christensen	(substituted on) 77'
CB	3	Gordon Ramsay
MF	15	Ioan Gruffudd
Manager:
Harry Redknapp

Man of the match:

- Usain Bolt (Soccer Aid World XI)

Match officials:

- Referee: Mark Clattenburg
- Assistant referees:
  - Jake Collin
  - Stephen Donaldson (South Yorkshire)
- Fourth official: Andrew Dallas

== Soccer Aid 2019 ==
The 2019 match was played at Stamford Bridge. The main match was hosted by Dermot O'Leary and Kirsty Gallacher, with commentary from Clive Tyldesley and Graeme Le Saux. The game was opened by poet Hussain Manawer with his poem Game of Hearts. The 2019 edition was the first to feature female players. As in 2018, the referee was Mark Clattenburg.

At half-time British singer and actress Rita Ora performed new song "Ritual" with British DJ Jonas Blue and Dutch DJ Tiësto, the first time a musician has performed at Soccer Aid. American actor and filmmaker Tom Hanks kicked-off this year's Soccer Aid. Alan Sexton played in the England team as the first and only non-celebrity or legend player at Soccer Aid.

2019 Soccer Aid
Tournament details
- Host country: England
- City: London
- Dates: 16 June 2019
- Teams: 2
- Venue: 1

Final positions
- Champions: Soccer Aid World XI (3rd title)
- Runners-up: England

=== England squad ===
Celebrities

- Mo Farah (Captain)
- Jeremy Lynch
- Mark Wright
- Joe Wicks
- Ben Shephard
- David Harewood
- Marvin Humes
- Danny Jones
- Ant Middleton
- Lee Mack
- Sam Claflin
- Alan Sexton

Legends

- David Seaman
- Jamie Carragher
- Glen Johnson
- John Terry
- Jamie Redknapp
- Joe Cole
- Katie Chapman
- Michael Owen
- Rachel Yankey
- Casey Stoney (withdrawn due to injury)

Coaching Staff

- Manager: Sam Allardyce
- Assistant Manager: Susanna Reid
- Coach: Bradley Walsh

=== Soccer Aid World XI squad ===
Celebrities

- Usain Bolt (Captain)
- Billy Wingrove
- Kem Cetinay
- Niall Horan
- Martin Compston
- Danny O'Carroll
- Jack Savoretti
- Roman Kemp
- Locksmith
- Nicky Byrne
- James McAvoy

Legends

- Júlio César
- Ricardo Carvalho
- Roberto Carlos
- Michael Essien
- Robert Pires
- Rosana
- Francielle
- Didier Drogba
- Robbie Keane
- Eric Cantona

Coaching Staff

- Manager: Harry Redknapp
- Assistant Manager: Piers Morgan

=== The match ===
16 June 2019
19:30 BST

England	2–2	Soccer Aid World XI
Lynch 19', 37'		Bolt 43'; Cetinay 83'
Penalties
Shephard (penalty scored); Wicks (penalty missed); Wright (penalty missed); Mack (penalty missed)	1–3	(penalty scored) Wingrove; (penalty scored) Locksmith; (penalty scored) Cetinay

Stamford Bridge, London
Attendance: 39,836
Referee: Mark Clattenburg (Tom Hanks blew the whistle to start the 1st half instead of Clattenburg)

GK	1	David Seaman	(substituted off) 46'
RB	4	Mo Farah (c)	(substituted off) 46'
CB	26	John Terry
CB	23	Jamie Carragher	(substituted off) 82'
LB	5	Mark Wright
CM	17	Katie Chapman	(substituted off) 57'
CM	2	Glen Johnson	(substituted off) 62' (substituted on) 82'
CM	6	Sam Claflin	(substituted off) 31'
RF	9	Jeremy Lynch	(substituted off) 72'
CF	7	Danny Jones	(substituted off) 57'
LF	11	Rachel Yankey	(substituted off) 46'
Substitutes:
GK	20	David Harewood	(substituted on) 46'
RF	14	Marvin Humes	(substituted on) 31' (substituted off) 62'
CM	33	Ant Middleton	(substituted on) 46' (substituted off) 87'
CM	11	Joe Cole	(substituted on) 46'
CF	10	Michael Owen	(substituted on) 57'
RB	3	Ben Shephard	(substituted on) 57'
CM	8	Jamie Redknapp	(substituted on) 62'
RF	15	Joe Wicks	(substituted on) 62'
CF	95.80	Lee Mack	(substituted on) 72'
CM	19	Alan Sexton	(substituted on) 87'
Manager:
Sam Allardyce

GK	12	Júlio César	(substituted off) 46'
RB	4	Roman Kemp	(substituted off) 31'
CB	14	Locksmith
CB	6	Ricardo Carvalho	(substituted off) 46'
LB	8	Francielle	(substituted off) 46'
RM	77	Rosana	(substituted off) 46'
CM	5	Michael Essien	(substituted off) 80'
CM	67	Martin Compston	(substituted off) 43'
LM	8	Niall Horan	(substituted off) 39'
CF	11	Didier Drogba
CF	9.58	Usain Bolt (c)	(substituted off) 80'
Substitutes:
GK	16	Nicky Byrne	(substituted on) 46'
CM	9	Billy Wingrove	(substituted on) 31' (substituted off) 64' (substituted on) 80'
LM	17	James McAvoy	(substituted on) 39' (substituted off) 60'
RB	12	Danny O'Carroll	(substituted on) 43'
LB	3	Roberto Carlos	(substituted on) 46'
CM	7	Robert Pires	(substituted on) 46'
CF	10	Robbie Keane	(substituted on) 46'
CF	9	Kem Cetinay	(substituted on) 60'
CM	21	Jack Savoretti	(substituted on) 64'
RW	7	Eric Cantona	(substituted on) 80'
Manager:
Harry Redknapp

Man of the match:

- Jeremy Lynch (England)

Match officials:

- Referee: Mark Clattenburg

== Soccer Aid 2020 ==
The 2020 match was scheduled to be played at Old Trafford on 6 June 2020. With the outbreak of COVID-19, the match was postponed with a rescheduled date of 6 September 2020. This Soccer Aid 2020 match was played behind closed doors.

2020 Soccer Aid
Tournament details
- Host country: England
- City: Manchester
- Dates: 6 September 2020
- Teams: 2
- Venue: 1

Final positions
- Champions: Soccer Aid World XI (4th title)
- Runners-up: England

=== England squad ===
Celebrities

- Olly Murs (captain)
- Joe Wicks
- Joel Dommett
- Marvin Humes
- Russell Howard (withdrawn)
- Danny Jones
- Mark Wright
- Lee Mack
- Tom Davis
- James Bay
- John Bishop
- Alfie Allen
- Yung Filly
- Chunkz
- Paddy McGuinness
- Liv Cooke (withdrew due to injury)

Legends

- David James
- Wes Brown
- Ashley Cole
- John Terry
- Katie Chapman
- Joe Cole
- Gareth Barry
- Kelly Smith
- Andy Cole
- Casey Stoney (withdrew due to injury)
- Michael Owen (withdrew due to injury)
- Emile Heskey

Coaching Staff

- Manager: Wayne Rooney, Sam Allardyce and Bradley Walsh

=== Soccer Aid World XI squad ===
Celebrities

- Mo Gilligan (captain)
- Kem Cetinay
- Jason Manford
- Dave
- Chelcee Grimes
- Iain Stirling
- Jeremy Lynch
- Dermot Kennedy
- Roman Kemp
- Ore Oduba
- Locksmith
- Serge Pizzorno
- Billy Wingrove (Withdrew due to injury)

Legends

- Shay Given
- Patrice Evra
- Mikael Silvestre
- Jaap Stam (withdrew)
- Yaya Touré (removed from squad)
- Darren Fletcher
- Claude Makélélé
- Michael Essien
- Robbie Keane
- Lianne Sanderson
- Julie Fleeting
- Roberto Carlos (withdrew)

Coaching Staff

- Manager: Harry Redknapp, Bryan Robson and Vic Bettinelli

Note: Yaya Touré was dropped from the event after sending inappropriate messages in a squad WhatsApp group.

=== The match ===
6 September 2020
19:30 BST

England	1–1	Soccer Aid World XI
Yung Filly 57'	Report	Keane 53'
Penalties
Murs (penalty scored); Mark Wright (penalty scored); Mack (penalty missed); Bay (penalty scored); Chunkz (penalty missed)	3–4	(penalty scored) Lynch; (penalty missed) Locksmith; (penalty scored) Pizzorno; (penalty scored) Kennedy; (penalty scored) Cetinay

Old Trafford, Manchester
Attendance: 0
Referee: Mark Clattenburg

GK	1	David James	(substituted off) 46'
RB	8	John Bishop	(substituted off) 37'
CB	26	John Terry
CB	6	Wes Brown	(substituted off) 50'
LB	44	Mark Wright
CDM	18	Gareth Barry	(substituted off) 46'
CM	17	Katie Chapman	(substituted off) 46' (substituted on) 50' (substituted off) 75'
CM	10	Kelly Smith	(substituted off) 46'
CAM	11	Olly Murs (c)	(substituted off) 80' (substituted on) 83'
ST	7	Danny Jones	(substituted off) 28'
ST	16	Tom Davis	(substituted off) 14'
Substitutes:
GK	14	Alfie Allen	(substituted on) 46'
ST	21	Chunkz	(substituted on) 14' (substituted off) 36'
ST	77	Yung Filly	(substituted on) 28' (substituted off) 63'
ST	999	Lee Mack	(substituted on) 36' (substituted off) 56'
RB	5	Paddy McGuinness	(substituted on) 37' (substituted off) 56'
CM	11	Joe Cole	(substituted on) 46'
ST	11	Emile Heskey	(substituted on) 46' (substituted off) 83'
CB	3	Ashley Cole	(substituted on) 46'
RB	14	Marvin Humes	(substituted on) 56'
CAM	14	James Bay	(substituted on) 56'
CM	15	Joe Wicks	(substituted on) 63'
CM	5	Joel Dommett	(substituted on) 75'
ST	9	Andy Cole	(substituted on) 80'
Managers:
Sam Allardyce; Wayne Rooney; Bradley Walsh

GK	1	Shay Given	(substituted off) 46'
RB	3	Patrice Evra
CB	14	Locksmith
CB	5	Mikael Silvestre	(substituted off) 46'
LB	19	Mo Gilligan(c)	(substituted off) 46'
CM	13	Dermot Kennedy	(substituted off) 65'
CM	5	Michael Essien	(substituted off) 46'
CM	96	Chelcee Grimes	(substituted off) 46'
LW	9	Jeremy Lynch
RW	7	Lianne Sanderson	(substituted off) 46'
CF	7	Serge Pizzorno	(substituted off) 37'
Substitutes:
GK	23	Ore Oduba	(substituted on) 46'
ST	9	Kem Cetinay	(substituted on) 37' (substituted off) 65'
LB	98	Iain Stirling	(substituted on) 46'
ST	10	Robbie Keane	(substituted on) 46'
ST	10	Julie Fleeting	(substituted on) 46'
CB	4	Claude Makélélé	(substituted on) 46'
CM	24	Darren Fletcher	(substituted on) 46'
CM	10	Jason Manford	(substituted on) 65' (substituted off) 76' (substituted on) 88'
CM	16	Dave	(substituted on) 65'
CM	4	Roman Kemp	(substituted on) 76' (substituted off) 88'
Managers:
Harry Redknapp; Bryan Robson

Man of the match:

- Dermot Kennedy (World XI)

Match officials:

- Referee: Mark Clattenburg

== Soccer Aid 2021 ==
The 2021 match was held at the City of Manchester Stadium on 4 September 2021. Lee Mack switched teams to the Rest of the World squad, due to his Irish heritage.

2021 Soccer Aid
Tournament details
- Host country: England
- City: Manchester
- Dates: 4 September 2021
- Teams: 2
- Venue: 1

Final positions
- Champions: Soccer Aid World XI (5th title)
- Runners-up: England

=== England squad ===
Celebrities

- Olly Murs (captain)
- Liv Cooke (withdrew due to illness)
- James Arthur
- Paddy McGuinness (withdrew due to an injury)
- Chunkz
- Mark Wright
- Joel Dommett
- Mo Farah
- Aitch
- Max Whitlock
- James Bay
- Harriet Pavlou
- Stephen Mulhern

Legends

- David James
- Gary Neville
- Jamie Carragher
- Paul Scholes
- Jamie Redknapp
- Fara Williams
- Shaun Wright-Phillips
- Joe Cole
- Wayne Rooney
- Kelly Smith

Coaching Staff

- Manager: Sven-Göran Eriksson
- Coaches: David Seaman, Micah Richards and Robbie Williams

=== Soccer Aid World XI squad ===
Celebrities

- Usain Bolt (captain)
- Kem Cetinay
- Roman Kemp (withdrew due to illness)
- Ore Oduba
- Tom Grennan
- Martin Compston
- Dermot Kennedy
- Yungblud
- Chelcee Grimes
- Big Zuu
- Lee Mack

Legends

- Shay Given
- Roberto Carlos
- Patrice Evra
- Pablo Zabaleta
- Ingrid Moe Wold
- Wes Morgan
- Nigel de Jong
- Clarence Seedorf
- Darren Fletcher
- Robbie Keane (replacement for Rivaldo)
- Rivaldo (withdrawn)
- Julie Fleeting

Coaching Staff

- Manager: Harry Redknapp
- Player-Assistant Manager: Robbie Keane
- Tea Lady / Dish Washer : Judy Murray

==== Other staff ====
- UNICEF Goodwill Ambassador: David Beckham

=== The match ===
4 September 2021
19:30 BST

England	0–3	Soccer Aid World XI
	Report	Cetinay 51', 74'; Mack 90'

City of Manchester Stadium, Manchester
Attendance: 51,674
Referee: Mark Clattenburg

GK	1	David James	(substituted off) 46'
RB	14	James Bay
CB	2	Gary Neville	(substituted off) 46'
CB	23	Jamie Carragher
LB	3	Mark Wright
RM	11	Olly Murs (c)	(substituted off) 15'
CM	10	Wayne Rooney
CM	18	Paul Scholes	(substituted off) 69'
LM	7	Harriet Pavlou	(substituted off) 46'
ST	7	James Arthur	(substituted off) 56'
ST	29	Shaun Wright-Phillips	(substituted off) 46'
Substitutes:
GK	44	Joel Dommett	(substituted on) 46'
LM	40	Aitch	(substituted on) 15' (substituted off) 62' (substituted on) 66'
CM	?	Stephen Mulhern	(substituted on) 46' (substituted off) 52' (yellow card) 48'
CM	4	Fara Williams	(substituted on) 46' (substituted off) 69'
CM	11	Joe Cole	(substituted on) 46'
RB	4	Mo Farah	(substituted on) 52' (substituted off) 66'
ST	21	Chunkz	(substituted on) 56'
LB	6	Max Whitlock	(substituted on) 62'
CM	8	Jamie Redknapp	(substituted on) 69'
CM	10	Kelly Smith	(substituted on) 69'
Manager:
Sven-Göran Eriksson

GK	1	Shay Given	(substituted off) 46'
RB	66	Yungblud	(substituted off) 46'
CB	13	Dermot Kennedy
CB	5	Pablo Zabaleta	(substituted off) 70'
LB	8	Tom Grennan	(substituted off) 56'
CM	10	Clarence Seedorf	(substituted off) 46'
CM	3	Patrice Evra	(substituted off) 46'
CM	3	Roberto Carlos	(substituted off) 46'
RW	10	Julie Fleeting	(substituted off) 31'
LW	9.58	Usain Bolt (c)	(substituted off) 46'
CF	19	Big Zuu	(substituted off) 31'
Substitutes:
GK	23	Ore Oduba	(substituted on) 46'
ST	7	Robbie Keane	(substituted on) 31'
RW	97	Chelcee Grimes	(substituted on) 31'
ST	9	Kem Cetinay	(substituted on) 46'
CM	24	Darren Fletcher	(substituted on) 46'
CM	34	Nigel de Jong	(substituted on) 46'
RB	67	Martin Compston	(substituted on) 46'
CB	5	Wes Morgan	(substituted on) 46'
ST	7	Lee Mack	(substituted on) 56'
LB	2	Ingrid Moe Wold	(substituted on) 70'
Managers:
Harry Redknapp

Man of the match:

- Kem Cetinay (World XI)

Match officials:

- Referee: Mark Clattenburg

== Soccer Aid 2022 ==
The 2022 match was held at the London Stadium, home of West Ham United, on 12 June 2022.

2022 Soccer Aid
Tournament details
- Host country: England
- City: London
- Dates: 12 June 2022
- Teams: 2
- Venue: 1

Final positions
- Champions: Soccer Aid World XI (6th title)
- Runners-up: England

=== England squad ===
Celebrities

- Liam Payne (captain)
- Lucien Laviscount (withdraw)
- Tom Grennan
- Chunkz
- Alex Brooker
- Damian Lewis
- Mo Farah
- Mark Wright
- David Harewood
- Aitch
- Russell Howard

Legends

- David James
- Gary Neville
- Jamie Carragher
- Anita Asante
- Fara Williams
- Joe Cole
- Mark Noble
- Stewart Downing
- Teddy Sheringham
- Eniola Aluko

Coaching Staff

- Manager: Harry Redknapp and Emma Hayes
- Coach: David Seaman and Vicky McClure

=== Soccer Aid World XI squad ===
Celebrities

- Usain Bolt (captain)
- Martin Compston
- Mo Gilligan
- Chelcee Grimes
- Steven Bartlett
- Lee Mack
- Noah Beck
- Munya Chawawa
- Kem Cetinay
- Mark Strong
- Tom Stoltman

Legends

- Petr Cech
- Patrice Evra
- Cafu
- Roberto Carlos
- Andrea Pirlo (withdrew)
- Heather O'Reilly
- Carli Lloyd
- Andriy Shevchenko
- Dimitar Berbatov
- Robbie Keane

Coaching Staff

- Manager: Arsène Wenger
- Player/Coach: Robbie Keane
- Coach: Idris Elba and Graham Stack

=== The match ===
12 June 2022
19:30 BST

England	2–2	Soccer Aid World XI
Wright 42' (pen.); Grennan 47'	Report	Beck 22' (pen.); Cetinay 62'
Penalties
Grennan (penalty missed); Howard (penalty missed); Wright (penalty scored)	1–4	(penalty scored) Beck; (penalty scored) Compston; (penalty scored) Cetinay; (penalty scored) Mack

London Stadium, London
Attendance: 54,410
Referee: Mark Clattenburg

GK	1	David James	(substituted off) 46'
RB	4	Mo Farah	(substituted off) 74' (substituted on) 86'
CB	2	Gary Neville
CB	23	Jamie Carragher	(substituted off) 46'
LB	7	Mark Wright	42'
RM	22	Liam Payne (c)	(substituted off) 28'
CM	16	Mark Noble
CM	4	Fara Williams	(substituted off) 28'
LM	8	Tom Grennan	47'
ST	10	Teddy Sheringham	(substituted off) 30'
ST	14	Alex Brooker	(substituted off) 14'
Substitutes:
RM	21	Chunkz	(substituted on) 14' (substituted off) 46'
LM	11	Russell Howard	(substituted on) 28' (substituted off) 86'
CM	6	Anita Asante	(substituted on) 28' (substituted off) 66'
CM	26	Joe Cole	(substituted on) 30'
GK	20	David Harewood	(substituted on) 46'
RM	66	Damian Lewis	(substituted on) 46'
CM	19	Stewart Downing	(substituted on) 46'
ST	9	Eniola Aluko	(substituted on) 66'
LM	40	Aitch	(substituted on) 74'
Manager:
Harry Redknapp

GK	1	Petr Cech	(substituted off) 46'
RB	2	Cafu
CB	3	Patrice Evra
CB	19	Mo Gilligan	(substituted off) 40'
LB	3	Roberto Carlos	(substituted off) 9'
CM	8	Noah Beck	22'
CM	67	Martin Compston	(substituted off) 61'
CM	6	Mark Strong	(substituted off) 24'
RW	9	Heather O'Reilly	(substituted off) 36'
LW	9.58	Usain Bolt (c)	(substituted off) 66'
CF	7	Andriy Shevchenko	(substituted off) 56'
Substitutes:
CB	9	Dimitar Berbatov	(substituted on) 9' (substituted off) 78'
ST	9	Kem Cetinay	(substituted on) 24', (goal) 62'
LW	97	Chelcee Grimes	(substituted on) 36' (substituted off) 74' (substituted on) 78'
CM	10	Robbie Keane	(substituted on) 40'
GK	55	Tom Stoltman	(substituted on) 46'
ST	10	Carli Lloyd	(substituted on) 56'
LB	92	Steven Bartlett	(substituted on) 61'
RW	14	Munya Chawawa	(substituted on) 66'
ST	7	Lee Mack	(substituted on) 74'
Managers:
Arsène Wenger

== Soccer Aid 2023 ==
The 2023 match was held at Old Trafford on 11 June 2023. Jill Scott became the first female to captain a team in any edition. Steven Bartlett withdrew from the game after a hamstring injury he picked up during practice.

2023 Soccer Aid
Tournament details
- Host country: England
- City: Manchester
- Dates: 11 June 2023
- Teams: 2
- Venue: 1

Final positions
- Champions: Soccer Aid World XI (7th title)
- Runners-up: England

=== England squad ===
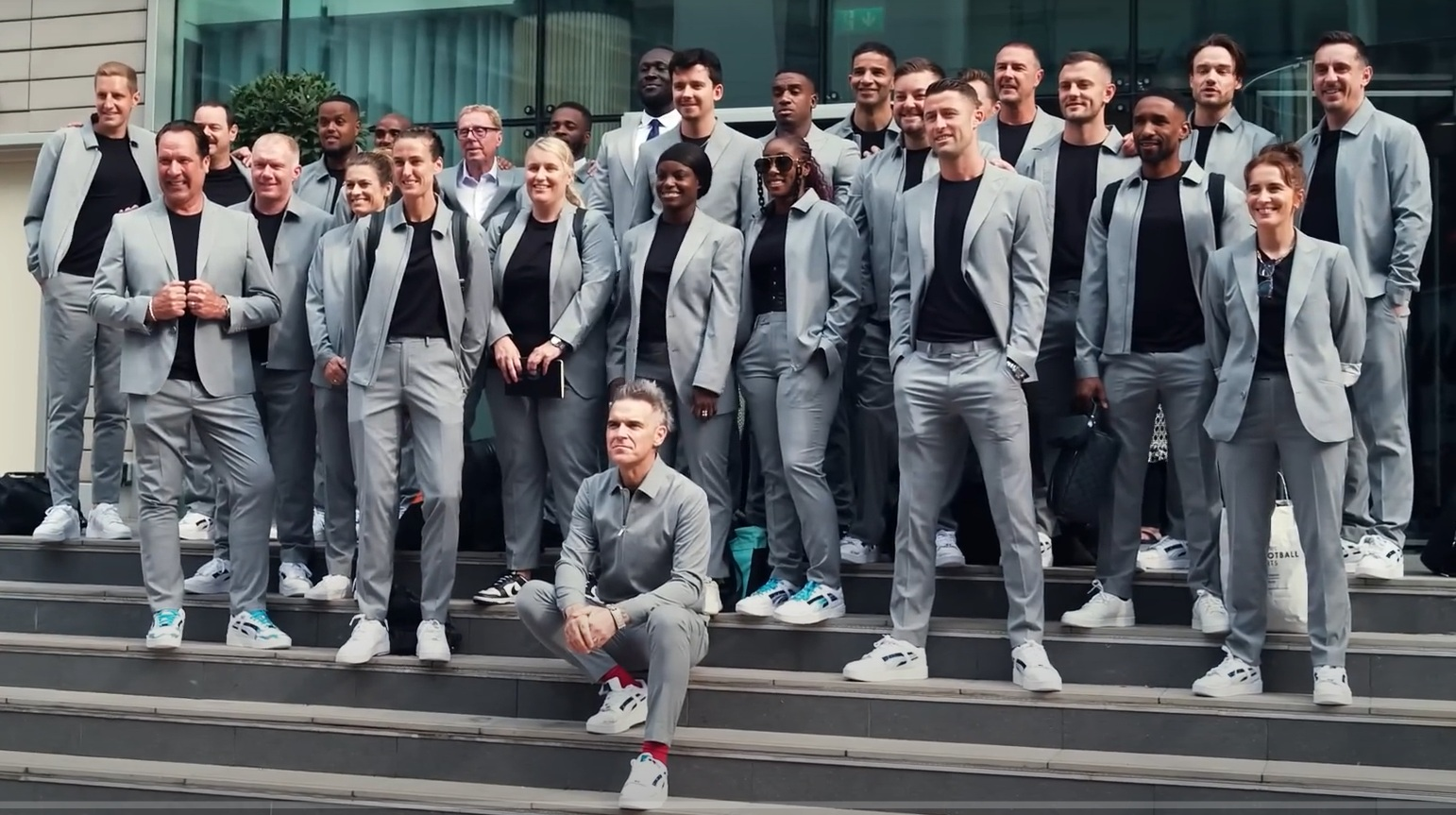
England squad for Soccer Aid for UNICEF 2023

Celebrities

- Paddy McGuinness
- Bugzy Malone
- Tom Grennan
- Mo Farah
- Alex Brooker
- Chunkz
- Joel Corry
- Scarlette Douglas
- Liam Payne
- Danny Dyer
- Asa Butterfield
- Tom Hiddleston

Legends

- David James
- Gary Neville
- Gary Cahill
- Michael Dawson
- Jill Scott (captain)
- Karen Carney
- Jack Wilshere
- Nicky Butt (withdrew)
- Paul Scholes
- Zavon Hines
- Eniola Aluko
- Jermain Defoe

Coaching Staff

- Manager: Stormzy, Harry Redknapp and Emma Hayes
- Player/Coach: Zavon Hines
- Coach: Vicky McClure, Robbie Williams and David Seaman

=== Soccer Aid World XI squad ===
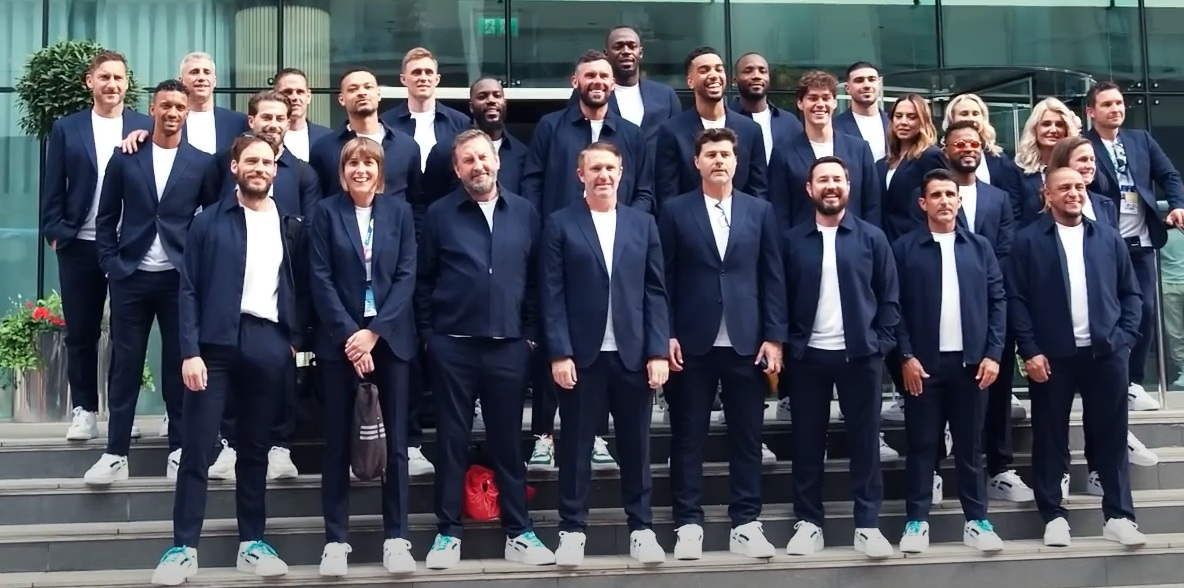
World XI squad Soccer Aid for UNICEF 2023

Celebrities

- Usain Bolt (captain)
- Lee Mack
- Steven Bartlett (withdrew)
- Kem Cetinay
- Mo Gilligan
- Maisie Adam
- Tommy Fury
- Noah Beck
- Leon Edwards
- Sam Claflin
- Niko Omilana

Legends

- Ben Foster
- Roberto Carlos
- Patrice Evra
- Kaylyn Kyle
- Heather O'Reilly
- Nani
- Darren Fletcher
- Izzy Christiansen
- Francesco Totti
- Hernán Crespo
- Gabriel Batistuta (withdrew)
- Robbie Keane

Coaching Staff

- Manager: Mauricio Pochettino and Martin Compston
- Assistant Manager: Jesús Pérez
- Player/Coach: Robbie Keane
- Coach: Melanie C and Daniel Bachmann

=== The match ===
11 June 2023
19:30 BST

England	2–4	Soccer Aid World XI
Butterfield 50'; Scholes 53'	Report	Bolt 24'; Keane 65', 70'; Cetinay 80'

Old Trafford, Manchester
Attendance: 74,000
Referee: Abigail Byrne

GK	1	David James	(substituted off) 46'
CB	2	Gary Neville	(substituted off) 46'
CB	24	Gary Cahill
CB	61	Bugzy Malone	(substituted off) 26'
RM	7	Joel Corry	(substituted off) 46'
CM	8	Jill Scott (c)	(substituted off) 30'
CM	10	Jack Wilshere
LM	6	Tom Hiddleston
RF	22	Liam Payne	(substituted off) 30'
CF	9	Jermain Defoe	(substituted off) 46' (substituted on) 70'
LF	8	Tom Grennan
Substitutes:
GK	1	Paddy McGuinness	(substituted on) 46'
CB	4	Mo Farah	(substituted on) 26'
CM	77	Danny Dyer	(substituted on) 30' (substituted off) 46'
CM	10	Karen Carney	(substituted on) 30' (substituted off) 76'
RM	3	Asa Butterfield	(substituted on) 46', (goal) 50', (substituted off) 70'
CM	18	Paul Scholes	(substituted on) 46', (goal) 53', (substituted off) 57'
CB	20	Michael Dawson	(substituted on) 46' (substituted off) 70'
CF	21	Chunkz	(substituted on) 46'
RF	9	Eniola Aluko	(substituted on) 57'
RM	14	Alex Brooker	(substituted on) 70' (substituted off) 83'
CM	7	Zavon Hines	(substituted on) 76'
LM	7	Scarlette Douglas	(substituted on) 83'
Managers:
Stormzy; Harry Redknapp; Emma Hayes; Vicky McClure; David Seaman

GK	1	Ben Foster	(substituted off) 46'
RB	9	Heather O'Reilly	(substituted off) 31'
CB	11	Sam Claflin
CB	3	Roberto Carlos	(substituted off) 10'
LB	19	Mo Gilligan	(substituted off) 46'
CM	8	Noah Beck
CM	3	Patrice Evra
RW	23	Maisie Adam	(substituted off) 21'
LW	9.58	Usain Bolt (c)	24', (substituted off) 61'
CF	10	Francesco Totti	(substituted off) 61'
CF	9	Hernán Crespo	(substituted off) 31'
Substitutes:
GK	11	Leon Edwards	(substituted on) 46'
CM	24	Darren Fletcher	(substituted on) 10'
RW	10	Tommy Fury	(substituted on) 21' (substituted off) 46'
CF	17	Nani	(substituted on) 31'
RB	6	Kaylyn Kyle	(substituted on) 31' (substituted off) 61'
CF	7	Lee Mack	(substituted on) 46'
RW	9	Kem Cetinay	(substituted on) 46', (goal) 80'
RB	8	Izzy Christiansen	(substituted on) 61'
CF	10	Robbie Keane	(substituted on) 61', (goal) 65', 70'
CF	99	Niko Omilana	(substituted on) 61'
Managers:
Mauricio Pochettino; Martin Compston; Melanie C Robbie Keane; Jesus Perez

== Soccer Aid 2024 ==
The 2024 match was held at Stamford Bridge on 9 June 2024. Steven Bartlett switched teams to the England squad. England lifted the trophy for the first time since 2018, after a 6–3 win against the World XI, breaking the previous highest scoring record from 2008 of seven. Ellen White also became the first female player to score in a Soccer Aid match.

2024 Soccer Aid
Tournament details
- Host country: England
- City: London
- Dates: 9 June 2024
- Teams: 2
- Venue: 1

Final positions
- Champions: England (6th title)
- Runners-up: Soccer Aid World XI

=== England squad ===
Celebrities

- Stuart Broad
- Bobby Brazier
- Sam Thompson
- Paddy McGuinness
- Tom Grennan
- Mo Farah
- Alex Brooker
- Erin Doherty (withdrew)
- Steven Bartlett
- Danny Dyer
- Sam Quek
- Miniminter
- Eddie Hearn
- Tom Hiddleston

Legends

- David James
- Gary Cahill
- Ashley Cole
- Jill Scott (captain)
- Karen Carney
- Jack Wilshere
- Joe Cole
- Theo Walcott
- Ellen White
- Jermain Defoe

Coaching Staff

- Manager/Coach: Frank Lampard, Robbie Williams, Vicky McClure, Harry Redknapp, and David Seaman

=== Soccer Aid World XI squad ===
Celebrities

- Usain Bolt (captain)
- Maisie Adam
- Tommy Fury
- Livi Sheldon
- Martin Compston
- Roman Kemp
- Lee Mack
- Theo Baker
- Jason Manford
- Tony Bellew
- Tion Wayne
- Micheal Ward
- Emmett J. Scanlan
- Billy Wingrove
- Iain Stirling

Legends

- Petr Čech
- Roberto Carlos (withdrew)
- Patrice Evra
- Michael Essien
- Mikel John Obi (withdrew)
- Kaylyn Kyle
- Kheira Hamraoui
- Eden Hazard
- Alessandro Del Piero
- Olga García
- Robbie Keane

Coaching Staff

- Manager/Coach: Mauricio Pochettino, Jesús Pérez and Toni Jiménez
- Player/Coach: Billy Wingrove and Robbie Keane

=== The match ===
9 June 2024
19:30 BST

England	6–3	Soccer Aid World XI
Cole 7'; White 30'; Bartlett 53', 73'; Defoe 63'; Walcott 81'	Report	Hazard 14'; Del Piero 19'; Wingrove 76' (pen.)

Stamford Bridge, London
Attendance: 40,000
Referee: Rebecca Welch

GK	1	David James	(substituted off) 46'
RB	77	Danny Dyer	(substituted off) 27'
CB	24	Gary Cahill
CB	8	Stuart Broad
LB	13	Sam Quek	(substituted off) 38'
RM	8	Tom Grennan
CM	10	Jack Wilshere	(substituted off) 46'
CM	8	Jill Scott (c)	(substituted off) 46'
LM	25	Sam Thompson	(substituted off) 40'
CF	10	Joe Cole	7', (substituted off) 46'
CF	9	Ellen White	30', (substituted off) 46'
Substitutes:
GK	1	Paddy McGuinness	(substituted on) 46'
RB	6	Tom Hiddleston	(substituted on) 27' (substituted off) 52'
LB	4	Mo Farah	(substituted on) 38' (substituted off) 52'
LM	14	Alex Brooker	(substituted on) 40' (substituted off) 53'
CF	9	Jermain Defoe	(substituted on) 46', (goal) 63'
CM	10	Karen Carney	(substituted on) 46'
CM	3	Ashley Cole	(substituted on) 46'
CF	14	Theo Walcott	(substituted on) 46', (goal) 81'
LB	92	Steven Bartlett	(substituted on) 52', (goal) 53', 73'
RB	15	Bobby Brazier	(substituted on) 52'
LM	12	Eddie Hearn	(substituted on) 53' (substituted off) 71'
LM	7	Miniminter	(substituted on) 71'
Managers:
Frank Lampard; Harry Redknapp; Robbie Williams; Vicky McClure; David Seaman

GK	1	Petr Čech	(substituted off) 46'
RB	67	Martin Compston	(substituted off) 46' (substituted on) 80'
CB	4	Roman Kemp	(substituted off) 58'
CB	3	Patrice Evra	(substituted off) 78'
LB	13	Emmett J. Scanlan	(substituted off) 15'
CM	5	Michael Essien
CM	14	Kheira Hamraoui	(substituted off) 35' (substituted on) 78'
RW	7	Lee Mack	(substituted off) 16'
LW	10	Eden Hazard	14'
CF	10	Alessandro Del Piero	19', (substituted off) 46'
CF	9.58	Usain Bolt (c)	(substituted off) 67'
Substitutes:
GK	20	Tony Bellew	(substituted on) 46'
LB	18	Micheal Ward	(substituted on) 15'
RW	23	Maisie Adam	(substituted on) 16' (substituted off) 36'
CM	6	Kaylyn Kyle	(substituted on) 35' (substituted off) 62'
RW	0	Tommy Fury	(substituted on) 36' (substituted off) 46'
CF	7	Robbie Keane	(substituted on) 46'
RW	9	Livi Sheldon	(substituted on) 46' (substituted off) 63' (substituted on) 87'
RB	14	Theo Baker	(substituted on) 46' (substituted off) 86'
CF	11	Billy Wingrove	(substituted on) 58', (goal) 76' (substituted off) 87'
CM	9	Olga García	(substituted on) 62'
RW	99	Tion Wayne	(substituted on) 63'
LB	8	Jason Manford	(substituted on) 67' (substituted off) 80'
RB	98	Iain Stirling	(substituted on) 86'
Managers:
Mauricio Pochettino; Robbie Keane; Jesus Perez; Billy Wingrove; Toni Jimenez

== Soccer Aid 2025 ==
The 2025 match was held at Old Trafford on 15 June 2025. The World XI team won the match 5-4, with Big Zuu scoring the winner, with 6 minutes left. Carlos Tevez also scored 4 goals, as they came from 3-0 down.

2025 Soccer Aid
Tournament details
- Host country: England
- City: Manchester
- Dates: 15 June 2025
- Teams: 2
- Venue: 1

Final positions
- Champions: Soccer Aid World XI
- Runners-up: England

=== England squad ===
Celebrities

- Paddy McGuinness (GK)
- Louis Tomlinson
- Sam Thompson
- Steven Bartlett
- Alex Brooker
- Mo Farah
- Angryginge
- Tom Grennan
- Sam Quek
- Bear Grylls (withdrew)
- Denise Lewis
- James Nelson-Joyce
- Bella Ramsey
- Roman Kemp

Legends

- Joe Hart (GK)
- Phil Jagielka
- Steph Houghton
- Gary Neville
- Paul Scholes (withdrew)
- Jack Wilshere
- Jill Scott (captain)
- Michael Carrick
- Aaron Lennon
- Toni Duggan
- Wayne Rooney
- Jermain Defoe

Coaching Staff

- Manager/Coach: Tom Hiddleston, Tyson Fury, David James, Vicky McClure, Robbie Williams and Harry Redknapp
- Player/Coach: Wayne Rooney

=== Soccer Aid World XI squad ===
Celebrities

- Nicky Byrne (GK)
- Livi Sheldon
- Lee Mack (withdrew)
- Gorka Márquez
- TBJZL
- Bryan Habana
- Dermot Kennedy
- Tony Bellew
- Richard Gadd
- Billy Wingrove
- Noah Beck
- Big Zuu
- Maisie Adam
- Asim Chaudhry

Legends

- Edwin van der Sar (GK)
- Nemanja Vidić (Captain)
- Leonardo Bonucci
- John O'Shea
- Kheira Hamraoui
- Kaylyn Kyle
- Harry Kewell
- Nadia Nadim (withdrew)
- Robbie Keane
- Carlos Tevez
- David Trezeguet
- Rivaldo

Coaching Staff

- Managers: Peter Schmeichel, Robbie Keane, Martin Compston and Emmett J. Scanlan
- Player/Coach: Robbie Keane
- Goalkeeper Coach: Daniel Bachmann

=== The match ===
15 June 2025
19:30 BST

England	4–5	Soccer Aid World XI
Rooney 4'; Duggan 45+1'; Defoe 55', 65'		Tevez 59', 60', 69', 73'; Big Zuu 84'

Old Trafford, Manchester
Referee: Rebecca Welch

GK	1	Joe Hart (substituted off) 46'
RB	28	Louis Tomlinson (substituted off) 46'
CB	13	Angryginge
CB	2	Gary Neville (substituted off) 46'
LB	8	Tom Grennan
RM	23	James Nelson-Joyce (substituted off) 42'
CM	8	Jill Scott (c) (substituted off) 34'
CM	16	Michael Carrick (substituted off) 46'
LM	3	Bella Ramsey (substituted off) 23'
AM	10	Jack Wilshere
CF	10	Wayne Rooney 4', (substituted off) 46'
Substitutes:
GK	1	Paddy McGuinness (substituted on) 46'
LM	14	Alex Brooker (substituted on) 23' (substituted off) 34'
LM	7	Denise Lewis (substituted on) 34', (substituted off) 46'
AM	11	Toni Duggan (substituted on) 34', (goal) 45+1', (substituted off) 62'
RM	4	Mo Farah (substituted on) 42', (substituted off) 62'
CB	6	Phil Jagielka (substituted on) 46'
CF	9	Jermain Defoe (substituted on) 46', (goal) 55', 65'
RM	7	Aaron Lennon (substituted on) 46'
LM	92	Steven Bartlett (substituted on) 46'
LB	4	Roman Kemp (substituted on) 46'
CM	6	Steph Houghton (substituted on) 62'
CM	13	Sam Quek (substituted on) 62', (substituted off) 85'
CM	25	Sam Thompson (substituted on) 85'
Managers:
Tyson Fury; Harry Redknapp; Robbie Williams; Tom Hiddleston; Vicky McClure; David James

GK	1	Edwin van der Sar (substituted off) 46'
RB	9	Tony Bellew (substituted off) 7'
CB	15	Nemanja Vidić (c) (substituted off) 46'
CB	3	Richard Gadd (substituted off) 46'
LB	10	Harry Kewell (substituted off) 15'
CM	13	Dermot Kennedy
CM	14	Kheira Hamraoui (substituted off) 46'
CM	7	Asim Chaudhry (substituted off) 23'
AM	9	Livi Sheldon (substituted off) 23'
CF	17	David Trezeguet (substituted off) 54'
CF	10	Rivaldo (substituted off) 46'
Substitutes:
LB	3	Gorka Marquez (substituted on) 7', (substituted off) 46', (substituted on) 82'
RB	22	John O'Shea (substituted on) 15'
GK	16	Nicky Byrne (substituted on) 46', (yellow card) 48'
CM	8	Noah Beck (substituted on) 23'
AM	23	Maisie Adam (substituted on) 23'
CF	32	Carlos Tevez (substituted on) 46', (goal) 59', 60', 69', 73', (yellow card) 89'
CB	19	Leonardo Bonucci (substituted on) 46'
CM	6	Kaylyn Kyle (substituted on) 46'
AM	11	Bryan Habana (substituted on) 46', (substituted off) 75'
CM	6	Kaylyn Kyle (substituted on) 46'
LB	11	Billy Wingrove (substituted on) 46', (substituted off) 82'
CM	21	TBJZL (substituted on) 46'
CF	7	Robbie Keane (substituted on) 54'
AM	19	Big Zuu (substituted on) 75'
Managers:
Peter Schmeichel; Robbie Keane; Martin Compston; Emmett J. Scanlan

== Soccer Aid 2026 ==
The 2026 match was held at the London Stadium, home of West Ham United, on 31 May 2026. England won 3–2.

2026 Soccer Aid
Tournament details
- Host country: England
- City: London
- Dates: 31 May 2026
- Teams: 2
- Venue: 1

Final positions
- Champions: England
- Runners-up: Soccer Aid World XI

=== England squad ===
Celebrities

- Paddy McGuinness
- Angryginge
- Alex Brooker
- Chloe Burrows
- Damson Idris
- GK Barry
- Joe Marler (GK)
- Jordan North
- Olly Murs
- Owen Cooper
- Sam Thompson
- Tom Grennan
- Tom Hiddleston
- Jack Whitehall
- Danny Dyer

Legends

- Jack Wilshere
- Wayne Rooney
- Theo Walcott
- Jermain Defoe
- Jill Scott
- Shaun Wright Phillips
- Toni Duggan
- Joe Hart (GK)
- Joleon Lescott
- Jade Moore
- Manager/Coach: Robbie Williams, Harry Redknapp, David Seaman, Bradley Walsh

=== World XI squad ===
Celebrities

- TBJZL
- Chris O’Dowd (GK)
- Nicky Byrne
- Nikolaj Coster-Waldau
- Richard Gadd
- Maisie Adam
- Harry Aikines-Aryeetey
- Simon Neil
- Dermot Kennedy
- Nabhaan Rizwan
- Frankie Dettori
- Behzinga
- Molly McCann

Legends

- Tim Cahill
- Michael Essien
- Jordi Alba
- Edwin van der Sar (GK)
- Jen Beattie
- Ali Krieger
- Nemanja Matic
- Dimitar Berbatov
- Lukas Podolski
- Leonardo Bonucci
- Manager/Coach: Clarence Seedorf, Usain Bolt, Judi Love

=== The match ===
31 May 2026
18:30 BST

England	3-2	Soccer Aid World XI
Idris 32'; Defoe 58', 60'		Essien 74'; Cahill 82'

London Stadium, London
Referee: Cheryl Foster

GK	1	Joe Hart (substituted off) 46'
RB	8	Owen Cooper (substituted off) 48'
CB	13	Angryginge
CB	6	Joleon Lescott
LB	25	Sam Thompson (substituted off) 21'
RM	7	Damson Idris 32', (substituted off) 79'
CM	8	Tom Grennan
CM	10	Jack Wilshere (substituted off) 79'
LM	11	Toni Duggan (substituted off) 34'
AM	10	Wayne Rooney (c) (substituted off) 46', (substituted on) 79'
CF	9	Jermain Defoe 58', 60', (substituted off) 61'
Substitutes:
GK	1	Joe Marler (substituted on) 46'
LB	6	Tom Hiddleston (substituted on) 21' (substituted off) 42'
CM	20	Jade Moore (substituted on) 34', (substituted off) 62'
LM	10	GK Barry (substituted on) 42', (substituted off) 46'
LB	10	Jordan North (substituted on) 46', (substituted off) 64'
RB	77	Danny Dyer (substituted on) 46', (substituted off) 68'
AM	14	Theo Walcott (substituted on) 46'
CF	29	Shaun Wright-Phillips (substituted on) 61'
CM	8	Jill Scott (substituted on) 62'
LB	11	Olly Murs (substituted on) 64'
LM	14	Jack Whitehall (substituted on) 68', (substituted off) 88'
RM	14	Chloe Burrows (substituted on) 79', (substituted off) 86'
RM	14	Alex Brooker (substituted on) 85'
CF	5	Paddy McGuinness (substituted on) 88'
Managers:
Robbie Williams; Harry Redknapp; Bradley Walsh; David Seaman

GK	1	Edwin van der Sar (c), (substituted off) 46'
RB	7	Nikolaj Coster-Waldau (substituted off) 23'
CB	21	Nemanja Matić
CB	3	Richard Gadd (substituted off) 62'
LB	18	Jordi Alba
RM	25	Behzinga
CM	5	Jen Beattie (substituted off) 31'
CM	13	Dermot Kennedy
LM	14	Nabhaan Rizwan (substituted off) 46'
AM	5	Michael Essien 74', (substituted off) 75'
CF	9	Dimitar Berbatov (substituted off) 46'
Substitutes:
RM	9	Harry Aikines-Aryeetey (substituted on) 23', (substituted off) 46'
CM	11	Ali Krieger (substituted on) 31', (substituted off) 46'
GK	1	Chris O'Dowd (substituted on) 46'
RM	23	Maisie Adam (substituted on) 46', (substituted off) 57'
CM	16	Nicky Byrne (substituted on) 46', (substituted off) 78'
CF	10	Lukas Podolski (substituted on) 46'
AM	17	Tim Cahill (substituted on) 46', (goal) 82'
RM	4	Molly McCann (substituted on) 57'
CB	57	Simon Neil (substituted on) 62', (substituted off) 84'
CB	19	Leonardo Bonucci (substituted on) 75'
CM	21	TBJZL (substituted on) 78'
AM	7	Frankie Dettori (substituted on) 84'
Managers:
Usain Bolt; Clarence Seedorf; Judi Love; Joe van der Sar

== Statistics ==
Appearances as of 2025. Goals as of 2026.

=== Top scorers ===
Rank	Player	Goals
1	Jermain Defoe	7
2	Kem Cetinay	5
3	Clarence Seedorf	4
3	Robbie Keane	4
3	Carlos Tevez	4
4	Teddy Sheringham	3
4	Jonathan Wilkes	3
4	Jeremy Lynch	3
5	Alan Shearer	2
5	Paolo Di Canio	2
5	Steven Bartlett	2
5	Jamie Redknapp	2
5	Kevin Phillips	2
5	Dimitar Berbatov	2
5	Mark Wright	2
5	Usain Bolt	2
6	Les Ferdinand	1
6	Diego Maradona	1
6	Serge Pizzorno	1
6	Gilles Marini	1
6	Joe Calzaghe	1
6	Sami Hyypiä	1
6	Nicky Byrne	1
6	Darren Bent	1
6	Juan Verón	1
6	Michael Owen	1
6	Yung Filly	1
6	Lee Mack	1
6	Noah Beck	1
6	Tom Grennan	1
6	Asa Butterfield	1
6	Paul Scholes	1
6	Joe Cole	1
6	Eden Hazard	1
6	Alessandro Del Piero	1
6	Ellen White	1
6	Theo Walcott	1
6	Billy Wingrove	1
6	Wayne Rooney	1
6	Toni Duggan	1
6	Big Zuu	1
6	Damson Idris	1
6	Michael Essien	1
6	Tim Cahill	1

=== Most appearances ===
Rank	Player	Appearances
1	Paddy McGuinness	10
2	David Seaman	8
2	Robbie Keane	8
4	Ben Shephard	7
4	Jamie Redknapp	7
4	Lee Mack	7
4	Mo Farah	7
4	Nicky Byrne	7
4	Olly Murs	7
10	Jamie Theakston	6
10	Jonathan Wilkes	6
10	Mark Wright	6
10	Martin Compston	6
10	Patrick Kielty	6
10	Usain Bolt	6
16	Damian Lewis	5
16	David James	5
16	Gordon Ramsay	5
16	Jaap Stam	5
16	Jamie Carragher	5
16	Joe Cole	5
16	Kem Cetinay	5
16	Marvin Humes	5
16	Patrice Evra	5
16	Tom Grennan	5
26	Alex Brooker	4
26	Chunkz	4
26	Clarence Seedorf	4
26	Danny Jones	4
26	Edwin van der Sar	4
26	Gary Neville	4
26	Jermain Defoe	4
26	John Bishop	4
26	Robbie Williams	4
26	Roberto Carlos	4
26	Roman Kemp	4
26	Teddy Sheringham	4
38	Billy Wingrove	3
38	Chelcee Grimes	3
38	Darren Fletcher	3
38	David Harewood	3
38	Dermot Kennedy	3
38	Des Walker	3
38	Graeme Le Saux	3
38	Jack Wilshere	3
38	James McAvoy	3
38	Jeremy Lynch	3
38	Jill Scott	3
38	Joe Wicks	3
38	Kaylyn Kyle	3
38	Maisie Adam	3
38	Michael Essien	3
38	Michael Sheen	3
38	Mo Gilligan	3
38	Noah Beck	3
38	Serge Pizzorno	3
38	Steven Bartlett	3
58	65 Players	2
123	171 Players	1

== See also ==
- World XI
- Game4Ukraine
- Global Tour for Peace
