= Abbey Green =

Abbey Green may refer to:

- Abbey Green (footballer), an Australian rules football player
- Abbey Green, Shropshire, England
- Abbey Green, Staffordshire Moorlands, Staffordshire, England
- Abbey Green ward, a former electoral ward of Stoke-on-Trent, Staffordshire, England
- Lesmahagow, a town in Scotland
- Abbeygreen Church, a church in the town of Lesmahagow, Scotland
