= Jonathan Wilkes =

English actor and singer (born 1978)

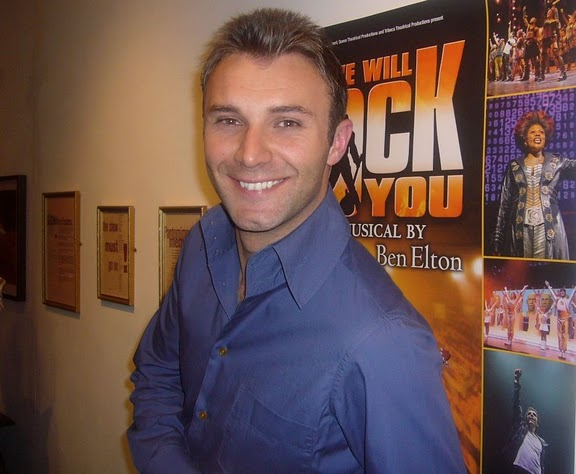
- Wilkes in 2010
- Born: 1 August 1978 (age 48); Baddeley Green, Stoke-on-Trent, Staffordshire, England
- Occupations: Entertainer, singer, presenter
- Spouse: Nikki Wheeler (m. 2004)
- Children: 2

Jonathan Wilkes (born 1 August 1978) is an English television presenter and singer.

== Early life and career ==
Jonathan Wilkes was born in Baddeley Green, Stoke-on-Trent, to Eileen Wilkes and Graham Wilkes, and spent most of his childhood in Packmoor, an outlying village of Chell. He resided near the home of Robbie Williams, with whom he is best friends. He has one older sister called Kay. He signed for Port Vale FC, aged seven, and played for Everton FC as a teenager. He said that he was dropped from the team due to his "unwillingness to eat, sleep and breathe football".

His first stage role was in a Stoke Amateur Operatic Society production of Hans Christian Andersen.

In 1996, he won the Cameron Mackintosh Young Entertainer of the Year Award. From this, he went on to work in Blackpool under the name 'Jonathan and the Space Girls', until being spotted by Kevin Bishop of the BBC, who employed him as a presenter for the precursor channel to BBC3. He has since gone on to work in West End Musicals, and has presented You've Been Framed!.

After signing a record deal with Virgin, Wilkes had a brief spell as a pop-music singer, his single "Just Another Day" reached No. 24 in the UK Singles Chart. The single hit the Top 5 in 18 countries worldwide. During his brief singing career, he performed with his friend Robbie Williams at the Royal Albert Hall and sang "Me And My Shadow" together which received positive reviews. However, Wilkes later opted to stop making music in order to move back into TV and stage work, the latter being his biggest passion, of which he often works with Robbie Williams.

Since 2005 Wilkes has been a regular performer in pantomimes at the Regent Theatre, Stoke-on-Trent.

== Soccer Aid ==
Wilkes participates and assists in the organisation of Soccer Aid, an event he has been involved in since 2006, in collaboration with co-founder and friend Robbie Williams.

To date, the event has raised over £100 million for UNICEF.

Wilkes’ last appearance on the pitch on match day came in 2017 owing to a recurring hamstring injury, but is still heavily involved in the organisation and promotion of the event.

== Personal life ==
Wilkes attended City of Stoke-on-Trent Sixth Form College. He is a boyhood fan of Port Vale.

While working for the BBC, he lived in London. Also while at the BBC, he met his wife Nikki. The couple live in Royal Wootton Bassett.

In September 2013, Wilkes opened his own full-time performing arts college called Wilkes Academy. The patrons of the academy include Ant and Dec, and Arlene Phillips. The college is based in Swindon.

== Discography ==
=== Single ===
| Year | Title | Chart positions |
| Year | Title | UK |
|---|---|---|
| 2001 | "Just Another Day" | 24 |

| Preceded by Lisa Riley | Host of You've Been Framed! 2003–2004 | Succeeded by Harry Hill |
