= Baddeley Green =

Village in Staffordshire, England

Coordinates: 53.060°N 02.135°W

- Location within Staffordshire
- OS grid reference: SJ9051
- Shire county: Staffordshire
- Region: West Midlands
- Country: England
- Sovereign state: United Kingdom
- Post town: STOKE-ON-TRENT
- Postcode district: ST2
- Dialling code: 01782
- Police: Staffordshire
- Fire: Staffordshire
- Ambulance: West Midlands

Baddeley Green is an area of Stoke-on-Trent, Staffordshire, England.

Baddeley Green is part of the Abbey Green ward, which covers the areas of Baddeley Green, Milton and Abbey Hulton as well as Baddeley Edge and Light Oaks.
