= Just Another Day (Jonathan Wilkes song) =

"Just another day"

Single by Jonathan Wilkes
- B-side: "Love Me Like You Do"
- Released: 5 March 2001
- Recorded: London
- Genre: Pop,
- Length: 3:55
- Label: Virgin
- Songwriters: Jonathan Wilkes, Eliot Kennedy

"Just Another Day" is a song by Jonathan Wilkes, released in March 2001.

The single was written by Jonathan and songwriter Eliot Kennedy.

Released on Virgin's Innocent Records, the single underperformed on the UK Singles Chart reaching 24 in the charts.

The single was deemed a failure by Virgin who were expecting a Top 10 hit.

Following the singles poor chart performance it was announced he had been axed by the label in July 2001, and his subsequent album release was cancelled.
