= Abbey Green ward =

Former electoral ward of Stoke-on-Trent, Staffordshire, England

Coordinates: 53.0420°N 2.1350°W

Abbey Green was an electoral ward of Stoke-on-Trent. The ward covered the areas of Baddeley Green, Milton and Abbey Hulton as well as Baddeley Edge and Light Oaks. It ceased to exist as a result of the 2011 reorganisation of electoral wards in Stoke-on-Trent.

The area is bound by the A5009 Leek Road and the East Valley and Northwood & Birches Head wards in the north and west, The city boundary to the east, and The Berryhill & Hanley East and Bentilee & Townsend wards to the south. Divided by the Carmountside cemetery site the ward comprises the two distinct areas of Abbey Hulton, typified by large areas of council-owned semi-detached housing; and Baddeley Green, typified by large areas of privately owned semi-detached housing.

== Demographics ==
The population of Abbey Green at the 2001 census was 11,652 over an area of 447.35 hectares, meaning the population density / hectare was 26.05.

The mean age of the population during the 2001 census was 40.4, which is higher than the average for the rest of the city as well as for England and Wales (which were 38.5 and 38.7 respectively).

98.9% of the population of the Abbey Green ward was White British, which is much higher than the national average for England and Wales.

The average household income for the area was £22,418 in 2005, which was much less than that of the rest of England and Wales at the time (c. £31,000).
