= Joe Wicks (coach) =

British fitness coach, television presenter and author (born 1985)

Joe Wicks MBE
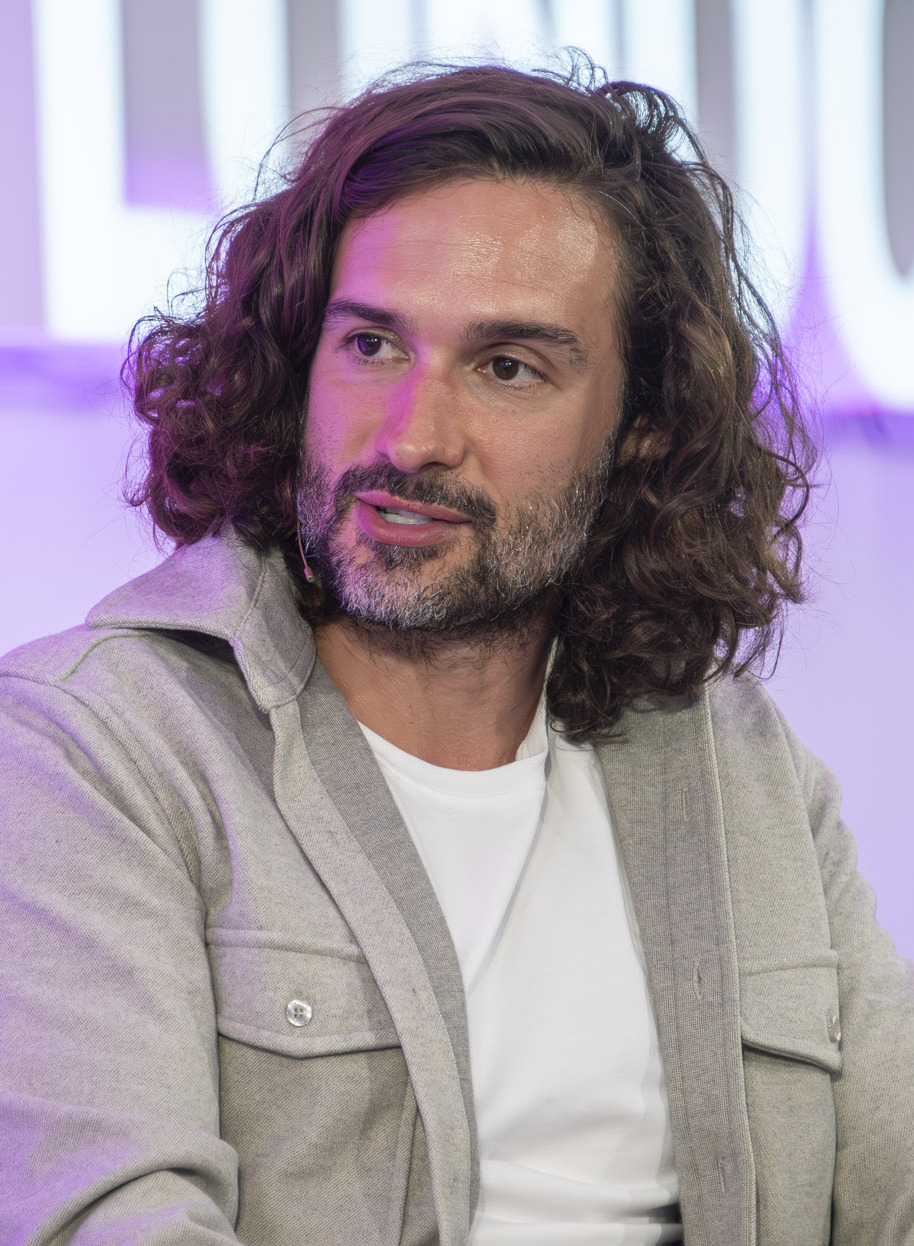
- Wicks in 2025
- Born: Joseph Trevor Wicks; 21 September 1985 (age 41); Epsom, Surrey, England
- Education: St Mary's University, Twickenham
- Occupation: Coach
- Spouse: Rosie Jones (m. 2019)
- Children: 4
- Website: www.thebodycoach.co.uk

Joseph Trevor Wicks (born 21 September 1985), also known as The Body Coach, is a British fitness coach, television presenter, social media personality and author. His fitness method uses High Intensity Interval Training (HIIT) workouts. Starting off by posting 15-second recipe videos on social media, Wicks grew his brand to become one of the most followed fitness accounts on Instagram and YouTube.

His first published cookbook Lean in 15: 15-minute meals was a best-seller in 2015, having sold over 900,000 copies. He has created a "90 Day Plan" with workouts and meals with portions tailored to the individual. Wicks was awarded a Guinness World Record for "most viewers for a fitness workout live stream on YouTube", after achieving over 950,000 viewers on 24 March 2020 for his second live stream.

== Early life ==
Wicks was born in Epsom, Surrey to Gary Wicks, a roofer, and Raquel Mosquera, a social worker of Spanish and Italian descent. He grew up on a council estate in Ewell with his parents and two brothers, Nikki and George. Wicks attended Blenheim High School in Epsom, Surrey and NESCOT technology college in Ewell. He went on to study sports science at St Mary's University in Twickenham.

== Career ==
Wicks worked as a teaching assistant after completing his sports science degree. After realising it was not his ideal job, he became a personal trainer for the next five years. In 2012, he appeared as a contestant on the Channel 4 game show The Bank Job. He went out first after being the only player left in the vault when the time ran out. A segment on Channel 4 named Joe Wicks: The Body Coach aired in 2016 with Wicks as the presenter. As of 2020 there have been 3 episodes. Wicks launched a range of kitchenware in 2018. In 2024, Wicks caused controversy by saying that ADHD is caused by diet.

=== Online presence ===
Wicks began to gain traction for his fitness- and nutrition-related content on social media. In 2014 he began posting videos to Instagram relating to workouts and nutrition advice. He has amassed over 4.7 million followers on his Instagram account. He launched a website called The Body Coach where he sells his kitchenware and a range of fitness/nutrition plans. Wicks has been recognised by several major publications, such as Harper's Bazaar, Elle UK and Forbes for his online fitness efforts.

=== YouTube ===
He began posting fitness content to his YouTube channel, named 'The Body Coach TV', in 2014. His first video garnered over 6 million views. The channel has amassed over 2.7 million subscribers and more than 282 million views. Wicks also topped both the YouTube charts as the number one trending and breakout creator of the year. During the COVID-19 pandemic in 2020, he began "PE with Joe" on YouTube to try to help children stay active; this livestream had a wide impact and was viewed by over a million users worldwide. The first stream occurred on 23 March and ended almost one year later, on 5 March. For this, he was awarded his MBE in the Birthday Honours of 2020. He is a Channel 4 television presenter with his own show The Body Coach.

On 28 January 2023 Joe Wicks hosted a 5K fun run at Nonsuch Park. It was attended by celebrities including fellow YouTube personalities Matthew Houghton and Alex Gurteen.

=== Books ===
In 2015, Wicks published a cookbook named Lean in 15: The Shift Plan which sold 77,000 copies in its opening week. He released a further two books in the Lean in 15 series, including Lean in 15: The Shape Plan, released 2016 and "Lean in 15: The Sustain Plan", also in 2016. Since the success of the Lean in 15 series, Wicks has published several more cookbooks.

=== Charity ===
In November 2020, Wicks completed a 24-hour workout challenge which raised over £2 million for Children in Need. Blue Peter awarded him a Gold Blue Peter Badge as a thank you on behalf of Children in Need. In June 2021, Wicks became Patron of The Amber Foundation, a youth homeless charity. Surrey-born Wicks first became aware of The Amber Foundation after his mother, a social worker, started to work with some of the residents at their site near Dorking in Surrey. Since then, Wicks has visited the centre on a number of occasions, donating fitness equipment and giving advice on physical activity and nutrition.

=== Television ===
In January 2025, Wicks appeared as an investor on British product-pitching reality show Dragons' Den.

In October 2025, Wicks appeared in the Channel 4 documentary Joe Wicks: Licensed to Kill in which he created a protein bar from legal ingredients he claimed were dangerous. This received criticism from sectors within the UK food and wellbeing industries as fear-mongering.

== Personal life ==
Wicks married former glamour model Rosie Jones in June 2019. Together they have four children—a daughter born July 2018, a son born December 2019, a second daughter born September 2022 and a second son born June 2024. They live in Kingston upon Thames.

== Bibliography ==
Year	Title	Publisher	ISBN
2015	Lean in 15 - The Shift Plan: 15 Minute Meals and Workouts to Keep You Lean and Healthy	Pan Macmillan	ISBN 978-1-5098-0066-7 (Paperback, 224 pages)
2016	Lean in 15 - The Shape Plan: 15 Minute Meals With Workouts to Build a Strong, Lean Body	Pan Macmillan	ISBN 978-1-5098-0069-8 (Paperback, 240 pages)
2016	Lean in 15 - The Sustain Plan: 15 Minute Meals and Workouts to Get You Lean for Life	Pan Macmillan	ISBN 978-1-5098-2022-1 (Paperback, 240 pages)
2017	The Fat Loss Plan:100 Quick and Easy Recipes With Workouts	Pan Macmillan	ISBN 978-1-5098-3607-9 (Paperback, 240 pages)
2017	Cooking for Family and Friends: 100 Lean Recipes to Enjoy Together	Pan Macmillan	ISBN 978-1-5098-2025-2 (Hardback, 240 pages)
2018	Joe's 30 Minute Meals: 100 Quick and Healthy Recipes	Pan Macmillan	ISBN 978-1-78517-512-1 (Hardback, 240 pages)
2018	Veggie Lean in 15: 15-minute Veggie Meals with Workouts	Pan Macmillan	ISBN 978-1-5098-5615-2 (Paperback, 240 pages)
2019	Veggie BBQ: 10 Brand-new Lean in 15 Recipes	Pan Macmillan	ISBN 978-1-5098-5617-6 (E-book, 32 pages)
2020	Wean In 15: A book of baby meals	Pan Macmillan	ISBN 978-1-5290-1633-8 (Hardback, 240 pages)
2020	30 Day Kick Start Plan	Pan Macmillan	ISBN 978-1-5098-5618-3 (Paperback, 272 pages)
2021	Joe's Family Food: 100 Delicious, Easy Recipes to Enjoy Together	Pan Macmillan	ISBN 978-1529016314 (Hardback, 240 pages)
2022	Feel Good Food	HQ	ISBN 978-0008430382 (Hardback, 304 pages)
2025	Protein in 15	Leap	ISBN 978-1785128547 (Hardback, 224 pages)
