= Bagnall Road Wood =

Nature reserve in Stoke-on-Trent, UK

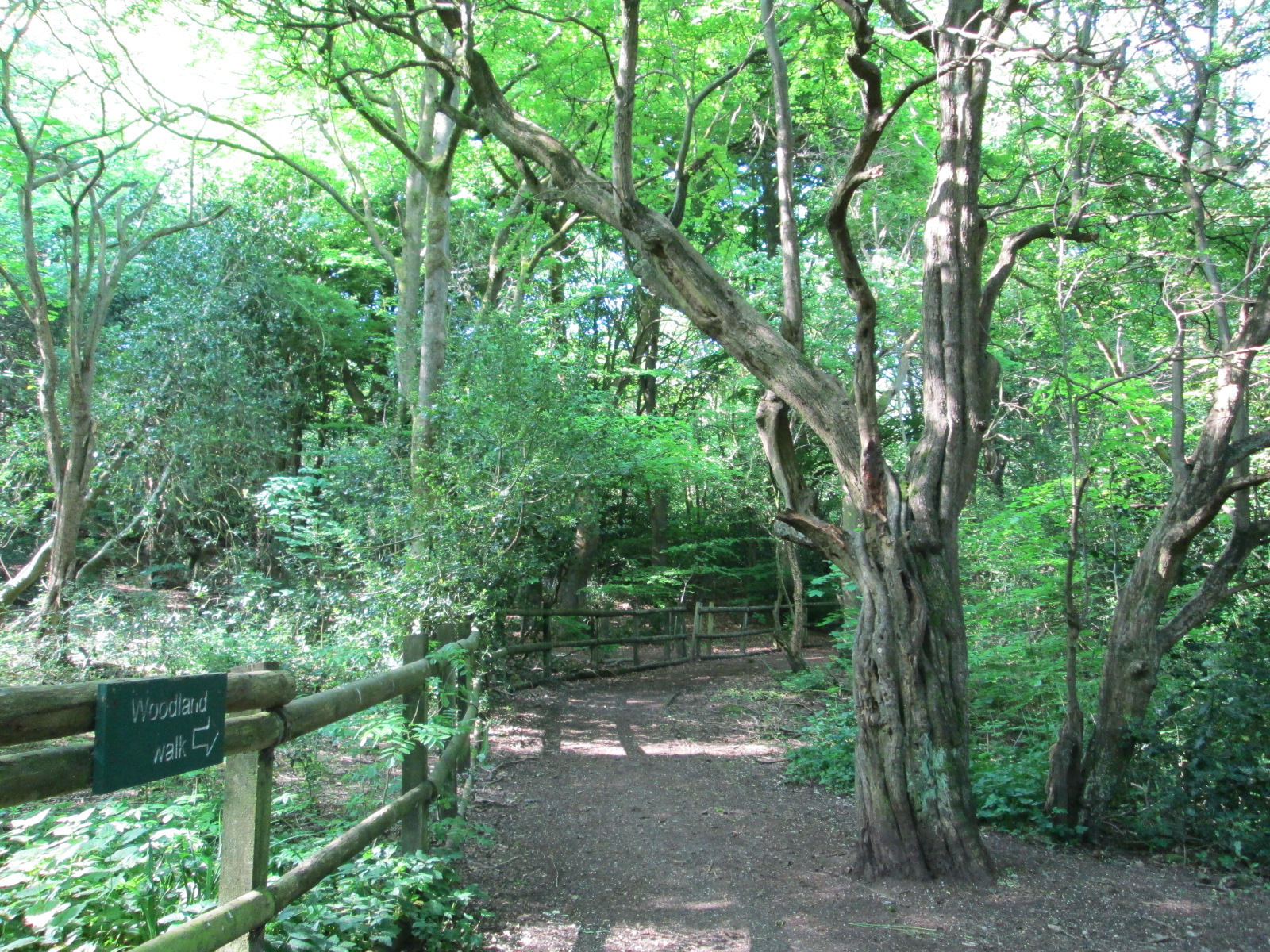
- Woodland walk

- Location within Staffordshire
- Interactive map of Bagnall Road Wood
- Location: Near Milton, Staffordshire
- OS grid: SJ 912 501
- Coordinates: 53°2′54″N 2°7′58″W
- Area: 6.11 hectares (15.1 acres)
- Operator: Stoke-on-Trent City Council
- Designation: Local nature reserve
- Website: Bagnall Road Wood

Bagnall Road Wood is a local nature reserve near Milton, on the eastern fringe of Stoke-on-Trent, England.

== History and description ==
The site was a tree nursery in the 19th century. There are mostly deciduous trees, including beech, hornbeam and oak. Less common trees include black poplar.

The wood, of area 6.11 hectares (15.1 acres), was designated a local nature reserve (LNR) in 2004. It is owned and managed by Stoke-on-Trent City Council.
