= Milton, Staffordshire =

Area of Stoke-on-Trent, England

Coordinates: 53.050°N 2.142°W

Milton
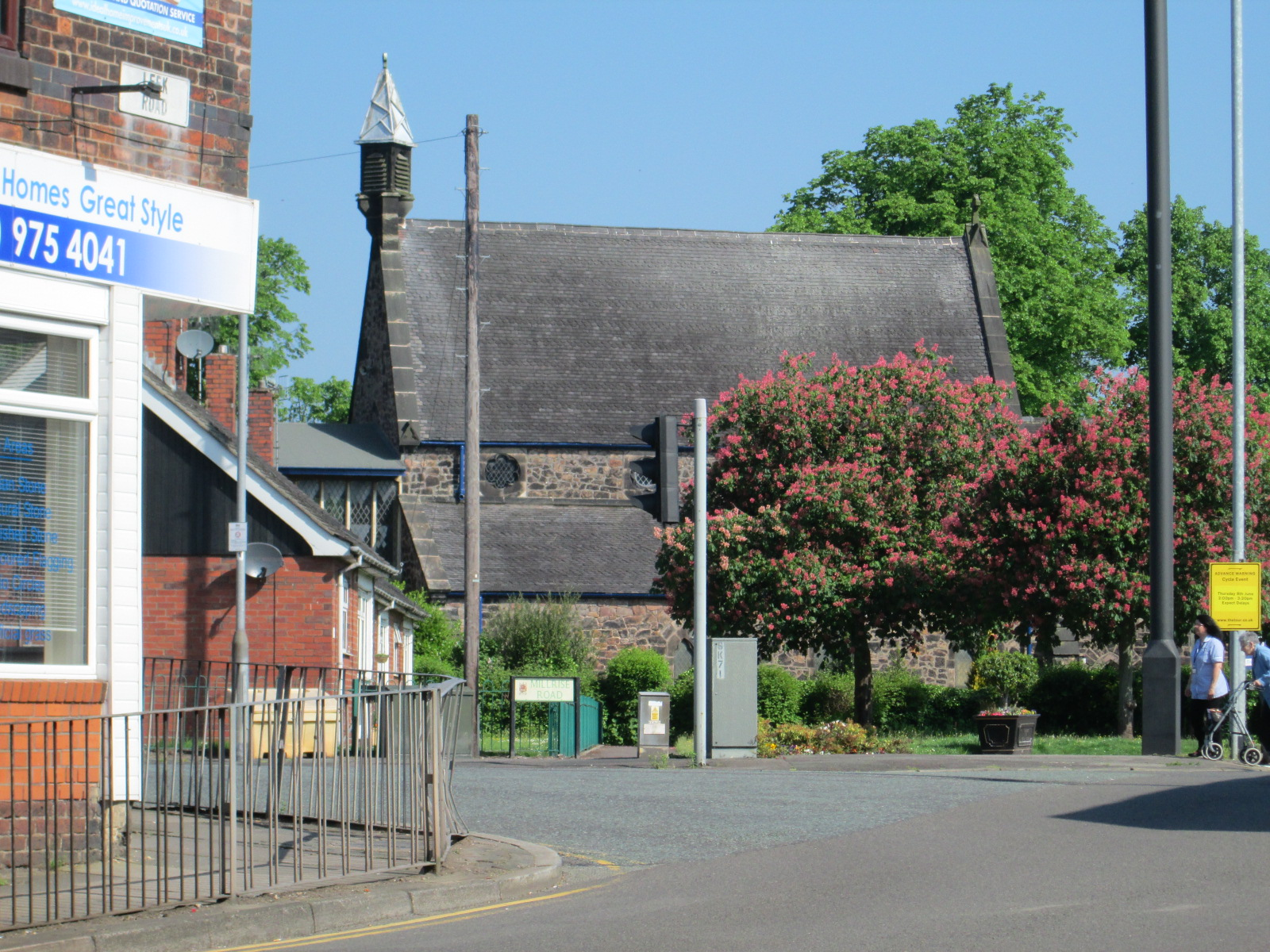
- Church of St Philip and St James, at the junction of Leek Road and Millrise Road

- Location within Staffordshire
- Population: 17,250 (2011 census, ward, Baddeley, Milton and Norton)
- OS grid reference: SJ910505
  - London: 162.4 mi (262 km) SSE
- Unitary authority: Stoke-on-Trent
- Ceremonial county: Staffordshire
- Region: West Midlands
- Country: England
- Sovereign state: United Kingdom
- Post town: Stoke on Trent
- Postcode district: ST2
- Dialling code: 01782
- Police: Staffordshire
- Fire: Staffordshire
- Ambulance: West Midlands
- UK Parliament: Stoke North

Milton is an area of Stoke-on-Trent, in the ceremonial county of Staffordshire, England. It is mainly situated between the A5009 and A53 roads. It shares its borders with Light Oaks, Baddeley Green, Sneyd Green and Abbey Hulton.

Milton is part of the Baddeley Green, Milton and Norton ward of Stoke-on-Trent City Council.

Bagnall Road Wood, a local nature reserve, is a short distance east of the village.

== History ==
The name Milton derived from the Old English terms 'Mill tun' and reflects the many mills that were in operation in the 19th century.

In 1777, the Caldon Canal running through Milton was built and was important to the village's later development. It allowed packing houses for finished pottery to be constructed adjacent to the canal.

From the late 19th century Milton had a number of industries. Prominent among these was Bullers Ltd who established a new factory at Milton in 1920. Bullers were manufacturers of electrical porcelain. There were also aluminium works, the British Aluminium Company, and chemical works, Josiah Hardman Ltd, at Milton. The Hardman Institute, which included a reading room, was established in 1895 by Josiah Hardman.

=== Railway ===
The opening of the railway from Milton to Cheddleton in 1867 (part of the North Staffordshire Railway) extended Milton's transport infrastructure and provided the village with a local station. Part of the platform of Milton railway station still remains, as do the original tracks, running adjacent to the Caldon Canal.

== Economy ==
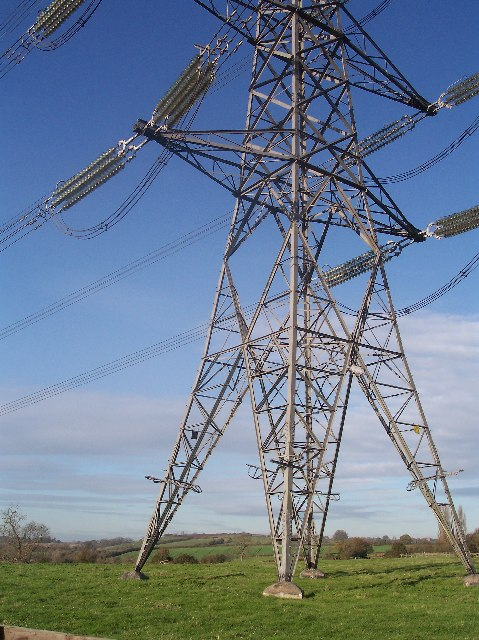
Gloucestershire pylons in November 2005

Allied Insulators, on Leek New Road, was a main manufacturer of insulating bushings for electricity pylons and switchgear in substations. It was known as electrical porcelain. It had bought Taylor Tunnicliff in 1959. Fairey Group bought the company in 1985 for £2.5m, with Doulton Insulators at Tamworth, Staffordshire. The Milton site closed in 2001, but the company now makes insulators elsewhere in Tunstall.

== Civil parish ==
Milton was formerly a chapelry in the parish of Norton-in-the Moors, from 31 December 1894 Milton was a civil parish in its own right, on 1 April 1922 the parish was abolished and merged with Stoke-on-Trent. In 1921 the parish had a population of 2748.
