= For What It's Worth (game show) =

- Genre: Antiques game show
- Presented by: Fern Britton
- Country of origin: United Kingdom
- Original language: English
- No. of series: 2
- No. of episodes: 48

Production
- Production location: Dock10 studios
- Running time: 45 minutes
- Production company: Tuesday's Child

Original release
- Network: BBC One
- Release: 4 January – 26 June 2016

For What It's Worth is an antiques game show that aired on BBC One from 4 January to 26 June 2016. It is hosted by Fern Britton. From the second series, it was recorded in front of an audience.

== Format ==
The game starts with three pairs of contestants, each with a picker and a quizzer; in series one they saw an array of sixteen antiques, whereas in series two twelve are laid out, of which one is "worthless" (£10 or less) and one is worth £2,500. These values are worked out by the guest and an independent value based on auction price (without added costs). They are then examined by the contestants, and then arranged in a 4x4 grid.

=== Round 1 ===
Britton asks general knowledge questions. If a quizzer buzzes in correctly, they may pick a lot from the grid, but if they buzz wrongly, they are wallied. In the first series, there were ten questions, and they pick their lot after answering a question correctly; in the second series, there are eight and the pickers pick their lot before the question is answered. At the end of this round, each team is handed a fact from the resident expert for an object of their choice.

=== Round 2 ===
Two categories are allocated to each lot: one based on its horizontal placement, and another based on its vertical placement. Pickers then pick a lot, with the quizzer then answering a question in either category to try and secure it. In series one each pair is asked three questions, with the third question for each containing the possibility to steal from an opponent's collection; in series two, each pair is asked two questions, with the second question containing this possibility. In both series, if they elect to steal, the target quizzer may then pick a category from any of the eight for the stealer to answer. They must not empty a team's collection in this round. Once this round is over, the couple with the lowest valued collection is eliminated and their lots' values revealed. Any lots still on the board are removed and their values revealed. Each couple then elects another lot to hear more about, and then the couple with the most is revealed.

=== Round 3 ===
In series 1, surviving pairs were both given a category, for example "Name landlords in EastEnders' Queen Vic". The quizzers then volleyed answers until one fails to give an answer or repeats one already given. The winning picker then steals a lot from their opponents' collection, and unlike Round 2, collections may be emptied. This process happened three times, with the team in the lead at the start of the round going first in the first and third volleys; the team with the lowest total values at the end of the round is eliminated. In series 2, a dozen answers were laid out, of which nine were correct; whichever team picks one of the three wrong answers has an item of theirs stolen.

=== Round 4 ===
In the final round, the picker picks one item to win. The rest of the lots' values are then revealed. They are not told the value of the item they have picked unless it is the top lot or the worthless lot. They are then offered the chance to swap it with the value of another lot which may be more than the top lot's value; the value of the lot they pick is what they go home with.

== Experts ==
Britton is assisted each week by an antiques expert: Kate Bliss, Charles Hanson, David Harper, Paul Laidlaw, Anita Manning, Natasha Raskin, or Charlie Ross

== Transmissions ==
| Series | Start date | End date | Episodes |
|---|---|---|---|
| 1 | 4 January 2016 | 5 February 2016 | 25 |
| 2 | 23 May 2016 | 26 June 2016 | 23 |
