= David Barby =

British antiques expert

- Born: 23 April 1943; Rugby, Warwickshire, England
- Died: 25 July 2012 (aged 69); Coventry, West Midlands, England
- Occupations: Antiques expert; Television personality
- Years active: 1990–2012
- Television: Antiques Road Trip; Bargain Hunt; Flog It!

David John Barby, FRICS (23 April 1943 – 25 July 2012) was an English antiques expert, known for his appearances on Bargain Hunt, Flog It! and similar BBC antiques television programmes.

== Career ==
Born in Rugby, Warwickshire, he was interested in antiques from age 12, which led to his joining the profession on leaving school. He qualified aged 21 as a member of the Incorporated Society of Valuers and Auctioneers, which merged with the Royal Institution of Chartered Surveyors in 2000.

Barby started working for a local firm in Rugby, before leaving to work in London in 1974. He was head hunted by Royal Leamington Spa-based auction house Locke and England, and he joined them in 1978 as a manager and valuer. He later became a partner, retiring from the business in 2003. Barby was an expert on "everything from Victorian porcelain to antique oak pedestal desks".

Barby started his own independent valuation business, Hillmorton-based David J. Barby and Associates, in the 1990s, where he still worked at the time of his death. As an auctioneer, his affable manner made him popular, particularly with those bidding. His great success in October 2000 was the sale of a £1 million collection.

The Royal Leamington Society marked its Jubilee Year in 2006 with an "Evening with David Barby on Images of the 50s", at the Town Hall in Leamington Spa, Warwickshire. Similar evenings with Barby were held at Snitterfield Village Hall, Stratford-upon-Avon and other locations.

Barby was well known for the charity work that he carried out, as a fundraiser for the Leamington Spa Hospital and Leamington Art Gallery. He was also president of the Friends of Leamington Spa Art Gallery and Museum.

Barby gave a series of lectures on antiques with humorous stories of the antiques business. He gave lectures to groups such as NADFAS, Women's Institutes, and historical and arts societies, as well as on cruise ships.

Barby was the subject of the July 2007 newsletter article, "My Life in Antiques", based on a speech he gave to the UK Belleek Collectors' Group Spring Meeting in 2007.

Barby gave much time in sharing stories, memories, nostalgia, and passion for old things with members of the public. Charles Hanson, a friend of Barby said, "more important he is a man of the people".

== Television ==
Barby appeared in the first episode of Flog It! in 2002 as the auctioneer, but was soon also employed as an expert. He was already becoming well known in a similar role on Bargain Hunt, and later appeared on Antiques Road Trip, where he became known by the nickname "The Master". Barby featured in the 500th show of the BBC programme Bargain Hunt on the red team alongside Philip Serrell.

Barby also appeared in episode 1 of the TV Series Housecall on 4 February 2002.

He appeared to fall in Widemarsh Street, Hereford in 2012 while filming an episode of the Antiques Road Trip. In 2011 and 2012, there were other reports of him having minor facial injuries, viewed on television.

Barby was an ambassador of antiques on television. Following his death, Bargain Hunt paid tribute to Barby in an episode broadcast on 1 October 2012, with a montage of his appearances shown at the end of the programme. A similar montage by Antiques Road Trip was shown on 5 October 2012.

== Politics ==
Barby stood in the Caldecott district of Rugby in 2002 as a prospective Conservative councillor, but came fourth in a ward which elected only three councillors. He took part in fundraising events such as 'Antiques Evening with David Barby' for the Solihull Conservative Association.

== Death and tributes ==
Barby suffered a stroke at his home in Rugby on 13 July 2012, and he died two weeks later on 25 July 2012 in a hospital in Coventry, aged 69. Over 500 people attended a memorial service at St Andrew's Church, Rugby on 2 September 2012. A tribute was given by Philip Serrell. Tributes were also made by the BBC, TV programme Flog It, and Presenter Tim Wonnacott. Wonnacott expressed his shock on behalf of the team at Bargain Hunt and spoke of his high standards and professionalism as an expert, and also his sense of humour and sense of fun. Barby was buried at Watts Lane Cemetery, Hillmorton, in Rugby, Warwickshire.
