= Mark Stacey =

Welsh auctioneer and valuer

- Born: 23 September 1964 (age 61); Neath, Wales
- Occupation: auctioneer

Mark Stacey (born 23 September 1964) is a Welsh valuer and auctioneer. He is also a TV personality and has made regular appearances on BBC programmes as an antique expert.

== Biography and professional career ==
Stacey was born in Neath, Glamorgan, South Wales. He moved to London and worked for the Bonhams and Sotheby's auction houses. He then became head of Decorative Arts and later Director of Hamptons / Dreweatt Neate Fine Art.

Stacey has made regular appearances as an antiques expert on the BBC programmes Bargain Hunt, Flog It!, Put Your Money Where Your Mouth Is and Antiques Road Trip. In June 2009 Stacey took part in a light-hearted interview on the BBC lunchtime programme Daily Politics where he was asked advice about the value of items owned by famous people, in the wake of the UK Parliament's expenses scandal.

In 2011 Stacey opened an antiques shop in Kemptown, Brighton, East Sussex.

In 2014 Stacey became an auctioneer and valuer with Reeman Dansie auctioneers in Colchester, Essex. While there, he found an ancient Egyptian sarcophagus, propped up in an Essex house, which sold for £13,500.

== Personal life ==
Stacey has one brother and two sisters. He worked as a residential social worker before entering the antiques trade, initially as a dealer before working with several auction houses. Stacey is a talented organist and occasionally plays at his local Methodist church. He gave an interview in the October 1997 edition of Organists' Review.
