= Saga Entertainment =

British record label

- Founded: 2017; 8 years ago
- Founder: Grahame, Jack Corbyn
- Status: Active
- Distributor(s): Sony Music
- Genre: Rock, pop
- Country of origin: United Kingdom
- Location: London
- Official website: www.sagaentertainment.tv

Saga Entertainment is an independent record label, based in London, founded in 2017 by music producers Grahame and Jack Corbyn. Artists on the label include Sam Bailey, Bargain Hunt, Shona McGarty and the Celebs, a supergroup of celebrities including Frank Bruno, Shona McGarty, Kara Tointon and Lionel Blair.

== History ==
Saga Entertainment was founded in 2017 to release "Sleigh Ride", a charity single performed by BBC antique experts Charlie Ross, James Braxton, Philip Serrell and Charles Hanson. The single was produced by Grahame and Jack Corbyn in aid of Children in Need and released under the artist name Bargain Hunt. The music video for the single was broadcast on both Christmas specials of the show.

In November 2018, the label released an original Christmas song called "Rock with Rudolph" which was to be the debut single from celebrity supergroup The Celebs. The song was written and produced by Grahame and Jack Corbyn and released in aid of Great Ormond Street Hospital and was released digitally on 30 November 2018. It included vocals by Kara Tointon, Shona McGarty, Lionel Blair and Laura Tobin. The music video debuted with The Sun on 29 November 2018 and had its first TV showing on Good Morning Britain on 30 November 2018.

"Rock with Rudolph" was followed up by another single by the Celebs; this time, Saga Entertainment recruited Frank Bruno and X Factor winner Sam Bailey. Amid the COVID-19 crisis with the intention to raise money for both Alzheimer's Society and Action for Children, they recorded a new rendition of "Merry Christmas Everyone" by Shakin' Stevens, released digitally on 11 December 2020 and including vocals by Kellie Shirley, Toby Anstis, Faye Barker, The Sacconejolys and others. The music video debuted on Good Morning Britain the day before release.

In 2021, Sam Bailey signed a record deal with Saga Entertainment; the first single resulting from this deal was released on 6 August 2021, a cover of the Alannah Myles hit single "Black Velvet".

Later the same year, Saga Entertainment reunited with The Celebs to record a cover of The Beatles classic "Let It Be", a song produced by Grahame and Jack Corbyn assisted by Stephen Large. The song was recorded at Metropolis Studios, in support of Mind (charity) and released on 3 December 2021. Saga Entertainment recruited Shona McGarty to sing the lead vocal backed by The Celebs which included Georgia Hirst, Anne Hegerty, Ivan Kaye and Eunice Olumide, amongst others.

In January 2022 Saga Entertainment followed up Sam Bailey's Rock debut with a cover of Stevie Nicks' "Edge Of Seventeen"; the song was accompanied by an animated music video.

"Edge Of Seventeen" was swiftly followed up in April with a cover of Meat Loaf's rock ballad "I'd Do Anything for Love (But I Won't Do That)"; this release was also accompanied by an animated music video. The song was produced by Grahame and Jack Corbyn at Metropolis Studios, leading lady of Bat Out of Hell: The Musical Christina Bennington was recruited on backing vocals.

In July 2022, Saga Entertainment became manager to Jo O'Meara with Jack Corbyn as her personal manager.

In September 2022, Saga Entertainment brought The Celebs back together to mark the 40th anniversary of the Michael Jackson classic album Thriller and raise money for Great Ormond Street Hospital, with a new rendition of the title track, this year The Celebs were led by Jo O'Meara and the single was produced by Grahame and Jack Corbyn. Lending their vocals include Ivan Kaye, Anne Hegerty, Tyger Drew-Honey, Faye Barker and others. The music video debuted with Daily Mail on 30 September 2022

In August 2023, Saga Entertainment gathered back The Celebs for another charity single in support of Great Ormond Street Hospital with an original song called So Delicious, the song was written by songwriting team Grahame & Jack Corbyn, Stephen Large & Amanda Bell. Produced by Grahame & Jack Corbyn, the song was released on 15 December 2023. It included vocals from Anne Hegerty, The Times top 100 influencer Tamara Kalinic, Faye Barker, Isabel Hodgins, Laura Tobin, Melinda Messenger, Shelby Tribble from The Only Way Is Essex, Emily Faye Miller from Too Hot to Handle (TV series), Ivan Kaye, TikTok stars, amongst others.

The company manages Ivan Kaye, Jo O'Meara, James Braxton and others.

== Artists ==
=== Current ===
- Jo O'Meara
- The Celebs
- Sam Bailey
- Shona McGarty

=== Past ===
- Bargain Hunt

== Discography ==
- Bargain Hunt – "Sleigh Ride" (2017)
- The Celebs – "Rock with Rudolph" (2018)
- The Celebs – "Merry Christmas Everyone" (2020)
- Sam Bailey – "Black Velvet" (2021)
- Shona McGarty & The Celebs – "Let It Be" (2021)
- Sam Bailey – "Edge Of Seventeen" (2022)
- Sam Bailey – "I'd Do Anything for Love (But I Won't Do That)" (2022)
- Jo O'Meara & The Celebs – "Thriller" (2022)
- The Celebs – "So Delicious" (2023)
- The Celebs – "All You Need Is Love" (2024)

== See also ==
List of independent UK record labels
