= Christina Trevanion =

British auctioneer and TV personality

- Born: Christina Helen Johanne Bebbington; 12 June 1981 (age 45); England
- Education: Southampton Solent University
- Occupations: Auctioneer, television presenter
- Television: Antiques Road Trip, Bargain Hunt; Flog It!, The Travelling Auctioneers
- Children: 2

Christina Helen Johanne Trevanion (born 12 June 1981) is a British auctioneer and television presenter.

She is the owner of Trevanion Auctioneers and Valuers, based in Whitchurch, Shropshire. Trevanion originally founded the firm with Aaron Dean, having previously worked at Christie's.

She has appeared on a number of BBC daytime television programmes as an expert in antiques and as an auctioneer, including Bargain Hunt, Antiques Road Trip, Put Your Money Where Your Mouth Is and Flog It!.

She has also presented the BBC's The Travelling Auctioneers along with Will Kirk and JJ Chalmers.

== Early life and education ==
Trevanion attended Southampton Solent University after completing her secondary education at Bishop Heber High School in Malpas, Cheshire.

== Personal life ==
Trevanion is married, with two daughters.
