= Izzie Balmer =

English auctioneer and antiques TV presenter

- Born: c. 1989; Derbyshire, England
- Education: Durham University (BA Geography)
- Occupations: Auctioneer, valuer, television presenter
- Known for: Antiques Road Trip; Bargain Hunt; The Travelling Auctioneers

Izzie Balmer (born 1989) is an English auctioneer, valuer, and television presenter on the BBC daytime shows Antiques Road Trip, Bargain Hunt, and The Travelling Auctioneers. She is a specialist in jewellery and silver.

== Early life and education ==
Balmer was born in Derbyshire, England, around 1989 and grew up in Quarndon. She played the viola with the National Youth Orchestra of Great Britain from the age of 16 and graduated from Durham University with a degree in Geography. Following her degree, Balmer was unsure of her career path. Her mother suggested she take a work experience placement at a local auction house, which led to a full-time position.

Balmer later trained as a gemmologist and earned diplomas in both gemmology (FGA) and diamonds (DGA) from the Gemmological Association of Great Britain.

== Career ==
Balmer began her career at Hansons Auctioneers, in Derbyshire, where she worked for four and a half years before moving to Wiltshire. From 2018 to 2023, she served as Head Valuer and Auctioneer at Wessex Auction Rooms. She became a freelance valuer, auctioneer, and presenter in 2024, and began a consultancy role with Clevedon Salerooms.

Balmer's television career began when she stood in for her boss Charles Hanson on Bargain Hunt. She was later cast as a co-presenter on the BBC's Street Auction. In 2019, she joined the cast of Antiques Road Trip and has also appeared on its celebrity version. She is also a co-presenter on The Travelling Auctioneers. She has also appeared in Flog It!, Make Me A Dealer, and Curiosity.

== Recognition ==
Balmer has won the following awards:

Awards and achievements
Year	Award or achievement	Award body	Notes
2019	Named one of the "30 Under 30 Rising Stars"	Antiques Trade Gazette	
2020	Nominated for the "Young Achiever of the Year" award	National Association of Valuers and Auctioneers	
