= Raj Bisram =

English antiques expert and auctioneer

- Occupation(s): Auctioneer, antiques expert

Raj Bisram is an English antiques expert and auctioneer. He co-founded Bentley's Fine Art and Antiques Auction House in Cranbrook, Kent in 1995. He has appeared on several British TV programmes on antiques including Antiques Road Trip, Flog It!, Four Rooms, Posh Pawn, Celebrity Antiques Road Trip, Bargain Hunt, and Would I Lie To You?.

== Early life ==
He was born in London and attended Highgate School. He enlisted in the British Army where he became a physical training instructor in REME. He represented the British Army in competitive downhill skiing and the slalom. He qualified as an Austrian ski instructor and worked as a ski instructor in the resort of Ellmau in Tyrol. Bentley’s Antique & Fine Art Auctioneers was originally founded by Wilfred Wheaton and Bisram in 1995 as Cranbrook Auction Rooms.
