= Paul Laidlaw =

Scottish auctioneer (Born 8 July 1967)

- Born: July 1967; Edinburgh
- Education: University of Edinburgh
- Occupations: Auctioneer, television personality

Paul Laidlaw is a Scottish auctioneer, known for his appearances on television game-shows related to antiques.

== Early life ==
Laidlaw was born in Edinburgh, obtaining a degree in mathematics from the University of Edinburgh with a view to working for NASA.

== Career ==
Laidlaw developed a career as an auctioneer, joining H&H Auction Rooms of Carlisle in 2002, and leaving in 2012 to set up his own auction house, Laidlaw Auctioneers and Valuers.

In 2006 he was filmed for the BBC Television show Bargain Hunt, conducting an auction. He was subsequently asked to screen test for the show, and now makes regular appearances as an expert advisor, where his role is to assist a team of two lay people in competition with another team, who aim to make the most money by buying antiques and collectables, then selling them at auction. He also makes regular appearances on the sister show Antiques Road Trip, competing in a similar fashion against another expert, one-to-one, and appears in its celebrity spin-off version. He also appeared on Flog It!, and has been a guest on For What It's Worth.

As of May 2021, he holds the record for the biggest profit on an item on Antiques Road Trip. In a 2017 episode he purchased a Chambre Automatique De Bertsch sub-miniature camera for £60; it sold for a hammer price of £20,000, to a private collector in Switzerland. As with all profits on the show, the money made was donated to the charity Children in Need. In an earlier episode, screened in 2016, he purchased a Georgian drinking glass for £1, whose hammer price was £360.

== Personal life ==
Laidlaw lives in Carlisle. Among the antiques he collects for personal interest are arms and armour, Georgian glassware, Georgian silver, and watches.
