= Will Kirk =

British furniture restorer

- Born: 14 May 1985 (age 41)
- Education: University of the Arts London, London Metropolitan University
- Occupation: Furniture restorer
- Years active: 2010–present
- Known for: The Repair Shop
- Spouse: Polly Snowdon
- Children: 2

William Kirk (born 14 May 1985) is a British furniture restorer primarily known for his work on BBC's restoration programme The Repair Shop. He is an Ambassador of the Heritage Crafts Association.

== Education and early career ==
Kirk studied Graphic Design and Antique Furniture Restoration and Conservation at the University of the Arts London and London Metropolitan University. After graduating from university in 2010, Kirk went to Italy with the Worshipful Company of Painter-Stainers to represent the UK at the annual Salon Decorative Arts Fair.

Kirk is based in Wandsworth in London, having set up his own workshop there in 2012.

== Television work ==
Kirk first appeared on television in 2013 on Channel 4's The French Collection. He also appeared on the BBC's What To Buy and Why, but he became well known when he started to appear on The Repair Shop in 2017.

In October 2020, Kirk became a presenter on the BBC's new show Morning Live giving DIY advice.

In May 2021, Kirk was paired with fellow Repair Shop presenter Jay Blades on a celebrity special edition of Strike It Lucky.

In August 2021, Kirk was a participant on BBC's Celebrity MasterChef, but was the first competitor to leave, on the first day, after serving duck breast and sweet potato mash with tender stem broccoli and a red wine jus, but with raw duck, for the "Dinner Party Challenge".

From 31 October 2022, Kirk presented a new series titled The Travelling Auctioneers; he cohosted the series with Christina Trevanion. The series aired each weekday for three weeks. For the second series, he was replaced by a new team consisting of JJ Chalmers, Izzie Balmer and Robin Johnson.

== Personal life ==
Kirk married Polly Snowdon, an educational psychologist, on 7 August 2021, at the Kings Head Hotel in Cirencester, having had to cancel previous plans to marry in August 2020 due to the COVID-19 pandemic. They have a daughter, born in July 2022. A son was born in October 2024.
