= Charlie Ross (antiques expert) =

English auctioneer, antiques expert and television presenter

- Born: June 1950 (age 76); Buckinghamshire, England
- Occupation: Antiques expert
- Children: 2

Charlie Ross (born June 1950) is an English antiques expert, presenter and auctioneer, known for regular appearances on several BBC Antique programmes.

== Professional career ==
Ross started his career in 1963 after leaving school joining a local firm of estate agents and found himself auctioning chickens and turkeys. He progressed from these to antique furniture, and later established his own auction house in Woburn near Milton Keynes. He stood down in February 2008.

Ross appears on television as an antiques expert on the BBC programmes Bargain Hunt, Flog It!, Antiques Road Trip and Put Your Money Where Your Mouth Is. He is now one of the five regular presenters on Bargain Hunt.

For many years, Ross has conducted the Pebble Beach Vintage Car Auction in California, and the Scottsdale Auction in Arizona for Gooding and Company. He is often seen in this role in episodes of the TV show Chasing Classic Cars. He held the record for the highest price ever achieved for a car sold by auction in the US. The car, a 1957 Ferrari 250 Testa Rossa Prototype, sold for over $16 million in 2011. The price was exceeded in 2013, and again in 2014 for a Ferrari 250 GTO sold at Carmel, California for over $38 million. In 2018 he sold a 1935 Duesenberg for $22 million – the most expensive car ever to sell at auction in the US.

In recent years he has raised large sums of money at various charity auctions in Britain, including CLIC Sargent, The Elton John AIDS Foundation, The David Shepherd Wildlife Foundation, Caldwell Children and The Lord's Taverners.

Ross held the record for the largest profit on a single item on the Antiques Road Trip when in 2012 he bought a chipped Staffordshire elephant clock for £8 which was sold for £2,700 at auction. This was surpassed in 2016, when Anita Manning's Buddha statue that she had purchased for £50 sold for £3,800, a 7,500% profit, and again in 2017 when Paul Laidlaw bought a Chambre Automatique De Bertsch sub-miniature camera for £60 and sold it at auction for £20,000.

== Music career ==
In 2017 he with fellow BBC Antique Experts Charles Hanson, Philip Serrell and James Braxton recorded a rock version of "Sleigh Ride" in aid of BBC Children In Need. It was produced by father and son team Grahame and Jack Corbyn and released digitally on independent record label Saga Entertainment. The single peaked at number 1 on the Amazon Rock Charts.

In 2018 he re-joined Philip Serrell, James Braxton and a group of celebrities under the new name The Celebs to record a second Christmas single called Rock With Rudolph, to raise money for Great Ormond Street Hospital. The song was released on 30 November 2018, on independent record label Saga Entertainment. It was written and produced by Grahame and Jack Corbyn. The music video debuted exclusively with The Sun on 29 November 2018 and had its first TV showing on Good Morning Britain on 30 November 2018. The song peaked at number two on the iTunes pop chart.

In 2020 amid the COVID-19 crisis, Ross reunited with his fellow BBC antique experts James Braxton, Philip Serrell and the rest of The Celebs which now included Frank Bruno and X Factor winner Sam Bailey to raise money for both Alzheimer's Society and Action for Children. They recorded a new rendition of Merry Christmas Everyone by Shakin' Stevens and it was released digitally on 11 December 2020, on independent record label Saga Entertainment. The music video debuted exclusively on Good Morning Britain the day before release. The song peaked at number two on the iTunes pop chart.

== Personal life ==
Ross is married and has two children and four grandchildren. He moved to a village near Brackley in Northamptonshire.
