= Flog It! =

British television series

- Genre: Antiques programme
- Presented by: Paul Martin
- Country of origin: United Kingdom
- Original language: English
- No. of series: 17
- No. of episodes: 1,000+

Production
- Running time: 45 minutes
- Production company: BBC Studios

Original release
- Network: BBC Two
- Release: 27 May 2002 – 4 May 2020

Flog It! is a BBC television series presented by Paul Martin that was broadcast from 27 May 2002 to May 2020. (Note: The first five episodes were presented by Mark Harnden.)

== Description ==
The show follows a similar formula to Antiques Roadshow, with members of the public bringing their antiques to be viewed and valued by a team of experts. However, unlike Antiques Roadshow, the owners are then given the option to sell their items at an auction.

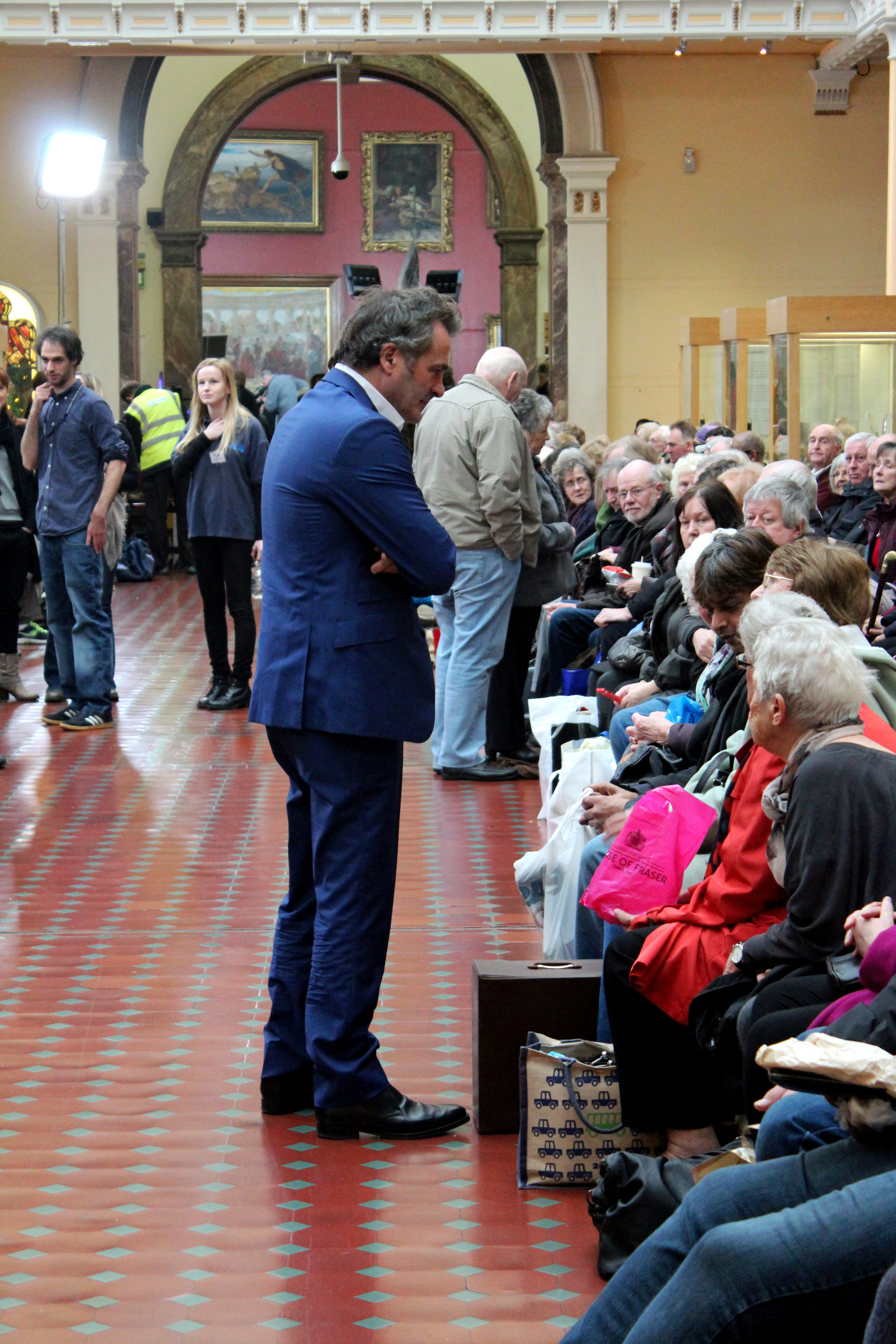
Recording BBC TV Flog It!, presenter Paul Martin chats to audience members (Birmingham, 2014)

The programme, originally broadcast as part of BBC One's afternoon schedule, subsequently appeared on BBC Two. It is shown as part of the early evening schedule for short runs, and sometimes also on Saturday afternoons. It was noted in early 2017 that Flog It! had recently filmed its 1000th episode.

On 2 October 2018, it was announced by the BBC that they would be axing the show after 17 years as part of a shake-up to "modernise" the daytime schedule.

== Objects ==
During each show, selected lots are auctioned off.

Items by Moorcroft (the factory of William Moorcroft), Clarice Cliff, Troika, René Lalique and Bergmann appear frequently. Previously unrecorded works by artists such as portrait painter Augustus Henry Fox have also been discovered.

In 2013, at Normanby Hall in Lincolnshire, a rare but unrecognised Australian Aboriginal shield was discovered that subsequently sold at auction for £30,000, being purchased by the Sydney Museum.

== Experts ==
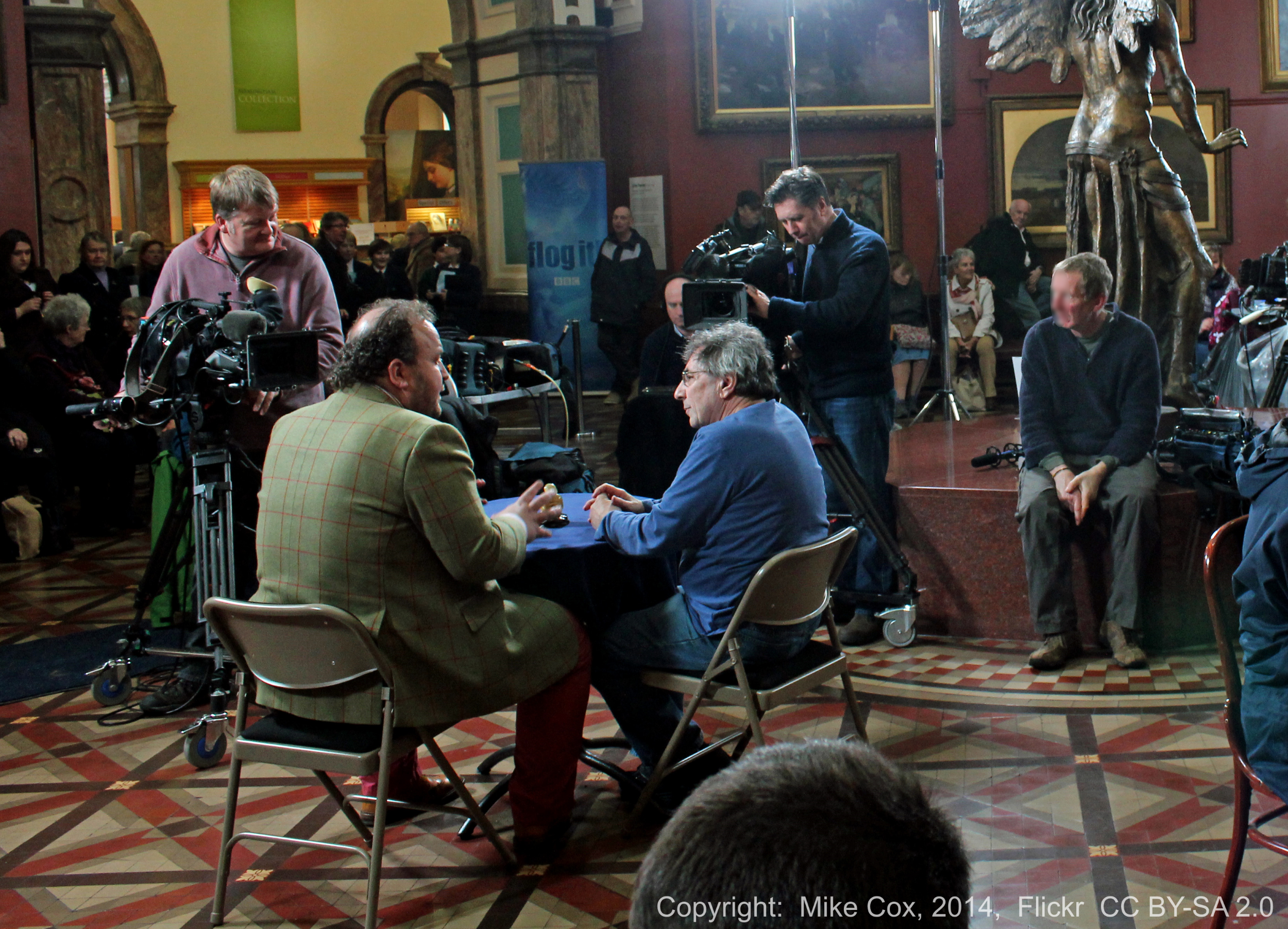
Recording BBC TV Flog It!, antiques expert and valuer James Lewis gives an opinion (Birmingham, 2014)

On each show, valuations are carried out by two experts and, sometimes, by Martin himself. Experts that have featured on the show include Will Axon, Michael Baggott, David Barby, Kate Bateman, Raj Bisram, Kate Bliss, James Braxton, James Lewis, Anita Manning, Jethro Marles, Adam Partridge, Thomas Plant, Claire Rawle, Natasha Raskin Sharp, Charlie Ross, Philip Serrell, Nigel Smith, Catherine Southon, Mark Stacey, Elizabeth Talbot Charles Hanson, Jonathan Pratt, Caroline Hawley, David Harper and Christina Trevanion, some of whom have also appeared as auctioneers in other editions of Flog It! and in other antiques-related BBC programmes such as Bargain Hunt and Cash in the Attic.

Kate Bliss herself presented several editions c. 2004–2005, when Paul Martin was unavailable.

== Locations ==
Like the Antiques Roadshow, the programme travels around the country. Most episodes include a segment where presenter Paul Martin investigates an aspect of local culture, history or historical figures. The auction usually takes place in an auction house in the same area.

The programme's 1000th episode was recorded at Bletchley Park, home to Britain's codebreakers during World War 2. It was one of more than 100 episodes directed by Fiona Scott.

== Transmissions ==
=== Regular series ===
Series	Start date	End date	Episodes
1	27 May 2002	??	60
2	20 May 2004	??	60
3	4 May 2004	??	??
4	9 May 2005	7 April 2006	70
5	28 August 2006	16 March 2007	80
6	30 May 2007	29 February 2008	60
7	16 September 2008	29 January 2009	60
8	24 August 2009	12 May 2010	74
9	10 May 2010	28 March 2011	75
10	23 May 2011	15 February 2012	75
11	3 September 2012	13 December 2013	60
12	7 April 2014	17 November 2014	60
13	18 September 2014	22 June 2015	40
14	26 August 2015	2 November 2016	60
15	7 November 2016	9 May 2018	60
16	11 May 2018	19 December 2019	60
17	20 November 2019	4 May 2020	40

=== Flog It: Trade Secrets ===
Series	Start date	End date	Episodes
1	11 February 2013	2 March 2013	15
2	19 August 2013	5 September 2013	15
3	10 March 2014	22 March 2014	15

=== Flog It! Travels Around Britain ===
Series	Start date	End date	Episodes
1	20 January 2009	13 November 2010	3
