= William Shields =

William Shields may refer to:

== Government ==
- William "Chip" Shields (born 1967), American politician
- William Shields, elected councillor in the 2002 Rugby Borough Council election
- William Bayard Shields (1780–1823), United States federal judge
- William Emmet Shields (1861–1893), lawyer and New York State legislator

== Others ==
- William Ernest Shields (1892–1921), Canadian First World War flying ace
- William G. Shields or Jehst (born 1979), English rapper
- William Joseph Shields or Barry Fitzgerald (1888–1961), Irish actor
- Billy Shields (born 1954), American football player

== See also ==
- Will Shields (born 1971), American football player
- William Shields Goodwin (1866–1937), American politician
- William Shield (1748–1829), English composer, violinist and violist
- William H. Shield (1878–1939), Canadian politician
- William Shiels (1848–1904), Australian colonial-era politician
