= Stephanie Connell =

British art and antiques specialist, auctioneer, and television personality

Stephanie Connell is a British art and antiques specialist, auctioneer, and television personality known for her regular appearances on the BBC programmes Bargain Hunt and Antiques Road Trip from Cockermouth. Before establishing her own retail business, she worked for over a decade at the international auction house Bonhams.

== Early career and education ==
She began her career in the fine art auction industry and joined the leading auction house Bonhams in 2006. Over her eight-year tenure, she served as the Director of Collector's Sales and Head of the Entertainment Memorabilia department. During her time at Bonhams, she worked on several high-profile auctions, including the sale of the original Maltese Falcon statue, which sold for over $3.4 million, the Eric Clapton sale of guitars and amplifiers, the estate of the late Richard Attenborough, the estate of the late Sir Christopher Lee and Jackie Kennedy's pearls.

== Television appearances ==
Connell is a regular expert on the long-running BBC daytime series Bargain Hunt. She also appears as an expert on the BBC Two programme Antiques Road Trip, where she drives with a co-expert to find antiques to sell at auction.

== Business and other work ==
In 2015, Connell founded her own company, Stephanie Connell Art & Antiques, based in Surrey. The business operates as both a retailer and a consultancy, specialising in 20th-century popular culture, design icons, and entertainment memorabilia. Her website highlights a collection focused on "historic figures, cinema, travel and leisure". In addition to retail, she offers a range of services, including valuations, acquisition, and sales advice.
