= Kate Bliss =

Antique valuer and TV personality

- Born: Kate Alcock; 1975 (age 50–51); Herefordshire, England
- Education: Brasenose College, Oxford
- Occupations: Antiques expert, television personality
- Spouse: Jonathan Bliss (m. 2005)
- Children: 2

Kate Bliss (née Alcock; born 1975) is an English antiques expert and television presenter.

Kate Bliss has appeared on the BBC's Bargain Hunt, Flog It! and Secret Dealers, and has presented Put Your Money Where Your Mouth Is. Bliss specialises in jewellery and silver, and is a fellow of the Great Britain Gemmological Association.

== Early life ==
Bliss was born Kate Alcock in 1975 in Herefordshire, she grew up in Hampton Bishop and later Dorstone. Educated at Hereford Cathedral School, she then read English Literature at Brasenose College, University of Oxford before studying fine art.

== Career ==
A member of the Royal Institution of Chartered Surveyors, having previously worked for her father's valuation and auction business, she joined Brightwells Auctioneers and Valuers. She then joined Philip Serrell's auction business. In light of her growing young family, Bliss currently runs her own Fine Art Valuation business, and works in association with a number of auction houses as a jewellery and silver expert, including Charles Hanson's business.

Bliss made her television debut after being spotted by the crew of Bargain Hunt, when they were on a visit to Brightwells auction house filming an episode. She then became an antiques expert on the programme, and later made appearances on Flog It! and Secret Dealers. Bliss has presented Put Your Money Where Your Mouth Is.

== Personal life ==
She has been married to Jonathan Bliss since 2005; the couple have two children.

Bliss plays the piano and performed in her early teenage years at Dorstone parish church Herefordshire, as reported in the local church magazine in July 1989.

Bliss is a supporter of St Michael's Hospice and the Alzheimer's Society, since her grandmother was diagnosed with Alzheimer's.
