= Toby Anstis =

British radio and television presenter (born 1970)

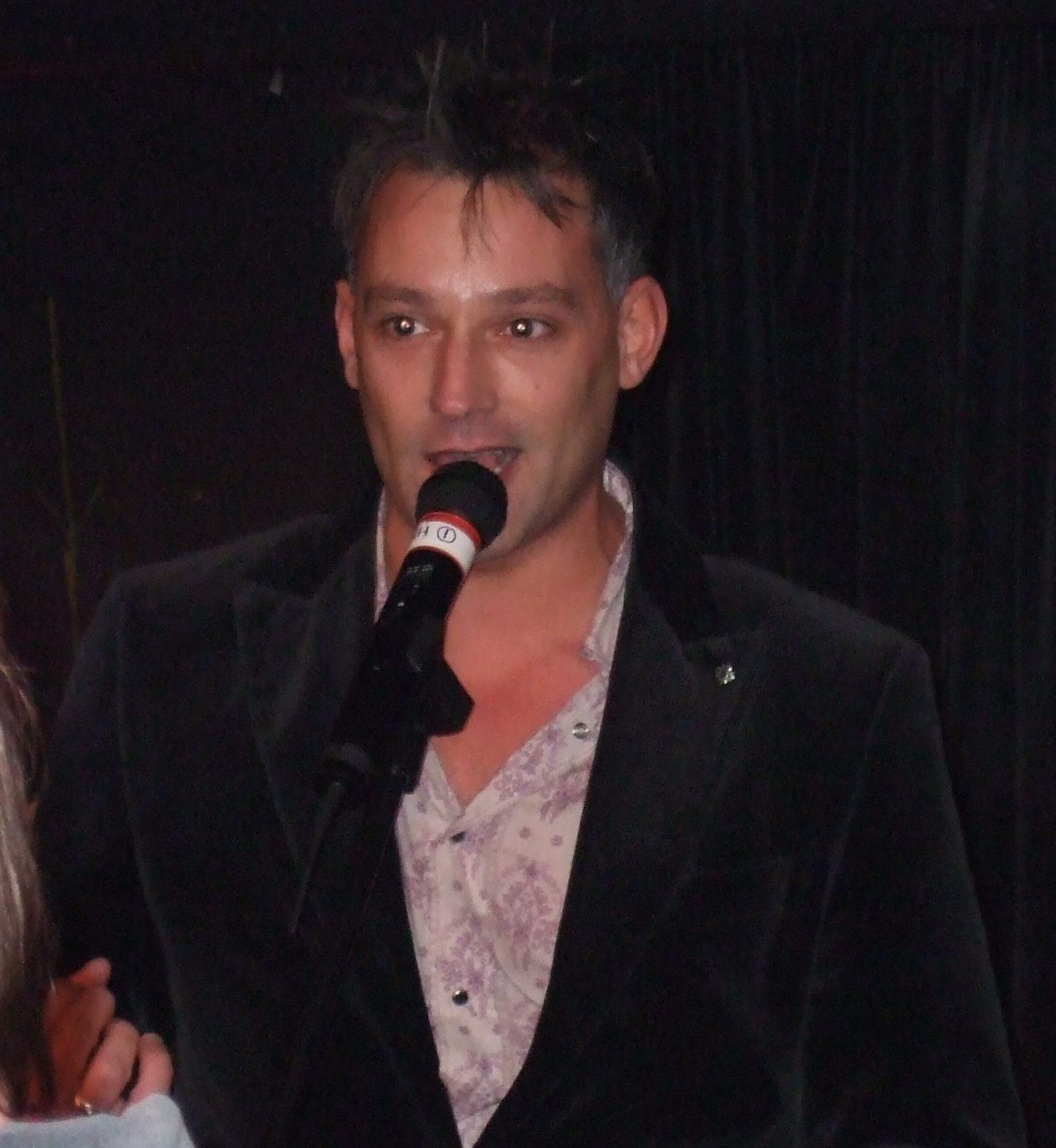
- Radio DJ and TV presenter Toby Anstis in January 2007
- Born: Toby Roger Anstis; Northampton, Northamptonshire, England
- Occupations: Radio and television presenter
- Employer: Global

Toby Roger Anstis is an English radio and television presenter. He is a presenter on Heart and spin-off station Heart Dance.

== Early life ==
Toby Roger Anstis was born in Northampton, England. He attended Desborough College in Maidenhead, Berkshire.

Anstis was adopted along with his twin sister as a child. His biological father was Italian and his biological mother was English. He met his birth parents only as an adult and has commented that he was "lucky" enough to have good adoptive parents.

== Career ==
Anstis began his career on BBC1's The Broom Cupboard. He was the show's last presenter and also spent three years on CBBC. He also worked on the music show The O-Zone on BBC1 and BBC2. Moreover, he co-hosted Children in Need for two years. He also presented cricket films for Grandstand, and hosted live outside broadcasts on The National Lottery Live for the BBC.

In 2006, Anstis was the first celebrity to be evicted in I'm a Celebrity...Get Me Out of Here!

In 2020, during the COVID-19 crisis, Anstis joined the super-group The Celebs with Frank Bruno and X Factor winner Sam Bailey to raise money for the Alzheimer's Society and Action for Children. They recorded a new rendition of "Merry Christmas Everyone" by Shakin' Stevens and it was released digitally on 11 December 2020 on independent record label Saga Entertainment.

In 2024, it was revealed that Anstis would be the headline act at the "Big 90s vs 00s" festival at Canvey Island, Essex, with his "Relight the 90s" show.

== Filmography ==
=== TV ===
- TV Scrabble (2001–2002) – Presenter
- I'm Famous and Frightened! (2004) – Guest
- Children in Need – Co-presenter
- Trust Me – I'm a Holiday Rep – Presenter
- The Mint – Guest
- I'm a Celebrity...Get Me Out of Here! (2006) – Participant
- Big Brother's Big Mouth (2006) – Pundit
- Ready Steady Cook (2009)
- The Alan Titchmarsh Show (2009)
- Mongrels (2010)
- Eggheads (2011)
- Loose Women – Loose Man
- Pointless Celebrities (2012, 2016, 2019) – Winning Contestant
- Celebrity Come Dine with Me: Christmas Special – Contestant
- Who's Doing the Dishes? (2015) – Celebrity chef
- A Place in the Sun (2017) – Himself
- Richard Osman's House of Games (2022) – Himself
