= David Dickinson =

English antiques expert, television presenter and entrepreneur (born 1941)

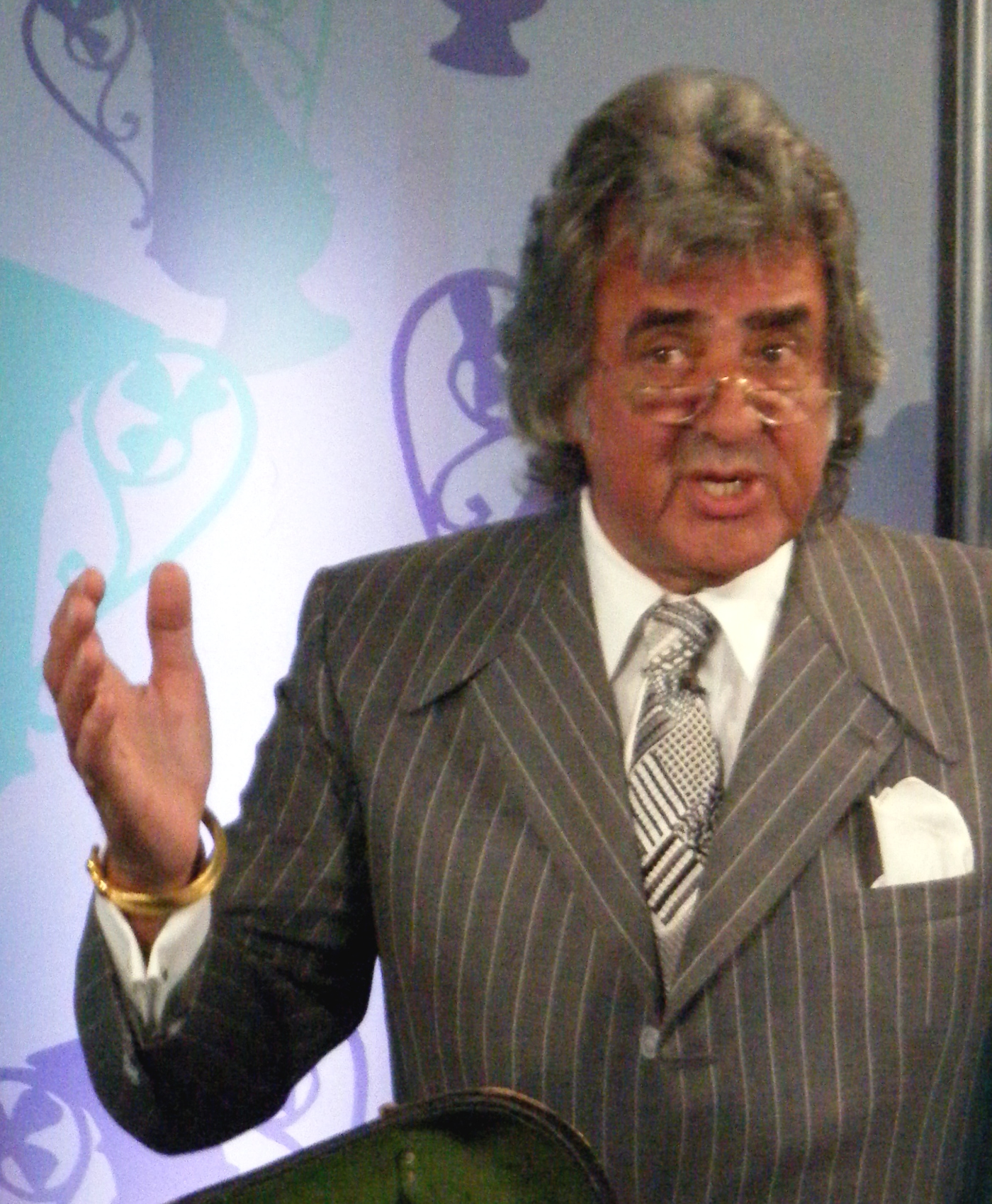
- Dickinson filming Dickinson's Real Deal in 2010
- Born: David Gulesserian; 16 August 1941 (age 85); Cheadle Heath, Cheshire, England
- Occupations: Broadcaster; antiques expert
- Years active: 1995–present
- Employer(s): ITV (2006–present); BBC (1998–2005)
- Known for: Dickinson's Real Deal
- Spouse: Lorne Lesley (m. 1968)
- Children: 2
- Website: david-dickinson.net

David Gulesserian (born 16 August 1941), known professionally as David Dickinson, is an English antiques dealer and television presenter best known for presenting Dickinson's Real Deal on ITV.

Dickinson began his television career as an antiques expert on the BBC's Antiques Show, and later on the ITV daytime programme This Morning. Between 2000 and 2004, Dickinson hosted the BBC One antiques show Bargain Hunt, where he was succeeded by Tim Wonnacott. Dickinson left the BBC in 2005 and Dickinson's Real Deal began airing the next year.

== Early life ==
David Gulesserian was born on 16 August 1941 in Cheadle Heath, Stockport, Cheshire, the son of Eugenie Gulesserian (born 1919 in Chorlton-cum-Hardy, Lancashire), a daughter of Hrant Gulesserian, an Armenian textile merchant who had moved from Istanbul (Constantinople), Turkey, to Manchester in 1904. Dickinson was placed for adoption as an infant and never again met his biological mother, although he corresponded with her in later life when she was living in Jersey. Dickinson's biological father is unknown. David was subsequently adopted by the Dickinsons, a local couple. Mr Dickinson died when David was 12, and as his mother worked hard to keep the family together, David was partly brought up by his adoptive paternal grandmother, Sarah.

Dickinson began an apprenticeship at an aircraft factory when he was 14, but quickly left to work in the cloth trade in Central Manchester. At 19, Dickinson served three years of a four-year prison sentence for mail-order fraud. The majority of his sentence was spent at HM Prison Manchester.

== Television career ==
Dickinson came to public attention as an antiques expert on This Morning, and BBC Two's The Antiques Show. His career break as a television celebrity came from presenting BBC One's daytime Bargain Hunt. He went on to present the BBC1 reality show, Dealing With Dickinson (2005), Dickinson moved to ITV in 2006, to present a new daytime antiques programme, Dickinson's Real Deal.

In 2010, he presented the celebrity variety show The David Dickinson Show. In 2017, he presented ITV's David Dickinson's Name Your Price.

== Catchphrases ==
- "Real bobby-dazzler" (particularly excellent item). Dickinson's biography is entitled What a Bobby Dazzler.
- "Cheap as chips" (bargain)
- "Always look for quality pieces" (wise advice)
- "A bit of a duffer" (lacks value)

== Guest appearances ==
In 2002, Dickinson joined Team B led by Ulrika Jonsson with Johnny Vegas, as a guest on Shooting Stars.

In 2004, Dickinson was one of several celebrities to have their portraits painted in the BBC One television series Star Portraits with Rolf Harris, and, also in 2004, he appeared in the first series of Strictly Come Dancing.

In 2005, Dickinson appeared on the ITV reality show I'm a Celebrity...Get Me Out of Here!, where he first announced that he had used heroin in his younger years. He also presented information slots for viewers on how to bid on satellite shopping channel Bid TV. He appeared in one episode of the ITV drama Heartbeat, playing an antiques dealer.

Dickinson explored his family background in an episode of the third series of the BBC genealogical documentary series Who Do You Think You Are? (2006).

In March 2014, Dickinson appeared in the eleventh series of Ant & Dec's Saturday Night Takeaway. The duo disguised themselves with prosthetics and fake accents to dupe Dickinson into believing there was a live argument and subsequent car crash on the set of his new 'fake' show Long Lost Treasures. During the aftermath of the wind up and following the big reveal from Ant & Dec, Dickinson said "you two have done me up like a kipper!"

He played the Emperor in the third episode of The Keith & Paddy Picture Show ("Return of the Jedi").

== Personal life ==
Dickinson met his wife, Lorne Lesley, a cabaret performer, in a nightclub in the 1960s, and they married in 1968. As a wedding gift Lorne gave David an antique regency mourning ring, set with a rose cut diamond. Lorne is of African, Welsh and Scottish ancestry; she hails from Tiger Bay, Cardiff. The couple live in the village of Prestbury in Cheshire. They have two grown-up children, and four grandchildren, Aim'ee and Lauren, Miles and Finley. Finley appeared alongside Dickinson on the second series of Big Star's Little Star. Miles, who is now an entrepreneur, featured on Series 20 of BBC's Dragons' Den, becoming the youngest contestant to successfully secure investment from a Dragon.
