= Roo Irvine =

Scottish antiques dealer and television presenter

Arusha "Roo" Irvine is a Scottish antiques dealer and television presenter. She has presented Antiques Road Trip, Flipping Profit and Bargain Hunt for the BBC.

== Biography ==
Irvine married Mark Irvine, an independent member of Argyll and Bute Council, in 2012. The couple worked in marketing until 2013, when her father died suddenly and his father died of cancer, and they quit their careers to look after their mothers. Due to her interest in antiques, they set up Kilcreggan Antiques.

Irvine was hired as an expert on the BBC's Antiques Road Trip, with her first episodes airing in 2017. The following year, she presented Flipping Profit, an antiques show benefitting Children in Need. In January 2019, her first episodes of Bargain Hunt as an expert were aired. In June 2022, she became one of a rota of presenters of the series.

Irvine took part on Celebrity Mastermind, Pointless Celebrities and Richard Osman's House of Games, all in 2022. In 2024, she competed on The Weakest Link, broadcast the following year.
