= David Harper (antiques expert) =

English antiques expert and television personality

- Born: David Kingsley Harper; 1967 (age 58–59); Yarm, North Yorkshire
- Occupation: Antique expert
- Years active: 1985–
- Spouse: Wendy Harper
- Children: 1

David Kingsley Harper (born 1967 in North Yorkshire, England) is an antiques expert, artist, speaker and writer. He appeared as an expert in a number of television shows on antiques, including Bargain Hunt, Antiques Road Trip and Put Your Money Where Your Mouth Is.

== Early life ==
Harper was born in Yarm near Middlesbrough, and he has two brothers and a sister. He grew up in Zimbabwe after the family moved there for work when he was around 10 months old. He also moved between Yorkshire, Coventry and Birmingham. He has an interest in collecting since childhood and had a large collection of coins and stamps by the age of seven, and bought his first antique when he was nine. He finished his schooling in the early 1980s.

== Career ==
Harper started his career in antiques when he was 18, and became a director of a company importing antique furniture from the Far East by the age of 23. His early career also involved shipping antiques to and from the United States; he opened an antiques shop in Florida in 1996, but soon returned to England to open a shop on The Bank in Barnard Castle.

Harper first became involved in broadcasting when BBC Radio Tees invited him to talk about antiques shops in Barnard Castle. Subsequently he appeared in a number of local radio broadcasts for the BBC. He was then involved in off-screen valuations for Cash in the Attic, but was also filmed discussing some objects. In 2005, Harper was chosen as presenter for Channel 4's Natural Born Dealers. The show, however, was short-lived, and he then appeared as an antiques expert on Bargain Hunt, followed by Antiques Road Trip and Put Your Money Where Your Mouth Is. In April 2010 he won the first series of Antiques Road Trip, raising £2488 for Children in Need from a starting budget of £200.

He has been featured on Through the Keyhole and Ready Steady Cook, and has presented pieces for The Heaven and Earth Show, The One Show, Inside Out and Countryfile Summer Diaries.

Harper has an interest in art, and he started painting in 2008.

== Publications ==
Harper wrote his first book, A Romp with the Georgians, a collection of stories from the Georgian period in 2020.

Harper is the author of the 2026 book The God Conundrum which charts his investigation into Christianity after he witnessed the transformation in a close family member who became a born-again Christian. He began as a skeptic agnostic, but says the evidence he found and experienced for Christianity was overwhelming and during the process of writing the book he became a Christian.

== Personal life ==
Harper married his wife Wendy in 1997, and they had a daughter in 1996. He has homes in Barnard Castle and London.
