= Michael Hogben =

Auctioneer and antique dealer

Michael "Hoggy" Hogben
- Born: 6 November 1952 (age 73); Folkestone, Kent, England
- Occupations: Auctioneer; Antiques Dealer
- Spouse: Lesley (2000–2006)

Michael "Hoggy" Hogben (born 6 November 1952) is an English auctioneer, antiques dealer, Author and TV personality who has appeared in the BBC series Bargain Hunt, ITV's Dickinson's Real Deal, and his own series Auction Man.

== Early life ==
Born in Foord Road in Folkestone, Kent, Hogben's mother died when he was five leaving him and his brother with their father. Hogben purposefully failed his Eleven-plus examination to attend the same school as his brother.

After both brothers graduated from school, Hogben's father emigrated to Australia leaving the two boys to fend for themselves. Hogben left school at 15 and two years later came into a small inheritance, which he invested in opening a fashion boutique called "Mickey Finn". Over the next ten years he expanded with outlets throughout Kent.

Hogben then sold the fashion chain, and invested in Kent's first wine bar – McCartney's – in Dover. Having studied art, in 1988 he opened his own auction house in Folkestone, which then traded until he sold it in 2004. Now Retired

== Television ==
Hogben became a Bargain Hunt expert when the show visited his auction rooms to sell contestant's items. Hogben held the record for the largest profit on a single item on "Bargain Hunt", when a team he led purchased a Royal Worcester box at Ardingly Fair for £140, then made £800 in a live auction shown on BBC One.

A BBC series Auction Man, focused on his auction rooms, demonstrating how the auction room works. The show ran for two series. Now retired.

== Personal life ==
Hogben and his long term partner Lesley married in 2000 after living together for a long time; the comedian Vic Reeves was best man. Michael has had three books published: A-Z of Antiques and Auctions, 101 Antiques of the Future, and Collecting Under the Radar.

== Works ==
- "Michael Hogben: A-Z of Antiques and Auction" -
- "101 Antiques of the future" (New Holland) 2007
- "Collecting Under the Radar: Tomorrow's Antiques" (Red Rock Press) American only-April 2009
