= Natasha Raskin Sharp =

Scottish television presenter and auctioneer

- Born: Natasha Raskin; 15 June 1986 (age 40); Glasgow, Scotland
- Citizenship: British
- Education: University of Glasgow
- Occupation: Television presenter
- Spouse: Joe Sharp (m. 2016)
- Children: 1
- Relatives: Philip Raskin (father); Max Raskin (grandfather)

Natasha Raskin Sharp (born 15 June 1986) is a Scottish television presenter, and antiques and art expert, especially in Scottish contemporary art, best known for her appearances on television. The daughter of contemporary Scottish artist Philip Raskin, she has appeared in programmes in the UK and the US including Antiques Road Trip, Celebrity Antiques Road Trip, Flog It!, Bargain Hunt, For What It's Worth and Baggage Battles.

== Family and education ==
She was born in 1986 in Glasgow, the middle of three children in a family of art lovers and collectors. Her father is the artist Philip Raskin, and her grandfather was former TV magician Max Raskin. Initially she studied law at the University of Leeds, but left her degree course after a month, taking the rest of the academic year off before going to the University of Glasgow to study a degree in History of Art.

In 2016, she married Joe Sharp, a producer of Celebrity Antiques Road Trip whom she met in 2013. They reside in Glasgow. She gave birth to her first child, a daughter Jean, in January 2024.

== Career ==
After deciding that law was not for her, she had a placement with the Alice Temperley fashion house, and worked in the primary elections of 2008 for Barack Obama in New Hampshire, during which he referred to her as part of "the Scottish contingent" of his team, and provided her with a signed reference for her work.

After returning to Scotland, she joined Glasgow auction house McTear's, as an auctioneer and latterly as Head of Pictures, dealing mainly with Scottish contemporary art. After her marriage, she now shares her auctioneering and valuation event duties at McTear's with her TV career. In 2021 she launched a new business auctioning artworks from the studios where they were made.

=== Television ===
Raskin is a regular expert contributor on the BBC's Antiques Road Trip, Celebrity Antiques Road Trip, Flog It! and has acted as both expert and lead presenter on BBC's Bargain Hunt. She appeared in the US show Baggage Battles. In 2016 she appeared as a guest expert in episodes of For What It's Worth with Fern Britton. She has also appeared on the Janice Forsyth Show on BBC Radio Scotland, reviewing an exhibition at the National Galleries of Scotland. She has been a guest presenter on BBC Radio Scotland's The Music Match, and between 2017 and 2025, presented her own weekly programme, playing an eclectic mix of music. She has presented story segments for The One Show on BBC 1. In October 2021 it was announced that she would be seen in Susan Calman’s Antiques Adventure on Channel 5.
