= Fiona Scott (media consultant) =

British Journalist (1966)

- Born: Fiona Joy Scott; March 1966 (age 60)
- Occupations: Media consultant, journalist, television director

Fiona Joy Scott (born March 1966) is an English media consultant and journalist.

Fiona Scott established her PR and Media Consultancy in 2008, called 'Mums in Media' (as a sole trader). By 2013, Scott set up her limited company, Fiona Scott Media Consultancy Limited. The company currently trades under the banner of Scott Media.

In 2021, she won Enterprise Nation's PR Adviser of the Year. In 2024, Fiona was named in Enterprise Nation’s Top 50 Business Advisers.

== Career ==
=== Journalism ===
Fiona Scott studied BA(Hons) Combined Studies in English Literature and History at Bath College of Higher Education (now Bath Spa University). She completed a PGCE in Secondary Education at the University of Bath (1987-1988).

By August 1988, she became a trainee journalist with Westminster Press. She was a trainee reporter for The North Somerset and Avon Weekly Series. She worked on The Keynsham Weekly Chronicle, Somerset Guardian, and Somerset Standard over three years. She qualified with a Westminster Press Diploma in Journalism.

By 1991, Fiona was a general reporter for The Evening Advertiser in Swindon, now the Swindon Advertiser. She was crime reporter and later business editor. She volunteered at Swindon Hospital Radio.

In 1995, she became a television researcher at HTV West in Bristol (now ITV West Country). Notable programmes included West Eye View, The West This Week, Beat the Dealer, and The Bargain Hunters.

Fiona Scott was made redundant from ITV in 2009, when ITV removed regional programming from its remit.

=== Entrepreneur ===
From 2008, Scott worked as a freelance television producer and director and started Mums in Media.

Notable programmes include Wales This Week, X-RAY, The One Show, and the antiques programme Flog It, for which she directed 136 episodes. This included the 1000th episode, which was recorded at Bletchley Park.

In 2021, Scott won Enterprise Nation’s PR Advisor of the Year and was nominated for the award again 2024. Paralympic gold medallist Christopher Hunt Skelley MBE is among her clients, and his wife, Louise Hunt Skelley PLY. She works with Julianne Ponan MBE, CEO of inclusive food brand, Creative Nature.

In 2023 she started a podcast, PR Not BS.

In 2025, Scott was shortlisted for Solo Entrepreneur of the Year for the South West Business and Community Awards.

== Personal History ==
Fiona Scott grew up in Radstock, Somerset in 1960s and 1970s. She attended Writhlingdon School and is the daughter and granddaughter of coal miners.

She lives in Swindon with her husband and children, she features in Beyond That Blue Door videos.

In 2023, Scott released The Hard Yards, a debut business memoir.
