= The Celebs =

English group

- Origin: London, England
- Genres: Pop, Christmas music
- Years active: 2018–present
- Labels: Saga Entertainment
- Members: See member list
- Past members: See member list

The Celebs are a celebrity supergroup created by Grahame and Jack Corbyn with the intention of raising money for charity. The group was formed in 2018 and consists of a changing mix of TV presenters, musicians, radio DJs, actors and sports personalities.

== History ==
In 2018, the initial lineup of 27 celebrities recorded an original Christmas song, "Rock with Rudolph", written and produced by Grahame and Jack Corbyn, in aid of Great Ormond Street Hospital. It was released digitally through independent record label Saga Entertainment on 30 November 2018. The music video debuted exclusively with The Sun on 29 November 2018 and had its first TV showing on Good Morning Britain on 30 November 2018.

Subsequent singles included covers of Shakin' Stevens' "Merry Christmas Everyone" in 2020, supporting Action for Children and the Alzheimer's Society; the Beatles' "Let It Be" in 2021, supporting Mind; and Michael Jackson's "Thriller" in 2022, again supporting Great Ormond Street Hospital.

In August 2023, the Celebs recorded an original Christmas song called "So Delicious", which was followed in 2024 by a cover of the Beatles' "All You Need Is Love", both supporting Great Ormond Street Hospital.

== Members ==
=== 2018 ===
- Laura Aikman
- Faye Barker
- Christina Bennington
- Antonia Bernath
- Olivia Birchenough
- Lionel Blair
- James Braxton
- Nathan Connor
- Dani Harmer
- Bob Harris
- Anne Hegerty
- Kathy Hill
- Jess Impiazzi
- Rebecca Keatley
- Shona McGarty
- Eunice Olumide
- Gail Porter
- Charlie Ross
- Lettice Rowbotham
- Emma Samms
- Philip Serrell
- Kellie Shirley
- Amy Thompson
- Nicola Thorp
- Laura Tobin
- Kara Tointon
- Naomi Wilkinson

=== 2020 ===
- Toby Anstis
- Richard Arnold
- Sam Bailey
- Faye Barker
- Christina Bennington
- James Braxton
- Kiera-Nicole Brennan
- Frank Bruno
- Madeline Duggan
- Becky Evans
- Emma Fry
- Lucy Horobin
- Jess Impiazzi
- Rebecca Keatley
- Kady McDermott
- Anna Nightingale
- Kylie Olson
- Eunice Olumide
- Evie Pickerill
- Jess Robinson
- Charlie Ross
- The Sacconejolys
- Jonathan Samuels
- Philip Serrell
- Kellie Shirley
- Laura Tobin
- Hannah Vaughan Jones
- Lewis Vaughan Jones
- Naomi Wilkinson

=== 2021 ===
- Shona McGarty (lead)
- Madeline Duggan
- Anne Hegerty
- Georgia Hirst
- Sam Hughes
- Ivan Kaye
- Rebecca Keatley
- Eunice Olumide
- Verona Rose
- Charlie Ross

=== 2022 ===
- Jo O'Meara (lead)
- Faye Barker
- Tyger Drew-Honey
- Bethannie Hare
- Anne Hegerty
- Kathy Hill
- Ivan Kaye
- Verona Rose

=== 2023 ===
- Faye Barker
- Kate Harding
- Anne Hegerty
- Kathy Hill
- Isabel Hodgins
- Tamara Kalinic
- Millie Mclay
- Gina Meredith
- Melinda Messenger
- Emily Faye Miller
- Abi Moores
- James Braxton
- Eunice Olumide
- Laura Tobin
- Shelby Tribble

=== 2024 ===
- Christopher Biggins
- James Braxton
- Charlie Brooks
- Frank Bruno
- Jade Ewen
- Izzy Fairthorne
- Kimberly Hart-Simpson
- Caroline Hawley
- Anne Hegerty
- Lucy Horobin
- Jess Impiazzi
- Matt Johnson
- Ivan Kaye
- Alison King
- Abi Moores
- Andrew Pierce
- Suzanne Shaw
- Sukie Smith
- Shaun Wallace

== Discography ==
=== Singles ===
Year	Title
2018	"Rock with Rudolph"
2020	"Merry Christmas Everyone"
2021	"Let It Be"
2022	"Thriller"
2023	"So Delicious"
2024	"All You Need Is Love"

== Music videos ==
Year	Title
2018	"Rock with Rudolph"
2020	"Merry Christmas Everyone"
2021	"Let It Be"
2022	"Thriller"
2023	"So Delicious"
2024	"All You Need Is Love"
