= Tim Wonnacott =

British antiques television presenter

- Born: Timothy Wonnacott; 12 March 1951 (age 75); Barnstaple, Devon, England
- Occupations: Broadcaster, antiques expert
- Years active: 1978–present
- Television: Antiques Roadshow; Bargain Hunt; Antiques Road Trip
- Spouse: Helen Mary Wonnacott (m. 1984)
- Children: 3
- Awards: Key to the city of Plymouth
- Website: www.timwonnacott.com

Timothy Wonnacott (born 12 March 1951) is an English chartered auctioneer, chartered surveyor, antiques expert, narrator, and a television presenter. He was previously a director of Sotheby's, one of the world's oldest auction houses.

He is best known for having presented the BBC daytime programme Bargain Hunt from 2003 until 2015, and has been the narrator of Antiques Road Trip since it began in 2010.

== Education ==
Wonnacott was educated at the independent West Buckland School in Devon; after qualifying as a chartered auctioneer and chartered surveyor, he took a postgraduate course at the Victoria and Albert Museum in fine and decorative arts.

== Professional career ==
Wonnacott's ambition was to follow in the footsteps of his father, Major Raymond Wonnacott, an auctioneer in South West England.

Wonnacott joined Sotheby's in 1978, becoming a full Director in 1985. He was appointed sole chairman of Sotheby's South, based at Billingshurst in Sussex and at Sotheby's saleroom in Olympia, London. He ran Sotheby's operations in North West England when he lived in Cheshire.

In January 2003, he left Sotheby's after 25 years, in order to concentrate on his media activities. He started the fine art agency and brokerage business Tim Wonnacott & Associates.

Wonnacott has helped raise money for many charities at auction, including the 'Cow Parade' auctions in London and the Isle of Man (the former featuring the prize cow ‘big Kez’),^{[9]} the sale of statues of Gromit in Bristol in 2013, and the sale of statues of Shaun the Sheep in Bristol in 2015. In October 2007, he took part in what was then believed to be the world's largest public art auction, when 63 fibreglass cows were put up for sale outside Manchester Town Hall. Proceeds were to be donated to a local charity, Manchester Kids.

He is a fellow of the Royal Institution of Chartered Surveyors.

== Television ==
In July 2003, Wonnacott replaced David Dickinson as the daytime host of BBC One television programme Bargain Hunt. The original contract was for 30 shows, but this was extended to over 350 shows.

Wonnacott is the narrator of BBC TV's Antiques Road Trip and Celebrity Antiques Road Trip. His other TV appearances include BBC One's Restoration, The Divine Michelangelo, Test the Nation, Ready, Steady, Cook, This Morning, Top Gear, Going, Going, Gone, Going for a Song, Light Lunch, The Antiques Show, Put Your Money Where Your Mouth Is, The Great Antiques Hunt, Buried Treasures, and Royal Upstairs Downstairs.

On 29 August 2014, Wonnacott was announced as a contestant on the twelfth series of Strictly Come Dancing. He was partnered with Australian dancer Natalie Lowe. The couple were eliminated in week 4, after dancing the paso doble, in favour of Mark Wright and Karen Hauer staying in the competition.

On 16 September 2015, it was reported that he was no longer to host Bargain Hunt for personal reasons, after an alleged disagreement with producers.

== Personal life ==
Wonnacott was born in Barnstaple, north Devon, England, the younger son of local auctioneer Major Raymond Wonnacott and his wife Pamela. He was brought up in Devon. His elder brother Paul died in the late 1960s.

He married Helen in 1984; they have three children.
