= Augustus Henry Fox =

English painter

- Born: 9 January 1822; London, England
- Died: 1895 (aged 73); Stockport, Cheshire
- Occupations: Artist; Portrait painter
- Known for: Exhibiting at the Royal Academy

Augustus Henry Fox (9 January 1822 – 1895) was an English portrait painter who exhibited three works at the Royal Academy.

== Biography ==
Fox was born in London, the son of Augustus Fox, an artist and engraver, and Ann Alice Burnard. He married Mary Ann Turney in 1845.

In 1843, Fox was a Silver Medal "for the next best drawing from the antique" at a Royal Academy assembly in London.

Although Fox exhibited at the Royal Academy, little was recorded about him until 2010, when an oil painting signed A. H. Fox, depicting an unidentified bearded man in civilian dress, which had been found discarded in a waste skip, was put up for sale on the BBC television programme Flog It!. Although the canvas was described as being in good condition (the frame was damaged), it was auctioned for only £40. Other works by Fox have been sold at some of the most prestigious auction houses, including Bonhams.

Among his sitters were Francis Aspinal Philips, who was High Sheriff of Radnorshire in 1851, Philips' wife Jane, Sir Edward Watkin, 1st Baronet, MP and various members of the Rymer family, notably Thomas Rymer of Calder Abbey and the Dutton Estate Ribchester (Rymer purchased Calder Abbey for £44,200 in 1885, eleven years after the portrait) and Thomas Harrison Rymer, Esq. (1874), a commissioning agent and later a Justice of the Peace, who inherited the estate on Thomas Rymer's death (1902) (Farrer W. & Brownbill J. 1912. A History of the County of Lancaster. Volume 7 pp. 45–51). T H Rymer would hold the seat at Calder Abbey, Cumberland as well as another at Letton Lodge, Broughton Park, Manchester and would become High Sheriff of Cumberland in 1910 until his death on 13 April 1911. Fox's work shows T H Rymer as a young, distinguished man seated upright at a desk with documents. It is unusual in the context of much of Fox's portraiture work in that it shows the sitter in profile, focusing on the youthful distinction of the subject's face and surrounded by an aura.

== Works ==
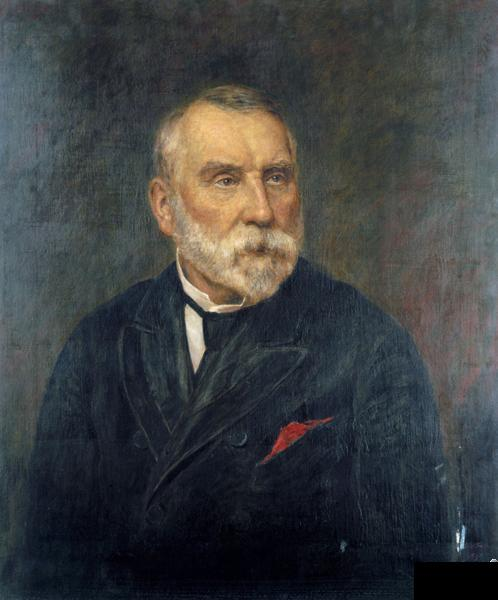
Portrait of Sir Edward W. Watkin, Chairman of the Manchester, Sheffield & Lincolnshire Railway (1891).

- Portrait of J. P. Burnard, Esq. Exhibited at the Royal Academy, 1838
- Untitled. Exhibited at the Royal Academy, 1838
- Portrait of Sir Edward W. Watkin, Chairman of the Manchester, Sheffield & Lincolnshire Railway, 1891, in National Railway Museum
- Francis Aspinal Philips (1793–1859), High Sheriff of Radnorshire (1851), in Radnorshire Museum, Llandrindod Wells, Powys.
- Jane Philips (née Jackson, married Francis Aspinal Philips in 1824), in Radnorshire Museum
- Boy and Girl in Landscape (1856), in the collection of Colchester and Ipswich Museums Service
- Pair of oval portraits depicting Joseph Marsland and female companion
- James Ashton of Rochdale [brother of Leah Rymer née Ashton]
- William Rymer (1858?) [father of William Thomas and Ellen Rymer, husband of Leah Rymer née Ashton] (d. 1865)
- Ellen Rymer (1858?] [daughter of William Rymer?]
- Thomas Harrison Rymer, Esq. (1874) [1852-1911, "only son of William Rymer"]
- Thomas Rymer (1874) (d.1902)
- Mrs Anne Lee (1871) [Amy Rymer's, née Falkner, grandmother; therefore grandmother in law to Thomas Harrison Rymer]
- Mrs Mary Harrison (1862) [wife of William Rymer, daughter of Jane Jackson and Thomas Harrison] (d. 1891)
