= The Repair Shop =

British television show

- Genre: Factual
- Directed by: Ben Borland
- Creative director: Katy Thorogood
- Starring: Jay Blades (2017–2024); Will Kirk; Steve Fletcher; Dominic Chinea; Suzie Fletcher; Sonnaz Nooranvary; Al MacKay; Amanda Middleditch; Kirsten Ramsay; Lucia Scalisi; Tim Weeks; Julie Tatchell; Brenton West
- Narrated by: Bill Paterson (Series 1, 5–present & The Repair Shop on the Road); Robert Pugh (Series 2–4); Ashley Jensen (The Repair Shop: Beyond the Barn)
- Theme music composer: Ian Livingstone
- Country of origin: United Kingdom
- Original language: English
- No. of series: 16
- No. of episodes: 339

Production
- Executive producers: Carla-Maria Lawson; Emma Walsh; Hannah Lamb
- Producers: Helen Page; Tanveer Bari; Siân Bantock; Alex Raw
- Production location: Weald and Downland Living Museum
- Cinematography: Neil Kent
- Editors: Hal Watmough; Shelley Hamilton-Smith; Tracey Ashcroft; Clare Childs; Ant Hayes; Caroline Law
- Camera setup: Multi-camera
- Running time: 30 minutes (series 1); 45 minutes (series 2–5, 7, 9, 11, 15 and On The Road); 60 minutes (series 6, 8, 10, 12–14, 16, Favourite Fixes and Beyond the Barn)
- Production company: Ricochet

Original release
- Network: BBC Two (series 1–3); BBC One (series 4–present)
- Release: 27 March 2017 – present

Related
- Saved and Remade; The Toy Hospital

The Repair Shop is a British daytime and primetime television show made by production company Ricochet that aired on BBC Two for series 1 to 3 and on BBC One for series 4 onwards, in which family heirlooms are restored for their owners by numerous experts with a broad range of specialisms. Furniture restorer Jay Blades acted as the foreman until 2024. Since 2024, regular experts Will Kirk and Dominic Chinea act as co-foremen.

== Theme ==
Each episode follows professional craftspeople from around the country who restore family heirlooms that have sentimental value for their owners. The experts are found mostly through social media, and the heirlooms' owners are not charged for the restorations. Some items require the attention of two experts. For example, a clock in a wooden case. Steve Fletcher repairs the clock whilst Will Kirk restores the wooden case.

== Episodes ==
Series	Episodes	Originally released	
Series	Episodes	First released	Last released
1	15	27 March 2017	16 December 2017
2	15	12 March 2018	30 March 2018
3	15	13 August 2018	19 September 2018
4	30	1 April 2019	10 May 2019
5	40	18 November 2019	2 October 2020
6	14	7 October 2020	10 March 2021
7	40	15 March 2021	26 November 2021
8	14	21 April 2021	26 January 2022
9	40	29 December 2021 (Note: An episode billed as "Series 9, Episode 1" aired as a one-off on 29 December 2021. However, Series 9 did not officially start until 14 March 2022 with a different Episode 1, and the previously aired episode is scheduled to repeat in this run as Episodes 6 or 20.)	18 November 2022
10	14	11 May 2022 (Note: Series 10 officially started 11 May 2022 half way through Series 9 and had ended 5 October 2022 before 20 more episodes were commissioned for Series 9.)	5 October 2022
11	40	2 January 2023	20 October 2023 (Note: Series 12 officially started 22 March 2023 half way through Series 11 despite 20 more episodes were commissioned. However "Series 11, Episodes 21 to 30" aired from 21 August to 1 September 2023 before commissioning 10 more episodes running between 9 and 20 October 2023, then "Series 12, Episodes 9 to 11" aired on 13, 20 and 27 September 2023 before commissioning 3 more episodes. Series 12 does not officially end until 10 January 2024.)
12	14	22 March 2023	10 January 2024
13	17 (3 unaired)	10 April 2024 (Note: Series 13 originally was going to commission 40 episodes but the number of episodes for Series 13 had been decreased to 20 episodes instead due to overlapping transmissions between series 7 and series 12 and due to the trial of Jay Blades.)	5 March 2025
14	28 (Note: Including compilation episodes)	8 January 2025 (Note: Series 14 originally was going to commission 14 episodes but the number of episodes for Series 14 had been increased to 25 episodes and 3 compilation episodes instead due to overlapping transmissions between series 7 and series 12 and due to Series 13 airing 17 out of 20 episodes.)	8 October 2025
15	6 (Note: Including Christmas special episode)	15 October 2025 (Note: Series 15 originally was also going to commission 40 episodes but the number of episodes for Series 15 had been decreased to 6 episodes instead due to overlapping transmissions between series 7 and series 12 and due to the trial of Jay Blades. Series 15 also ended with a Christmas Special episode.)	26 December 2025
16	25	25 February 2026	TBC in 2026 or 2027

=== Christmas specials ===
Several Christmas-themed special episodes (with the exception of The Repair Shop at Christmas 2018) have been produced and since the 2020s, they have been transmitted on Christmas Eve on some years and on Boxing Day on other years. The earliest transmission date on record was five days before Christmas Eve 2017 and the latest transmission date on record was three days after Boxing Day 2019.

Year	Transmission date
2017	19 December 2017
2018	Cancelled due to unfinished filming
2019	29 December 2019
2020	26 December 2020
2021	24 December 2021
2022	26 December 2022
2023	24 December 2023
2024	24 December 2024
2025	26 December 2025
2026	26 December 2026

=== Charity specials ===
The show has been included in Children in Need events, for example restoring a teddy in 2021, and a carved wooden chair in 2022. In 2022, the show's presenters were featured with Dawn French and Jennifer Saunders, who appeared in character, and Judi Dench in a parody of the sketch comedy series French and Saunders for Comic Relief.

=== The Repair Shop Favourite Fixes ===
Following Jay Blades' being charged with controlling and coercive behaviour, in September 2024, he stepped back from his television work, and The Repair Shop introduced a spin-off series, showcasing the best and favourite repairs from previous episodes of regular series, introduced by Bill Paterson.

Series	Episodes	Originally released	
Series	Episodes	First released	Last released
1	7	30 October 2024	30 December 2024

=== The Repair Shop on the Road ===
In 2025 following the success of The Repair Shop Favourite Fixes, another spin-off series of The Repair Shop was introduced and presented by Kirk and Chinea called The Repair Shop on the Road.

Series	Episodes	Originally released	
Series	Episodes	First released	Last released
1	20	3 February 2025	25 June 2025
2	15	5 January 2026	27 March 2026
3	15	TBD in 2027	TBD in 2027

=== Teen Titans Go to the Repair Shop ===
A two-part crossover with the animated Cartoon Network series Teen Titans Go!, titled Teen Titans Go to the Repair Shop and featuring several of the experts from The Repair Shop guest-starring as themselves, along with Bill Paterson narrating, aired on Cartoon Network across two weeks in August 2026 - Part 1 on 15 August 2026 and Part 2 on 22 August 2026. Both episodes are considered part of season 9 of Teen Titans Go!

=== The Repair Shop: Beyond The Barn ===
Following the success of The Repair Shop on the Road and the crossover Cartoon Episodes Teen Titans Go to the Repair Shop another new spin-off series which replaces The Repair Shop Favourite Fixes from the last 2 years and is similar to The Repair Shop on the Road debuts on 2 September 2026 called The Repair Shop: Beyond The Barn. Ashley Jensen is the narrator in this series.

Series	Episodes	Originally released	
Series	Episodes	First released	Last released
1	8	2 September 2026	21 October 2026

== Notable artists ==
Episode 5 of series 1 featured a painted ceramic jug made by Picasso contemporary Jean Lurçat.

Episode 12 of series 1 featured a painting by British landscape artist Frederick Appleyard. Brought in by Appleyard's relative (his great-grand-nephew), the heavily damaged painting was restored by Lucia Scalisi.

In episode 16 of the same series, Scalisi restored an oil portrait by Cyril James Frost, at the request of its owner, the sitter's son.

In series 4, episode 22, a miniature by Sarah Biffin was restored, by Scalisi and paper conservator Louise Drover.

== Notable guest ==
In October 2022, King Charles III (still the Prince of Wales at the time of filming, but King at the time of airing) appeared in an episode in which a piece of pottery made for Queen Victoria's Diamond Jubilee, and an 18th-century clock, were restored by the show's experts. Jay Blades, Steve Fletcher, his son Fred, Kirsten Ramsay and Will Kirk were featured.

== Filming ==
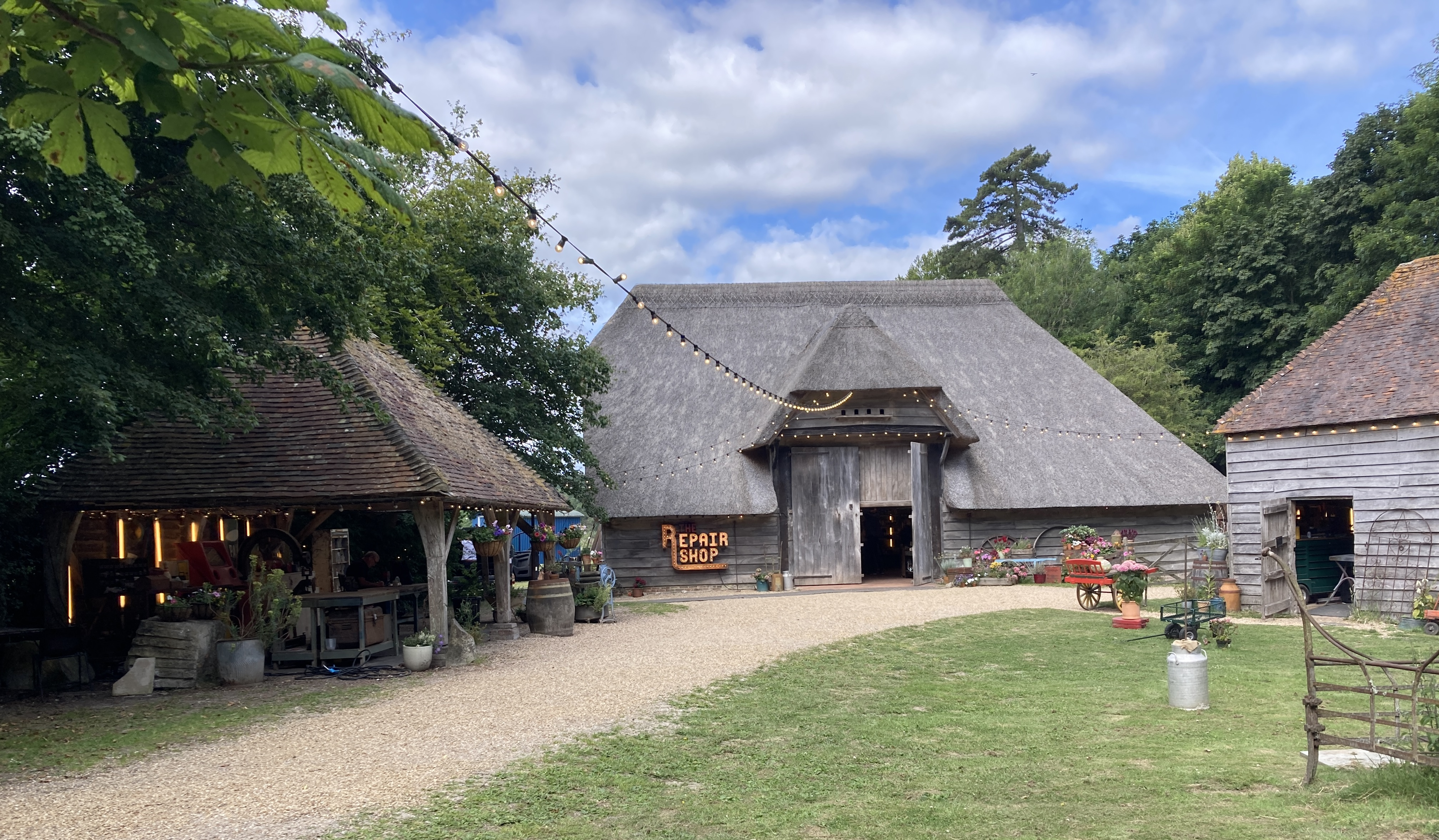
Weald and Downland Living Museum in 2024

The Repair Shop is filmed at the Weald and Downland Living Museum in Singleton, West Sussex. The Court Barn is the principal setting, though some repairs are carried out in the Victorian smithy and nearby wagon shed.

== Experts ==
=== Regular ===
- Jay Blades, furniture restorer and foreman (2017–2024)
- Dominic Chinea, metal worker, signs restorer and foreman
- Steven Fletcher, clock restorer mechanical and toy restoration
- Suzie Fletcher, leather worker, saddle maker
- Will Kirk, carpenter, cabinet-maker, furniture restorer, model painter and foreman
- Sonnaz Nooranvary, upholstery restorer
- Amanda Middleditch and Julie Tatchell, soft toy and doll restorers, known as the "Bear Ladies"
- Kirsten Ramsay, Sussex-based ceramics conservator
- Lucia Scalisi, painting conservator
- Brenton West, silversmith and antique photography specialist

=== Guest and semi-regular experts ===
(in alphabetical order)

- Angelina Bakalarou, paper and paintings conservator
- Stuart Black, firefighting historian
- George Blackman, antique typewriter restorer
- Matthew Boultwood, blacksmith
- David Burville, organ restorer, toy repairer
- Sara Dennis, embroidery specialist
- John Dilworth, violin restorer
- Louise Drover, paper conservator
- Neil Fairley, vintage electronics repairer
- Catherine Guilder, butter churn restorer
- Tim Gunn, bicycle restorer
- Geoff Harvey, pinball and arcade machine restorer
- Sarah Hatton, willow artist
- Stephen Kember, music box specialist
- David Kennett, luthier, guitar restorer
- Kouresh Kouchakpour, luthier
- Alasdair MacKay, Printmaker and gilder
- Blue MacMurchie and John MacMurchie, bagpipes restorers, known as the "MacMurchie Bagpipe Brothers"
- Graham Mancha, furniture restorer
- Matthew Nickels, stained-glass worker
- Guillaume Pons, ceramics restorer
- Pierro Pozella, camera restorer
- Laurence Richardson, jukebox restorer
- Richard Rigby, antique projector specialist
- Nigel Robinson, electronics engineer
- Greg Rowland, wheelwright
- Joujou Saad and Walid Saad, antique typewriter restorers, known as "Mr & Mrs Vintage Typewriters"
- Christopher Shaw, book-binder
- Alastair Simms, master cooper
- Kaviraj Singh, sitar restorer
- Rachael South, London-based furniture caner
- Mark Stuckey, electronics, radio and electrical restorer
- Richard Talman, master goldsmith
- Roger Thomas, accordion specialist
- Jayesh Vaghela, hatter
- Tim Weeks, gramophone specialist
- Julyan Wallis, luthier
- Dean Westmoreland, cobbler, shoe repairer
- Hannah Weston Smith, traditional upholsterer
- Pete Woods, percussion and musical instrument repairer

== Merchandise ==
=== Home media ===
DVD releases of the series are released by Dazzler Media under license from Warner Bros.

On 25 June 2018, a DVD release of The Complete Series 1 and 2017 Christmas Special was released on a two-disc DVD set. A DVD release of Series Two was released on 7 October 2019. A DVD of Series 3 was released in March 2020, Series 4 was released as a two-disc set in March 2021, and Series 5 was released as a two-disc set in November 2021.

=== Books ===
On 25 July 2019, a do-it-yourself hardback book was released, entitled The Repair Shop: A Make Do and Mend Handbook, published by BBC Books.

The Repair Shop: Tales from the Workshop of Dreams was published by BBC Books on 5 November 2020.

Bright Spark: Inside the Curious Mind of The Repair Shop's Electronics Expert was published by Mirror Books on 24 September 2026.

== Reception ==
In 2019, The Repair Shop received a nomination for a Rose d'Or in the Reality and Factual Entertainment category. After moving to prime time for Series 6 in March 2020, it was watched by 6.7 million people.

In 2023, the show won a National Television Award in the daytime programme category.

For the programme's 2025 Christmas episode, The Jewish Chronicle and the Jewish Telegraph Agency criticised the omission of Jews when the episode explained the damage to Martin Landau’s cello during the Kindertransport. The Jewish Chronicle also alleged that the episode cut away the word "Jewish" from the beginning of a sentence spoken by Helen Mirren, which aired as: "…children were put on the Kindertransport". Ricochet claimed that they thought Landau's Jewish identity was "implicit" but promised to rectify the error. The BBC also apologised for the omission and the correction was eventually made.

== International versions ==
An Australian version of the show, The Repair Shop Australia, debuted on Lifestyle on 3 May 2022. It is hosted by Dean Ipaviz, a builder and carpenter, and features six repairers.

A Dutch version of the show, The Repair Shop, debuted on RTL 4 on 2 September 2019. It was hosted by Humberto Tan, a radio and TV presenter, sports journalist and writer, and lasted one season.

A Dutch version of the show in Belgium, De Repair Shop, debuted on Eén on 4 September 2022. It is hosted by Danira Boukhriss Terkessidis, a newscaster and TV Presenter, and had its second season in 2023.
