= Faye Barker =

English journalist and presenter

- Occupations: Journalist and presenter
- Years active: 1996–present

Faye Barker is an English journalist and presenter employed by ITN.

== Career ==
She began her career at the London-based European Business News, an affiliate of CNBC, in October 1996.

After becoming a production journalist for ITN in 1999, she later made her on-screen TV debut for 5 News on Channel 5, where she was a presenter and reporter.

In 2001, she landed a presenting job for the regional evening news magazine Calendar on ITV Yorkshire.

Whilst working at ITV Yorkshire, she appeared as an undercover reporter on three series of Package Holiday Undercover on ITV. In 2004 she narrated the documentary series St Jimmys.

In 2005, Barker became a freelancer - appearing on the ITV Morning News, ITV News Channel, ITV News London, Setanta Sports News, Sky News and 5 News.

On 23 December 2005, she and Owen Thomas presented the final broadcast for the dedicated ITV News Channel which closed after five years of broadcasting.

In Autumn 2007 she made a cameo appearance playing a journalist in episode two of the ITV drama Whistleblowers. Since then she has appeared in the films Survivor (2015), Weekender (2011) and Hampstead (2016) and also played a newscaster in the Hulu series Four Weddings and a Funeral (2019)

On 12 January 2009 she was appointed the main newscaster of the ITV Morning News on ITV. The programme was discontinued in December 2012.

Barker would also present three short opts which air as part of Good Morning Britain) for ITV News London on ITV London (Wednesdays & Thursdays) - a role of which she continues.

She is also a reporter for the ITV Lunchtime News.

Her corporate work has included presenting awards shows and videos for Randtad, English National Ballet School and Middlesex University as well as hosting debates, including for Totaljobs.

In 2018, Barker joined 26 other celebrities under the artist name The Celebs and performed an original Christmas song called Rock With Rudolph, written and produced by Grahame and Jack Corbyn. The song was recorded in aid of Great Ormond Street Hospital and was released digitally through independent record label Saga Entertainment on 30 November 2018. The music video debuted exclusively with The Sun on 29 November 2018 and had its first TV showing on Good Morning Britain on 30 November 2018. The song peaked at number two on the iTunes pop chart.

In 2020 amid the COVID-19 crisis Barker rejoined The Celebs, which this year included Frank Bruno and X Factor winner Sam Bailey to raise money for both Alzheimer's Society and Action for Children. They recorded a new rendition of Merry Christmas Everyone by Shakin' Stevens and it was released digitally on 11 December 2020, on independent record label Saga Entertainment. The music video debuted exclusively on Good Morning Britain the day before release. The song peaked at number two on the iTunes pop chart.

In September 2022, Barker rejoined The Celebs alongside Anne Hegerty and Jo O'Meara to mark the 40th anniversary of the Michael Jackson classic album Thriller and raise money for Great Ormond Street Hospital, with a new rendition of the title track, which was released on the independent record label Saga Entertainment and produced by Grahame and Jack Corbyn.

== Personal life ==
Barker married Nick Jenkins at Bickleigh Castle, Devon, in September 2007. In 2010 she gave birth to her first child, a daughter. Her second child, and second daughter, was born in 2013. Her third child, a son, was born in 2016. She has lived in Ashtead, Surrey since 2016.

Barker has also done a certain amount of work for charity including presenting fashion shows for cancer charities. She was also part of the on-screen team at the International Broadcasting Convention in Amsterdam in 2006.
