= Paul Martin (TV presenter) =

British antiques dealer and TV presenter

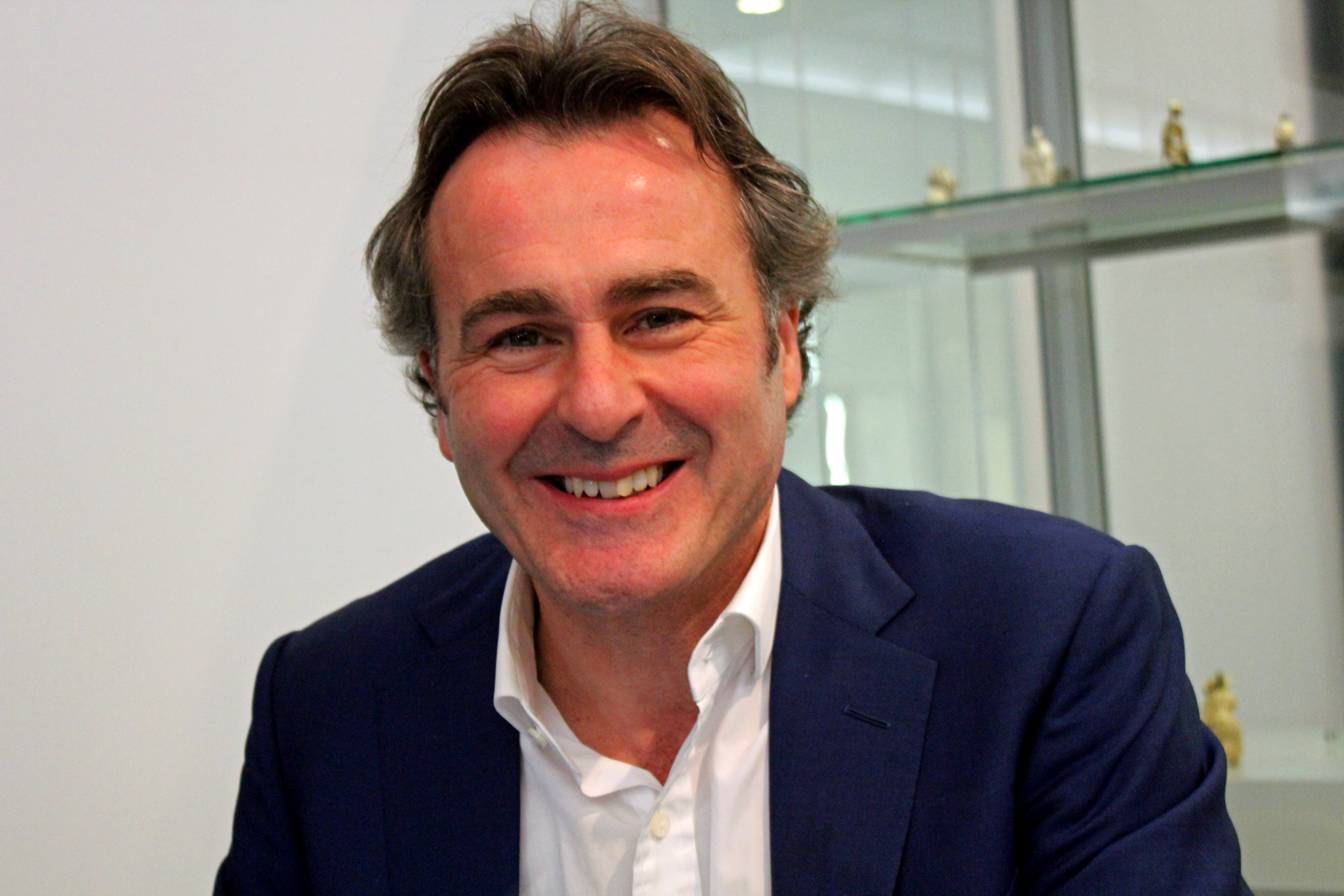
- Martin recording Flog It!, 2014
- Born: 5 January 1959 (age 67); Teddington, Middlesex, England
- Education: Falmouth Grammar School
- Alma mater: Falmouth College of Arts
- Occupations: Antiques dealer, session musician and television presenter
- Years active: 1982–present
- Known for: BBC antiques presenter
- Television: Flog It! Trust Me, I'm a Dealer; Paul Martin's Handmade Revolution; Street Auction; Make Me a Dealer; Curiosity
- Spouse: Charlotte Godfrey (m. 2007)
- Children: 2

Paul Martin (born 5 January 1959) is an English antiques dealer, best known for being the presenter of various BBC television antiques programmes including Flog It!, Trust Me, I'm a Dealer and Paul Martin's Handmade Revolution. In his earlier life he was a professional drummer.

== Biography ==
Martin was born in Teddington, Middlesex. His family subsequently moved to Cornwall, where he was educated at Falmouth Grammar School and then studied art and woodworking at Falmouth College of Arts (now Falmouth University).

He then developed parallel careers, as an antiques trader and dealer and as a session musician drummer. Martin worked with Average White Band, The Quireboys and The Dogs D'Amour in the 1990s.

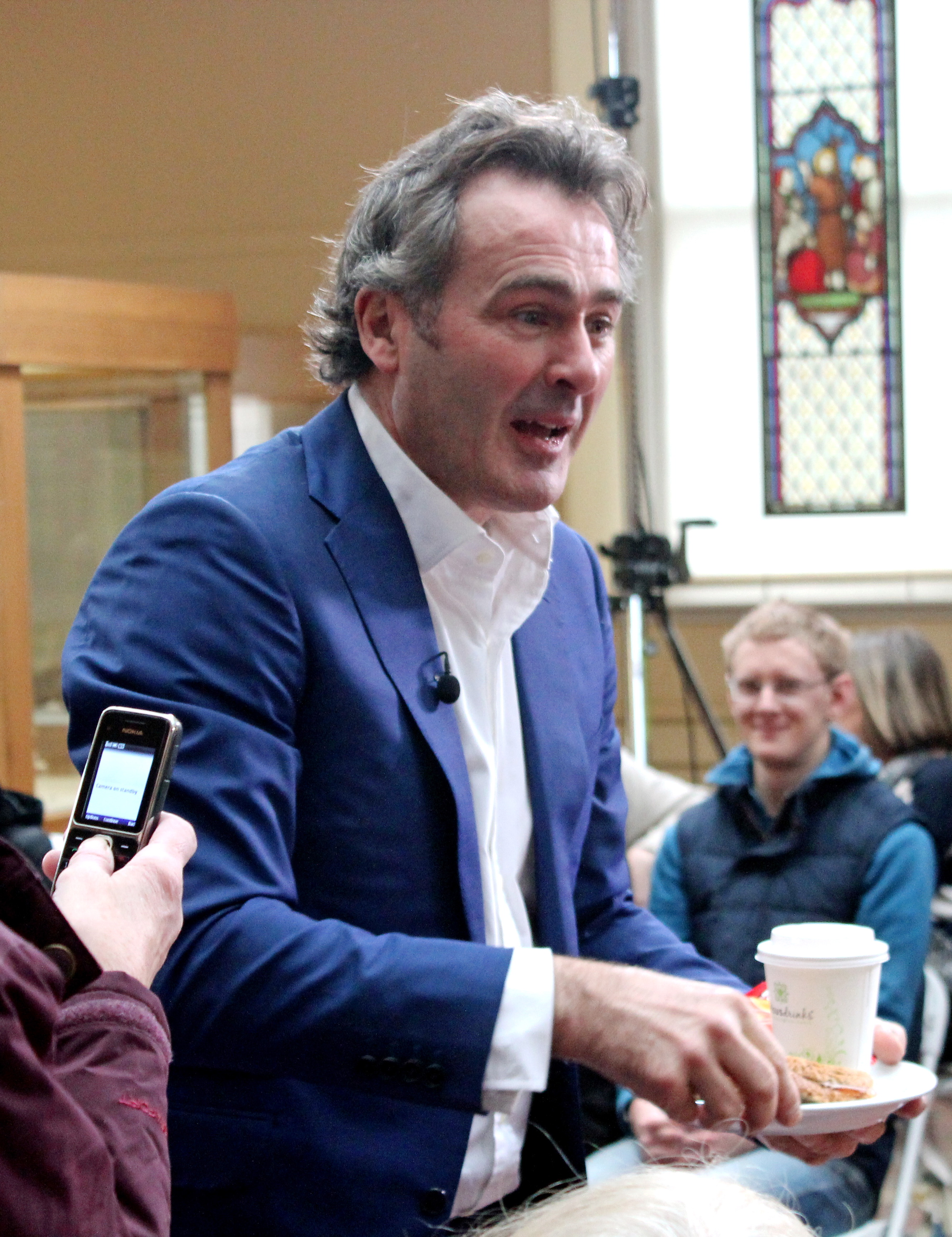
Martin during a recording of Flog It! at Birmingham Museum and Art Gallery, 2014

From the age of 25, he owned a pitch on London's Portobello Road. He also worked as an antiques props stylist for magazines including Marie Claire and New Woman, whilst undertaking larger projects designing antique sets for television shoots for BBC One's The Clothes Show and Granada TV. After Portobello Road, Martin ran The Table Gallery antiques shop on Kingsbury Street in Marlborough, Wiltshire. In 2020, the shop relocated to Corsham, Wiltshire, specialising in 17th- and 18th-century Welsh and English oak furniture and Victorian lavatories.

=== Television presenting ===
Martin was discovered by a team from BBC Bristol when he was interviewed about his passion for oak furniture. He was then signed up in 2002 to present Flog It!, which has led to a series of television shows and spin-off books.

In 2011 he presented To the Manor Reborn alongside Penelope Keith, covering the refurbishment of Avebury Manor in Wiltshire for the National Trust. In 2014, he began hosting I Never Knew That About Britain for the ITV network. He presented the BBC Countryfile spin-offs Summer Diaries, Spring Diaries, Autumn Diaries and Winter Diaries in 2016 and 2017.

On 2 October 2018, the BBC announced it would cancel Flog It!, but that Martin would return to host two new similar shows as part of its "modernised" new daytime schedule—one of which would use Martin's skills as a dealer to train members of the public, the second being an antiques-based game show. The first of these programmes, Make Me a Dealer, began its inaugural series on 5 November 2018, followed by the antiques game show Curiosity in spring 2019.

== Books ==
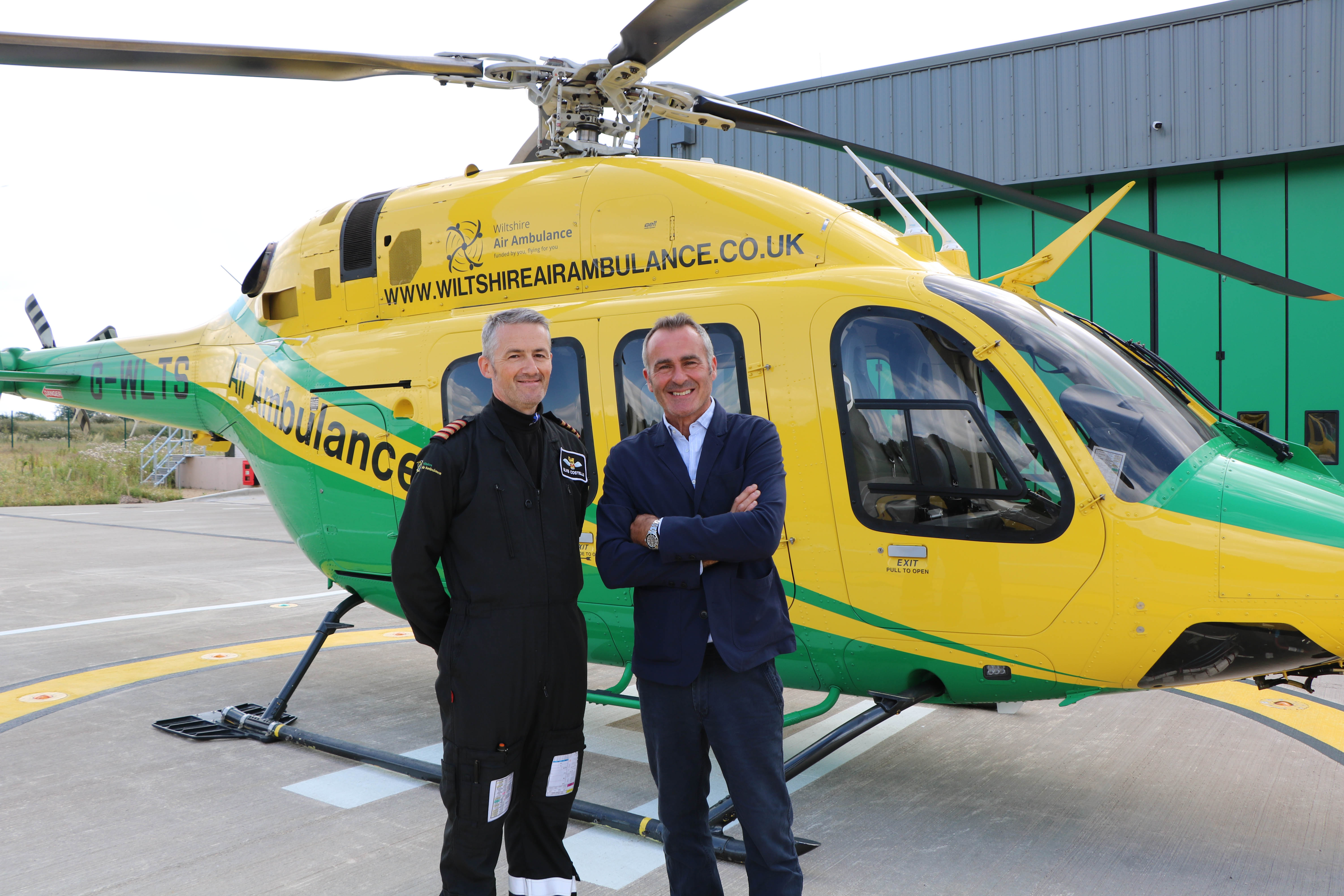
Martin with pilot David Costello, Wiltshire Air Ambulance

Paul Martin has written a popular book on antiques, Paul Martin: My World of Antiques, subtitled ‘Collect, buy and sell everyday antiques like an expert’. The book draws on his experiences on ‘Flog It!’ and includes chapters on various types of antiques and interviews with a number of other experts.

== Personal life ==
Martin married BBC production co-ordinator Charlotte Godfrey in 2007. They live in Seend, Wiltshire, on a smallholding with an arboretum. They have two children.

Martin is an ambassador for the Wiltshire and Bath Air Ambulance charity.
