= Cyril James Frost =

English painter

- Born: 1880; Croydon
- Died: 1971
- Education: Croydon College of Art
- Occupations: Painter, portraitist, printmaker, silversmith, school teacher

Cyril James Fenton Frost (1880–1971) was an English painter who specialised in portraiture. He also worked as a printmaker, as a silversmith, and as a teacher.

Frost was born in Croydon (then in Surrey), England, in 1880. He studied at Croydon College of Art, being taught there by Francis Ernest Jackson.

In 1942, he exhibited the painting "Tough" at the Royal Academy.

Also in 1942, an airman, Flight Sergeant Ernest Little, and his wife were billeted in Frost's Banbury home. Frost painted him in his flying gear, and the resultant portrait, "Return from Dusseldorf", was exhibited at the RA in 1943. In 2016, the then owners of the painting, Cherwell District Council, gave it to Little, who had not seen it since it was shown at the RA.

Frost also exhibited at the Royal Society of British Artists. He signed some of his works "C.J. Fenton Frost".

He studied silversmithing under George Hart (1882-1973). His silverwork was in the arts and crafts style, and his maker's mark consisted of the letters "C.J.F".

Frost was also principal of Bloxham School, Oxfordshire.

He died in 1971.

His works are in a number of public collections in the UK, including those of Oxfordshire County Museum, Banbury Town Council and Cherwell District Council.

In August 2019 the restoration of one of his portraits, in the ownership of the sitter's son, was shown on the BBC television programme The Repair Shop. It was restored by Lucia Scalisi.
