= Philip Serrell =

English auctioneer, antiques expert and television presenter

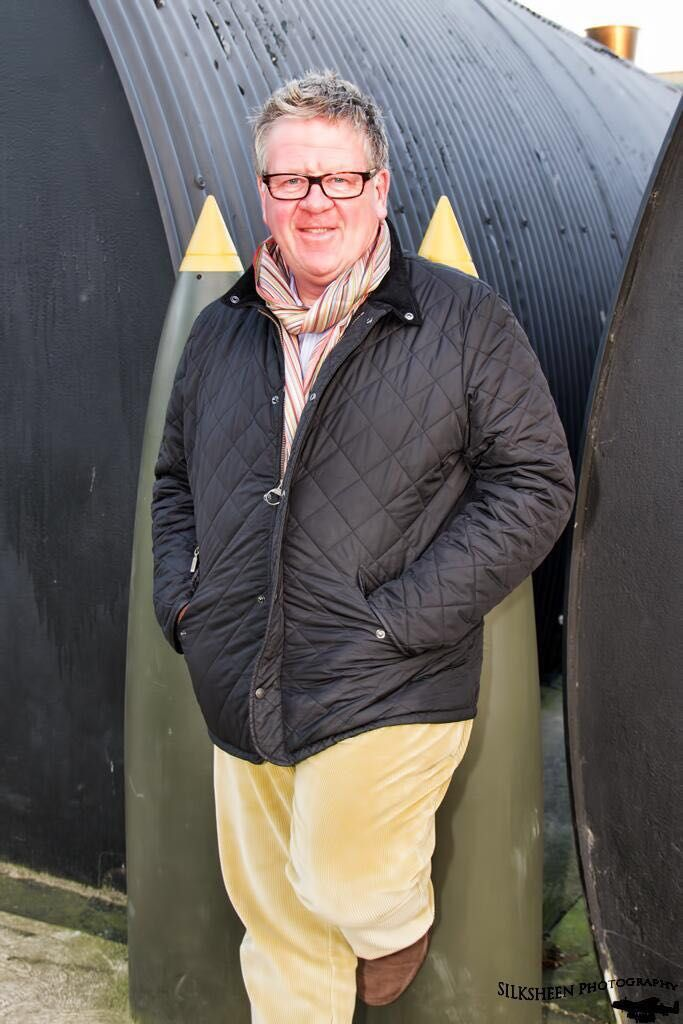
- Philip Serrell during Antiques Road Trip filming.
- Born: Philip Martyn Serrell; March 1954 (age 72); Kidderminster, Worcestershire, England
- Occupation: Auctioneer
- Spouse: Briony Serrell
- Children: Clementine Serrell
- Website: Official site

Philip Martyn Serrell (born March 1954) is an English auctioneer, antiques expert and television presenter who appears as regular presenter on BBC TV antiques programmes such as Bargain Hunt and Flog It!. He began his career as a livestock trade auctioneer, but he became a chartered surveyor in 1988 to analyse antiques. Serrell has also participated in musical charity events, performing as a singer with The Celebs.

== Early life ==
Serrell was born in Worcestershire into a farming family and attended the Royal Grammar School in Worcester, where he was a schoolmate of the Pakistani cricket captain Imran Khan. Serrell played both cricket and rugby for the school, prior to his attendance at, and graduation from, Loughborough College of Physical Education as a physical education teacher. In 2009, he received an Honorary Centenary Degree from Loughborough University.

== Career ==
Dissatisfied as a teacher, Serrell changed careers to become an auctioneer, working in the local livestock trade until qualifying as a chartered surveyor in 1988, specialising in fine art and antiques.

Serrell owns an auctioneers and valuers firm with offices in Worcester and a salesroom in Great Malvern, established in 1995. He has been a regular expert on the BBC series Bargain Hunt since 2016, also appearing on Flog It! and a couple of appearances on ITV's Dickinson's Real Deal. He has also featured on other BBC series Antiques Road Trip and Put Your Money Where Your Mouth Is.

Serrell has toured theatres as part of the "An Evening with..." shows. He has regularly appeared on BBC Local Radio, and has also written a biweekly column for the Worcester News.

== Music recordings ==
In 2017, Serrell recorded a Rock version of the classic "Sleigh Ride" in aid of BBC Children In Need, with fellow BBC Antique Experts Charles Hanson, Charlie Ross and James Braxton. The single peaked at number 1 on the Amazon Rock Charts.

In 2018, Serrell performed a new Christmas song called "Rock With Rudolph" with Ross, Braxton and 24 celebrities, under the name The Celebs. The song was released to raise money for Great Ormond Street Hospital. The music video debuted exclusively with The Sun on 29 November 2018 and had its first TV showing on Good Morning Britain on 30 November 2018. The song peaked at number two on the iTunes pop chart.

== Personal life ==
Serrell lives in Worcester.

== Published works ==
- An Auctioneer's Lot (ISBN 0340838957)
- Sold to the Man with the Tin Leg (ISBN 0340895020)
