= 2002 Rugby Borough Council election =

2002 UK local government election

Results of the 2002 Rugby Borough Council election

Elections to Rugby Borough Council were held on 2 May 2002. The whole council was up for election as a result of the boundary changes that had taken place since the last election in 2000. The council stayed under no overall control.

== Election result ==
Rugby local election result 2002
Party	Seats	Gains	Losses	Net gain/loss	Seats %	Votes %	Votes	+/−
Conservative	18				37.5	35.8	22,252	
Labour	16				33.3	27.2	16,910	
Liberal Democrats	10				20.8	30.2	18,735	
Independent	4				8.3	6.8	4,220	

== Ward results ==
Admirals (3)
Party	Candidate	Votes	%	±%
Labour	Andrew Coles	627		
Labour	Martin Eversfield	584		
Labour	Kathleen Hayter	572		
Conservative	Karl Cook	483		
Conservative	Richard Vereker	434		
Conservative	Felipe Tejero	428		
Liberal Democrats	Hilda Fletcher	173		
Liberal Democrats	Christopher Thoday	150		
Liberal Democrats	Lilian Pallikaropoulos	140		
Turnout		3,591		

Avon and Swift (2)
Party	Candidate	Votes	%	±%
Conservative	Hazel Bell	544		
Independent	David Carter	497		
Labour	Richard Best	185		
Liberal Democrats	Mary Andrews	154		
Turnout		1,380		

Benn (3)
Party	Candidate	Votes	%	±%
Labour	James Shera	674		
Labour	Keith Cassidy	673		
Labour	Francis Whistance	591		
Liberal Democrats	Susan Roodhouse	372		
Liberal Democrats	Felicity Bocus	337		
Liberal Democrats	James Hotten	325		
Conservative	Christopher Pacel-Day	270		
Turnout		3,242		

Bilton (3)
Party	Candidate	Votes	%	±%
Conservative	Lionel Franklyn	1,129		
Conservative	Craig Humphrey	1,067		
Conservative	David Wright	937		
Liberal Democrats	Phyllis Allen	500		
Labour	Anne Jones	435		
Liberal Democrats	Faye Morris	377		
Liberal Democrats	Beatrice O'Dwyer	320		
Turnout		4,765		

Brownsover North (2)
Party	Candidate	Votes	%	±%
Conservative	Simon Anderson	521		
Conservative	Carolyn Robbins	506		
Labour	Steven Birkett	239		
Liberal Democrats	Heidi Thomas	198		
Liberal Democrats	Anna Trevitt	89		
Turnout		1,553		

Brownsover South (2)
Party	Candidate	Votes	%	±%
Labour	Alan Webb	365		
Labour	Claire Edwards	363		
Conservative	Paul King	298		
Conservative	David Henry	285		
Liberal Democrats	Anthony Godwin	74		
Liberal Democrats	Mervyn Leah	65		
Turnout		1,450		

Caldecott (3)
Party	Candidate	Votes	%	±%
Liberal Democrats	Christopher Holman	979		
Liberal Democrats	Gwendoline Hotten	922		
Liberal Democrats	Thomas Hardgrave	919		
Conservative	David Barby	598		
Conservative	Paul Newsome	521		
Conservative	Virginia Taylor	517		
Labour	Brenda Clarke	368		
Turnout		4,824		

Dunchurch and Knightlow (3)
Party	Candidate	Votes	%	±%
Liberal Democrats	Ronald Ravenhall	1,211		
Conservative	William Shields	1,084		
Conservative	Mark Pawsey	1,069		
Conservative	Peter Butlin	880		
Liberal Democrats	Ian Smith	816		
Liberal Democrats	Ian Morris	780		
Labour	Katherine King	329		
Turnout		6,169		

Earl Craven and Wolston (3)
Party	Candidate	Votes	%	±%
Independent	Laurence Wright	1,204		
Labour	Douglas Hodkinson	802		
Conservative	David Elson	791		
Labour	Anthony Harris	733		
Conservative	Kevin Taylor	714		
Turnout		4,244		

Eastlands (3)
Party	Candidate	Votes	%	±%
Liberal Democrats	Jeremy Roodhouse	1,441		
Liberal Democrats	Susan Peach	1,353		
Liberal Democrats	Neil Sandison	1,232		
Conservative	Jennifer Ferguson	306		
Labour	Vasanji Chhana	279		
Conservative	Dunstan Vavasour	255		
Turnout		4,866		

Fosse (2)
Party	Candidate	Votes	%	±%
Conservative	Neil Campbell	508		
Conservative	William Clarke	470		
Liberal Democrats	Richard Gunstone	457		
Liberal Democrats	Alexander Illingworth	410		
Independent	Reginald French	356		
Independent	Ronald Lissaman	234		
Turnout		2,435		

Hillmorton (3)
Party	Candidate	Votes	%	±%
Conservative	William Sewell	656		
Liberal Democrats	Jesstina Upstone	655		
Labour	Terance Deery	629		
Liberal Democrats	Richard Allanach	582		
Liberal Democrats	Stanley Williams	528		
Conservative	Pauline Elson	477		
Labour	Douglas Hall	475		
Independent	Kathryn Lawrence	456		
Conservative	Amanda Lane	413		
Independent	James Rule	286		
Turnout		5,157		

Lawford and Kings Newnham (2)
Party	Candidate	Votes	%	±%
Independent	Patricia Wyatt	495		
Conservative	Patricia Collett	408		
Labour	David Winkle	397		
Labour	Peter Currie	258		
Turnout		1,558		

Leam Valley
Party	Candidate	Votes	%	±%
Conservative	Gordon Collett	638	85.5	
Labour	Benjamin Ferrett	108	14.5	
Majority		530	71.0	
Turnout		746		

New Bilton (3)
Party	Candidate	Votes	%	±%
Labour	Ishvarlal Mistry	793		
Labour	Frank Blackman	749		
Labour	Donald Williams	717		
Conservative	Stanley Humphries	535		
Liberal Democrats	John Upstone	417		
Turnout		3,211		

Newbold (3)
Party	Candidate	Votes	%	±%
Labour	Raymond Kirby	945		
Labour	Denham Cavanagh	913		
Labour	John Wells	910		
Conservative	Caroline Wright	457		
Liberal Democrats	Vivienne Seakins	382		
Turnout		3,607		

Overslade (3)
Party	Candidate	Votes	%	±%
Conservative	Fiona Barrington-Ward	759		
Conservative	Richard Lane	744		
Conservative	Kamaljit Kaur	704		
Labour	Christina Avis	682		
Labour	Bryan Levy	595		
Labour	Ramesh Srivastava	573		
Liberal Democrats	Dorothy Neville	262		
Liberal Democrats	Dianna Hardgrave	256		
Liberal Democrats	Gina Oliver	241		
Turnout		4,816		

Paddox (2)
Party	Candidate	Votes	%	±%
Liberal Democrats	Richard Dodd	831		
Liberal Democrats	Glenda Allanach	752		
Conservative	Stephen Tompsett	313		
Conservative	Barbara Johnston	284		
Labour	Michael Hirons	186		
Labour	Nurjahan Shera	161		
Turnout		2,527		

Ryton on Dunsmore
Party	Candidate	Votes	%	±%
Independent	Ronald Backholler	344	60.5	
Independent	Bernard O'Hara	127	22.3	
Conservative	Philip Cropper	98	17.2	
Majority		217	38.2	
Turnout		569		

Wolvey
Party	Candidate	Votes	%	±%
Conservative	Adrian Warwick	418	62.0	
Independent	William Chase	221	32.8	
Liberal Democrats	Sally Ravenhall	35	5.2	
Majority		197	29.2	
Turnout		674		
