= Anita Manning =

Scottish antiques expert and television personality

- Born: 1 December 1947 (age 78); Glasgow, Scotland
- Occupations: Antiques expert, television personality
- Years active: 1979–present
- Television: Antiques Roadshow; Bargain Hunt; Flog It!; Antiques Road Trip
- Height: 155 cm (5 ft 1 in)

Anita Manning (born 1 December 1947) is a Scottish antiques expert and television personality from Glasgow. She is well known for her appearances since 2010 as an expert and presenter on the BBC's Bargain Hunt, Flog It! and the Antiques Road Trip. She is claimed to be the first female auctioneer in Scotland.

== Career ==
Manning's father used to take her to auctions on Sauchiehall Street, in Glasgow and she grew to love antiques. She first got into the antiques business in the 1970s after buying a bed from an Irish dealer. He offered her a job as a buyer.

After studying physical education and specialising in dance at Aberdeen and Edinburgh, Manning was a teacher before she got married and had children. As a young mother, she developed a knowledge of antiques by buying furniture from auctions. After her first visit to Glasgow as a buyer, she bought and sold furniture in England and Ireland for about three years, driving all around the country in a truck.

Together with her daughter Lala, Manning established the Glasgow auction house Great Western Auctions in 1989. Manning's son Luke lived in Hong Kong for a number of years, while her mother lived in Australia for the last 35 years of her life. The Sunday Post and The Daily Telegraph have claimed that she was Scotland's first female auctioneer. Luke Manning now also works as director, auctioneer and valuer at the auction.

In 2016 Manning set a new record for the largest profit on a single item on the Antiques Road Trip. A Buddha statue she had purchased for £50 sold for £3,800, a 7,500% profit. This record was broken in September 2017 when Paul Laidlaw bought a Chambre Automatique De Bertsch sub-miniature camera for £60 and sold it at auction for £20,000.
