= Bargain Hunt =

British television series

- Bargain Hunt logo (Series 24 onwards)
- Genre: Game Show
- Presented by: David Dickinson (2000–2004); Tim Wonnacott (2003–2016); Charles Hanson; Eric Knowles; Paul Laidlaw; Charlie Ross; Anita Manning; Natasha Raskin Sharp; Christina Trevanion; Roo Irvine; Caroline Hawley; Catherine Southon; Danny Sebastian
- Opening theme: "Horny Baby" by Dust Devil (2000–2009)
- Country of origin: United Kingdom
- Original language: English
- No. of series: 75
- No. of episodes: 1,903 + more

Production
- Running time: 45 mins
- Production companies: BBC Bristol (2000–2014); BBC Cymru Wales (2014–2017); BBC Studios Factual Entertainment Productions (2017–present)

Original release
- Network: BBC One
- Release: 13 March 2000 – present

Bargain Hunt is a British television programme in which two pairs of contestants are challenged to buy antiques from shops or a fair and then sell them in an auction for a profit. It has aired on BBC One since 13 March 2000 in a daytime version, and from 22 August 2002 to 13 November 2004 in a primetime version.

Bargain Hunt was originally presented by David Dickinson. From 2003 to January 2016, it was presented by Tim Wonnacott. In 2016, the format changed to a rota of hosts from a "team of experts" fronting the series.

== Format ==
Bargain Hunt has undergone various TV formats and rule changes since it premiered in 2000. Most episodes are 45 minutes in length, though 30-minute versions and one-hour "live" editions have also been produced.

Two teams – designated the "Reds" and the "Blues" – compete. Each team has two members, who wear fleeces that correspond to their team's colour. The contestants in most episodes are members of the public, though some shows feature teams of celebrity players instead. At the beginning of the show, each team is given a set amount of money with which to purchase antiques. The objective is to find items that will earn the team a profit when later sold at auction. Each team is accompanied by an antiques trade expert, though it is the contestants' decision whether to heed the advice given by their expert. After the contestants have completed their purchases and presented them to the host, home viewers are shown a "what the auctioneer thinks" segment in which the auctioneer appraises the buys and gives the auction estimate. At the auction, as each item is sold, the host compares the auction sale price to the price originally paid by the team, with the difference being either subtracted from or added to the team's total. If the final total shows a profit, the team receives that profit in cash; otherwise, the team receives nothing. The profit/loss does not take into account buyer's premium (commission) or Value Added Tax (a governmental sales tax).

The show is punctuated by footage of the host visiting a place of historical interest, such as a stately home or museum, and talking about the items housed there.

In the early David Dickinson-era episodes, teams were given £200 each, and could buy as many or as few items as they liked within the hour given to wander around a trade fair. The item rule was later changed so that teams have to buy three items. After Tim Wonnacott became host, the money was increased to £300, and a new feature called the "swap item" was introduced. Each expert chose an item of their own, and the team could replace one of their own choices with the "swap item" if they wished to. The host, when offering the option to a team, would often ask, "Swap or No Swap?" Originally, the experts were given an unspecified amount of money to buy the extra item; the rule was later changed so that the experts could only use whatever money was left of the team's £300 budget (the remaining money was referred to by Wonnacott as the "leftover lolly"). Under the revised rule, if a team used its entire budget, the expert could not choose a "swap item".

The "swap" rule was changed again in 2006 (Series 14), becoming the "bonus buy". The expert is still given any "leftover lolly" to buy this bonus item, which is entered into the auction. Just after the auction of their own items, and before that of the bonus item, teams must decide whether the auction results of the bonus item should be added to their own auction lots. Teams can potentially add to their profit with the bonus item, but it can also subtract from a team's earnings if it loses money.

In a series in 2014, an alternative bonus item was purchased by the expert with "Tim's Ton", (£100 provided by Tim). The teams then had to decide on whether to select the 'team's bonus buy' (bought with the leftover lolly), Tim's bonus buy (bought with Tim's ton) or neither. Tim would also make his prediction as to which bonus buy would make the larger profit or smaller loss (which he called Wonnacott's winner).

Series 52 in 2019 brought a change to the rules with two challenges, the 'Big Spend Challenge' and the 'Presenter's Challenge' added. The teams have to spend at least £75 on one item, and buy an item relating to a specific category or has a feature. For example, something you see in a study or features flowers. The challenges can be done with one item. Other changes include the contestants introducing themselves to camera, rather than to the presenter, and the bonus buy is now revealed to the contestants in the auction room after the sale of the first three items.

It has been noted by the Daily Express that on average, most contestants' items tend to lose money: the teams are paying retail prices at fairs, whereas auction prices are generally lower. Large profits are fairly rare, though it is not particularly unusual for contestants to take home a small profit. Teams achieving the difficult feat of earning a profit on all three items are awarded a "golden gavel"; originally a wooden trophy, but latterly a lapel pin.

The episode ends with the presenter, experts and the contestants kicking one of their legs in the air, in a tradition that traces its roots back to a time when Wonnacott was hosting the show.

== Production ==
Four or five programmes are usually made at each antiques fair and filming can take all day. Programmes are named after the locations where they are filmed.

Programmes are not necessarily broadcast in the sequence filmed, and one set of episodes can be split across different series.

== Bargain Hunt Famous Finds ==
Bargain Hunt
- Starring: Tim Wonnacott
- Country of origin: United Kingdom
- No. of series: 2
- No. of episodes: 20

Production
- Running time: 45 minutes

Original release
- Network: BBC Two
- Release: 1 December 2008 – 3 April 2009

A separate celebrity version of the show premiered on 1 December 2008 on BBC Two featuring team pairs made up of one well-known personality accompanied by a friend or family member. The show is presented by Tim Wonnacott and the format is the same as the main show but Wonnacott's visit to see an antiques collection or stately home is replaced by a feature where each celebrity contestant discusses antiques with him. Wonnacott might show them a borrowed collection of antiques brought along for the show that he believes would interest the celebrity (this may be related to the occupation of the celebrity), and in turn the celebrity shows Wonnacott an antique or collectable belonging to themselves. There is no suggestion of what to do with any profit if the teams make any, but most decide to give it to charity. Series 2 began on 30 March 2009 and ended on 3 April 2009.

=== Celebrity contestants ===
Series 1	Series 2
Kelly Holmes and Sally Gunnell	Henry Cooper and Geoff Capes
Lembit Öpik and Edwina Currie	Tony Blackburn and Alvin Stardust
Helen Lederer and Bobby Davro	Johnny Ball and Eddie Large
Ruth Badger and Tamara Beckwith	Gary Rhodes and Brian Turner
Jilly Goolden and Theo Paphitis	Janet Ellis and Valerie Singleton
Connie Fisher and Ian 'H' Watkins	Christopher Timothy and Lysette Anthony
Julian Clary and Matthew Cottle	Janice Long and Mike Read
Rakie Ayola and Charles Dale	Toyah Willcox and Kiki Dee
Keith Chegwin and Sally James	Dennis Taylor and Willie Thorne
Ricky Groves and Jilly Cooper	Vanessa Feltz and Nicki Chapman

== History ==
Originally a daytime show when launched in 2000 with David Dickinson as host. Later a primetime version, also hosted by Dickinson, was also broadcast (2002–04), which was similar to the daytime show except that the teams' budget was increased to £500. It was on the primetime edition of the show that the record was set for the greatest profit earned on Bargain Hunt. A team led by Michael Hogben purchased a Royal Worcester box at Ardingly Fair for £140; the item made £800 in the live primetime auction.

When Dickinson quit the daytime show to concentrate on the primetime version, his place was taken by Tim Wonnacott, an antiques expert already well known to UK viewers as a long-standing expert on the Antiques Roadshow.

In April 2005, it was announced that the primetime version of Bargain Hunt had been axed; however the daytime version continued. Repeats of the daytime version (from the Dickinson era) are shown on BBC Entertainment and BBC America.

The show occasionally features well-known contestants, such as 'Allo 'Allo! stars Gorden Kaye and Sue Hodge.

The show airs on the Australian Foxtel and Austar cable television channel, Lifestyle, at 6.30 pm weekdays. The show also airs on the Seven Network's digital station 7Two (Prime's 7Two, in Regional Areas), weekdays at 11am and 6.30pm.

Several episodes recorded in late-2014 were presented by Anita Manning, Charlie Ross, Christina Trevanion, Natasha Raskin, Charles Hanson, and Paul Laidlaw whilst Wonnacott took part in the BBC 1 entertainment programme Strictly Come Dancing.

== Special programmes ==
Following the death of expert David Barby on 25 July 2012, the programme paid tribute to him on 1 October 2012 by showing a montage of clips featuring his appearances on the show.

=== 500th programme ===
On 15 October 2007, the 500th show was broadcast. This show differed from a normal show in that both teams were made up of experts – the red team featured David Barby and Philip Serrell (described as the "old" team), while the blue team featured Kate Bliss and Charles Hanson (deemed the "young" team); the "bonus items" were purchased by Tim Wonnacott himself. The teams were given £500 to spend, rather than the usual £300, with any profits going to charities chosen by the team members. The red team made a profit of £245, beating the blue team's break-even. The show also featured out-takes and memorable clips from previous shows.

=== 10th anniversary ===
The programme marked its tenth anniversary on air with a week of special editions broadcast between 15 and 19 March 2010. These followed a similar format to the 500th episode, except that the teams were given only the usual £300 to buy items, with a separate £100 per team allotted for the bonus items.

=== 20th anniversary ===
The programme marked its twentieth anniversary on air with a week of special editions broadcast between 19 and 23 October 2020. Only some of the usual rules applied. The teams had one hour and £300 to buy three items to take to auction, shopping on their own, in a relay.

=== BBC Music Day specials ===
On 28 September 2018, Bargain Hunt aired a special episode as part of BBC Music Day. The Red Team consisted of Bez and Rowetta from Happy Mondays and the Blue Team consisted of Jarvis Cocker and Candida Doyle from Pulp.

The Red Team won the episode by earning a profit of £8. However, it was later discovered that Bez's girlfriend had bought two of the Red Team's items. As it was and remains forbidden in the rules of the programme for friends and family of the teams to buy items the teams were selling, the Blue Team were made winners and Bez had to hand over £8 from his own pocket.

On 26 September 2019, the second BBC Music Day special was shown with The Darkness (lead singer Justin Hawkins and bassist Frankie Poullain) competing against Feeder (lead singer Grant Nicholas and bassist Taka Hirose) at the Stamford Meadows antiques fair in Lincolnshire.

=== Doctors special ===
Following the cancellation of fellow BBC Daytime series Doctors in 2024, Bargain Hunt aired a Doctors special. It featured four long-term cast members from the series: Dex Lee, Dido Miles, Sarah Moyle and Kia Pegg. It aired on 14 November 2024, which also marked the date when Doctors' final episode was transmitted.

== Presenters ==
- Christina Trevanion
- Eric Knowles
- Natasha Raskin Sharp
- Charlie Ross
- Caroline Hawley
- Roo Irvine
- Danny Sebastian

== Experts ==
- Lesley Kiddell-Spencer (2025- )
- Serhat Ahmet (2025-)
- Izzie Balmer (2022–)
- Raj Bisram
- Kate Bliss (née Alcock)
- John Cameron
- Stephanie Connell (2019–)
- Ben Cooper
- David Fergus (2025-)
- Nick Hall
- Charles Hanson
- Richard Madley
- Thomas Forrester (formerly Plant)
- David Harper
- Irita Marriott (2023–)
- Gary Pe
- Jonathan Pratt
- Philip Serrell
- Catherine Southon
- Mark Stacey
- Tim Weeks
- Colin Young

=== Past experts ===
- Philip Allwood
- Mark Ashley
- David Barby (2000–2012, his death)
- Kate Bateman
- James Braxton
- Pippa Deeley
- Dean Goodwin (2000)
- Chris Gower
- Paul Hayes
- Karen van Hoey Smith (2004)
- Michael Hogben (2000–2006)
- Kevin Jackson (2000–2005)
- Paul Laidlaw
- James Lewis
- Anita Manning
- Henry Meadows
- Toby Moy (2000)
- Adam Partridge
- Natasha Raskin Sharp
- Ochuko Ojiri (2019–2025)
- Susan Orringe
- Charlie Ross
- Jeremy Lamond
- Nigel Smith
- Sally Stratton (2001–2002)
- Elizabeth Talbot
- Christina Trevanion
- Louise Weir (2000)
- Claire Rawle
- Roo Irvine
- Danny Sebastian
- Caroline Hawley

== In popular culture ==
In March 2003, ITV children's TV channel CITV's Saturday morning children's programme SMTV Live introduced a parody sketch of the programme entitled "Garbage Hunt" with presenter Des Clarke parodying Dickinson as "David Dustbin" looking at old unused merchandise from people's rubbish bins.
