= Charles Hanson =

English auctioneer and television personality

- Born: 29 May 1978 (age 48); Holbrook, Derbyshire, England
- Occupations: Auctioneer; television presenter
- Years active: 1999–present (surveying and auctioneering); 2002–present (television)
- Known for: Bargain Hunt; Flog It!; Antiques Road Trip

Charles Hanson (born 29 May 1978) is an English auctioneer, and television personality. He is best known for his appearances as an antiques expert on the television programmes Bargain Hunt, Flog It! and Antiques Road Trip.

== Career ==
=== Business ===
After gaining his surveying qualification, Hanson started his career in 1999 at Christie's working as a student intern in the European Ceramics and Glass Department. Subsequently, he worked for antique houses in Cheshire and Staffordshire before founding Hansons Auctioneers and Valuers in Etwall, Derbyshire, in August 2005. In 2016 his company opened a department specialising in coins and antiquities, named Historica.

The most expensive lot Hanson has sold was a Qianlong period Chinese porcelain vase that had been used by the seller as a doorstop for 36 years; the final bid was £650,000. Other significant sales include the medals of Rowland Hill, 1st Viscount Hill (a commander at the Battle of Waterloo), and a brooch which had belonged to Katherine Neville, Baroness Hastings.

Hanson has also taken part in charity auctions for organisations including the Herd of Sheffield and Careline.

=== Television ===
Since 2002 Hanson has appeared on BBC television programme Bargain Hunt where he acts as an adviser to one of two teams of contestants who buy and sell antiques and attempt to gain a profit. In November 2018 he appeared as an expert on a celebrity edition of Bargain Hunt in which stars of the BBC series Casualty made up the teams and tried to raise money for Children in Need.

Hanson made regular appearances on Flog It!. From 2010 he has also taken part in Antiques Road Trip in which he travels between antique shops in the United Kingdom and competes with a fellow antiques expert to make the most profit. In 2016 he appeared on For What It's Worth.

== Music ==
In 2017 Hanson, with fellow BBC antique experts Philip Serrell, Charlie Ross and James Braxton, recorded a rock version of the classic "Sleigh Ride" in aid of BBC Children in Need. It was produced by father-and-son team Grahame and Jack Corbyn, and released digitally on independent record label Saga Entertainment. The single peaked at number 1 on the Amazon Rock Charts.

== Personal life ==
Hanson was born in Holbrook, Derbyshire, on 29 May 1978, to Philip Hanson and his wife Gillian.

In 2010, Hanson married Rebecca Ludlam. In August 2012, Hanson was diagnosed with testicular cancer. Hanson raised £39,000 for the Stillbirth and Neonatal Death Society (now known as Sands) by completing the Great North Run in September 2013.

Hanson lives in Derbyshire; previously with his wife and two children but was prohibited from visiting the marital home in February 2024 at a court hearing.

=== Domestic abuse allegations ===
In December 2023, he faced domestic abuse charges. The alleged offences included two counts of assault occasioning actual bodily harm, two counts of assault and engaging in controlling and coercive behaviour. He was released on bail to appear in court on 10 January 2024. He appeared for a pre-trial hearing at Derby Crown Court on 7 February 2024, where he pleaded not guilty to the charges. The full trial date was set for just over one year later on 10 February 2025. He was defended by Sasha Wass. On 28 February, the jury returned unanimous not guilty verdicts on all counts.

== See also ==
- Bargain Hunt
