= Antiques Road Trip =

British television series (2010–)

- Also known as: Celebrity Antiques Road Trip (2011–)
- Narrated by: Tim Wonnacott
- Country of origin: United Kingdom
- Original language: English
- No. of series: 32 (regular series); 13 (celebrity series)
- No. of episodes: 675 (regular series); 246 (celebrity series)

Production
- Running time: 30 minutes (2010); 45 minutes (2011–)
- Production company: STV Studios

Original release
- Network: BBC Two (2010–2012); BBC One (2013–)
- Release: 8 March 2010 – present

Related
- Put Your Money Where Your Mouth Is

Antiques Road Trip (also known as Celebrity Antiques Road Trip) is a BBC television series produced by STV Studios. It was first shown on BBC Two from 2010 to 2012, and has been shown on BBC One since 2013.

== Format ==
=== Regular ===
In the programme two antiques experts compete against each other. They get a budget of £200 with which to buy antiques and collectibles, that are then sold at auction. After each auction, the amount in each expert's kitty after costs are deducted becomes their budget for the next leg. The winner is the expert who makes the greater profit over five legs, with whatever money is left in the kitty at the end being donated to the charity Children in Need.

From 2023 the budget system was changed, with each expert having a week's budget of £1,500 to cover five legs, to be spent at the discretion of each expert across the week. There is no reinvestment of profits back into the budget, or deduction of losses. At the end of each leg, the winner is the expert with the highest profit (or smallest loss) at auction; and at the end of the week, the overall winner is the expert who has won the highest number of legs. The net profits at the end of each week are donated to the charity Children in Need. This new format has been described as a terrible disappointment by some long time viewers, others think the format and the additional cash have given the format a new lease of life.

Each leg is a single programme, normally broadcast stripped from Monday to Friday. The experts travel to their different destinations in a classic car, which changes each week.

Experts competing on the series have included many of the presenters and experts on other antiques-focused series: Bargain Hunt or Flog It!. These include Charlie Ross, David Barby, Natasha Raskin Sharp, and Roo Irvine. Irvine and Will Axon first appeared on the series in their day jobs as a shop owner and auctioneer before becoming experts on the show.

=== Celebrity Antiques Road Trip ===
A celebrity version Celebrity Antiques Road Trip has been airing since 2011, in which each expert is paired up with a celebrity and each programme is a self-contained contest held over a single leg.

== Production ==
The series began as an ultimately unbroadcast pilot in August 2009. This original preliminary version had the two experts, David Harper and Kate Bliss, each driving a classic car, and free to roam where they chose within a "work-day" time limit (9 a.m. to 5 p.m.) to buy up antiques with their £200 budget, with the goal of making the most profit when entered into auction two days later. They were encouraged to spend the entirety of their £200, even if it meant using any leftover on small antique trinkets, with potential penalty for not spending enough by deducting a percentage from profits. In this version, the experts only interacted at the outset of the episode and at the final auction, and the episode was 'self contained' - i.e. it wasn't part of a week-long trip. Potential was seen in the format for a series, but several tweaks were made. It was decided to have the two experts travel around together in the same car, allowing for interaction between the pair, and to make the 'road trip' span five days, and with a more designated overall route. The goal of spending the entire budget or being penalised, was also dropped. In the original pilot, each expert could nominate any proceeds to be donated to a charity of their choice; in the actual series Children in Need became the solo umbrella charity for any proceeds.

Filming of each episode of the series does generally take place within a single day, although the actual length of a day may be simulated, i.e. it may actually be filmed over several days, but within the timespan that a single day would allow. Although many episodes of the week-long trips are indeed filmed on subsequent days, occasionally there may be a day's gap filming between some episodes, to allow the experts time to tend to their own shops or auction businesses. The two included segments per episode where each expert will visit a local point of historical interest, are filmed a few days later, with the celebrities wearing the same clothes as in the rest of the episode so as not to break continuity.

== Records ==
The records for the largest profit on a single item, the highest sale price for a single item and the largest total profit on one road trip is held by Paul Laidlaw, who in one of the 2017 series (Series 15, Episode 5) bought a Chambre Automatique De Bertsch sub-miniature camera for £60 and sold it at auction for £20,000 (a 33,233% profit). The previous records for highest sale price for a single item and largest profit on a road trip was held by Anita Manning, who in 2016 purchased a Buddha statue for £50, which sold for £3,800 (a 7,500% profit).

The record for the largest profit margin on a single item is 33,650%. It was set by Charlie Ross when in the 2012 series, he bought a chipped Staffordshire elephant clock for £8 which sold for £2,700. This was also the largest profit made on a single item until Manning broke that record in 2016.

== Transmissions ==
=== Regular series ===
Series	Start date	End date	Episodes
1	8 March 2010	3 April 2010	20
2	3 January 2011	11 February 2011	30
3	12 September 2011	21 October 2011	30
4	13 February 2012	23 March 2012	30
5	1 October 2012	9 November 2012	30
6	7 January 2013	15 February 2013	30
7	4 November 2013	24 January 2014	30
8	24 February 2014	13 June 2014	30
9	22 September 2014	17 October 2014	20
10	5 January 2015	30 January 2015	20
11	7 September 2015	9 October 2015	25
12	4 January 2016	5 February 2016	25
13	5 September 2016	30 September 2016	20
14	2 January 2017	27 January 2017	20
15	25 September 2017	20 October 2017	20
16	2 January 2018	26 January 2018	20
17	3 September 2018	5 October 2018	25
18	7 January 2019	8 February 2019	25
19	2 September 2019	4 October 2019	25
20	6 January 2020	7 February 2020	25
21	9 November 2020	18 December 2020	25
22	10 May 2021	11 June 2021	25
23	6 September 2021	8 October 2021	25
24	3 January 2022	4 February 2022	25
25	12 September 2022	14 October 2022	25
26	13 February 2023	17 March 2023	25
27	13 November 2023	15 December 2023	25
28	19 August 2024	13 September 2024	25
28	8 December 2025	12 December 2025	25
29	4 November 2024	29 November 2024	20
30	10 February 2025	7 March 2025	20
31	10 November 2025	5 December 2025	20
32	26 January 2026	27 February 2026	15
33	14 September 2026	2 October 2026	20
33	TBC	TBC	20

=== Celebrity series ===
Series	Start date	End date	Episodes
1	24 October 2011	7 November 2011	10
2	3 September 2012	23 November 2012	20
3	4 November 2013	2 December 2013	20
4	5 September 2014	7 October 2014	20
5	17 November 2015	28 January 2016	20
6	14 November 2016	14 December 2016	20
7	13 November 2017	18 December 2017	20
8	5 November 2018	23 September 2019	20
9	7 October 2019	28 February 2020	20
10	9 November 2021	16 December 2021	20
11	23 October 2022	29 December 2022	20
12	10 October 2023	30 January 2024	20
13	6 November 2024	9 April 2025	16
