= Put Your Money Where Your Mouth Is (TV programme) =

- Genre: Factual Game show
- Presented by: Stephen Taylor Woodrow
- Country of origin: United Kingdom
- Original language: English
- No. of series: 14
- No. of episodes: 309

Production
- Running time: 45 minutes
- Production company: Reef Television

Original release
- Network: BBC One
- Release: 10 March 2008 – 18 June 2010
- Network: BBC Two
- Release: 14 February 2011 – 13 May 2012
- Network: BBC One
- Release: 18 February 2013 – 19 May 2017

Related
- Put Your Money Where Your Mouth Is: Food; Chefs: Put Your Menu Where Your Mouth Is

Put Your Money Where Your Mouth Is is a BBC television series that originally aired on BBC One from 10 March 2008 to 18 June 2010. It later moved to BBC Two where it aired from 14 February 2011 to 13 May 2012. It returned to BBC One where it aired from 18 February 2013 to 19 May 2017.

A spin-off titled Put Your Money Where Your Mouth Is: Food aired on BBC Two from 5 May to 5 June 2009. Another spinn-off titled Chefs: Put Your Menu Where Your Mouth Is aired on BBC One from 8 to 26 April 2013.

== Series overview ==
=== Original series ===
The show's format featured two individuals, often antiques experts but sometimes celebrities, who used up to £1,000 of their own money to purchase one or more items. They then attempted to resell the item at a higher price, the difference going to the contestant's charity of choice. Each episode occurred at a different sales venue, such as a car boot sale, fête, or public auction. The contestants were often given rules they had to follow, such as limiting purchases to a certain type of object or purchasing objects within a limited geographic area.

Series	Episodes	Originally released	
Series	Episodes	First released	Last released
1	9	10 March 2008	20 March 2008
2	20	6 October 2008	31 October 2008
3	30	10 May 2010	18 June 2010
4	30	14 February 2011	25 March 2011
5	30	2 January 2012	10 February 2012
6	30	26 March 2012	13 May 2012
7	30	18 February 2013	7 June 2013
8	20	7 October 2013	1 November 2013
9	20	27 January 2014	21 February 2014
10	20	20 October 2014	14 November 2014
11	20	16 February 2015	13 March 2015
12	10	20 July 2015	31 July 2015
13	20	11 April 2016	6 May 2016
14	20	24 April 2017	19 May 2017

=== Put Your Money Where Your Mouth Is: Food ===
Series	Episodes	Originally released	
Series	Episodes	First released	Last released
1	23	5 May 2009	5 June 2009

=== Chefs: Put Your Menu Where Your Mouth Is ===
Series	Episodes	Originally released	
Series	Episodes	First released	Last released
1	15	8 April 2013	26 April 2013
