= List of I'm a Celebrity...Get Me Out of Here! (British TV series) contestants =

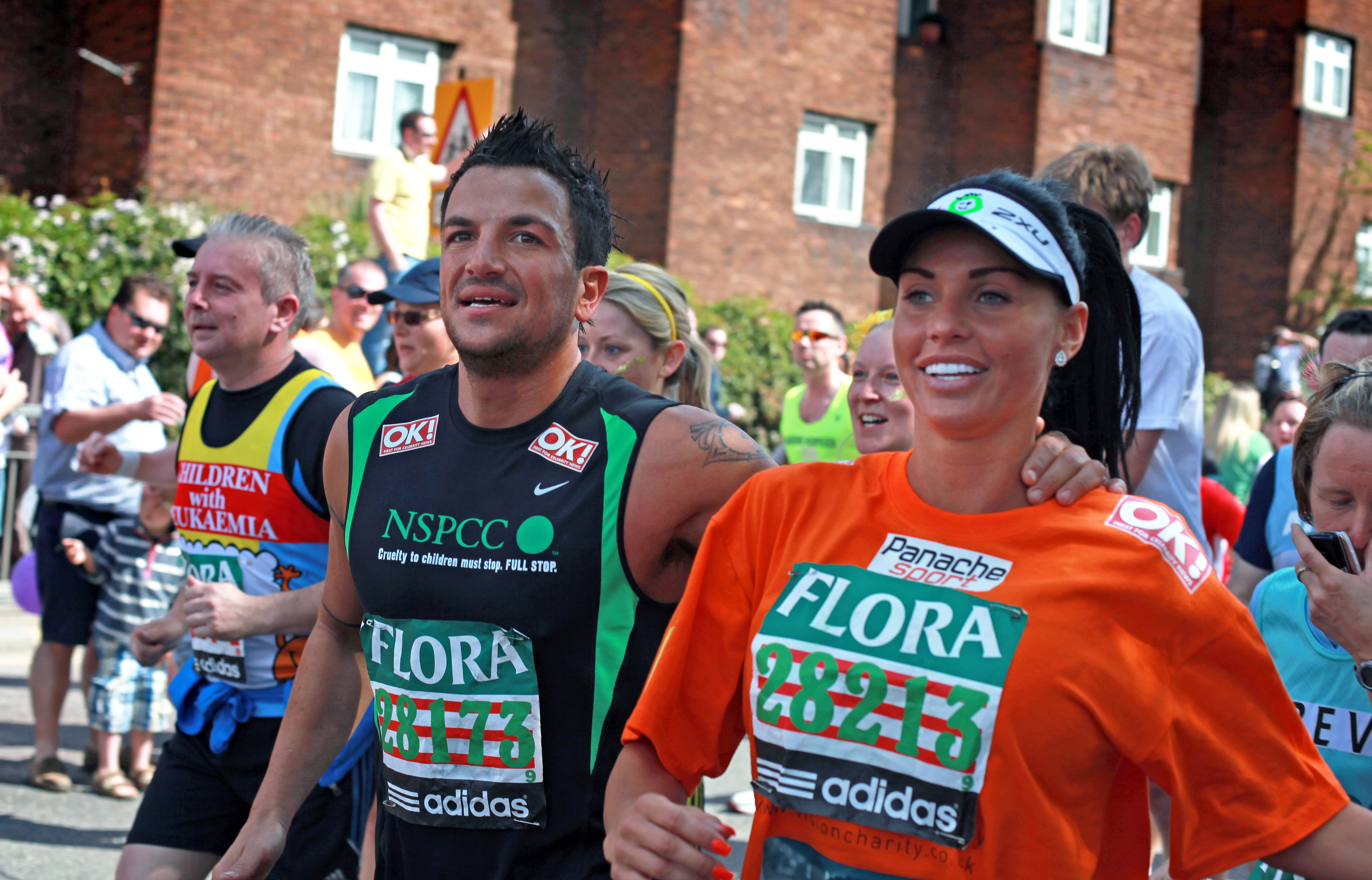
Katie Price and Peter Andre met on the show in series 3 and got married in 2005. They divorced in 2009, and Price became the first celebrity to re-enter the jungle as a contestant that same year. Andre made a guest appearance in the 2011 series.

I'm a Celebrity...Get Me Out of Here! is a British reality television show in which celebrity contestants live together in extreme conditions for a few weeks, with no luxuries or contact from the outside world. The celebrities have to complete challenges to earn food for camp; else they have to survive off of basic rations.

The first series aired in 2002, and twenty-five series have aired on ITV up to the end of the latest series in December 2025, as well as two series of the spin-off I'm a Celebrity...South Africa. During each series, contestants are progressively eliminated on the basis of public voting, with the eventual winner being crowned as "King" or "Queen" of the Jungle/Castle.

== Contestants ==
As of series 26, 304 celebrities have competed, 28 of which have entered the jungle twice. Model and TV personality Katie Price, who appeared as a contestant in the third and ninth series respectively, was the only celebrity to have competed in two separate series, until the launch of the spin-off I'm a Celebrity...South Africa in 2023, which featured the return of other former campmates. In the show's history, twenty-two celebrities have been withdrawn (due to injury, medical reasons or exceptional circumstances) or have voluntarily walked, before being voted out. Malcolm McLaren, who was due to appear on the seventh series, pulled out at the last minute so did not officially enter the jungle. In total, there have been fourteen Kings and ten Queens of the Jungle/Castle, as well as two "Jungle Legends"; Myleene Klass and Adam Thomas who won the first and second series of I'm a Celebrity... South Africa.

Key
Winner – King or Queen of the Jungle/Castle
Runner-up
Third place
Withdrew
Participating
Campmate entered for the second time

Series	Celebrity	Age	Notability	Status
1	Tony Blackburn	59	Radio DJ	1st – Winner
1	Tara Palmer-Tomkinson	30	Socialite & TV presenter	2nd – Runner-up
1	Christine Hamilton	52	Media personality	3rd – Third place
1	Nell McAndrew	28	Model & TV presenter	4th – Eliminated
1	Rhona Cameron	36	Comedian	5th – Eliminated
1	Darren Day	34	Actor & singer	6th – Eliminated
1	Nigel Benn	38	Boxer	7th – Eliminated
1	Uri Geller	55	Paranormalist	8th – Eliminated
2	Phil Tufnell	37	Cricketer	1st – Winner
2	John Fashanu	40	Footballer	2nd – Runner-up
2	Linda Barker	41	Interior designer & TV presenter	3rd – Third place
2	Wayne Sleep	54	Dancer & choreographer	4th – Eliminated
2	Antony Worrall Thompson	51	Chef & TV presenter	5th – Eliminated
2	Toyah Willcox	44	Singer & actress	6th – Eliminated
2	Catalina Guirado	29	Model & TV personality	7th – Eliminated
2	Chris Bisson	27	Actor	8th – Eliminated
2	Danniella Westbrook	29	Actress	9th – Withdrew
2	Siân Lloyd	44	TV presenter	10th – Eliminated
3	Kerry Katona	23	Singer	1st – Winner
3	Jennie Bond	53	TV presenter	2nd – Runner-up
3	Peter Andre	30	Singer	3rd – Third place
3	Lord Brocket	51	TV presenter	4th – Eliminated
3	Katie Price	25	Model	5th – Eliminated
3	Alex Best	31	Ex-wife of George Best	6th – Eliminated
3	John Lydon	47	Singer	7th – Withdrew
3	Neil Ruddock	35	Footballer	8th – Eliminated
3	Diane Modahl	37	Olympic middle-distance runner	9th – Eliminated
3	Mike Read	56	Radio DJ	10th – Eliminated
4	Joe Pasquale	43	Comedian	1st – Winner
4	Paul Burrell	46	Butler	2nd – Runner-up
4	Fran Cosgrave	26	Nightclub manager	3rd – Third place
4	Janet Street-Porter	57	Journalist	4th – Eliminated
4	Sophie Anderton	27	Model	5th – Eliminated
4	Antonio Fargas	58	Actor	6th – Eliminated
4	Sheila Ferguson	57	Singer	7th – Eliminated
4	Vic Reeves	45	Comedian & TV presenter	8th – Eliminated
4	Nancy Sorrell	30	Model & TV presenter	9th – Eliminated
4	Natalie Appleton	31	Singer	10th – Withdrew
4	Brian Harvey	30	Singer	11th – Withdrew
5	Carol Thatcher	52	Journalist & daughter of Margaret Thatcher	1st – Winner
5	Sheree Murphy	30	Actress	2nd – Runner-up
5	Sid Owen	33	Actor	3rd – Third place
5	Jimmy Osmond	42	Singer	4th – Eliminated
5	Bobby Ball	61	Comedian	5th – Eliminated
5	Antony Costa	24	Singer	6th – Eliminated
5	Jenny Frost	27	Singer	7th – Eliminated
5	David Dickinson	64	TV presenter	8th – Eliminated
5	Kimberley Davies	32	Actress	9th – Withdrew
5	Jilly Goolden	56	Critic	10th – Eliminated
5	Tommy Cannon	67	Comedian	11th – Eliminated
5	Elaine Lordan	38	Actress	12th – Withdrew
6	Matt Willis	23	Singer	1st – Winner
6	Myleene Klass	28	Singer	2nd – Runner-up
6	Jason Donovan	38	Actor & singer	3rd – Third place
6	David Gest	53	Producer	4th – Eliminated
6	Dean Gaffney	28	Actor	5th – Eliminated
6	Jan Leeming	64	TV presenter	6th – Eliminated
6	Malandra Burrows	41	Actress	7th – Eliminated
6	Phina Oruche	34	Actress	8th – Eliminated
6	Lauren Booth	39	Journalist & activist	9th – Eliminated
6	Faith Brown	62	Comedian	10th – Eliminated
6	Scott Henshall	30	Fashion designer	11th – Eliminated
6	Toby Anstis	35	TV & radio presenter	12th – Eliminated
7	Christopher Biggins	58	Actor	1st – Winner
7	Janice Dickinson	52	Model	2nd – Runner-up
7	J Brown	31	Singer & rapper	3rd – Third place
7	Cerys Matthews	38	Singer	4th – Eliminated
7	Gemma Atkinson	22	Model & actress	5th – Eliminated
7	Anna Ryder Richardson	43	Interior designer & TV presenter	6th – Eliminated
7	Rodney Marsh	63	Footballer	7th – Eliminated
7	John Burton-Race	50	Chef	8th – Eliminated
7	Lynne Franks	59	Media personality	9th – Eliminated
7	Katie Hopkins	32	Reality TV star	10th – Eliminated
7	Marc Bannerman	34	Actor	11th – Eliminated
8	Joe Swash	26	Actor	1st – Winner
8	Martina Navratilova	52	Tennis player	2nd – Runner-up
8	George Takei	71	Actor	3rd – Third place
8	David Van Day	51	Singer	4th – Eliminated
8	Simon Webbe	30	Singer	5th – Eliminated
8	Nicola McLean	27	Model	6th – Eliminated
8	Brian Paddick	50	Senior policeman & politician	7th – Eliminated
8	Esther Rantzen	68	TV presenter	8th – Eliminated
8	Timmy Mallett	53	TV presenter	9th – Eliminated
8	Carly Zucker	24	Fitness trainer & fiancé of Joe Cole	10th – Eliminated
8	Dani Behr	34	TV presenter	11th – Eliminated
8	Robert Kilroy-Silk	66	Politician & TV presenter	12th – Eliminated
9	Gino D'Acampo	33	Chef & TV presenter	1st – Winner
9	Kim Woodburn	67	TV presenter	2nd – Runner-up
9	Jimmy White	47	Snooker player	3rd – Third place
9	Justin Ryan	42	Interior designer & TV presenter	4th – Eliminated
9	Stuart Manning	30	Actor	5th – Eliminated
9	Sabrina Washington	31	Singer	6th – Eliminated
9	George Hamilton	70	Actor	7th – Withdrew
9	Joe Bugner	59	Boxer	8th – Eliminated
9	Samantha Fox	43	Model & singer	9th – Eliminated
9	Colin McAllister	41	Interior designer & TV presenter	10th – Eliminated
9	Lucy Benjamin	39	Actress	11th – Eliminated
9	Katie Price	31	Model & businesswoman	12th – Withdrew
9	Camilla Dallerup	35	Professional dancer	13th – Withdrew
10	Stacey Solomon	21	Singer	1st – Winner
10	Shaun Ryder	48	Singer	2nd – Runner-up
10	Jenny Eclair	50	Comedian	3rd – Third place
10	Dom Joly	42	Comedian	4th – Eliminated
10	Kayla Collins	23	Model	5th – Eliminated
10	Aggro Santos	21	Rapper	6th – Eliminated
10	Linford Christie	50	Olympic sprinter	7th – Eliminated
10	Gillian McKeith	51	Nutritionist & TV presenter	8th – Eliminated
10	Britt Ekland	68	Actress	9th – Eliminated
10	Alison Hammond	35	TV presenter	10th – Eliminated
10	Lembit Öpik	45	Politician	11th – Eliminated
10	Sheryl Gascoigne	47	Ex-wife of Paul Gascoigne	12th – Eliminated
10	Nigel Havers	59	Actor	13th – Withdrew
11	Dougie Poynter	23	Musician	1st – Winner
11	Mark Wright	24	Reality TV star	2nd – Runner-up
11	Fatima Whitbread	50	Olympic javelin thrower	3rd – Third place
11	Antony Cotton	36	Actor	4th – Eliminated
11	Willie Carson	68	Jockey	5th – Eliminated
11	Crissy Rock	53	Actress	6th – Eliminated
11	Emily Scott	28	Model	7th – Eliminated
11	Jessica-Jane Clement	26	Model & TV presenter	8th – Eliminated
11	Lorraine Chase	60	Actress	9th – Eliminated
11	Pat Sharp	50	TV & radio presenter	10th – Eliminated
11	Sinitta	48	Singer	11th – Eliminated
11	Stefanie Powers	69	Actress	12th – Eliminated
11	Freddie Starr	68	Comedian	13th – Withdrew
12	Charlie Brooks	31	Actress	1st – Winner
12	Ashley Roberts	31	Singer	2nd – Runner-up
12	David Haye	32	Boxer	3rd – Third place
12	Eric Bristow	55	Darts player	4th – Eliminated
12	Hugo Taylor	26	Reality TV star	5th – Eliminated
12	Rosemary Shrager	61	Chef	6th – Eliminated
12	Helen Flanagan	22	Actress	7th – Eliminated
12	Colin Baker	69	Actor	8th – Eliminated
12	Linda Robson	54	Actress	9th – Eliminated
12	Limahl	53	Singer	10th – Eliminated
12	Nadine Dorries	55	Politician	11th – Eliminated
12	Brian Conley	51	Comedian	12th – Withdrew
13	Kian Egan	33	Singer	1st – Winner
13	David Emanuel	61	Fashion designer	2nd – Runner-up
13	Lucy Pargeter	36	Actress	3rd – Third place
13	Joey Essex	23	Reality TV star	4th – Eliminated
13	Amy Willerton	21	Model	5th – Eliminated
13	Rebecca Adlington	24	Olympic swimmer	6th – Eliminated
13	Alfonso Ribeiro	42	Actor	7th – Eliminated
13	Steve Davis	56	Snooker player	8th – Eliminated
13	Matthew Wright	48	TV presenter	9th – Eliminated
13	Vincent Simone	34	Professional dancer	10th – Eliminated
13	Laila Morse	68	Actress	11th – Eliminated
13	Annabel Giles	54	TV presenter	12th – Eliminated
14	Carl Fogarty	49	Superbike racer	1st – Winner
14	Jake Quickenden	26	Singer	2nd – Runner-up
14	Melanie Sykes	44	TV presenter	3rd – Third place
14	Edwina Currie	68	Politician	4th – Eliminated
14	Tinchy Stryder	28	Rapper	5th – Eliminated
14	Kendra Wilkinson	29	Model & TV personality	6th – Eliminated
14	Vicki Michelle	63	Actress	7th – Eliminated
14	Michael Buerk	68	TV presenter	8th – Eliminated
14	Nadia Forde	25	Model & singer	9th – Eliminated
14	Jimmy Bullard	36	Footballer	10th – Eliminated
14	Craig Charles	50	Actor	11th – Withdrew
14	Gemma Collins	33	Reality TV star	12th – Withdrew
15	Vicky Pattison	28	Reality TV star	1st – Winner
15	George Shelley	22	Singer	2nd – Runner-up
15	Ferne McCann	25	Reality TV star	3rd – Third place
15	Kieron Dyer	36	Footballer	4th – Eliminated
15	Jorgie Porter	27	Actress	5th – Eliminated
15	Tony Hadley	55	Singer	6th – Eliminated
15	Duncan Bannatyne	66	Entrepreneur	7th – Eliminated
15	Lady Colin Campbell	66	Socialite & author	8th – Withdrew
15	Chris Eubank	49	Boxer	9th – Eliminated
15	Yvette Fielding	47	TV presenter	10th – Eliminated
15	Brian Friedman	38	Choreographer	11th – Eliminated
15	Susannah Constantine	53	TV presenter	12th – Eliminated
15	Spencer Matthews	26	Reality TV star	13th – Withdrew
16	Scarlett Moffatt	26	Reality TV star	1st – Winner
16	Joel Dommett	31	Comedian	2nd – Runner-up
16	Adam Thomas	28	Actor	3rd – Third place
16	Sam Quek	28	Olympic field hockey player	4th – Eliminated
16	Wayne Bridge	36	Footballer	5th – Eliminated
16	Martin Roberts	53	TV presenter	6th – Eliminated
16	Larry Lamb	69	Actor	7th – Eliminated
16	Carol Vorderman	55	TV presenter	8th – Eliminated
16	Jordan Banjo	23	Dancer	9th – Eliminated
16	Ola Jordan	34	Professional dancer	10th – Eliminated
16	Lisa Snowdon	44	TV & radio presenter	11th – Eliminated
16	Danny Baker	59	TV & radio presenter	12th – Eliminated
17	Georgia Toffolo	23	Reality TV star	1st – Winner
17	Jamie Lomas	42	Actor	2nd – Runner-up
17	Iain Lee	44	TV & radio presenter	3rd – Third place
17	Jennie McAlpine	33	Actress	4th – Eliminated
17	Amir Khan	30	Boxer	5th – Eliminated
17	Dennis Wise	50	Footballer	6th – Eliminated
17	Stanley Johnson	77	Politician & author	7th – Eliminated
17	Vanessa White	28	Singer	8th – Eliminated
17	Rebekah Vardy	35	Wife of Jamie Vardy	9th – Eliminated
17	Kezia Dugdale	36	Politician	10th – Eliminated
17	Shappi Khorsandi	44	Comedian	11th – Eliminated
17	Jack Maynard	22	YouTuber and brother of Conor Maynard	12th – Withdrew
18	Harry Redknapp	71	Football manager	1st – Winner
18	Emily Atack	28	Actress	2nd – Runner-up
18	John Barrowman	51	Actor	3rd – Third place
18	Fleur East	31	Singer	4th – Eliminated
18	James McVey	25	Musician	5th – Eliminated
18	Nick Knowles	56	TV presenter	6th – Eliminated
18	Anne Hegerty	60	TV personality	7th – Eliminated
18	Rita Simons	41	Actress	8th – Eliminated
18	Sair Khan	30	Actress	9th – Eliminated
18	Malique Thompson-Dwyer	20	Actor	10th – Eliminated
18	Noel Edmonds	69	TV & radio presenter	11th – Eliminated
19	Jacqueline Jossa	27	Actress	1st – Winner
19	Andy Whyment	38	Actor	2nd – Runner-up
19	Roman Kemp	26	Radio DJ	3rd – Third place
19	Kate Garraway	52	TV & radio presenter	4th – Eliminated
19	Nadine Coyle	34	Singer	5th – Eliminated
19	Caitlyn Jenner	70	Olympic decathlete & TV personality	6th – Eliminated
19	Myles Stephenson	28	Singer	7th – Eliminated
19	Ian Wright	56	Footballer	8th – Eliminated
19	James Haskell	34	Rugby player	9th – Eliminated
19	Cliff Parisi	59	Actor	10th – Eliminated
19	Andrew Maxwell	44	Comedian	11th – Eliminated
19	Adele Roberts	40	Radio DJ	12th – Eliminated
20	Giovanna Fletcher	35	Author & presenter	1st – Winner
20	Jordan North	30	Radio DJ	2nd – Runner-up
20	Vernon Kay	46	TV & radio presenter	3rd – Third place
20	Shane Richie	56	Actor	4th – Eliminated
20	Mo Farah	37	Olympic long-distance runner	5th – Eliminated
20	AJ Pritchard	26	Professional dancer	6th – Eliminated
20	Jessica Plummer	28	Actress & singer	7th – Eliminated
20	Russell Watson	54	Singer	8th – Eliminated
20	Beverley Callard	63	Actress	9th – Eliminated
20	Victoria Derbyshire	52	Journalist & TV presenter	10th – Eliminated
20	Ruthie Henshall	53	Actress & singer	11th – Eliminated
20	Hollie Arnold	26	Paralympic javelin thrower	12th – Eliminated
21	Danny Miller	30	Actor	1st – Winner
21	Simon Gregson	47	Actor	2nd – Runner-up
21	Frankie Bridge	32	Singer	3rd – Third place
21	David Ginola	54	Footballer	4th – Eliminated
21	Matty Lee	23	Olympic diver	5th – Eliminated
21	Adam Woodyatt	53	Actor	6th – Eliminated
21	Louise Minchin	53	TV presenter	7th – Eliminated
21	Naughty Boy	40	DJ & record producer	8th – Eliminated
21	Snoochie Shy	29	Radio DJ	9th – Eliminated
21	Kadeena Cox	30	Paralympic athlete & cyclist	10th – Eliminated
21	Arlene Phillips	78	Choreographer & TV judge	11th – Eliminated
21	Richard Madeley	65	TV presenter	12th – Withdrew
22	Jill Scott	35	Footballer	1st – Winner
22	Owen Warner	23	Actor	2nd – Runner-up
22	Matt Hancock	44	Politician	3rd – Third place
22	Mike Tindall	44	Rugby Player	4th – Eliminated
22	Seann Walsh	36	Comedian	5th – Eliminated
22	Chris Moyles	48	Radio & TV presenter	6th – Eliminated
22	Babatúndé Aléshé	36	Actor & comedian	7th – Eliminated
22	Boy George	61	Singer	8th – Eliminated
22	Sue Cleaver	59	Actress	9th – Eliminated
22	Scarlette Douglas	35	TV presenter	10th – Eliminated
22	Charlene White	42	TV presenter	11th – Eliminated
22	Olivia Attwood	31	Model & TV personality	12th – Withdrew
23	Sam Thompson	31	TV personality	1st – Winner
23	Tony Bellew	41	Boxer	2nd – Runner-up
23	Nigel Farage	59	Politician	3rd – Third place
23	Josie Gibson	38	TV presenter	4th – Eliminated
23	Marvin Humes	38	Singer & presenter	5th – Eliminated
23	Danielle Harold	31	Actress	6th – Eliminated
23	Nick Pickard	48	Actor	7th – Eliminated
23	Fred Sirieix	51	Maître d'hôtel	8th – Eliminated
23	Nella Rose	26	YouTuber & influencer	9th – Eliminated
23	Frankie Dettori	52	Jockey	10th – Eliminated
23	Jamie Lynn Spears	32	Actress & singer	11th – Withdrew
23	Grace Dent	50	Columnist & restaurant critic	12th – Withdrew
24	Danny Jones	38	Singer	1st – Winner
24	Coleen Rooney	38	Media personality	2nd – Runner-up
24	Rev. Richard Coles	62	Broadcaster, musician & priest	3rd – Third place
24	Oti Mabuse	34	Dancer & TV judge	4th – Eliminated
24	GK Barry	25	Social media personality	5th – Eliminated
24	Alan Halsall	42	Actor	6th – Eliminated
24	Maura Higgins	34	TV personality & model	7th – Eliminated
24	Barry McGuigan	63	Boxer & promoter	8th – Eliminated
24	Melvin Odoom	44	TV & radio presenter	9th – Eliminated
24	Tulisa	36	Singer	10th – Eliminated
24	Dean McCullough	32	Radio presenter	11th – Eliminated
24	Jane Moore	62	Journalist & TV presenter	12th – Eliminated
25	Angryginge	24	Social media personality	1st – Winner
25	Tom Read Wilson	39	TV personality	2nd – Runner-up
25	Shona McGarty	34	Actress	3rd – Third place
25	Aitch	25	Rapper	4th – Eliminated
25	Lisa Riley	49	Actress	5th – Eliminated
25	Jack Osbourne	40	Media personality	6th – Eliminated
25	Martin Kemp	64	Musician & actor	7th – Eliminated
25	Ruby Wax	72	Comedian, actress & TV presenter	8th – Eliminated
25	Kelly Brook	46	Model, actress & presenter	9th – Eliminated
25	Vogue Williams	40	Media personality & presenter	10th – Eliminated
25	Eddie Kadi	42	Comedian & radio presenter	11th – Eliminated
25	Alex Scott	41	Footballer & TV presenter	12th – Eliminated
26	Ade Adepitan	53	Paralympian & TV presenter	Participating
26	AJ Odudu	38	TV presenter	Participating
26	Chloe Burrows	31	Media personality	Participating
26	Claire Sweeney	55	Actress, singer & TV presenter	Participating
26	Jack Skipper	38	Comedian & social media personality	Participating
26	Joanna Page	49	Actress & TV presenter	Participating
26	Leigh Francis	53	Comedian & TV presenter	Participating
26	Leomie Anderson	33	Model & TV presenter	Participating
26	Mariella Frostrup	64	Journalist & TV presenter	Participating
26	Ricky Wilson	48	Singer	Participating
26	Sharky	30	Social media personality	Participating
26	Wayne Rooney	41	Footballer	Participating

== I'm a Celebrity... South Africa ==
The following is a list of contestants that have appeared on the spin-off series I'm a Celebrity... South Africa. 27 contestants have re-entered the jungle.

Series	Celebrity	Age	Notability	Status
1	Myleene Klass	44	Singer & presenter	1st – Winner
1	Jordan Banjo	29	Dancer & radio presenter	2nd – Runner-up
1	Fatima Whitbread	61	Olympic javelin thrower	3rd – Third place
1	Phil Tufnell	56	Cricketer	4th – Eliminated
1	Carol Vorderman	61	TV presenter	5th/6th – Eliminated
1	Paul Burrell	64	Butler & author	5th/6th – Eliminated
1	Dean Gaffney	44	Actor	7th/8th – Eliminated
1	Helen Flanagan	32	Actress	7th/8th – Eliminated
1	Joe Swash	40	Actor & TV presenter	9th – Eliminated
1	Janice Dickinson	67	Model	10th – Withdrew
1	Andy Whyment	41	Actor	11th/12th – Eliminated
1	Georgia Toffolo	27	Reality TV star	11th/12th – Eliminated
1	Amir Khan	35	Boxer	13th – Eliminated
1	Gillian McKeith	63	Nutritionist & TV presenter	14th/15th – Eliminated
1	Shaun Ryder	60	Singer	14th/15th – Eliminated
2	Adam Thomas	37	Actor	1st – Winner
2	Mo Farah	42	Olympic long-distance runner	2nd – Runner-up
2	Harry Redknapp	78	Former football manager	3rd – Third place
2	Craig Charles	61	Actor & presenter	4th – Eliminated
2	Scarlett Moffatt	34	Television personality & presenter	5th – Eliminated
2	Sinitta	61	Singer & TV personality	6th – Eliminated
2	Ashley Roberts	43	Singer	7th – Eliminated
2	Jimmy Bullard	47	Former footballer	8th – Eliminated
2	Beverley Callard	68	Actress	9th – Withdrew
2	Gemma Collins	44	Media personality & businesswoman	10th – Eliminated
2	David Haye	44	Boxer	11th – Eliminated
2	Seann Walsh	39	Comedian	12th – Eliminated

== International versions ==
Name	I'm a Celebrity... UK history		I'm a Celebrity... International franchise history			
Name	Series	Status	Country	Series	Season(s)	Status
Janice Dickinson	Series 7 (2007)	Runner-up – 2nd place	United States	I'm a Celebrity (America)	Season 2 (2009)	Evicted – 8th place
Paul Burrell	Series 4 (2004)	Runner-up – 2nd place	Australia	I'm a Celebrity (Australia)	Season 4 (2018)	Evicted – 9th place
Vicky Pattison	Series 15 (2015)	Winner – 1st place	Australia	I'm a Celebrity (Australia)	Season 4 (2018)	Evicted – 4th place
Caitlyn Jenner	Series 19 (2019)	Eliminated – 6th place	United States	I'm a Celebrity (America)	Season 1 (2003)	Evicted – 4th place
Joey Essex	Series 13 (2013)	Evicted – 4th place	Australia	I'm a Celebrity (Australia)	Season 8 (2022)	Evicted – 6th place

== Gallery of winners ==
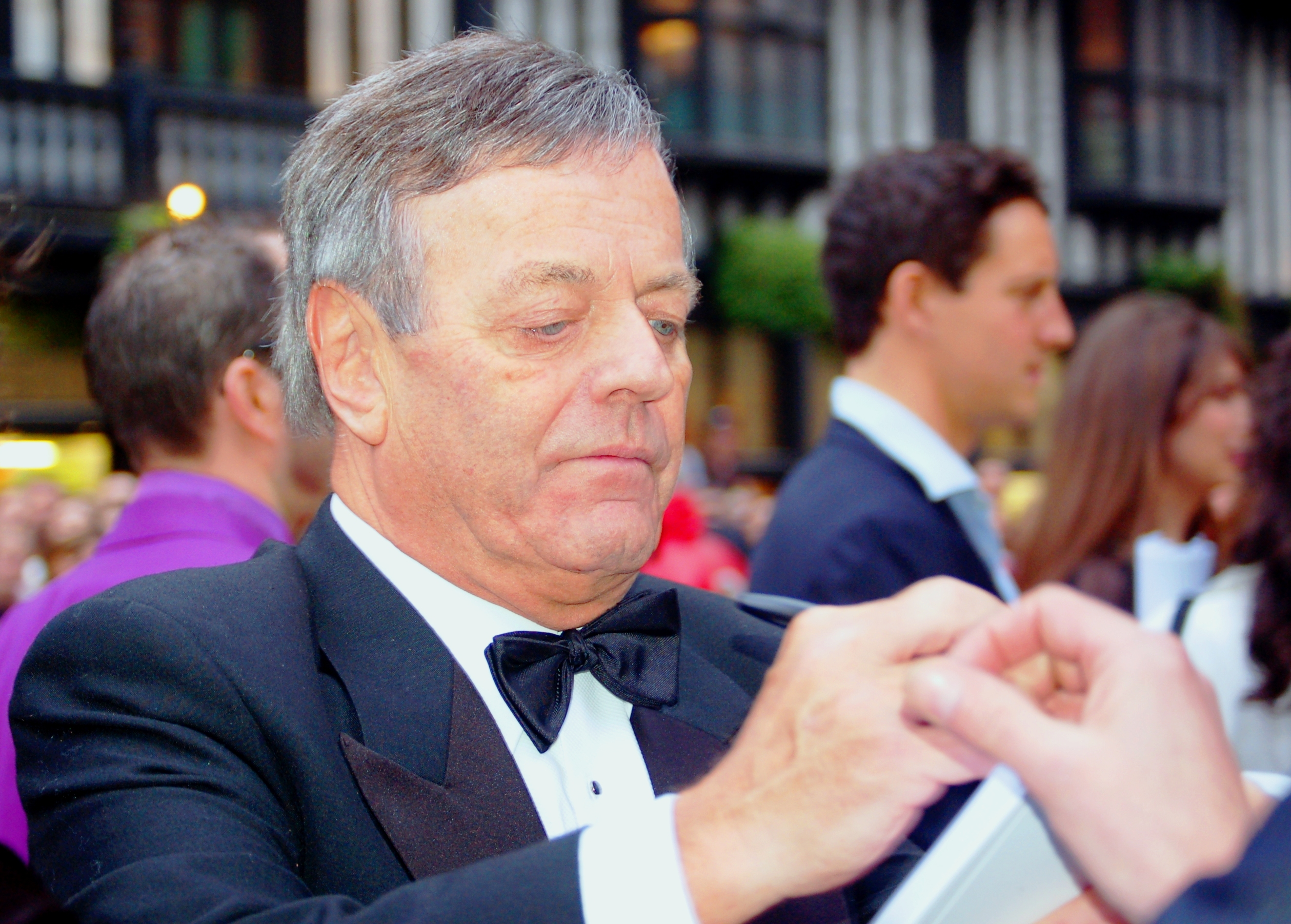
Tony Blackburn, winner of series 1 (2002)

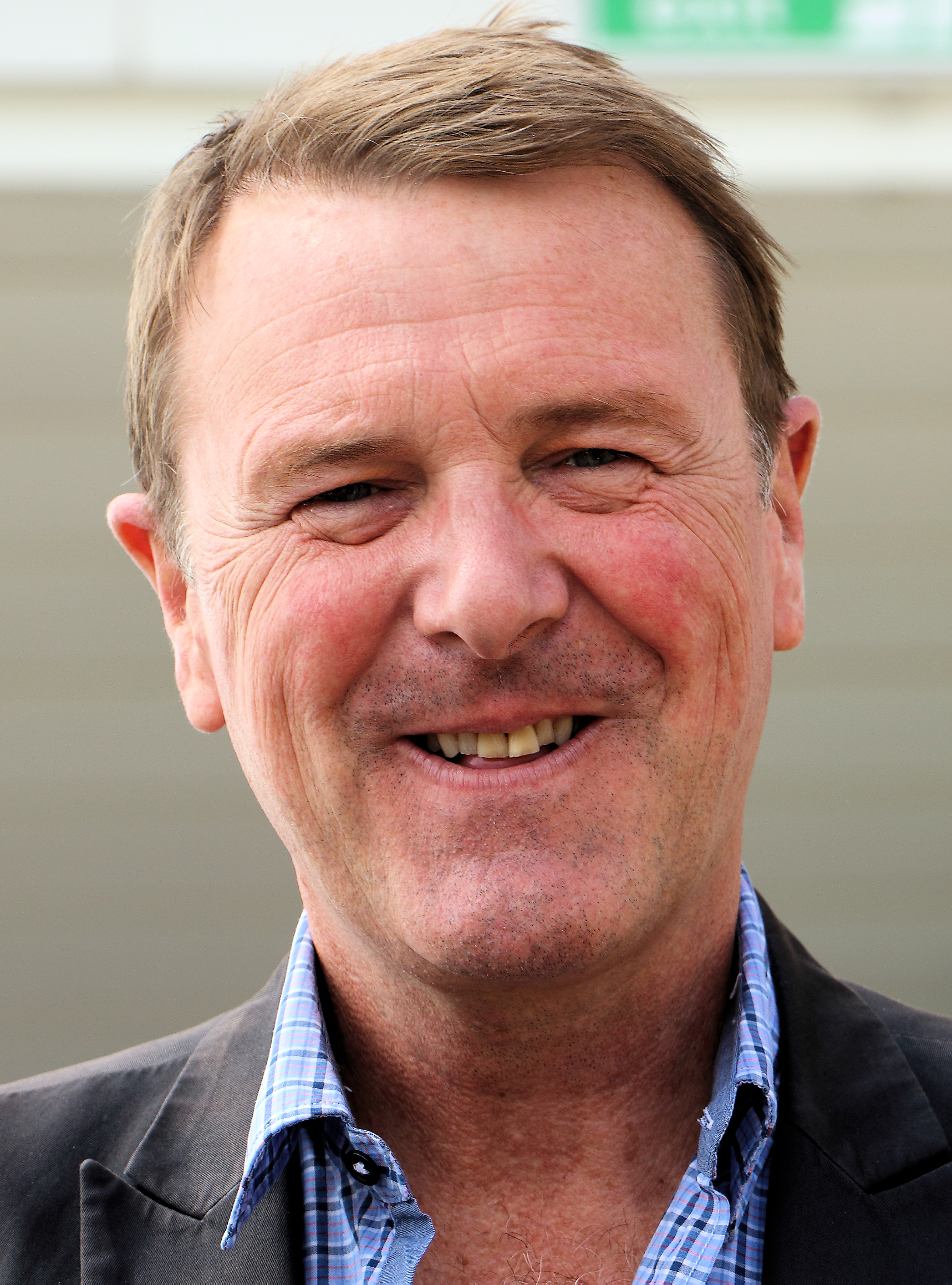
Phil Tufnell, winner of series 2 (2003)

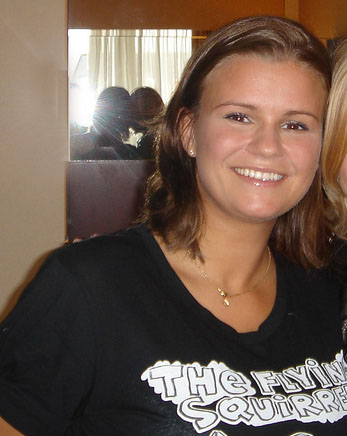
Kerry Katona, winner of series 3 (early 2004)

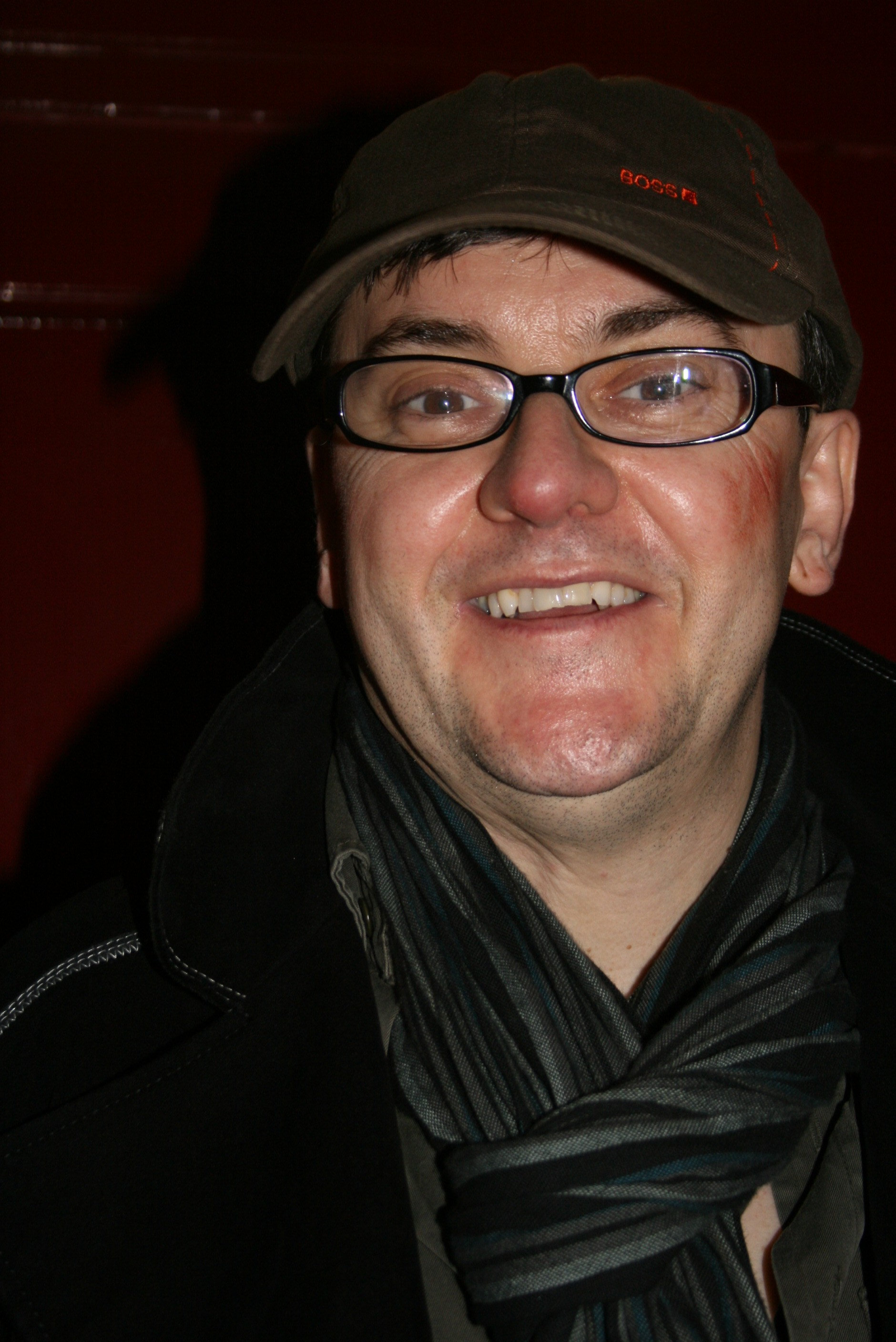
Joe Pasquale, winner of series 4 (late 2004)

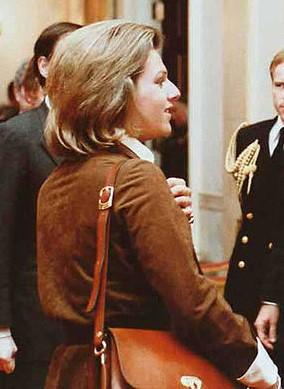
Carol Thatcher, winner of series 5 (2005)

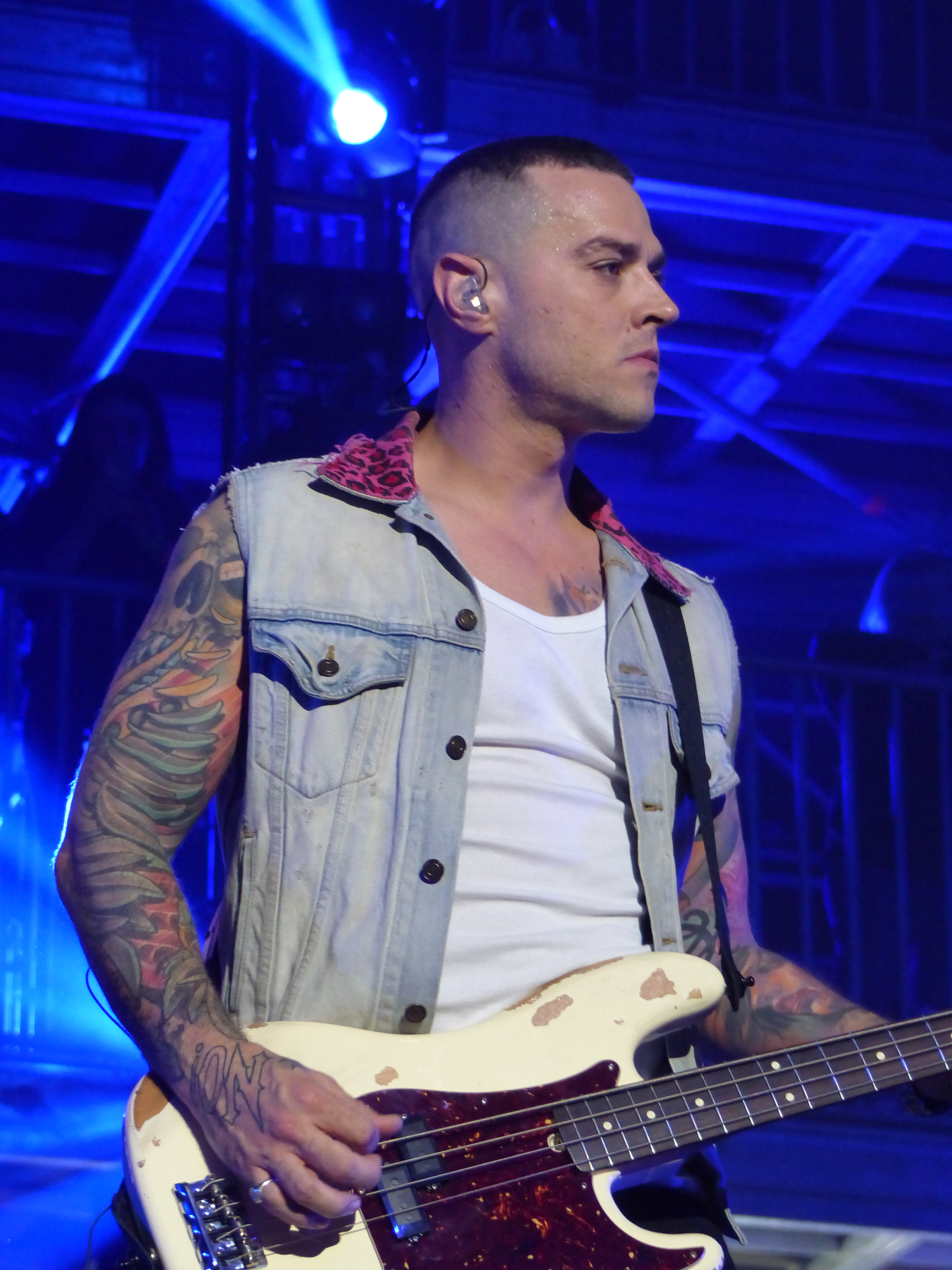
Matt Willis, winner of series 6 (2006)

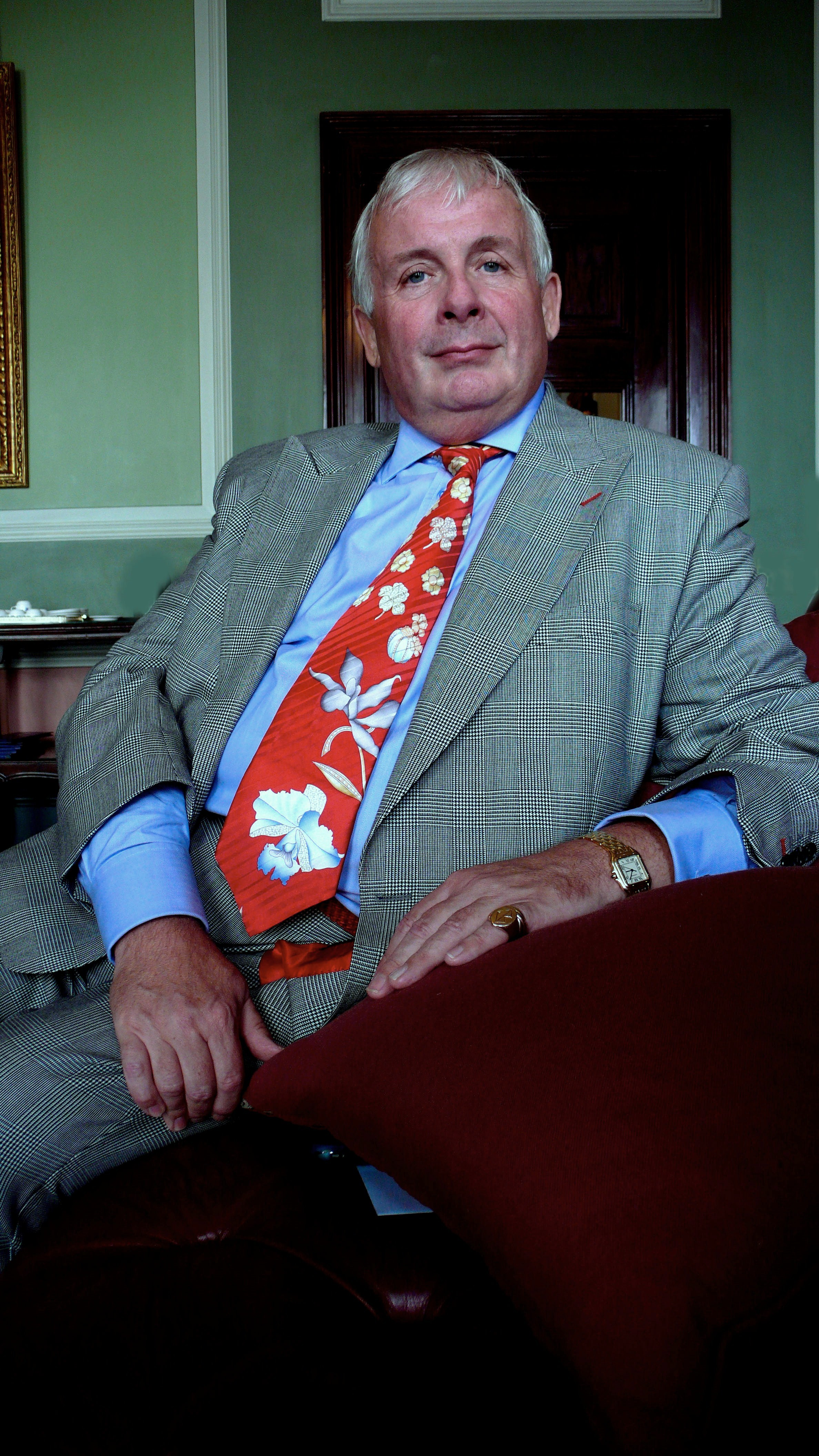
Christopher Biggins, winner of series 7 (2007)

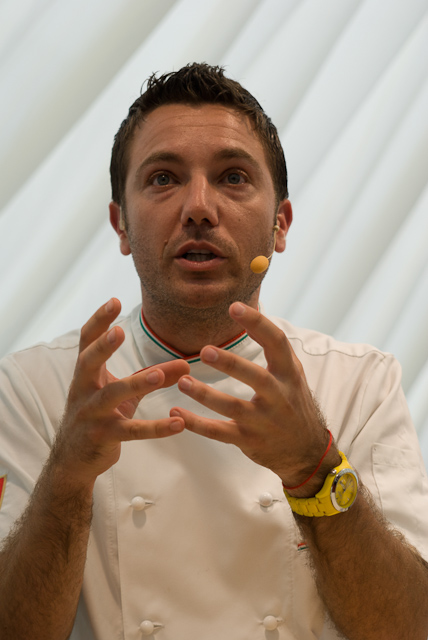
Gino D'Acampo, winner of series 9 (2009)

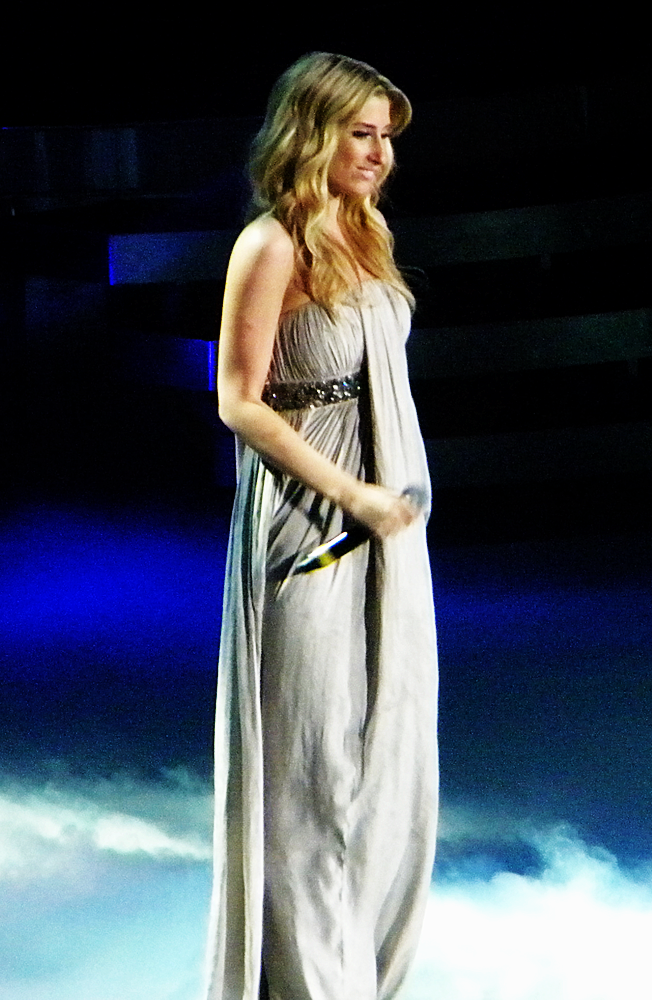
Stacey Solomon, winner of series 10 (2010)

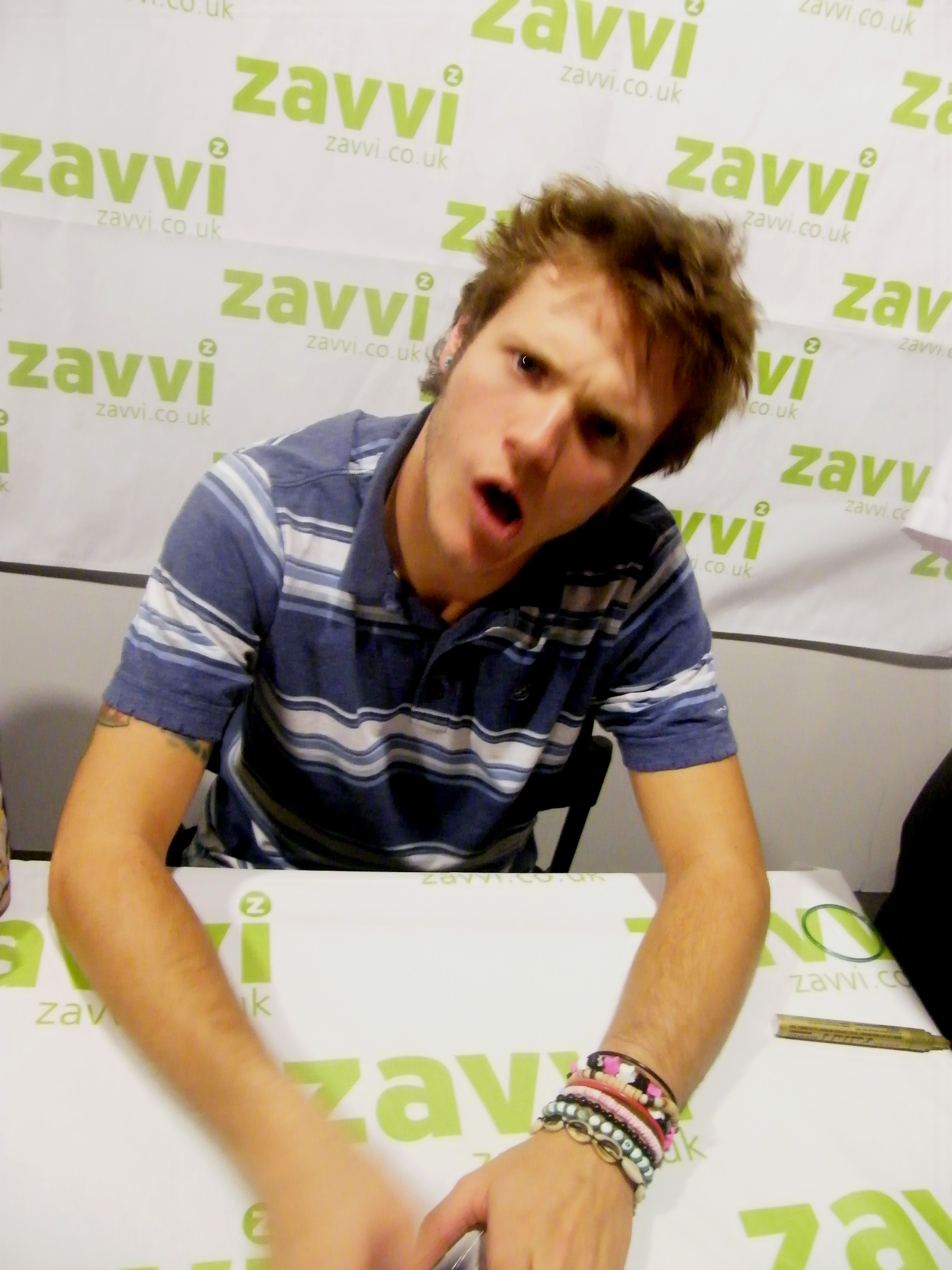
Dougie Poynter, winner of series 11 (2011)

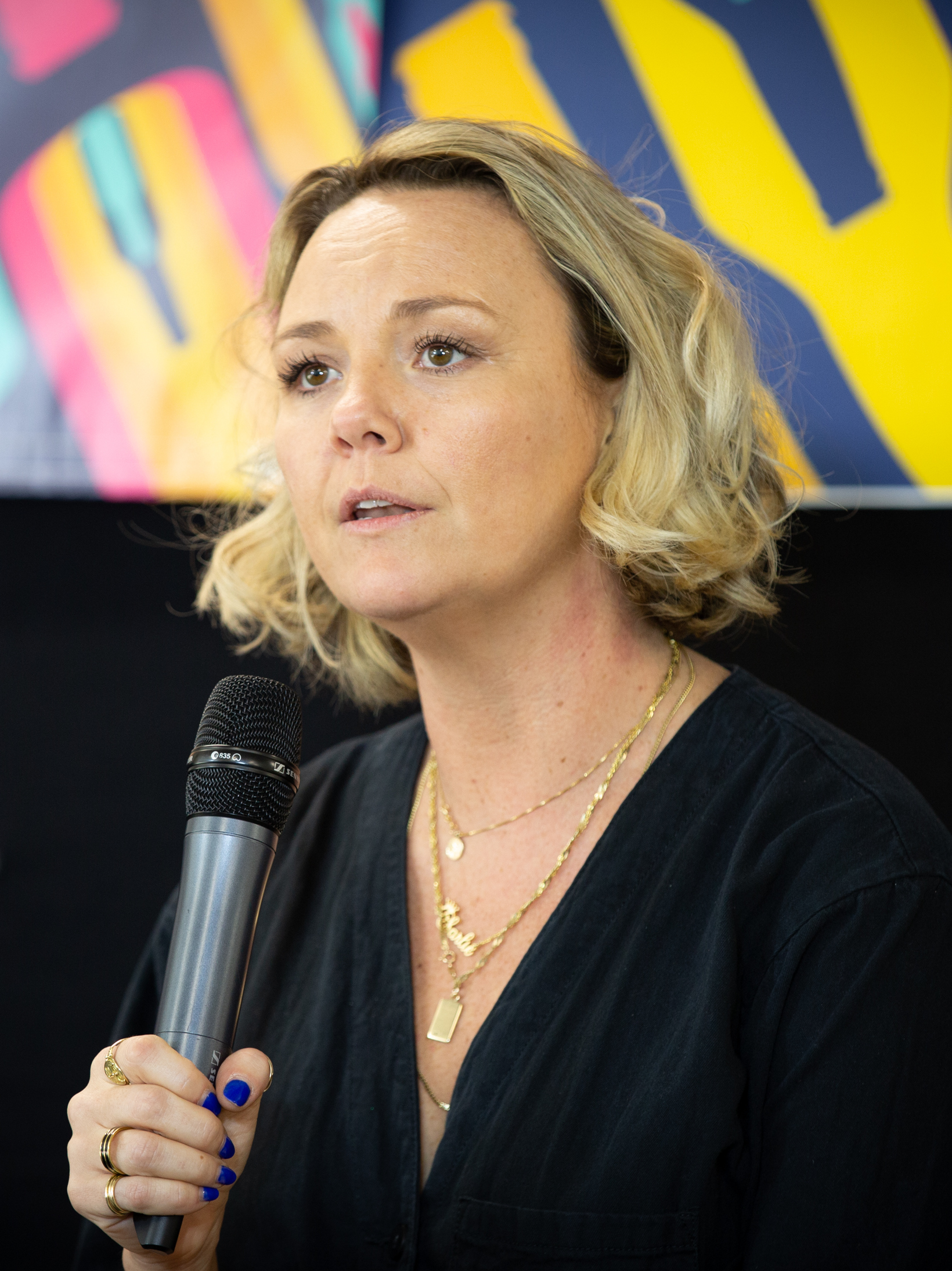
Charlie Brooks, winner of series 12 (2012)

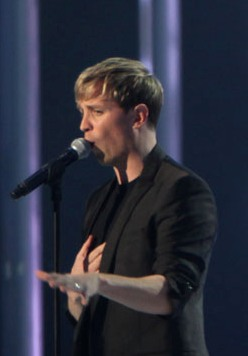
Kian Egan, winner of series 13 (2013)

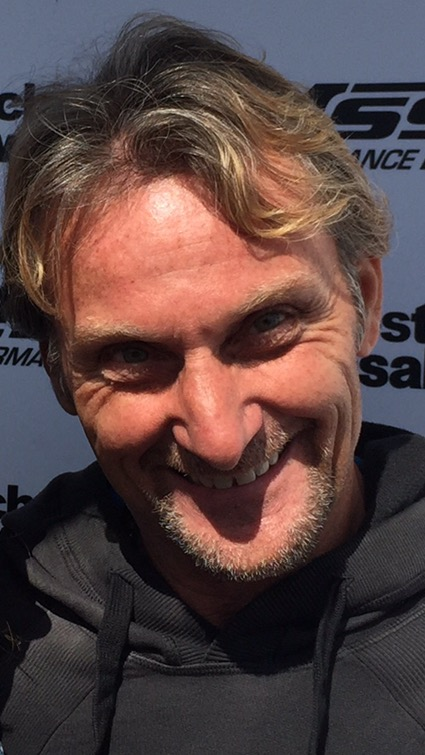
Carl Fogarty, winner of series 14 (2014)

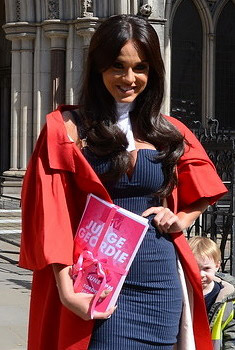
Vicky Pattison, winner of series 15 (2015)

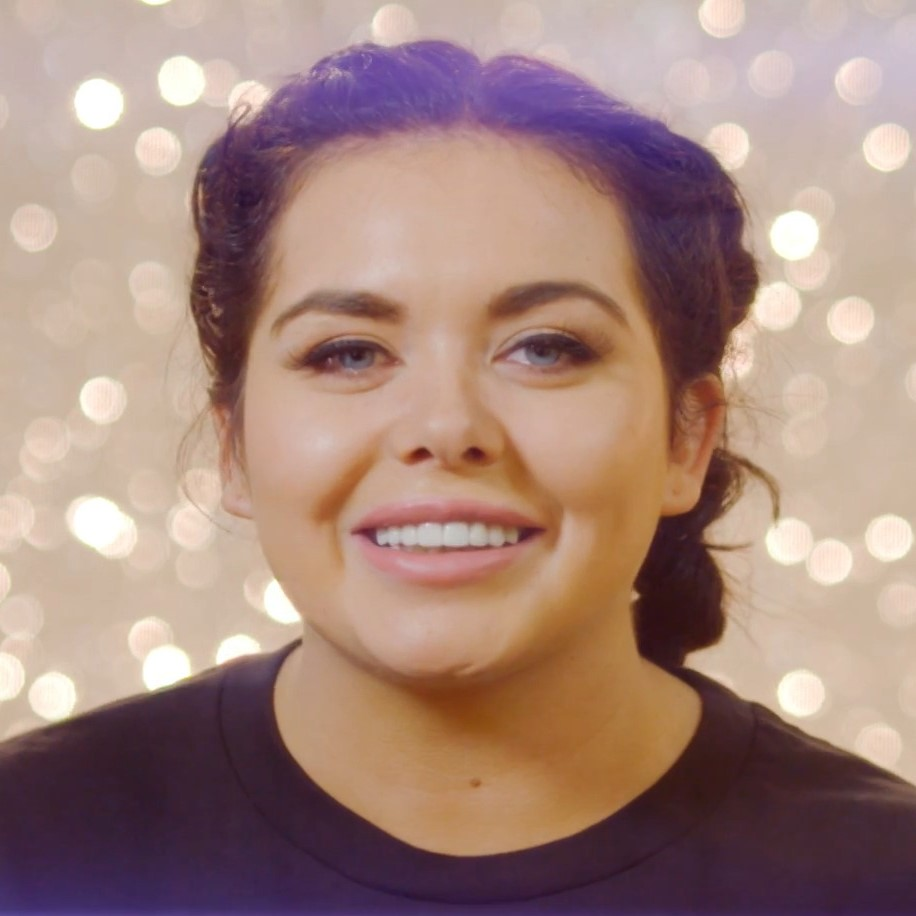
Scarlett Moffatt, winner of series 16 (2016)

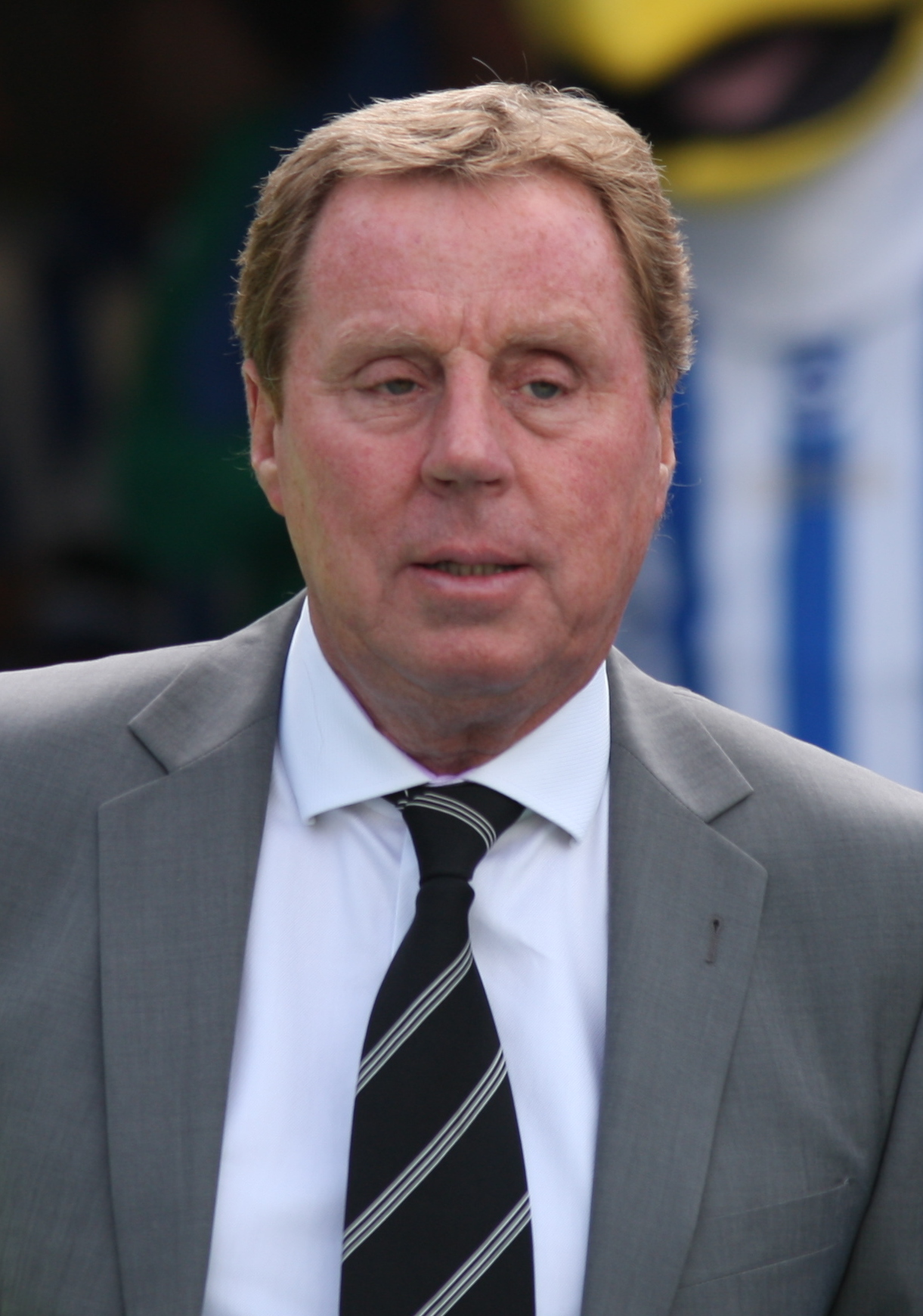
Harry Redknapp, winner of series 18 (2018)

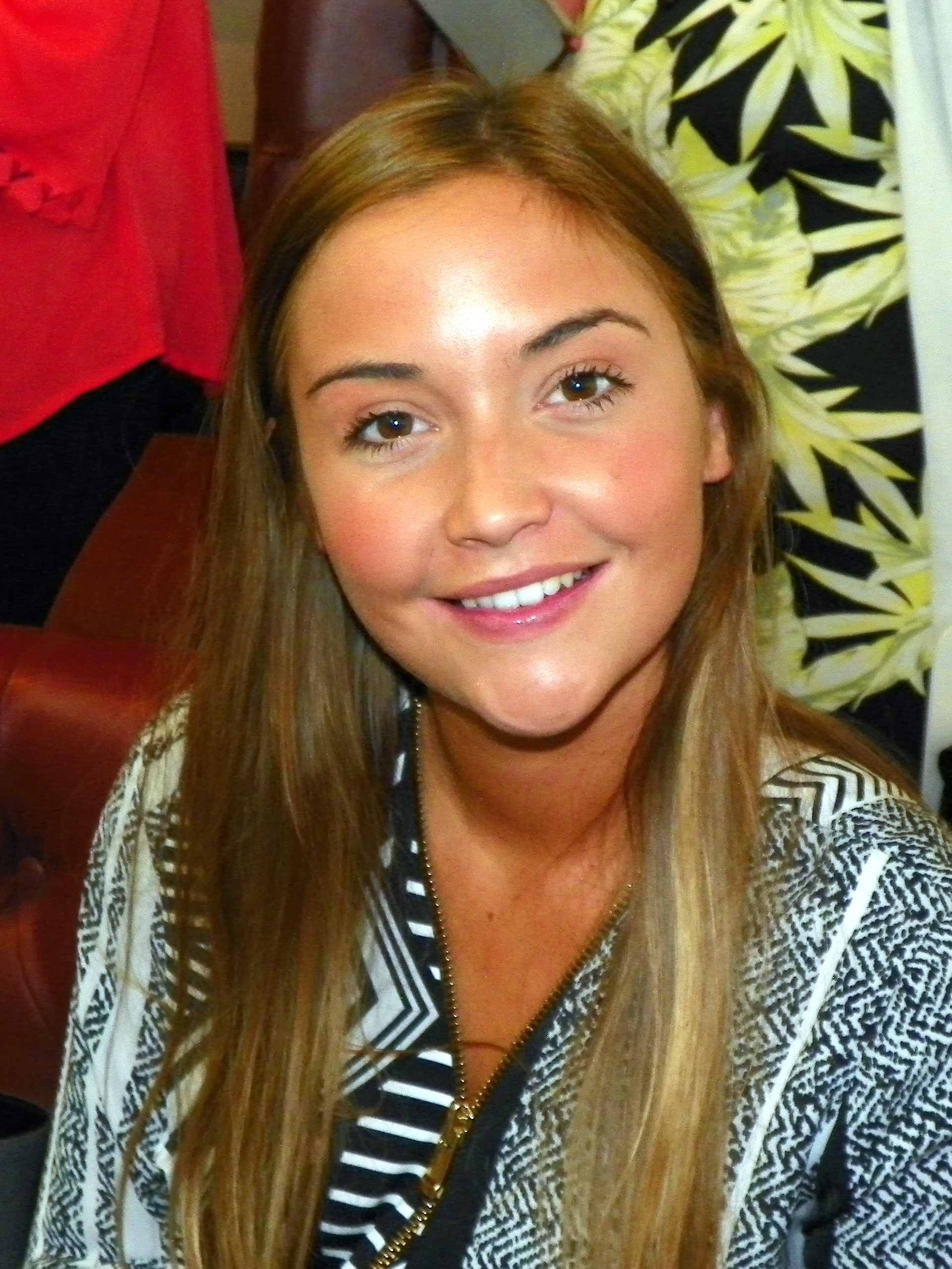
Jacqueline Jossa, winner of series 19 (2019)

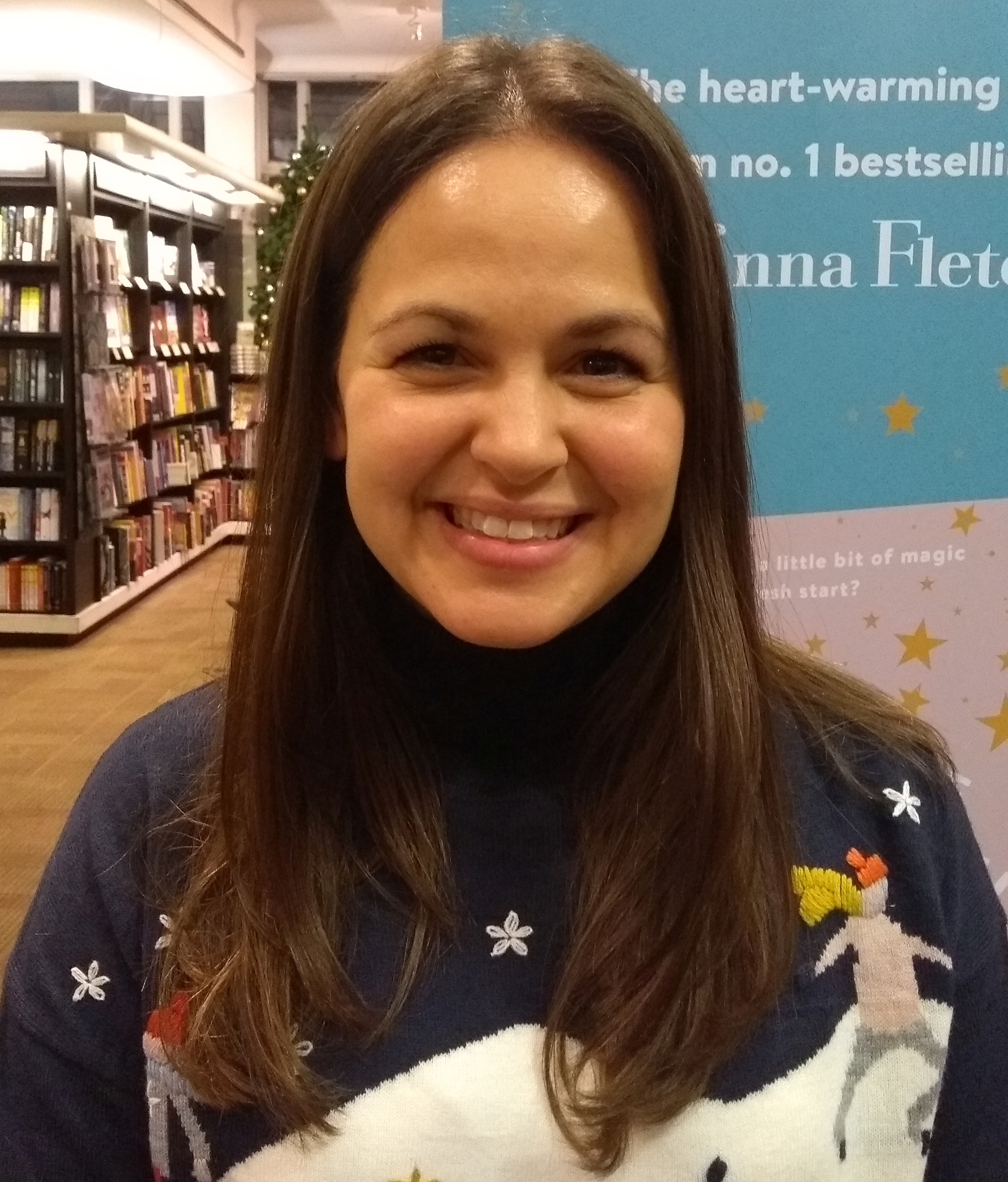
Giovanna Fletcher, winner of series 20 (2020)

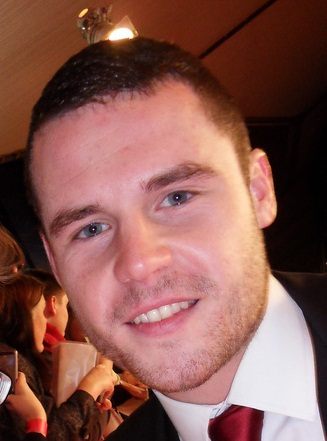
Danny Miller, winner of series 21 (2021)

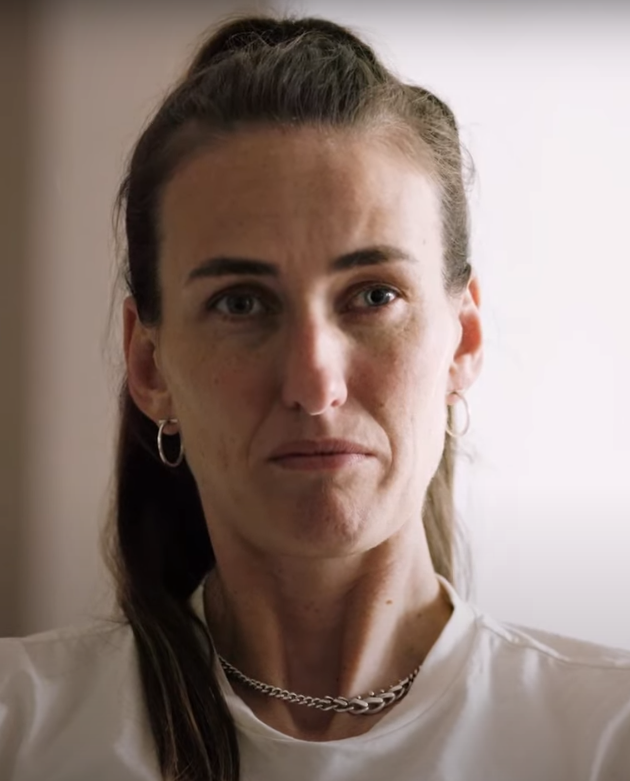
Jill Scott, winner of series 22 (2022)

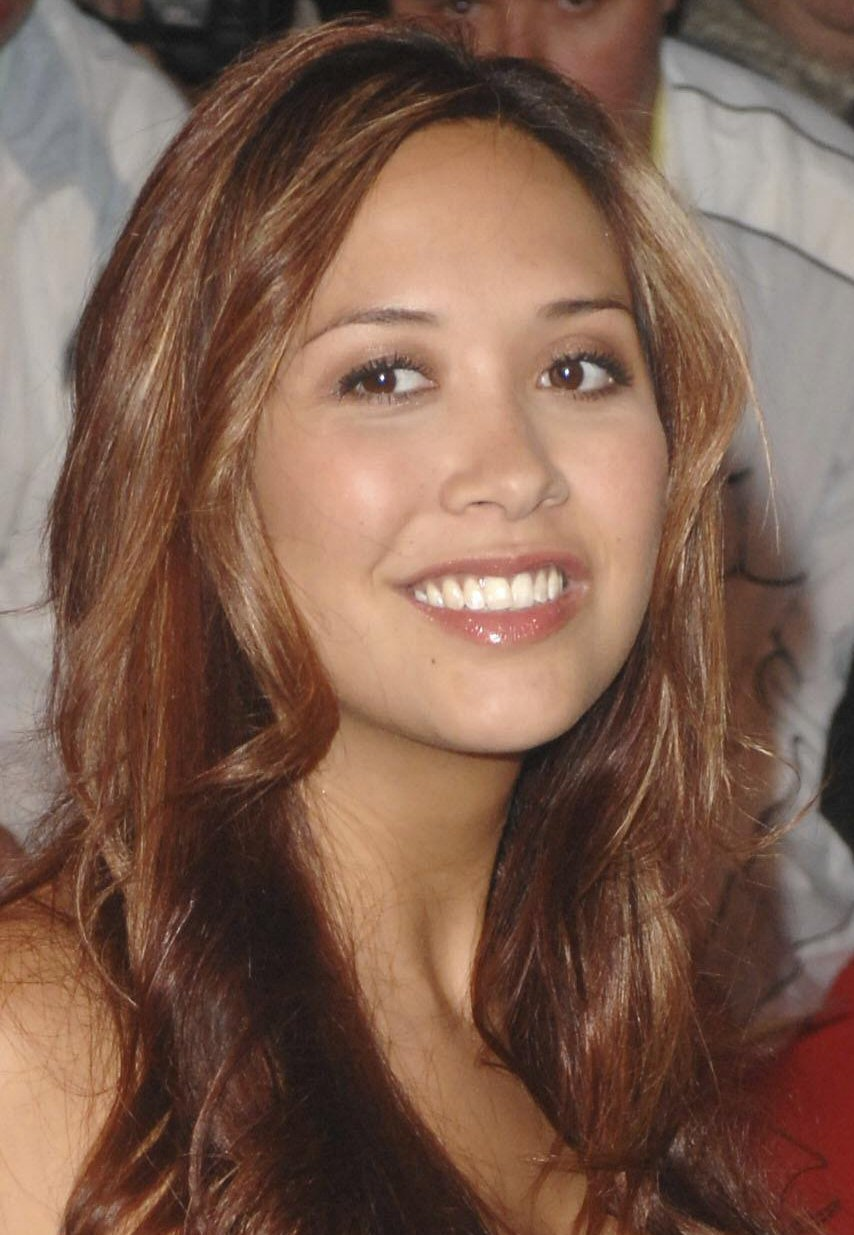
Myleene Klass, winner of South Africa series 1 (2023)

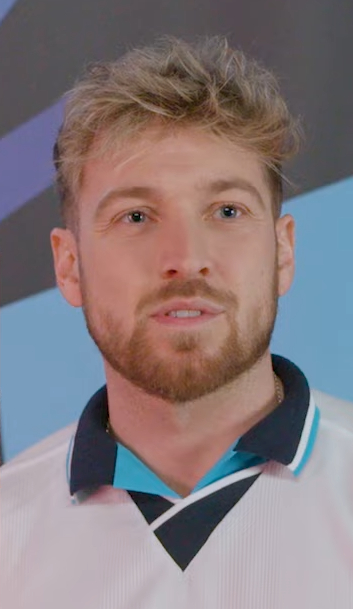
Sam Thompson, winner of series 23 (2023)

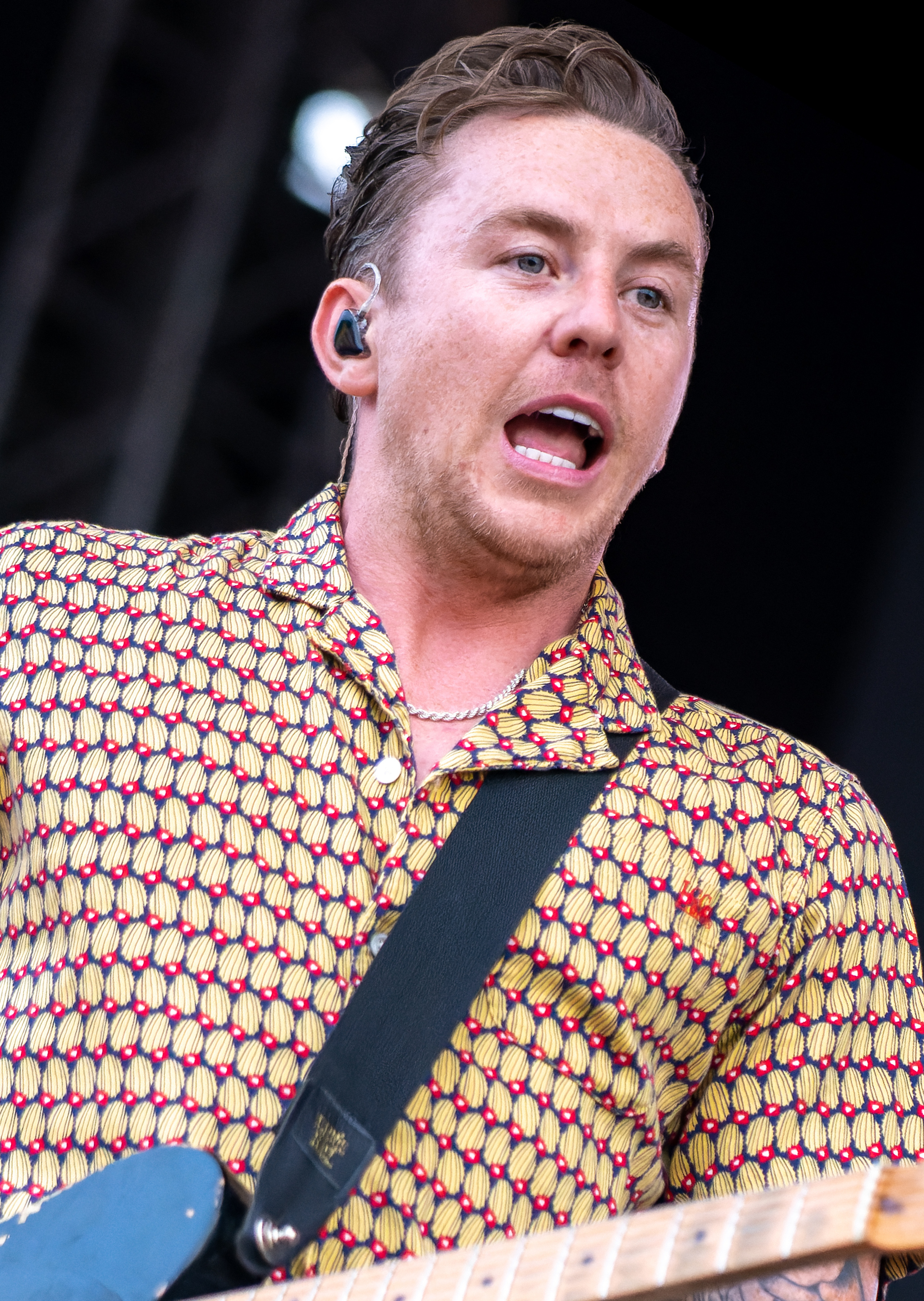
Danny Jones, winner of series 24 (2024)

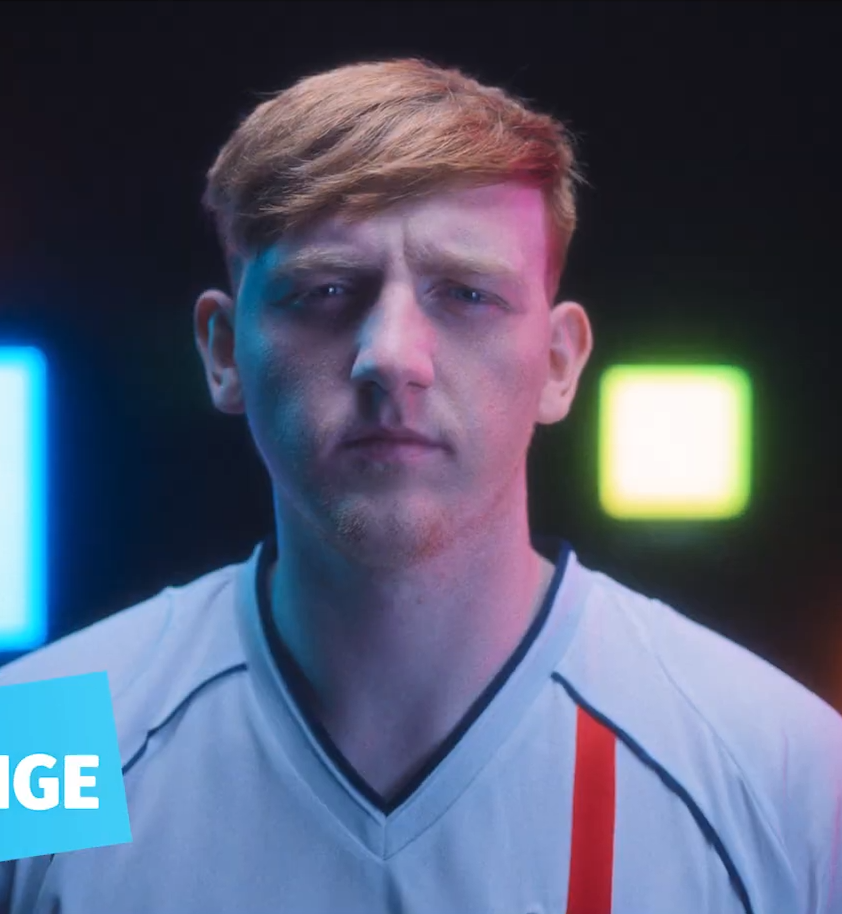
Angryginge, winner of series 25 (2025)

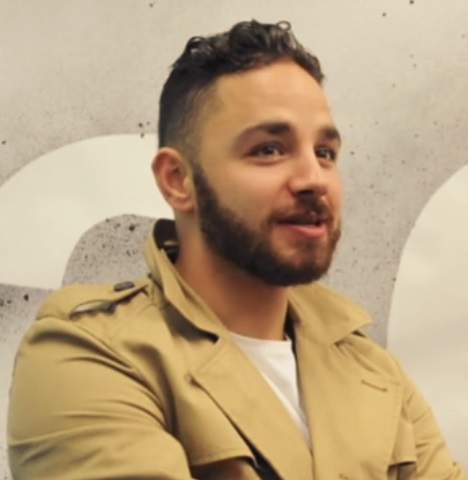
Adam Thomas, winner of South Africa series 2 (2026)
