= Sue Cleaver =

English actress (born 1963)

- Born: 2 September 1963 (age 63); Barnet, Hertfordshire, England
- Occupation: Actress
- Years active: 1993–present
- Known for: Coronation Street (1994, 2000–2025) dinnerladies (1999–2000); I'm a Celebrity...Get Me Out of Here! (2022)
- Spouses: James Quinn (m. 1993; div. 2003); Brian Owen
- Children: 1
- Relatives: Kate Harbour (half-sister)

Susan Owen (born 2 September 1963), known professionally as Sue Cleaver, is an English actress. She is best known for playing Eileen Grimshaw on the ITV soap opera Coronation Street from 2000 to 2025. In 2024 Cleaver became a panellist on Loose Women.

== Early life ==
Cleaver was born on 2 September 1963 in Barnet, Hertfordshire. She is adopted; however, she reconnected with her birth mother when she was in her twenties, and discovered she had two half-sisters, one of whom is the actress Kate Harbour.

== Career ==
She studied at the Manchester Metropolitan School of Theatre, and her first television appearance was a small part in an episode of A Touch of Frost. She went on to star in the acclaimed drama series Band of Gold before landing a role in the film Girls' Night alongside Julie Walters and Brenda Blethyn.

In 1998, she played Duty Sgt. Standish in the first series of The Cops, and also played Glenda, a woman delivering baked goods in Victoria Wood's BBC comedy series dinnerladies, appearing in four episodes from 1999 until 2000. She appeared as PC Sylvia Holland in This Is Personal: The Hunt for the Yorkshire Ripper, a miniseries, in 2000. She also had a small part in the Johnny Depp and Cate Blanchett film The Man Who Cried. It was after filming that role in 2000 that she was cast as Eileen Grimshaw on Coronation Street. Cleaver won praise for her portrayal of Eileen, the mother of a son, Todd, who struggles with his sexuality and comes out as gay.

Cleaver covered for Denise Robertson as the agony aunt on the ITV daytime programme This Morning until Robertson's death in 2016. Cleaver also completed three years of training to become a psychotherapist.

In 2022, Cleaver was a contestant on the twenty-second series of I'm a Celebrity...Get Me Out of Here!. She placed 9th after sixteen days in the jungle. The following year, Cleaver made a guest appearance on the ITV show Loose Women, and then became a regular panellist.

Cleaver published her first book, A Work In Progress, through Bloomsbury, in 2024. In 2026, Cleaver appeared on Series 21 of Celebrity Masterchef.

== Personal life ==
Cleaver was married to James Quinn between 1993 and 2003; the marriage produced one child. She later married Brian Owen, a lighting technician, after meeting him on the set of Coronation Street.

In March 2010, Cleaver was arrested for drink-driving. She was banned from driving for 17 months and ordered to pay a £1,000 fine.

== Charity ==
Cleaver is patron of the charities Prevent Breast Cancer and When You Wish Upon a Star.

== Filmography ==
Year	Title	Role	Notes
1994	A Touch of Frost	Patten's Receptionist	Episode: "Nothing to Hide"
1994	Coronation Street	Sister Treece	1 episode
1995	Band of Gold	Jan	2 episodes
1996	King Girl	Sam Miller	Television film
1998	Girls' Night	Rita	Film role
1998	Reckless: The Movie	Waitress	Television film
1998	The Cops	Duty Sgt. Standish	Series regular
1999	Casualty	Sue	Episode: "Mother's Day"
1999	Children's Ward	Mrs. Gartside	Episodes 11.4-8
1999	Peak Practice	Julie Watkins	Episode: "The First Stone"
1999–2000	dinnerladies	Glenda	Recurring; 4 episodes
2000	This Is Personal: The Hunt for the Yorkshire Ripper	Sylvia Holland	2 episodes
2000–2025	Coronation Street	Eileen Grimshaw	2230+ episodes
2000	City Central	Val	Episode: "Nutcase"
2000	The Man Who Cried	Red Cross Woman	Film role
2010	East Street	Eileen Grimshaw	Charity crossover between Coronation Street and EastEnders
2022	I'm a Celebrity...Get Me Out of Here!	Herself	Eliminated (9th place) on 21 November
2010, 2015, 2023–present	Loose Women	Herself	Guest panellist (2010, 2015, 2023); Regular panellist (2024–present)

== Awards and nominations ==
Year	Award	Category	Result	Ref.
2006	The British Soap Awards	Best Actress	Nominated	
2006	12th National Television Awards	Most Popular Actress	Nominated	
2007	TV Now Awards	Favourite Female Soap Star	Won	
2007	TVQuick & TVChoice Awards	Best Soap Actress	Won	
2007	The British Soap Awards	Best Actress	Nominated	
2007	The British Soap Awards	Best On-Screen Partnership (shared with Ryan Thomas)	Nominated	
2007	13th National Television Awards	Most Popular Actress	Nominated	
2008	Digital Spy Soap Awards	Most Popular Actress	Nominated	

== See also ==
- List of I'm a Celebrity...Get Me Out of Here! (British TV series) contestants
