= Scarlette Douglas =

English television presenter

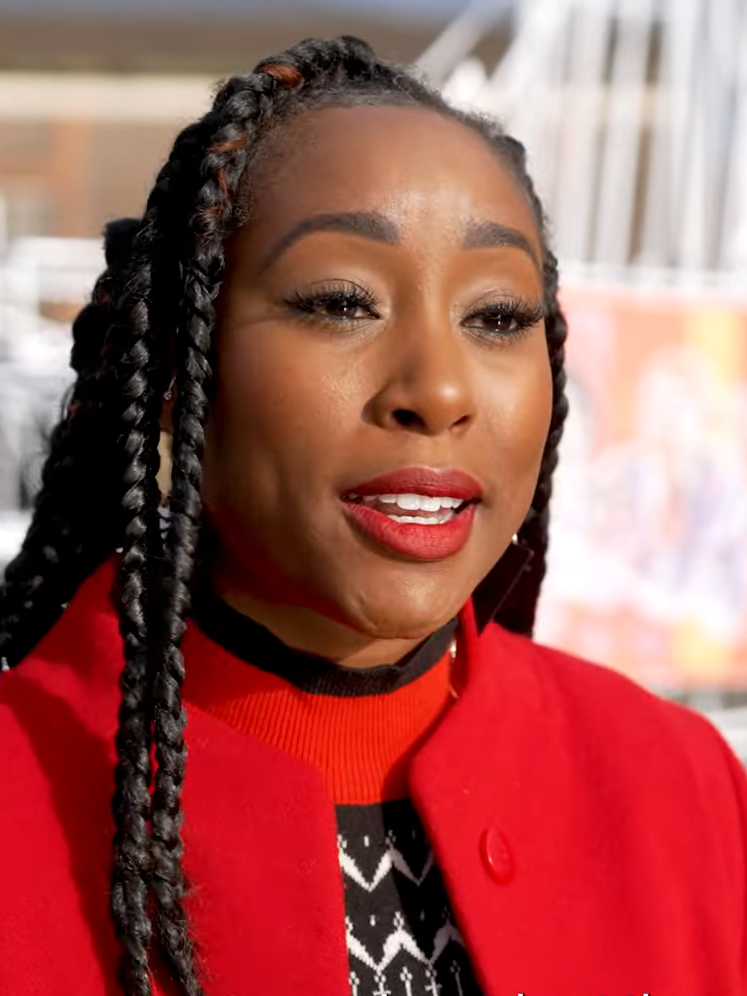
- Douglas in 2023
- Born: Charlotte Patricia Louise Douglas; 17 March 1987 (age 39); Enfield, London, England
- Occupations: Television presenter; singer; dancer; property expert
- Years active: 2008–present
- Television: A Place in the Sun; The One Show; Jeremy Vine; George Clarke's Flipping Fast; Worst House on the Street; I'm a Celebrity...Get Me Out of Here! (series 22); Good Morning Britain
- Relatives: Stuart Douglas (brother)
- Website: scarlettedouglas.com

Charlotte Patricia Louise Douglas (born 17 March 1987), known professionally as Scarlette Douglas, is an English television presenter, singer, dancer and television property expert. She is known for being one of the presenters on the Channel 4 series A Place in the Sun between 2015 and 2022.

She has also been a regular guest reporter on The One Show, Points of View and Jeremy Vine. Since 2022, she has presented George Clarke's Flipping Fast and Worst House on the Street for Channel 4, alongside her brother, Stuart Douglas.

== Life and career ==
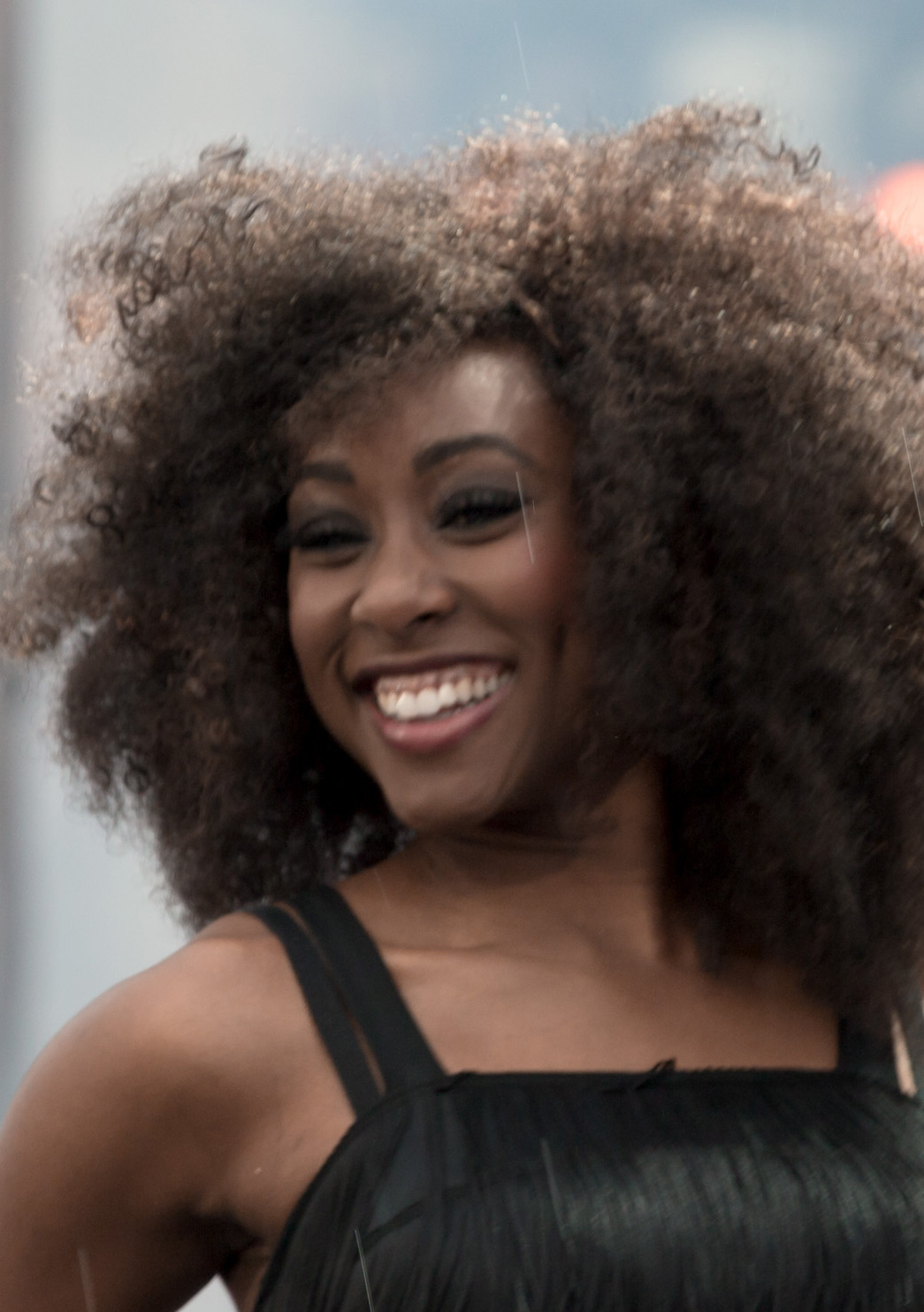
Douglas at the Eurovision Song Contest 2015

Charlotte Patricia Louise Douglas was born on 17 March 1987 in Enfield, London. She has two older brothers, Stuart and Andrew, Stuart being a retired professional footballer who played for Luton Town. Douglas began her career in musical theatre, appearing in various productions including Hairspray, Little Shop of Horrors and I Can't Sing!. She also worked as a backing singer and dancer on Thriller – Live and for Electro Velvet at the Eurovision Song Contest 2015.

In 2015, Douglas joined the Channel 4 lifestyle series A Place in the Sun as one of the presenters and property experts. She decided to leave the series in August 2022 after seven years to pursue other projects. In 2016, Douglas began appearing as a reporter on the BBC One series Points of View. Between 2017 and 2020, she appeared as a regular reporter on The One Show, as well as being as a guest presenter on the Channel 5 chat and debate show Jeremy Vine from 2019 to 2021. In 2020, Douglas presented Holiday Secrets... is Last Minute Best? on Channel 4.

In July 2022, Douglas, alongside her brother Stuart, presented Love It or List It as part of Channel 4's "Black to Front" special. In June 2022, the pair began presenting architect George Clarke's series George Clarke's Flipping Fast. In August 2022, they began presenting the property development series Worst House on the Street.

In November 2022, she took part in Series 22 of I'm a Celebrity...Get Me Out of Here!. She placed 10th after fifteen days in the jungle, being the second celebrity to be evicted.

In December 2022, she stood in for Richard Arnold as Good Morning Britain’s Entertainment presenter.

== Filmography ==
As herself
Year	Title	Notes	Ref.
2015–2022	A Place in the Sun	Presenter	
2016–2017	Points of View	Reporter	
2017–2020	The One Show	Reporter	
2019–2021	Jeremy Vine	Guest presenter	
2020	Holiday Secrets... is Last Minute Best?	Presenter	
2021	Love It or List It	Presenter	
2022–present	George Clarke's Flipping Fast	Co-presenter	
2022–present	Worst House on the Street	Co-presenter	
2022	I'm a Celebrity...Get Me Out of Here!	Contestant Series 22. Finished 10th place	
2022	Good Morning Britain	Stand-in Entertainment Presenter	
2023	Richard Osman's House of Games	Contestant	
2025–present	Can't Sell, Must Sell	Co-presenter	
