= Babatunde Aléshé =

British actor, comedian, and writer

- Born: Babatúndé Aléshé; 2 August 1986 (age 40); London, England
- Occupations: Actor; comedian; writer
- Website: babatundealeshe.com

Babatunde Aléshé (born 2 August 1986) is a British actor, comedian, and writer. He is known for appearing on several Celebrity Gogglebox specials, the 22nd series of I'm a Celebrity...Get Me Out of Here! in 2022, and the 18th series of Taskmaster in late 2024.

== Early life and education ==
Babatúndé Aléshé was born on 2 August 1986. He grew up in Tottenham, London, and is of Nigerian descent. His mother is a Christian and his father is a Muslim; Aléshé practises Christianity.

== Career ==
On stage, Aléshé has performed at the Soho Theatre, the Shaw Theatre, the O2 and the Hackney Empire.

He has featured as an actor on TV in Law & Order: UK, New Tricks, Doctor Who, Pelican Blood, Waking the Dead, EastEnders, and Frankie.

As himself, he has appeared on Celebrity Gogglebox, Soccer AM, Steph's Packed Lunch, The Weakest Link, and Richard Osman's House of Games. In 2022, Aléshé participated in the 22nd series of ITV's I'm a Celebrity...Get Me Out of Here!. He came seventh, after spending eighteen days in the jungle.

In September 2022, Aléshé began his UK stand-up tour Babahood.

In 2024, Aléshé appeared as a contestant in the 18th series of Taskmaster, alongside Andy Zaltzman, Emma Sidi, Jack Dee, and Rosie Jones. He finished in 4th place.

Aléshé played the character of Jordan in William Ivory's play The Market Deeping Model Railway Club, which premiered at Nottingham Playhouse in July 2026.

== Personal life ==
Aléshé married his wife, Leonie, in 2015. They have two children together and reside in Hertfordshire.

== Awards ==
He has won the Amused Moose National New Comic Award (2019) and Best Newcomer at the Black Entertainment Comedy Awards.

== Filmography ==
Year	Title	Role	Notes
2009	Law & Order: UK	Jason	
2009	New Tricks	Young Mechanic	
2010	Doctor Who	Sean	Episode: "The Lodger"
2010	Pelican Blood	Craig	
2011	Waking the Dead	Karl Barclay	2 episodes
2011	EastEnders	Sam	4 episodes
2012	Friday UK	Craig UK	Short film
2013	Frankie	Tim Partington	1 episode
2013	Adots Apprentice		Television miniseries; co-writer
2016	The Naked Poet	Femi	
2020–present	Celebrity Gogglebox	Himself; alongside Mo Gilligan	5 Series
2021	The Standup Sketch Show		
2022	Richard Osman's House of Games	Himself; contestant	
2022	I'm a Celebrity...Get Me Out of Here!	Himself; contestant	Placed 7th
2022	Sorry, I Didn't Know	Himself	
2023	Big Brother: Late and Live	Himself	
2023	Sumotherhood	PC Williams	
2024	MOBO Awards	Host	with Indiyah Polack
2024	The Big Fat Quiz of Telly	Himself	
2024	Taskmaster	Himself; contestant	Series 18 / 10 episodes
2025	Strictly Come Dancing Chrismas Special	Himself; contestant	With Nancy Xu
2026	The Great British Bake Off Stand Up Cancer	Himself; contestant	Series 9 Episode 1
