= I'm a Celebrity...Get Me Out of Here! (British TV series) series 22 =

I'm a Celebrity...Get Me Out of Here!
- Series 22
- Presented by: Anthony McPartlin; Declan Donnelly
- No. of days: 22
- No. of castaways: 12
- Winner: Jill Scott
- Runner-up: Owen Warner
- Location: Murwillumbah, New South Wales, Australia
- No. of episodes: 22

Release
- Original network: ITV
- Original release: 6 November – 27 November 2022

Series chronology
- ← Previous; Series 21 Next → Series 23

I'm a Celebrity...Get Me Out of Here! returned for its twenty-second series on 6 November 2022 on ITV. The series returned to Murwillumbah, New South Wales, Australia, for the first time since 2019, following the easing of travel restrictions surrounding the COVID-19 pandemic. Ant & Dec returned to present the series.

On 27 November, Jill Scott was crowned the new queen of the jungle, with Owen Warner finishing in second place and Matt Hancock in third place.

Seann Walsh would return to the series four years later to participate in the second series of I'm a Celebrity... South Africa alongside other former contestants to try become the second I'm a Celebrity legend. He was the first celebrity to be eliminated.

== Production ==
Due to the COVID-19 pandemic in Australia, the twentieth and twenty-first series were filmed at Gwrych Castle in Abergele, Wales. Following the conclusion of the latter, media speculation began as to whether the series would return to Australia. It was also confirmed that ITV would film an "All-Stars" series in South Africa, featuring former campmates and scheduled to air in 2023. However, it was stated that this series would be aired as a backup option if the show was unable to return to Australia during the regular November period.

In August 2022, it was confirmed that the series would return to Australia for the first time since the nineteenth series. Prior to the series, it was announced that Bob McCarron, known informally as "Medic Bob", who had been the show's medic since its inception, would not be returning to the series. McCarron did not appear in the 2020 and 2021 series due to COVID-19 travel restrictions.

On 7 October 2022, ITV released the first trailer for the series, a ten-second teaser featuring a helicopter flying through the sky on the way to Australia, as Donnelly exclaims "Where is the luggage going?" with McPartlin replying "It's meeting us there". A full-length trailer was released a week later, depicting Ant & Dec parachuting out of a helicopter into the jungle surrounded by camp essentials.

The series began on 6 November, 2 weeks earlier than usual due to the 2022 FIFA World Cup.

== Celebrities ==
The line-up was announced by ITV on 31 October 2022. The following day, it was confirmed that Conservative Party politician Matt Hancock would be joining the line-up as a late arrival, a decision that was widely criticised by the media and ultimately led to his suspension from the Conservative parliamentary group and its whip. Stand-up comedian Seann Walsh was later confirmed as the second late arrival and entered the jungle alongside Hancock on 8 November.

On 7 November, television personality Olivia Attwood was forced to withdraw from the series for medical reasons, with a spokesperson stating that "the medical team has advised it is not safe for [Attwood] to return to camp as there needs to be further investigation." Attwood later confirmed that she had been forced to leave after undergoing blood tests which determined she was anaemic.

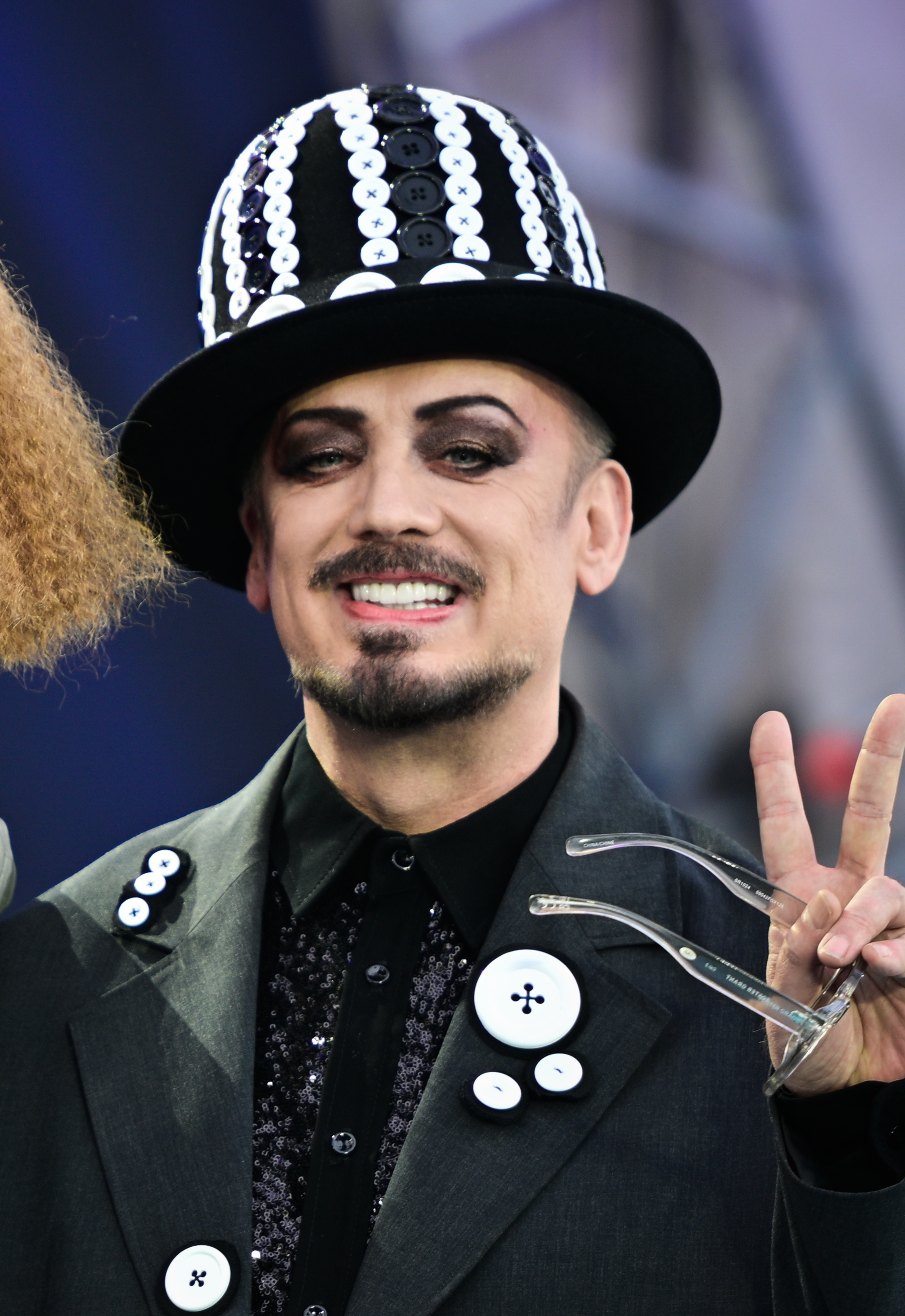
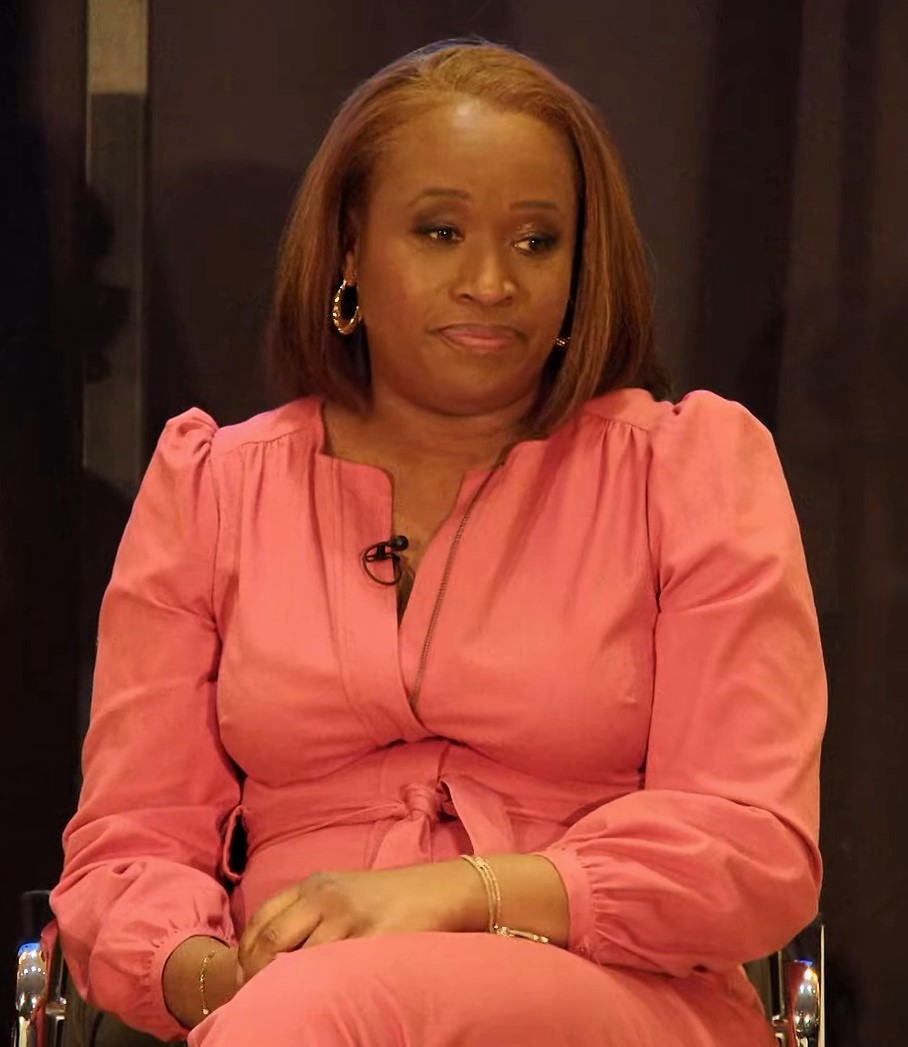
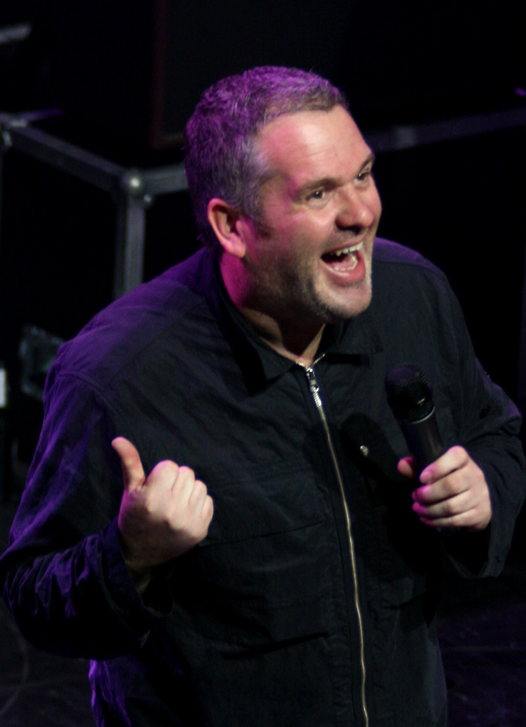
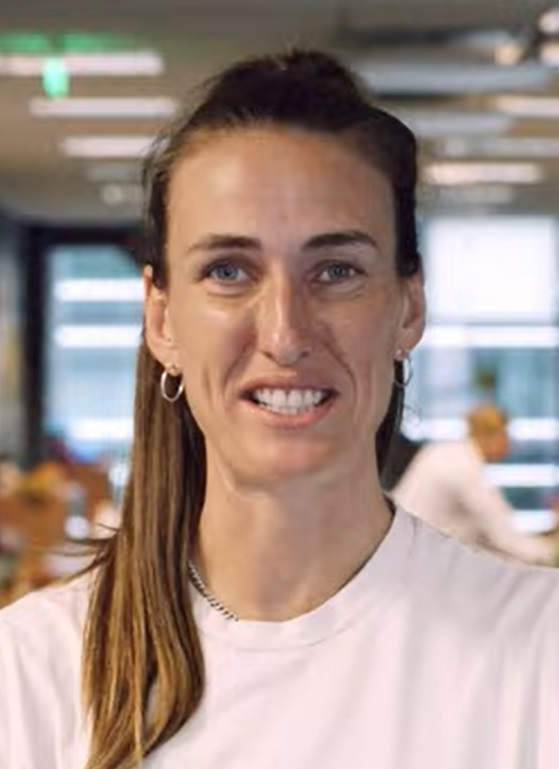
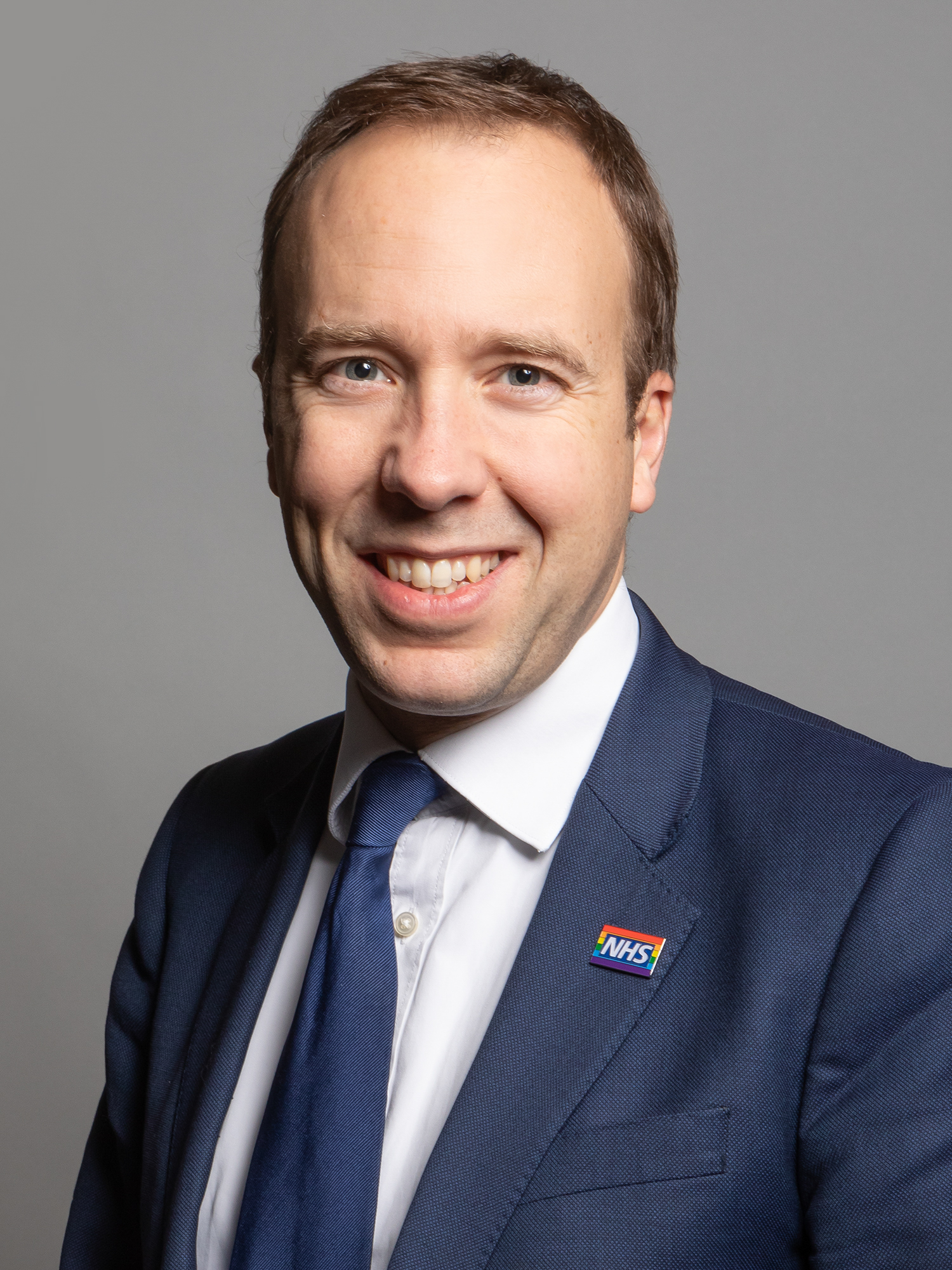
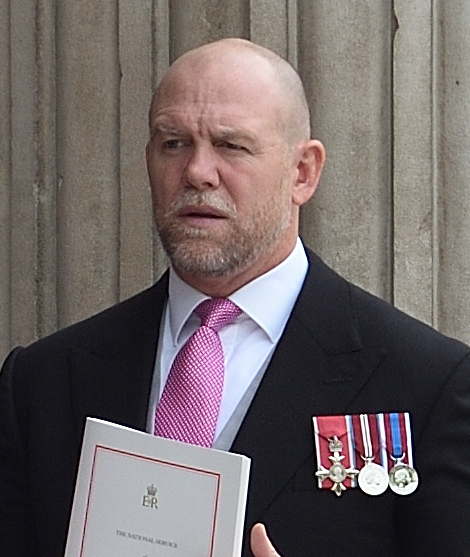
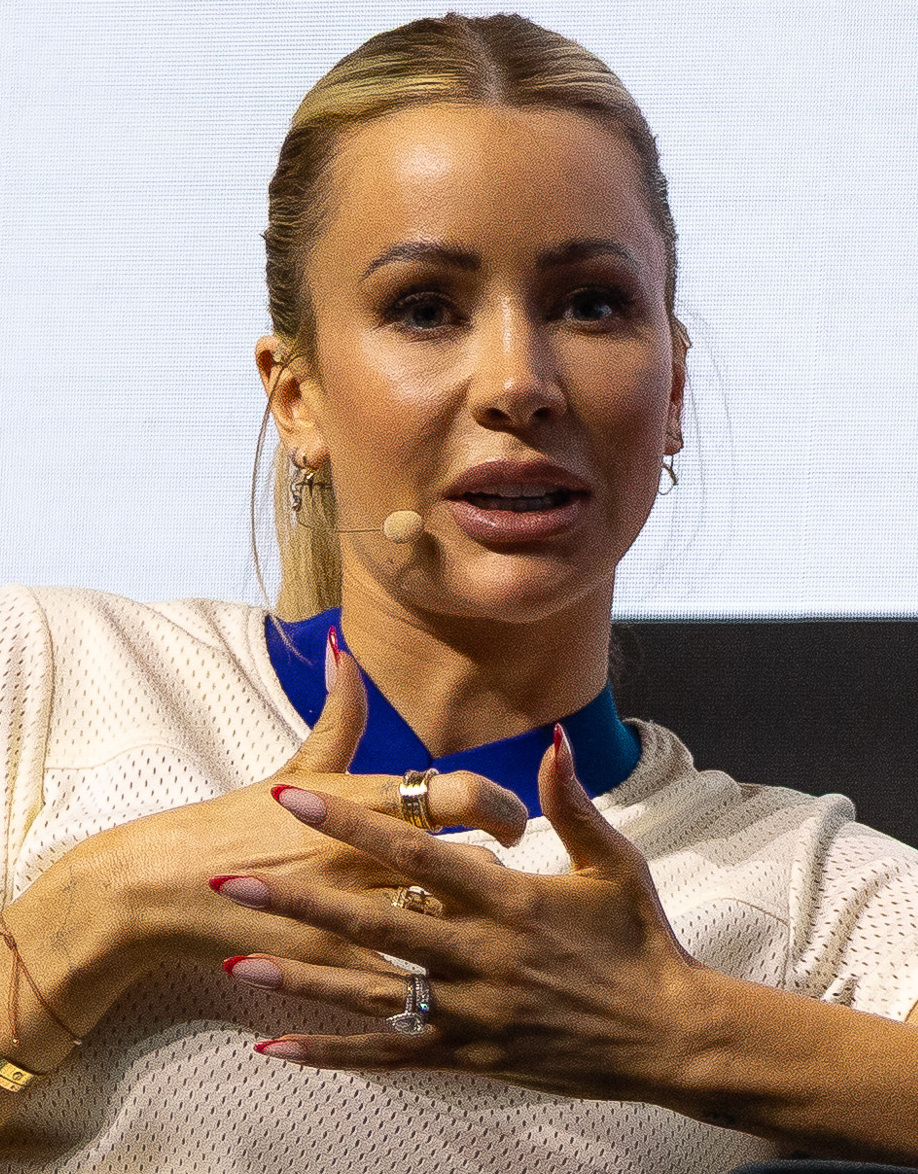
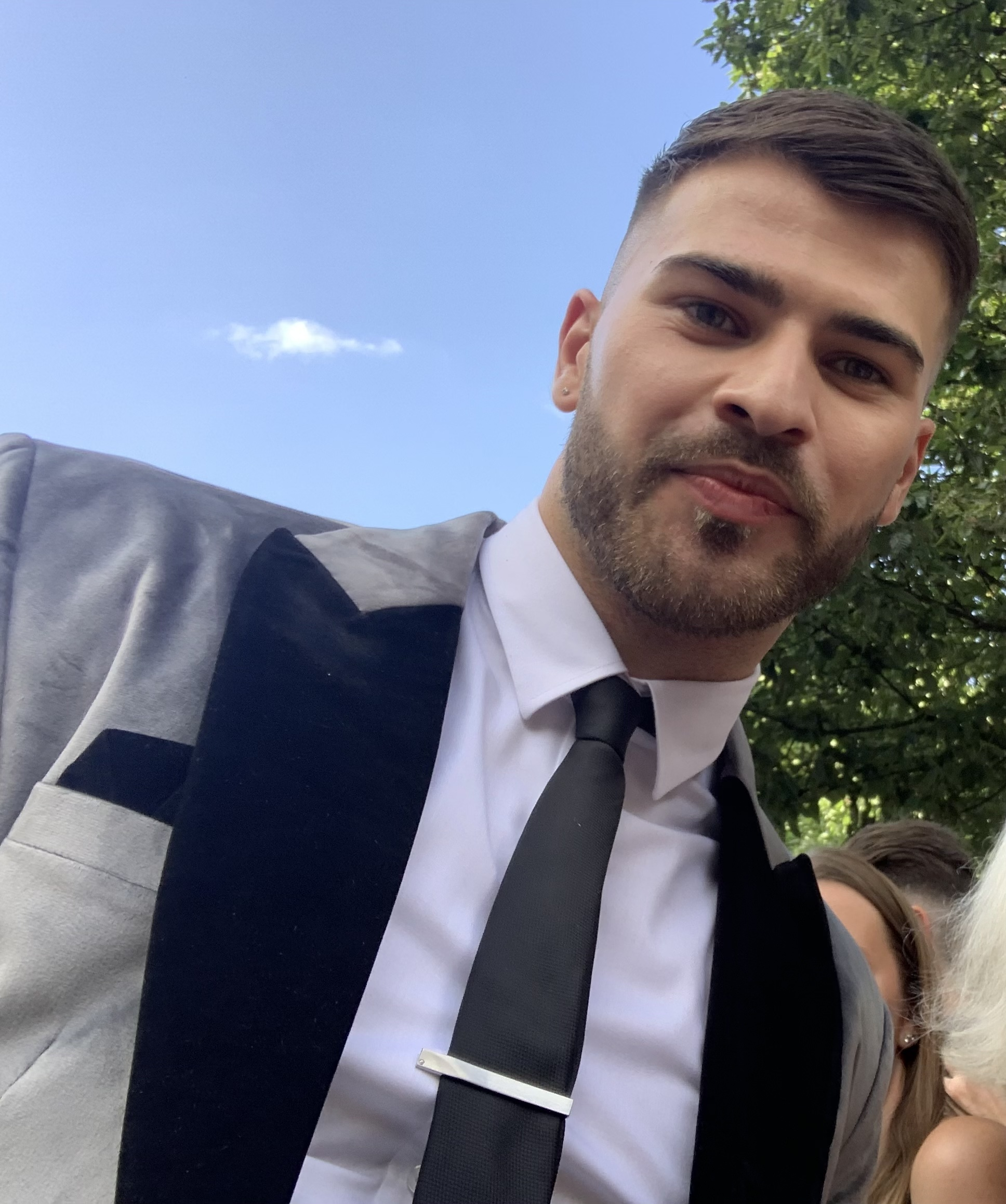
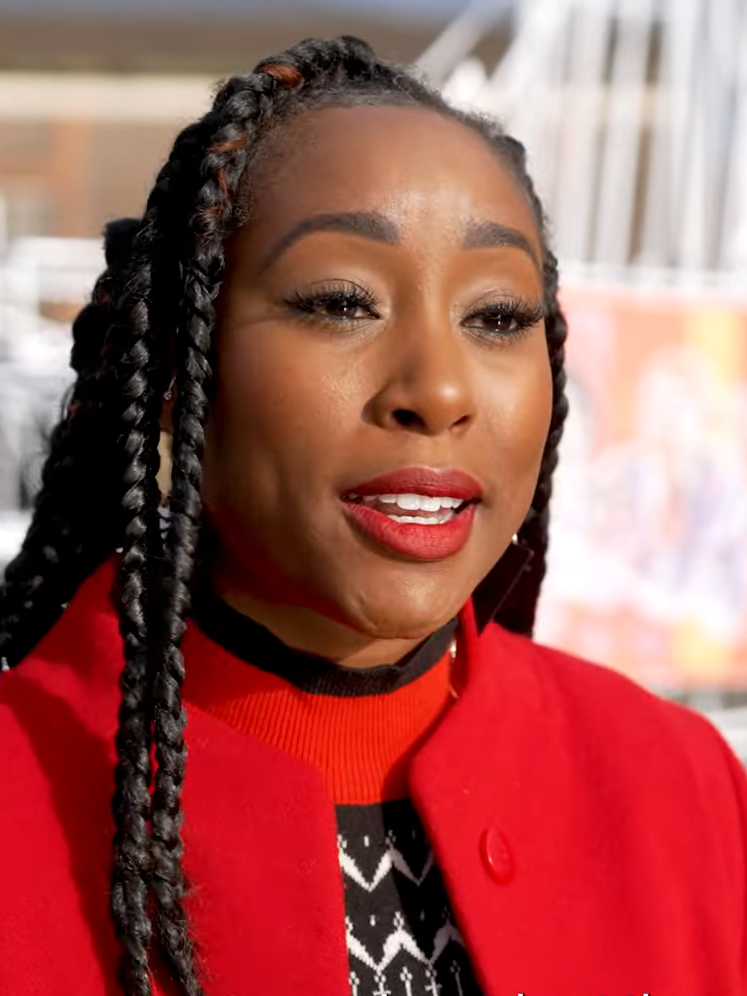
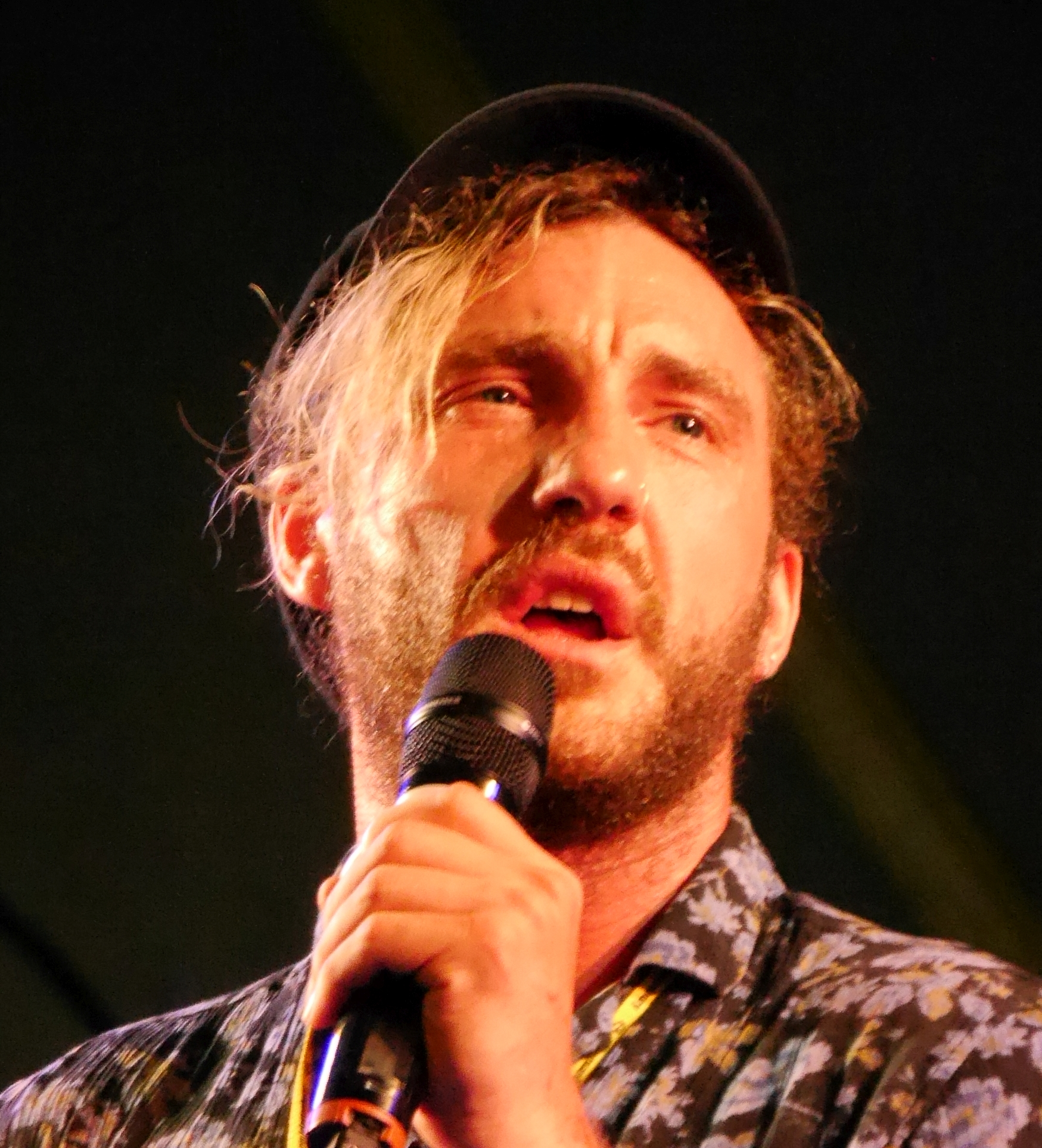
From left to right: Boy George, Charlene White, Chris Moyles, Jill Scott, Matt Hancock, Mike Tindall, Olivia Attwood, Owen Warner, Scarlette Douglas, and Seann Walsh.
Not pictured: Babatunde Aléshé, and Sue Cleaver.

Celebrity	Known for	Status
Jill Scott	Former England footballer	Winner on 27 November 2022
Owen Warner	Hollyoaks actor	Runner-up on 27 November 2022
Matt Hancock	Conservative Party politician	Third place on 27 November 2022
Mike Tindall	Former England rugby player	Eliminated 8th on 26 November 2022
Seann Walsh	Stand-up comedian	Eliminated 7th on 25 November 2022
Chris Moyles	Radio & television presenter	Eliminated 6th on 24 November 2022
Babatunde Aléshé	Actor & comedian	Eliminated 5th on 23 November 2022
Boy George	Culture Club singer	Eliminated 4th on 22 November 2022
Sue Cleaver	Coronation Street actress	Eliminated 3rd on 21 November 2022
Scarlette Douglas	Former A Place in the Sun presenter	Eliminated 2nd on 20 November 2022
Charlene White	ITV News & Loose Women presenter	Eliminated 1st on 18 November 2022
Olivia Attwood	Television personality & Love Island 3 star	Withdrew on 7 November 2022

== Results and elimination ==
Indicates that the celebrity was immune from the vote
Indicates that the celebrity received the most votes from the public, and was crowned the winner
Indicates that the celebrity received the 2nd most votes from the public, and was the runner up.
Indicates that the celebrity received the fewest votes and was eliminated immediately (no bottom two)
Indicates that the celebrity was named as being in the bottom two
Indicates that the celebrity withdrew from the competition

Daily results per celebrity
Celebrity	Day 13	Day 15	Day 16	Day 17	Day 18	Day 19	Day 20	Day 21	Day 22		Number of Trials	Number of DOW Challenges
Celebrity	Day 13	Day 15	Day 16	Day 17	Day 18	Day 19	Day 20	Day 21	Round 1	Round 2	Number of Trials	Number of DOW Challenges
Jill	Safe	Safe	Safe	Safe	Safe	Safe	Safe	Safe	1st 47.29%	1st 57.66%	8	4
Owen	Safe	Safe	Safe	Safe	Safe	Safe	Bottom two	Safe	2nd 30.99%	2nd 42.34%	9	5
Matt	Safe	Safe	Safe	Safe	Safe	Safe	Safe	Safe	3rd 21.72%	Eliminated (Day 22)	10	3
Mike	Safe	Safe	Safe	Safe	Safe	Safe	Safe	4th	Eliminated (Day 21)		6	4
Seann	Safe	Safe	Safe	Safe	Bottom two	Bottom two	5th	Eliminated (Day 20)			3	3
Chris	Safe	Safe	Safe	Bottom two	Safe	6th	Eliminated (Day 19)				5	3
Babatúndé	Safe	Bottom two	Safe	Safe	7th	Eliminated (Day 18)					6	3
Boy George	Safe	Safe	Bottom two	8th	Eliminated (Day 17)						6	0
Sue	Bottom two	Safe	9th	Eliminated (Day 16)							3	1
Scarlette	Safe	10th	Eliminated (Day 15)								3	1
Charlene	11th	Eliminated (Day 13)									3	1
Olivia	Withdrew (Day 2)										1	0
Notes	None								1			
Bottom two (named in)	Charlene, Sue	Babatúndé, Scarlette	Boy George, Sue	Boy George, Chris	Babatúndé, Seann	Chris, Seann	Owen, Seann	None				
Eliminated	Charlene; Fewest votes to save	Scarlette; Fewest votes to save	Sue; Fewest votes to save	Boy George; Fewest votes to save	Babatúndé; Fewest votes to save	Chris; Fewest votes to save	Seann; Fewest votes to save	Mike; Fewest votes to save	Matt; 21.72% to win	Owen; 42.34% to win		
Eliminated	Charlene; Fewest votes to save	Scarlette; Fewest votes to save	Sue; Fewest votes to save	Boy George; Fewest votes to save	Babatúndé; Fewest votes to save	Chris; Fewest votes to save	Seann; Fewest votes to save	Mike; Fewest votes to save	Matt; 21.72% to win	Jill; 57.66% to win		

- ^Note 1: The public voted for who they wanted to win, rather than save.

== Bushtucker trials ==
The contestants take part in daily trials to earn food. These trials aim to test both physical and mental abilities. The winner is usually determined by the number of stars collected during the trial, with each star representing a meal earned by the winning contestant for their fellow campmates.

The public voted for who they wanted to face the trial
The contestants decided who would face the trial
The trial was compulsory and neither the public nor celebrities decided who took part

Trial number	Air date	Name of trial	Celebrity participation	Winner/Number of stars	Notes
1	6 November	Walk the Plank	Babatúndé; Charlene; Jill	2/3 stars	—N/a
2	6 November	Critter Cruise	Mike; Owen; Sue	3/3 stars	—N/a
3	7 November	HMS Drown Under	Boy George; Olivia	8/10 stars	2
3	7 November	HMS Drown Under	Chris; Scarlette	8/10 stars	2
4	8 November	Horrifying Heights	Babatúndé	9/9 stars	3
5	9 November	Beastly Burrows	Matt; Seann	6/11 stars	—N/a
6	10 November	Tentacles of Terror	Matt	11/11 stars	4
7	11 November	La Cucaracha Café	Boy George; Matt	11/11 stars	5
8	12 November	Who Wants to Look Silly on Air?	Matt; Owen	5/11 stars	—N/a
9	13 November	House of Horrors	Matt	9/11 stars	—N/a
10	14 November	Deserted Down Under	Matt	7/11 stars	—N/a
11	15 November	Angel of Agony	Bábatundé; Boy George; Chris	3/11 stars	—N/a
12	16 November	Boiling Point	Chris	1/11 stars	4
13	17 November	The Scare Ground	Jill; Mike; Owen	Jill; Matt; Sue	6
14	17 November	The Jungle On Sea	Babatúndé; Scarlette; Owen	8/8 stars	7
15	18 November	The Watery Grave	Boy George; Charlene	2/11 stars	4
16	19 November	Partners in Grime	Babatúndé; Boy George; Chris; Jill; Matt; Mike; Owen; Scarlette; Seann; Sue	10/10 stars	—N/a
17	20 November	Speak Uneasy	Jill; Mike	10/10 stars	—N/a
18	21 November	Boiling Point: The Return	Owen	9/9 stars	—N/a
19	22 November	Grot Yoga	Boy George; Mike; Seann	8/8 stars	—N/a
20	23 November	Critty Critty Fang Fang	Jill	7/7 stars	—N/a
21	24 November	Savage Sorting Office	Chris; Owen	1/6 stars	—N/a
22	25 November	Fallen Stars	Matt; Mike	4/5 stars	—N/a
23	26 November	Celebrity Cyclone	Jill; Matt; Mike; Owen	4/4 stars	—N/a
24	27 November	Rat Race	Jill	5/5 stars	8
25	27 November	Bushtucker Bonanza	Owen	5/5 stars	8
26	27 November	Flood Your Face	Matt	5/5 stars	8

- ^Note 2: A public vote opened a week before the series began, to determine who would become Jungle VIPs (Very Isolated People); these were ultimately Olivia and Boy George, who each had to choose a plus one to accompany them, and they chose Chris and Scarlette respectively. They spent the first night on a deserted island, away from the main camp, and ultimately faced the first Trial.
- ^Note 3: Boy George, Mike and Sue were exempt from this Trial.
- ^Note 4: Babatúndé was exempt from this Trial.
- ^Note 5: Sue was exempt from this Trial.
- ^Note 6: For this Trial, the celebs were competing to win balls, rather than stars, to see which 3 celebs will win a luxury BBQ on the beach. Jill, Matt and Sue's balls were drawn.
- ^Note 7: For this Trial, three celebrities were chosen at random from the tombola by Ant & Dec.
- ^Note 8: For this Trial, each celebrity were competing for starters, main courses, desserts, drinks, and treats of their choice.

== Star count ==
Celebrity	Number of stars earned	Percentage
Charlene White	4/14 stars	28%
Olivia Attwood	8/10 stars	80%
Sue Cleaver	13/13 stars	100%
Chris Moyles	23/48 stars	48%
Seann Walsh	24/29 stars	82%
Scarlette Douglas	26/28 stars	93%
Babatúndé Aléshé	32/41 stars	78%
Jill Scott	38/39 stars	97%
Mike Tindall	39/40 stars	97%
Boy George	42/62 stars	78%
Owen Warner	45/56 stars	80%
Matt Hancock	72/90 stars	80%

== Deals on Wheels challenges ==
As well as competing in the Bushtucker trials, celebrities have to complete in 'Deals on Wheels challenges' (formerly 'Dingo Dollar Challenges') in order to earn treats for the camp. At least two celebrities are chosen to compete in the challenge. These are often mental challenges, rather than challenges including critters. They must complete the challenge they have been given in order to win 'Dingo Dollars'.

After completion of the challenge, the celebrities will take the Dingo Dollars and purchase a snack option (formerly campmates were able to pick between two options) from Kiosk Kev (Mark Herlaar), who rides in on a bicycle. Before they are allowed to take the prize, the other celebrities back at the living quarters must answer a trivia question. If they get the question right, they will earn the treat, but if they get it wrong, the celebrities will go back empty-handed.

The celebrities got the question correct
The celebrities got the question wrong
No question was given, as the celebrities failed to complete the challenge in time.
No question was asked

Episode	Air date	Celebrities	Prize	Notes
2	8 November	Jill; Owen	Custard Creams	—N/a
5	11 November	Bábatundé; Mike	Nachos with guacamole	—N/a
6	12 November	Chris; Jill; Sue	Popcorn	—N/a
8	14 November	Owen; Scarlette	—N/a	9
9	15 November	Charlene; Mike; Seann	Jelly Babies	—N/a
12	18 November	Babatúndé; Chris	Chocolate	—N/a
13	19 November	Matt; Owen	Cheese & Biscuits	—N/a
15	21 November	Babatúndé; Seann	Love Hearts	—N/a
16	22 November	Chris; Owen	Brownies & the result to the England v Iran World Cup match	—N/a
17	23 November	Mike; Matt	Chocolate Chip Cookies	—N/a
18	24 November	Jill; Seann	Mars Bars	—N/a
20	26 November	Jill; Matt; Mike; Owen	Brownies, Cheese & Crackers, Chocolate, Nachos with guacamole	10

- ^Note 9: As Owen and Scarlette failed to complete the challenge within the time limit, they failed the task, meaning they did not win the dollars and therefore no question was asked.
- ^Note 10: This was not a traditional challenge and did not feature Kiosk Kev, but rather the remaining celebrities having to attribute quotes that had been said during the series to a contestant. The celebrities matched all quotes correctly and therefore won portions of treats that had not been previously won.

== Ratings ==
Official ratings are taken from BARB, utilising the four-screen dashboard which includes viewers who watched the programme on laptops, smartphones and tablets within 7 days of the original broadcast.

Episode	Air date	Official rating (millions incl. HD & +1)	Weekly rank for all UK TV channels
1	6 November	12.34	1
2	7 November	11.55	2
3	8 November	11.44	3
4	9 November	11.74	1
5	10 November	11.05	6
6	11 November	11.14	5
7	12 November	10.36	7
8	13 November	11.16	4
9	14 November	11.01	1
10	15 November	10.74	2
11	16 November	10.73	3
12	17 November	10.50	6
13	18 November	10.43	7
14	19 November	10.54	5
15	20 November	10.60	4
16	21 November	10.99	3
17	22 November	10.28	6
18	23 November	10.17	7
19	24 November	10.10	8
20	25 November	10.99	4
21	26 November	10.95	5
22	27 November	11.87	2
Series average	2022	10.94	—N/a
Coming Out	1 December	6.84	5
