= House of Games =

British TV quiz show (2017–present)

- Also known as: Richard Osman's House of Games
- Genre: Quiz show
- Directed by: Ollie Bartlett; John Smith
- Presented by: Richard Osman (2017–2026); Michael Sheen (2026–present)
- Theme music composer: Marc Sylvan
- Country of origin: United Kingdom
- Original language: English
- No. of series: 10
- No. of episodes: 846

Production
- Executive producers: Alexandra McLeod; Tamara Gilder; Richard Hague; Stephen Lovelock
- Producer: Stuart Harrison
- Production locations: The Hospital Club (2017–18); BBC Scotland Street (2019–2023); Riverside Studios (2020–21); dock10 studios (2024–present)
- Camera setup: Multi-camera
- Running time: 30 minutes
- Production company: Remarkable Entertainment

Original release
- Network: BBC Two
- Release: 4 September 2017 – present
- Network: BBC One (primetime)
- Release: 20 November 2020 – 5 November 2021

Related
- Richard Osman's House of Games Night

House of Games (credited as Richard Osman's House of Games for its first nine series) is a British quiz show produced by Banijay UK Productions subsidiary Remarkable Entertainment for the BBC. The show is played on a weekly basis, with four celebrities playing on five consecutive days to win daily prizes, and the weekly prize of being crowned as "House of Games" champion. Points are accrued depending on where each celebrity finishes on each day and the points are doubled on Friday's show.

Richard Osman hosted House of Games from its start in September 2017. In October 2026, he was replaced as host by actor Michael Sheen.

== Format ==
The host sits in a chair to the left of the screen, while the four celebrities sit in a line in individual chairs. The host hits a "buzzer" on his table, activating a round generator, which is displayed on a big screen. He then explains what the round is about and in what format it will take place – for example, whether it is a buzzer round, a pairs round, or one in which the players require use of their tablet computers. Five rounds are played each day, with the second round being played in pairs, and the final round always being "Answer Smash". The first round is quick general knowledge questions with a comic twist, such as rhyming words. The fourth round is typically "slow", where the question takes several minutes to be answered, and only one contestant receives a single point each time. In most games a point is awarded for each correct answer, but in "Answer Smash", points are also deducted for incorrect answers.

At the end of each day, the scores are announced and the winner wins a daily prize, which is usually a normal everyday object of some description with the "House of Games" logo imprinted on it (the logo being a turquoise-blue background with a depiction of the host's facial features). The points are then converted to four points for the winner, three for second place, two for third place and one for fourth place onto the weekly leader board; in Friday's "Double Points Friday" edition, the points awarded double to eight, six, four and two. The weekly winner receives the "House of Games" trophy (a silver cup with the host's depiction on it) from the host. If there are two players tied for first place at the end of the week, both players are declared joint winners and win a trophy each. In more recent episodes, a tie for first place is resolved by a tie-break question; the first to buzz in wins if they answer correctly or their opponent wins if they answer incorrectly.

Beginning with Series 3, special "House of Champions" episodes aired featuring players who had previously won a daily or weekly edition of the show coming back for another week to fight for the Gold Champions Trophy. There were also daily prizes, which were similar to the prizes on the regular version of the show. However, these prizes were mainly gold, rather than the turquoise-blue colour. From series 6 onwards, there were also special "Redemption" weeks with four previous losing contestants who had never won a day prize.

A week's worth of shows is recorded on a single day, so the celebrities are booked for only one day, changing outfits between shows.

== Contestants ==
Weekly winners in bold.

=== Series 1 ===
- Week 1 (4–8 September 2017): **Nish Kumar**, Anneka Rice, Clara Amfo and Al Murray
- Week 2 (11–15 September 2017): Angela Scanlon, Clive Myrie, Sara Pascoe and **Rick Edwards**
- Week 3 (18–22 September 2017): Anita Rani, Chris Ramsey, Janet Ellis and **Jamie Theakston**

=== Series 2 ===
- Week 1 (28 May–1 June 2018): **Naga Munchetty**, Jordan Stephens, Sally Lindsay and David O'Doherty
- Week 2 (4–8 June 2018): Ellie Taylor, **Steve Pemberton**, Fern Britton and Josh Widdicombe
- Week 3 (11–15 June 2018): Shappi Khorsandi, Michael Buerk, **Amanda Abbington** and Elis James
- Week 4 (18, 20, 20–22 June 2018): Beattie Edmondson, Amol Rajan, Gaby Roslin and **Hugh Dennis**
- Week 5 (25–29 June 2018): Chizzy Akudolu, **Charlie Higson**, Kate Williams and Tom Allen
- Week 6 (12–16 November 2018): Rachel Riley, JB Gill, Katie Derham and **Richard Herring**
- Week 7 (19–23 November 2018): Lolly Adefope, Dan Walker, Sarah Greene and **Miles Jupp**
- Week 8 (26–30 November 2018): Samantha Womack, Rory Reid, Anne Diamond and **James Acaster**
- Week 9 (3–6, 8 December 2018): Kelly Cates, Tyger Drew-Honey, Desiree Burch and **Matt Allwright**
- Week 10 (10–14 December 2018): Susie Dent, Nick Owen, Chemmy Alcott and **Dane Baptiste**

=== Series 3 ===
- Week 1 (7–11 October 2019): Miquita Oliver, **Ed Gamble**, Kate Thornton and Ade Edmondson
- Week 2 (14–18 October 2019): **Scarlett Moffatt**, Iain Stirling, Angellica Bell and Gyles Brandreth
- Week 3 (21–25 October 2019): Kate Humble, Ivo Graham, Andi Oliver and **Phill Jupitus**
- Week 4 (28 October–1 November 2019): June Sarpong, Dev Griffin, Debbie McGee and **Alex Horne**
- Week 5 (4–8 November 2019): Nina Wadia, Johnny Ball, Suzi Ruffell and **Danny Wallace**
- Week 6 (11–15 November 2019): Jay Blades, **Rachel Parris**, Shaun Keaveny and **Jan Ravens** (tie between Parris and Ravens)
- Week 7 (18–22 November 2019): **Kate Bottley**, John Thomson, YolanDa Brown and Joel Dommett
- Week 8 (25–29 November 2019): Charlene White, Gregg Wallace, Holly Walsh and **Chris Hollins**
- **House of Champions** Week 1 (2–5 and 7 December 2019): Scarlett Moffatt, **Rick Edwards**, Naga Munchetty and David O'Doherty
- **House of Champions** Week 2 (9–13 December 2019): June Sarpong, **Richard Herring**, Kate Williams and Dane Baptiste
- Week 9 (6–10 January 2020): Rose Matafeo, Rav Wilding, Valerie Singleton and **Gary Delaney**
- Week 10 (13–17 January 2020): Andrea McLean, **Phil Wang**, Rita Simons and Adil Ray
- Week 11 (20–24 January 2020): Michelle Ackerley, **Matt Forde**, Judy Murray and Fred MacAulay
- Week 12 (27–31 January 2020): Kerry Godliman, Radzi Chinyanganya, Ebony Rainford-Brent and **Hal Cruttenden**
- Week 13 (3–7 February 2020): Lou Sanders, Richard Coles, Maggie Aderin-Pocock and **Stuart Maconie**
- Week 14 (10–14 February 2020): Vick Hope, Gethin Jones, Nicki Chapman and **Tim Vine**
- Week 15 (17–21 February 2020): Gareth Malone, Jamelia, Paul Martin and **Susan Calman**
- Week 16 (24–28 February 2020): Samira Ahmed, **John Robins**, Angela Rippon and Dom Joly
- **House of Champions** Week 3 (2–6 March 2020): Chizzy Akudolu, **Miles Jupp**, Ellie Taylor and Amol Rajan
- **House of Champions** Week 4 (9–13 March 2020): Holly Walsh, **Nish Kumar**, Sarah Greene and Hugh Dennis.

=== Series 4 ===
- Week 1 (12–16 October 2020): Vikki Stone, Ade Adepitan, Jean Johansson and **Stephen Mangan**
- Week 2 (19–23 October 2020): Mike Bushell, Aisling Bea, **Sunetra Sarker** and Dion Dublin
- Week 3 (26–30 October 2020): Scott Mills, Josie d'Arby, Jayde Adams and **Rufus Hound**
- Week 4 (2–6 November 2020): AJ Odudu, **Neil Delamere**, Mark Billingham and Lucy Porter
- Week 5 (9–13 November 2020): Meera Syal, **Steve Backshall**, Catherine Bohart and Ranj Singh
- Week 6 (16–20 November 2020): Melvin Odoom, (Note: This person finished on a negative score during one episode this week.) Denise Van Outen, Greg Rutherford and **Angela Barnes** (Note: This person won all five episodes in the week.) (Note: The equal highest (20) and equal second highest (19) single episode score.)
- Week 7 (23–27 November 2020): Denise Lewis, Rhys James, **Isy Suttie** and David James
- Week 8 (30 November–4 December 2020): Sara Barron, **Rickie Haywood-Williams**, Jessica Fostekew and Anton Du Beke
- Week 9 (7–11 December 2020): Alex Jones, Karim Zeroual, Jessica Knappett and **Robert Rinder**
- Week 10 (14–17 and 20 December 2020): Steve Cram, **Josie Long**, Jeanette Kwakye and Lloyd Griffith
- Week 11 (4–8 January 2021): Gabby Logan, **Tim Key**, Gemma Cairney and Jeff Stelling
- Week 12 (11–15 January 2021): Alex Brooker, Sophie Duker, Charlotte Hawkins and **David Baddiel**
- Week 13 (18–22 January 2021): **Maisie Adam**, Rory Bremner, Michelle Gayle and James Cracknell
- Week 14 (25–29 January 2021): Charlie Brooks, Darren Harriott, **Melinda Messenger** and **Les Dennis** (tie between Messenger and Dennis, were both declared champions)
- Week 15 (1–5 February 2021): Josie Lawrence, Raj Bisram, Laura Whitmore and **Mark Watson**
- Week 16 (8–12 February 2021): Kae Kurd, Zoe Lyons, **Andrew Hunter Murray** and Kate Robbins
- Week 17 (15–19 February 2021): Sindhu Vee, Tom Rosenthal, Anna Richardson and **Marcus Brigstocke**
- Week 18 (22–26 February 2021): **Colin Murray**, Sally Phillips, Nathan Caton and Ronni Ancona
- Week 19 (1–5 March 2021): **Mae Martin**, Nihal Arthanayake, Patsy Kensit and Jake Humphrey
- Week 20 (8–12 March 2021): Glenn Moore, Mina Anwar, Kiri Pritchard-McLean and **Shaun Williamson**

=== Series 5 ===
- Week 1 (16, 18–20, 20 August 2021): Gareth Thomas, **Olga Koch**, Reeta Chakrabarti and Andrew Maxwell
- Week 2 (23–27 August 2021): Jamali Maddix, Jodie Kidd, Suzi Perry and **Hugh Fearnley-Whittingstall**
- Week 3 (30–31 August, 2–3, 3 September 2021): **Joe Thomas**, Lucy Beaumont, Jake Wood and Shazia Mirza
- Week 4 (6–8, 10, 10 September 2021): **Kevin Clifton**, Kemah Bob, Victoria Derbyshire and JJ Chalmers
- Week 5 (13–17 September 2021): Philip Glenister, Thanyia Moore, **Mark Chapman** and Kaye Adams
- Week 6 (20–24 September 2021): Matthew Pinsent, Ruby Bhogal, Ingrid Oliver and **Ed Byrne**
- Week 7 (27 September–1 October 2021): **Cariad Lloyd**, Dennis Taylor, Yasmine Akram and Geoff Norcott
- Week 8 (4–8 October 2021): Jo Brand, Roger Black, Tiff Stevenson and **Sanjeev Kohli**
- Week 9 (11–15 October 2021): Andy Hamilton, Sabrina Grant, Kirsty Wark and **Matt Edmondson**
- Week 10 (18–22 October 2021): Joanne McNally, **Bill Turnbull**, Michelle Collins and Reginald D. Hunter
- Week 11 (25–29 October 2021): Sean Fletcher, Kimberly Wyatt, Louise Minchin and **Chris Washington**
- Week 12 (1–5 November 2021): **Sarah Millican**, Nabil Abdulrashid, Philippa Perry and Luke Kempner
- Week 13 (8–12 November 2021): **Mike Wozniak**, Clare Balding, Mehreen Baig and Jamie Laing
- Week 14 (15–19 November 2021): Will Kirk, Edith Bowman, Fern Brady and **Martin Lewis**
- Week 15 (22–26 November 2021): Athena Kugblenu, Nick Helm, Nina Conti and **Toby Tarrant**
- Week 16 (29 November–3 December 2021): Jessie Cave, AJ Pritchard, Ayesha Hazarika and **Simon Hickson**
- **House of Champions** Week 1 (6–10 December 2021): Vikki Stone, **Sally Phillips**, Rickie Haywood-Williams and Dan Walker
- **House of Champions** Week 2 (13–17 December 2021): Maisie Adam, Dev Griffin, **Ivo Graham** and Zoe Lyons
- **House of Champions** Week 3 (21–25 February 2022): Beattie Edmondson, Adrian Edmondson, Kemah Bob and **Angela Barnes**
- **House of Champions** Week 4 (28 February–4 March 2022): Sara Barron, Gregg Wallace, Sanjeev Kohli and **Josie Long**
- Week 17 (7–11 March 2022): Jennie McAlpine, **Felicity Ward**, Joe Pasquale and Ugo Monye
- Week 18 (14–17, 19 March 2022): Jen Brister, Kelvin Fletcher, Zoe Williams and **Ian Moore**
- Week 19 (21–25 March 2022): Stephen Bailey, Crystelle Pereira, **Amanda Lamb** and Nick Moran
- Week 20 (28 March–1 April 2022): Carol Smillie, Babatunde Aléshé, Richie Anderson and **Jo Caulfield**
- Week 21 (4–8 April 2022): Briony May Williams, Milton Jones, **Ria Lina** and Martin Roberts
- Week 22 (11–15 April 2022): Martel Maxwell, **Mathew Horne**, Chloe Petts and Alex Beresford
- Week 23 (18–22 April 2022): **Kimberley Nixon**, Rachel Fairburn, Trevor Nelson and Des Clarke
- Week 24 (25–29 April 2022): **Jay McGuiness**, Linda Robson, Sarah Kendall and Bobby Seagull

=== Series 6 ===
- Week 1 (5–7 and 9–10 September 2022): Neil Morrissey, Hannah Cockroft, **Rhys Stephenson** and Penny Smith
- Week 2 (12 and 14–17 September 2022): Jayne Middlemiss, Katya Jones, Phil Tufnell and **Rob Deering**
- Week 3 (19–23 September 2022): Martin Offiah, Rebecca Lucy Taylor, Val McDermid and **Charlie Baker**
- Week 4 (26–30 September 2022): **Natasha Raskin Sharp**, Faye Tozer, Eddie Kadi and Charlie Stayt
- Week 5 (3–7 October 2022): **Joe Sugg**, Kerry Howard, Evelyn Mok and Toby Anstis
- Week 6 (10–14 October 2022): Roo Irvine, **Claire Richards**, John Kearns and Diarmuid Gavin
- Week 7 (17–21 October 2022): Louis Emerick, Helen George, **Justin Moorhouse** and Cally Beaton
- **Redemption Week** Week 1 (24–28 October 2022): Darren Harriott, Janet Ellis, Suzi Ruffell and **Radzi Chinyanganya**
- **Redemption Week** Week 2 (31 October–4 November 2022): **Jean Johansson**, Iain Stirling, Sian Gibson and Rav Wilding
- **House of Champions** Week 1 (7–11 November 2022): Laura Whitmore, **Tim Key**, Sunetra Sarker and Jamie Laing
- **House of Champions** Week 2 (14–18 November 2022): Tom Rosenthal, Yasmine Akram, Ingrid Oliver and **Stephen Mangan**
- **House of Champions** Week 3 (21–25 November 2022): Mike Wozniak, Maggie Aderin-Pocock, **Cariad Lloyd** and Gareth Malone
- **House of Champions** Week 4 (28 November–2 December 2022): Stephen Bailey, Ria Lina, Charlie Brooks and **John Thomson**
- Week 8 (5–9 December 2022): Ashley John-Baptiste, Esme Young, Claire Sweeney and **Simon Rimmer**
- Week 9 (12–16 December 2022): John Whaite, Laila Rouass, Sarah Keyworth and **Kevin Eldon**
- Week 10 (2–6 January 2023): Greg McHugh, **Sukh Ojla**, Jayne Sharp and Adrian Chiles
- Week 11 (9–13 January 2023): Jasmine Harman, **Jason Mohammad**, Suzannah Lipscomb and Dave Johns
- Week 12 (16–20 January 2023): **Grace Dent**, Lauren Steadman, Kriss Akabusi and Tim Lovejoy
- Week 13 (23–27 January 2023): Harriet Kemsley, **Laurence Llewelyn-Bowen**, Verona Rose and Jon Culshaw
- Week 14 (30 January–3 February 2023): Kirsten O'Brien, Christine Ohuruogu, **Mike Bubbins** and Kai Widdrington

=== Series 7 ===
- Week 1 (25–29 September 2023): **Ken Bruce**, Perri Shakes-Drayton, **Kiell Smith-Bynoe** and Alice Roberts (tie between Bruce and Smith-Bynoe, were both declared champions)
- Week 2 (2–6 October 2023): Chris Hughes, Toyah Willcox, **Inel Tomlinson** and Debra Stephenson
- Week 3 (9–13 October 2023): James Buckley, **Amy Gledhill**, Romilly Weeks and Gary Wilmot
- Week 4 (16–20 October 2023): Tyler West, **Bonnie Langford**, Charlie Hedges and Myra DuBois
- Week 5 (23–27 October 2023): Lemn Sissay, **Sam Quek**, Kirsty Gallacher and Larry Dean
- Week 6 (30 October–3 November 2023): Max George, **Olly Smith**, Scarlette Douglas and Susie McCabe
- Week 7 (6–10 November 2023): Sinitta, Maisie Smith, **Jimi Famurewa** and William Hanson
- Week 8 (13–17 November 2023): Toussaint Douglass, Sheree Murphy, **Sian Williams** and Mark Foster
- Week 9 (20–24 November 2023): Aurie Styla, Jennie Bond, **James Bye** and Kadeena Cox
- Week 10 (27 November–1 December 2023): **Clive Anderson**, Lutalo Muhammad, Sara Davies and Alison Spittle
- Week 11 (4–8 December 2023): **Malorie Blackman**, Matt Dawson, Chris McCausland and Ranvir Singh
- Week 12 (1–5 January 2024): Jenny Eclair, Dianne Buswell, Owain Wyn Evans and **Adam Gemili**
- Week 13 (8–12 January 2024): Johnny Cochrane, Shobna Gulati, Dermot Murnaghan and **Laura Smyth**
- Week 14 (15–19 January 2024): **Chris Hoy**, Rosie Jones, Ola Labib and Ian "H" Watkins
- Week 15 (22–26 January 2024): Craig Doyle, Tanni Grey-Thompson, **Leo Reich** and Anne-Marie Imafidon
- **Redemption Week** Week 1 (29 January–2 February 2024): Jeff Stelling, **Sophie Duker**, Babatunde Aléshé and Gaby Roslin
- **Redemption Week** Week 2 (5–6 and 8–10 February 2024): **Glenn Moore**, Michael Buerk, Thanyia Moore and Kate Humble
- **House of Champions** Week 1 (12–16 February 2024): Alex Brooker, Isy Suttie, **Kiell Smith-Bynoe** and Kaye Adams
- **House of Champions** Week 2 (19–23 February 2024): Will Kirk, Rachel Parris, Amanda Lamb and **Mark Chapman**
- **House of Champions** Week 3 (26 February–1 March 2024): **Lucy Porter**, Jay McGuiness, Jan Ravens and Nihal Arthanayake

=== Series 8 ===
- Week 1 (23–27 September 2024): Vogue Williams, **Xand van Tulleken**, Michaela Strachan and Ahir Shah
- Week 2 (30 September–4 October 2024): **Laurence Rickard**, (Note: The equal second highest single episode score (19).) Michael Ball, Snoochie Shy and Jodie Prenger
- Week 3 (7–11 October 2024): Jacqui Joseph, **Ben Thompson**, Laura Tobin and Henning Wehn
- Week 4 (14–18 October 2024): Catherine Tyldesley, Anthony Ogogo, Sam Campbell and **Cherry Healey**
- Week 5 (21–25 October 2024): **Emma Sidi**, Alexei Sayle, Kelle Bryan and Antony Costa
- Week 6 (28 October–1 November 2024): **Jordan Banjo**, **Ellie White**, Siân Lloyd and Nick Pickard (tie between Banjo and White, were both declared champions)
- Week 7 (4–8 November 2024): Iwan Thomas, Tessa Sanderson, Deirdre O'Kane and **Jay Rayner**
- Week 8 (11–15 November 2024): Mark Rhodes, Sonia, **Molly Rainford** and Josh Jones
- Week 9 (18–22 November 2024): **Cheryl Baker**, Sophie Willan, Axel Blake and Chris Bavin
- Week 10 (25–29 November 2024): **Nikki Fox**, Ignacio Lopez, Ruthie Henshall and Danny John-Jules
- Week 11 (2–6 December 2024): Ardal O'Hanlon, Josie Gibson, **Adele Roberts** and Simon Armitage
- Week 12 (6–10 January 2025): Helen Skelton, Lara Ricote, Ben Bailey Smith and **Robin Ince**
- Week 13 (13–17 January 2025): Harry Aikines-Aryeetey, Jasmine Takhar, Joe Swash and **Ania Magliano**
- Week 14 (20–24 January 2025): **Danny Miller**, **Phil Daniels**, Nikita Kanda and Eniola Aluko (tie between Miller and Daniels, were both declared champions)
- **Redemption Week** Week 1 (27–31 January 2025): Sally Lindsay, John Kearns, JB Gill and **Fern Britton**
- **Redemption Week** Week 2 (10–14 February 2025): Gary Wilmot, Kate Thornton, Gethin Jones and **Tiff Stevenson**
- Week 15 (3–7 February 2025): Joe Marler, **Tom Read Wilson**, Karen Hauer and Storm Huntley
- Week 16 (17–21 February 2025): Katharine Merry, Danielle Harold, **Robert Webb** (Note: The equal highest single episode score (20).) and Chris Bisson
- **House of Champions** Week 1 (24–28 February 2025): **Rhys James**, Anita Rani, Edith Bowman and Simon Rimmer
- **House of Champions** Week 2 (3–7 March 2025): Jimi Famurewa, Sara Pascoe, Harriet Kemsley and **Colin Murray**

=== Series 9 ===
- Week 1 (29 September–3 October 2025): Melanie Bracewell, **Mark Steel**, Ruth Madeley and Jenny Powell
- Week 2 (6–10 October 2025): **Yinka Bokinni**, Peter Serafinowicz, Vicki Michelle and Ellie Leach
- Week 3 (13–17 October 2025): Jack P. Shepherd, **Joanna Page**, Una Healy and Emmanuel Sonubi
- Week 4 (20–24 October 2025): **John Parrott**, Sheli McCoy, Katie Piper and Kola Bokinni
- Week 5 (27–31 October 2025): **Jack Carroll**, Dani Harmer, Shivi Ramoutar and Dominic Littlewood
- Week 6 (3–7 November 2025): Krishnan Guru-Murthy, Megan McCubbin, **Ashley Storrie** and Adam Woodyatt
- Week 7 (10–14 November 2025): Ria Hebden, Paddy McGuinness, **Vittorio Angelone** and Aimee Fuller
- Week 8 (17–21 November 2025): Stevie Martin, Anna Haugh, Mark Ramprakash and **Andrew Cotter**
- Week 9 (24–28 November 2025): Nathan Bryon, Spencer Matthews, **Rosie Ramsey** and Ruth Langsford
- Week 10 (1–5 December 2025): **Josh Pugh**, Giovanna Fletcher, Montell Douglas and Will Bayley
- Week 11 (5–9 January 2026): Jamie-Lee O'Donnell, Amy Dowden, **Humphrey Ker** and Huge Davies
- Week 12 (12–16 January 2026): Hammed Animashaun, Lorna Watson, **Adam Buxton** and Lisa Snowdon
- Week 13 (19–23 January 2026): Nadia Jae, Tamzin Outhwaite, **Nigel Planer** and Steen Raskopoulos
- Week 14 (26–30 January 2026): Griff Rhys Jones, Tasha Ghouri, Alexandra Mardell and **Jon Kay**
- Week 15 (2–6 February 2026): Lauren Oakley, Mr Motivator, **Patrick Grant**, and Fatiha El-Ghorri
- **Redemption Week** Week 1 (23–27 February 2026): Geoff Norcott, Karen Hauer, Michelle Ackerley and **Katie Derham**
- **Redemption Week** Week 2 (2–6 March 2026): Melvin Odoom, Kimberly Wyatt, **Sarah Keyworth** and Josh Jones
- **House of Champions** Week 1 (9–13 March 2026): Adele Roberts, Olly Smith, **Chris McCausland** and Claire Richards
- **House of Champions** Week 2 (16–19 March 2026): Rachel Riley, **Steve Pemberton**, Sam Quek and Steve Backshall
- **House of Champions** Week 3 (23–27 March 2026): Jacqui Joseph, **Amy Gledhill**, **Tim Vine** and Laurence Llewelyn-Bowen (tie between Gledhill and Vine, were both declared champions)

=== Series 10 ===
- **House of Champions** Week 1 (28 September–2 October 2026): Kiell Smith-Bynoe, Cariad Lloyd, **Lucy Porter**, and Miles Jupp (Richard's final-ever week as host. First ever "Champion of Champion of Champions" week.)
- Week 1 (5–9 October 2026): Shona McGarty, Andi Peters, Nina Wadia and **Stephen Mangan** (Michael Sheen's first week as host.)
- Week 2 (12–16 October 2026): Banjo Beale, **Phillipa Dunne**, Chizzy Akudolu, and Stephen Bailey
- Week 3 (19–23 October 2026): Cheryl Baker, Toby Olubi, Lou Sanders and **Rick Edwards**
- Week 4 (26–30 October 2026): **Lauren Patel**, Jenny Eclair, Les Dennis and Owain Wyn Evans
- Week 5 (2–6 November 2026): Sammi Kinghorn, **Adrian Edmondson**, Rickie Haywood-Williams and Maisie Adam
- Week 6 (9–13 November 2026): Laura Kenny, Seann Walsh, Minah Shannon and **Ricky Wilson**
- Week 7 (16–20 November 2026): Sue Cleaver, Rav Wilding, Rachel Parris and Jake Bhardwaj
- Week 8 (23-27 November 2026): Catherine Bohart, Chesney Hawkes, Rebecca Keatley and Jason Mohammad
- Week 9 (30 November–4 December 2026): Matt Baker, Charley Marlowe, Rose Matafeo and Jack Rooke

=== Festive ===
Festive Series 1

- Week 1 (19–23 December 2022): Ivo Graham, **Clare Balding**, Su Pollard and Ugo Monye
- Week 2 (26–30 December 2022): Brian Conley, **Scarlett Moffatt**, **Anneka Rice** and Phil Wang (tie between Moffatt and Rice, were both declared champions)

Festive Series 2

- Week 1 (18–22 December 2023): **Jessica Knappett**, Richie Anderson, Debbie McGee and Simon Gregson
- Week 2 (26–30 December 2023): Harry Judd, Gbemisola Ikumelo, **Hugh Dennis** and Kerry Godliman

Festive Series 3

- Week 1 (23–24, 26–27 and 29 December 2024): **Jim Howick**, Susan Wokoma, Rebecca Lucy Taylor and Matt Morsia
- Week 2 (30 December 2024–3 January 2025): Jennie McAlpine, **Jon Richardson**, Desiree Burch and Gareth Malone

Festive Series 4

- Week 1 (22–24, 26 and 28 December 2025): Mel Giedroyc, Charles Venn, **Mathew Baynton** and Harriet Kemsley
- Week 2 (29 December 2025–2 January 2026): Joanna Page, Rhys Darby, Molly Rainford and **Alex Brooker**

== Transmissions ==
Series	Presenter	Episodes	Start date	End date
1	Richard Osman	15	4 September 2017	22 September 2017
2	Richard Osman	50	28 May 2018	14 December 2018
3	Richard Osman	100	7 October 2019	13 March 2020
4	Richard Osman	100	12 October 2020	12 March 2021
5	Richard Osman	140	16 August 2021	29 April 2022
6	Richard Osman	100	5 September 2022	3 February 2023
7	Richard Osman	100	25 September 2023	1 March 2024
8	Richard Osman	100	23 September 2024	7 March 2025
9	Richard Osman	100	29 September 2025	27 March 2026
10	Richard Osman	5	28 September 2026	2 October 2026
10	Michael Sheen	90	5 October 2026	TBA

== Spin-offs ==
=== Richard Osman's House of Games Night ===
On 20 November 2020, Osman launched a five-episode spin-off called Richard Osman's House of Games Night, broadcast weekly in primetime on BBC One. A one-episode Christmas Special aired on 28 December 2020. A second series, consisting of six episodes, began on 1 October 2021.

The series follows the exact same format as the main show, but with the addition of rounds not seen in the original. There are no double points in the final episode. Series 2 features a house band led by David O'Doherty. In 2022, House of Games Night was cancelled after two series.

==== Transmissions ====
Series	Start date	End date	Episodes
1	20 November 2020	18 December 2020	5
Christmas Special	28 December 2020		1
2	1 October 2021	5 November 2021	6

==== Contestants ====
- Series 1: Jennifer Saunders, Jermaine Jenas, Roisin Conaty and Jason Manford
- Christmas Special: Sarah Hadland, Alex Horne, Charlene White and Craig Revel Horwood
- Series 2, Group 1: Ed Gamble, Sian Gibson, Dara Ó Briain and Sindhu Vee
- Series 2, Group 2: Steph McGovern, Ben Miller, Janette Manrara and Ed Balls (tie between McGovern and Balls)

== Merchandise ==
On 17 October 2019 BBC Books, an imprint of Penguin Random House, published Richard Osman's House of Games: 101 new & classic games from the hit BBC series, a quizbook written by Osman and Alan Connor based on the programme.

== International versions ==
Country	Name	Host(s)	TV station	Premiere	Finale	Ref
Australia	Claire Hooper's House of Games	Claire Hooper	ABC TV	21 April 2025	27 June 2025	
