= A Place in the Sun (British TV series) =

British TV series (2000–)

- Directed by: Various
- Presented by: Various (see below)
- Country of origin: United Kingdom
- Original language: English
- No. of series: 12 (A Place in the Sun); 4 (By the Sea); 13 (Home or Away?); 7 (Winter Sun) (Home or USA); 6 (Summer Sun); 41 (total)
- No. of episodes: 477 (A Place in the Sun); 309 (Home or Away); 82 (Summer Sun); 179 (to date) (Winter Sun); 1047 (total)

Production
- Producer: Various
- Running time: 60 minutes (inc. adverts)
- Production company: Freeform Productions

Original release
- Network: Channel 4
- Release: 11 September 2000 – present

Related
- A Place in the Sun: By the Sea; A Place in the Sun: Home or Away? A Place in the Sun: Winter Sun; A Place in the Sun: Summer Sun; A Place in the Sun: Home or USA?

A Place in the Sun is a British Channel 4 lifestyle television series about attempting to find a "perfect property" on the market in the United Kingdom, overseas, and "abroad". It most often focuses on areas in southern Europe, but in recent years, it has also featured a number of places in other areas of the world such as Florida and the Caribbean.

== Format ==
Generally, every episode on the programme shows a British couple wishing to buy a property in a sunny foreign country being shown three to five properties within their budget which have been found by the show's researchers. The presenter gives the couple useful local information relating to buying, running and maintaining a property in this particular location. After viewing each property the couple are asked for their opinions. At the end of the show they are asked if they have a favourite property and we're finally told if they went on to buy the property or another in the region. It was a response to the growth in Britons buying property abroad.

In the last few years, it has shown destinations as diverse as Australia, Bulgaria, Canada, the Caribbean, Croatia, Romania, Slovenia, South Africa, and even Cape Verde.

== Presenters ==
A Place in the Sun: Home or Away? / Winter Sun / Summer Sun / Home or USA? / What Happened Next?

- Jonnie Irwin (2004–2021)
- Jasmine Harman (2004–present)
- Laura Hamilton (2012–present)
- Sara Damergi (2012–2015, 2021–present)
- Luke Doonan (2012–2013)
- Adrian Simpson (2014–2015)
- Scarlette Douglas (2015–2022)
- Ben Hillman (2015–present)
- Danni Menzies (2016–2026)
- Jean Johansson (2018–present)
- Lee Juggurnauth (2021–present)
- Leah Charles-King (2021–present)
- Craig Rowe (2022–present)
- Lucy Alexander (2023–present)

A Place in the Sun: Summer Sun / By the Sea

- Amanda Lamb (2001–2009, 2024)
- Seetha Hallett (2005–2011)
- Simone Bienne (2006)
- Victoria Hollingsworth (2004–2007)
- Bella Crane (2003)
- Fay Davies (2000)
- Zilpah Hartley (2000)

== Spin-offs ==
Spin-offs include the website featuring news, features, advice and the opportunity to search 30,000 overseas properties for sale and for holiday rental, a magazine, which is now the most popular magazine advising on buying overseas property, and live exhibitions per year in London, Birmingham, Manchester, Dublin and previously in Glasgow, called A Place in the Sun Live, since 2005. The most recent A Place in the Sun Live overseas property exhibition took place at Excel London between 8–10 May 2026.

There have also been a number of spin-off television programmes, including:

- A Place in France (2002)
- A Place in Greece (2004) and A Place in Greece: Year 2 (2005)
- A Place in Spain (2004) and A Place in Spain: Year 2 (2005)
- A Place in Slovakia (2005) with its sequel Chaos at the Chateau in 2007
- A Place in Spain: Costa Chaos (2007). Unrelated to the previous A Place in Spain series
- A Place in the Sun: What Happened Next (2024–) following the couples and families whose lives have changed since appearing on the programme
- Jasmine Harman's My Renovation in the Sun (2025-) follows presenter Jasmine Harman, her husband and two children who have relocated to Southern Spain and took on a renovation project to become their forever home. Narrated by Peter Dalton.

== Sister shows ==
- A Place in the Sun: By the Sea (2005–2011) which looks at buying property in coastal areas of the UK, presented by Seetha Hallett.
- A Place in the Sun: Home or Away? (2004–2019) in which people view properties both in the UK and in a foreign country, presented by Jasmine Harman (2004–19), Jonnie Irwin (2004–19), Laura Hamilton (2012–19), Sara Damergi (2013–15), Adrian Simpson (2015), Scarlette Douglas (2017) and Ben Hillman (2017–19).
- A Million Pound Place in the Sun (2007–2009) in this special programme, prospective buyers find luxury homes, exploring some of the most desirable locations on the European market. presented by Amanda Lamb
- A Place in the Sun: Summer Sun (2012–2017) presented by Sara Damergi (2012–15), Laura Hamilton (2015–2017), Scarlette Douglas (2015–17), Jasmine Harman (2015–17), Ben Hillman (2015–17) and Danni Menzies (2016-17).
- A Place in the Sun: Winter Sun (2012–2018) presented by Jasmine Harman (2012–18), Jonnie Irwin (2012–18), Laura Hamilton (2012–18), Sara Damergi (2014–15), Adrian Simpson (2014), Scarlette Douglas (2015–18), Ben Hillman (2015–18) and Danni Menzies (2016–18).
- A Place in the Sun: Home or USA (2003–2014) presented by Sara Damergi, Jasmine Harman, Jonnie Irwin, Laura Hamilton, Zilpah Hartley and Seetha Hallett.
