= Jay Blades =

English furniture restorer and television presenter

Jay Blades MBE
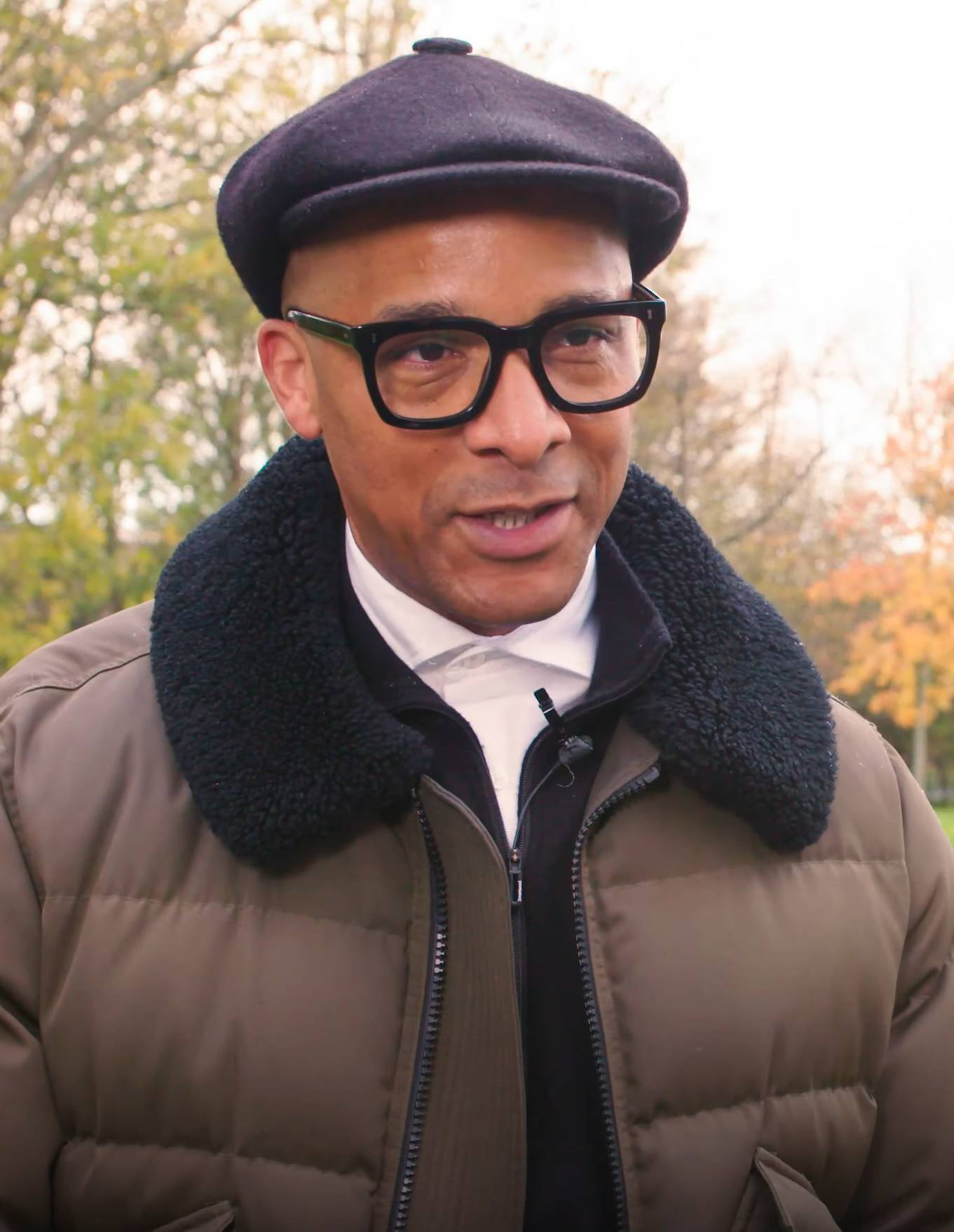
- Born: Jason Blades; 21 February 1970 (age 56); Brent, London, England
- Occupation: Furniture restorer • television personality
- Years active: 2017–present
- Known for: The Repair Shop; Money for Nothing; Jay Blades' Home Fix
- Spouse(s): Jade (divorced) Lisa Zbozen (m. 2022; sep. 2024)
- Children: 3

Jason Blades (born 21 February 1970) is an English furniture restorer and television presenter.

== Early life ==
Blades was born in Brent, North-West London and raised in Hackney, East London with his mother and maternal half-brother. As an adult, he learned that his father had 25 other children, from different mothers, in a number of countries. He has dyslexia, which was not diagnosed at school. He says that he experienced racism at school and from the police. In September 2022, Blades appeared on BBC Radio 4's Desert Island Discs and said that his childhood had been "blighted by racism and violence".

As a young man, he worked as a labourer and in factories. He later enrolled at Buckinghamshire New University as a mature student to study criminology. It was only then, aged 31, that he was diagnosed with the reading ability of an 11-year old.

During the early 2010s, roughly between 2012 and 2013, Blades was involved in the running of a children's club known as "Men Behaving Dadly", a weekend playgroup aimed at young children and their fathers. It took place at Bedfont and Chiswick children's centres.

== Career ==
Blades and his then wife, Jade, set up a charity based in High Wycombe, Out of the Dark, to train disadvantaged young people in furniture restoration. The charity lost funding, their marriage broke down, and he became homeless. He was supported by friends and by the Caribbean community. Around the same time, television producers saw a short film about the charity which led to his work as a presenter. He moved to Wolverhampton and established Jay & Co, a social enterprise to support disadvantaged and disengaged groups.

In 2021, Blades became trustee of a charity founded by singer Leigh-Anne Pinnock, The Black Fund. They had met years previously when Blades ran a youth club and choir which Pinnock, then 14 years old, joined.

He also released a memoir in that year, entitled Making It: How Love, Kindness and Community Helped Me Repair My Life, published by Pan Macmillan UK.

Blades was appointed co-chair of the Heritage Crafts Association in August 2022.

=== Television ===
Blades is best known for presenting The Repair Shop, Money for Nothing and Jay Blades' Home Fix, and co-presenting Jay and Dom's Home Fix.

He has also appeared on Celebrity Masterchef, Richard Osman's House of Games, Would I Lie to You?, The Wheel, and The Graham Norton Show.

In August 2021, Blades filmed a documentary programme for BBC One, Jay Blades: Learning to Read at 51, depicting his recent attempts, with the support of the charity Read Easy UK, to improve his literacy. He danced with Luba Mushtuk in the 2021 Strictly Come Dancing Christmas Special.

In May 2022 he appeared in a three-part series on Channel 5 revisiting the area he grew up in, and interviewing childhood friends, experts, and witnesses to history. Jay Blades: No Place Like Home featured locations such as Ridley Road Market (the history of anti-fascist action in the 1940s), Newington Green Unitarian Church (slavery and abolitionism), the Pellici cafe (the Kray twins and gangsterism), and the site of the First World War bombing by airship.

In October 2022, Blades was the lead presenter for the edition of The Repair Shop which featured King Charles III.

In June 2023, Channel 4 commissioned Britain’s Best Beach Huts, which Blades co-presented with Laura Jackson. The series aired during June and July 2023. Also in June 2023, Blades presented Jay Blades' East End Through Time; a three-part documentary series shown on Channel 5, which was followed by The Midlands Through Time in October.

During early 2024, Blades and Sir David Jason presented David & Jay's Touring Toolshed; a fifteen-part restoration series on BBC Two. During June 2024, Channel 5 aired Jay Blades: The West End Through Time; a sequel to Jay Blades' East End Through Time. In July 2024, it was reported that Blades was to present Jay Blades: A Country House Through Time (working title), an upcoming four-part Channel 5 documentary series. In August 2024, Blades featured with Dame Judi Dench in a Channel 4 programme called Dame Judi and Jay: The Odd Couple.

== Personal life ==
Blades lives in Claverley, Shropshire, having previously lived in Ironbridge. He has a daughter from his first marriage and two sons from previous relationships. Blades married his second wife, Lisa Zbozen, in Barbados in November 2022. In May 2024, the couple separated.

In May 2024, Blades said that his uncle, Richard Brathwaite, had been killed. In a social media post, he said his uncle's death had "really affected" him and announced a break from social media. He told The Independent he was planning to seek counselling.

=== Legal issues ===
In September 2024, Blades was charged with controlling and coercive behaviour against Lisa Zbozen, including physical and emotional abuse.

Blades appeared at Worcester Crown Court on 11 October 2024 and entered a not guilty plea. He remained prohibited from approaching or contacting his wife under an existing exclusion order.

In early August 2025, Blades was additionally charged with two counts of rape, relating to separate incidents between 2022 and 2024. On 10 September 2025, he appeared via videolink at Shrewsbury Crown Court and pleaded not guilty to both charges. A trial is scheduled for September 2027.

== Honours ==
Blades was appointed Member of the Order of the British Empire (MBE) in the 2021 Birthday Honours, for services to craft.

In May 2022, it was announced that Blades would be appointed as the first Chancellor of Buckinghamshire New University. At his formal investiture in March 2023, the university awarded him an honorary degree "for his significant contribution to furniture-making and crafts and community work". Blades resigned from the position in September 2024.

== Books ==
- Making It: How Love, Kindness and Community Helped Me Repair My Life (Bluebird Books, 2021) ISBN 9781529059199
- DIY with Jay: How to Repair and Refresh Your Home (Bluebird Books, 2022) ISBN 9781529091281
- Life Lessons: Wisdom and Wit from Life's Ups and Downs (Bluebird Books, 2023) ISBN 9781035010110
