= Jonatan Johansson (footballer) =

Finnish footballer and coach (born 1975)

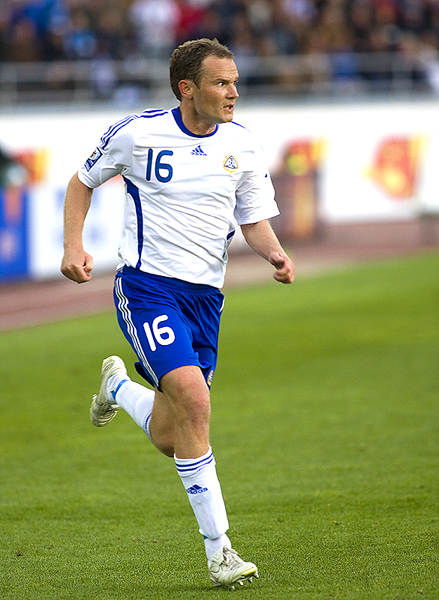
- Johansson playing for Finland in 2009

Personal information
- Full name: Jonatan Lillebror Johansson
- Date of birth: 16 August 1975 (age 51)
- Place of birth: Stockholm, Sweden
- Height: 1.85 m (6 ft 1 in)
- Position: Forward

Senior career*
Years	Team	Apps	(Gls)
1993–1995	PIF	49	(13)
1995–1997	TPS	32	(6)
1997	Flora	9	(9)
1997–2000	Rangers	47	(14)
2000–2006	Charlton Athletic	148	(27)
2006	→ Norwich City (loan)	12	(3)
2006–2008	Malmö FF	55	(23)
2009	Hibernian	9	(0)
2009–2010	St Johnstone	6	(1)
2010–2011	TPS	19	(10)
Total		372	(95)

International career
1996–2010	Finland	106	(22)

Managerial career
- 2012: Greenock Morton (U20)
- 2012–2015: Motherwell U20
- 2016–2017: Finland (assistant)
- 2017–2018: Rangers (assistant)
- 2018–2019: Greenock Morton
- 2020–2022: TPS
- 2023–: Rangers (academy coach)
- * Club domestic league appearances and goals

Jonatan Lillebror Johansson (born 16 August 1975) is a Finnish football coach and former player. He is working as an academy coach for Rangers.

His main position was forward, playing most notably for Rangers and Charlton Athletic. Johansson was also a regular in the Finland national team, earning 106 caps.

He was inducted into the Finnish Football Hall of Fame in 2019.

== Club career ==
=== Early career ===
Johansson was born in Stockholm, Sweden, and started his career in Finland with his hometown club PIF. In 1995, he moved on to the Veikkausliiga club TPS. In 1997, he transferred to Flora, becoming the first Finnish player to move to an Estonian club. The fee for transfer was reportedly 170.000 Finnish markka, which corresponds to around €30.000.

In 1997, he moved to Scotland to join Rangers for a transfer fee of £300,000.

Johansson signed for newly promoted English Premier League club Charlton Athletic in the summer of 2000, for a fee of around £3.75 million (€5.6 million). He competed for a place up front with Shaun Bartlett, Kevin Lisbie and Jason Euell.

On 31 January 2006, having fallen out of contention at The Valley, Johansson was loaned to Championship side Norwich City as a replacement for Dean Ashton. He scored his first goal on 5 February to open an East Anglian derby at home to Ipswich Town, a 2–1 loss.

Johansson and fellow out-of-favour forwards Bartlett and Francis Jeffers were released by Charlton in May 2006. In July he signed with Swedish club Malmö FF until 2008.

=== Hibernian ===
On 13 November 2008, Johansson signed a pre-contract agreement with Scottish Premier League side Hibernian. He agreed an 18-month contract with Hibs, after his contract with Malmö FF expired. Johansson was unable to sign until 1 January, due to the transfer window rules, but began training in December. He made his debut on 3 January 2009 against Hearts in the Edinburgh derby. Johansson scored his first goal seven months after signing at East End Park against Dunfermline Athletic in a 4–0 friendly win, but he was expected to leave Hibernian due to the increased competition for places. His departure was confirmed on 1 September 2009.

=== St Johnstone ===
It only became apparent that Johansson had signed for St Johnstone on 27 October 2009 when he was named in the starting line-up for their Scottish League Cup quarter-final tie at home to Dundee United. He had previously been training with the club to maintain his fitness ahead of Finland's international matches earlier in the month. Johansson signed a short-term contract until the new year. He scored a winning goal against Hearts on 21 November, which was his first competitive goal in Scotland for ten years, St Johnstone did not renew his short-term contract and Johansson left the club.

Greenock Morton and an unnamed German club made Johansson contract offers, but Johansson rejected Morton's offer.

=== Return to TPS ===
On 8 February 2010, Johansson returned to TPS Turku after spending 14 years abroad. He scored his first goal (a penalty kick) in a Veikkausliga game against VPS Vaasa on 7 May. He also scored twice in the next match, against Inter Turku, in the city's local derby. He also won the 2010 Finnish Cup, 2–0 against HJK Helsinki in the final. He finished the season with 10 goals, being the club's second best goalscorer, only two goals behind Roope Riski. Johansson announced his retirement from professional football on 23 March 2011.

== International career ==
Johansson made his debut for the Finland national team on 16 March 1996 against Kuwait, scoring the game's only goal. He was a regular member of the Finland squad and earned his 100th cap in October 2009. Johansson made a total of 106 appearances for Finland and scored 22 goals. Only Jari Litmanen and Teemu Pukki have made more appearances for Finland than Johansson. As of October 2021, Johansson is fourth in goals scored for Finland, after Pukki, Litmanen and Mikael Forssell.

After scoring the opening goal in a 2010 FIFA World Cup Qualifying match against Wales, Johansson was the subject of verbal criticism by Craig Bellamy.

== Coaching career ==
Johansson worked for Greenock Morton as their reserve team coach in 2012. He moved to Motherwell in August 2012 to coach their under-20 team. Johansson left Motherwell in July 2015 and was replaced by Stephen Craigan. In December 2016, he was appointed as an assistant coach to Markku Kanerva for the Finland national team.

On 9 April 2017, he was announced as an assistant coach to Rangers manager Pedro Caixinha. After starting work with Rangers, Johansson left his position with the Finland national team.

=== Greenock Morton ===
Johansson was appointed on a two-year contract as manager of Scottish Championship club Greenock Morton on 6 September 2018. His first match in charge ended in a 1–1 draw at Tannadice Park against Dundee United. Johansson left Morton at the end of the 2018–19 season, as the club decided not to exercise the option of retaining him for the second year of his contract.

=== TPS ===
Johansson was appointed as new manager at TPS on 24 July 2020. He signed an initial two-year contract with the option of another year. He was dismissed by TPS on 25 September 2022.

== Personal life ==
Johansson married Jean Anderson, a Scottish television presenter who is from Port Glasgow, in June 2008.

== Career statistics ==
=== Club ===
Appearances and goals by club, season and competition
Club	Season	League			National Cup		League Cup		Europe		Total	
Club	Season	Division	Apps	Goals	Apps	Goals	Apps	Goals	Apps	Goals	Apps	Goals
TPS	1995	Veikkausliiga	9	0	6	0	0	0	2	0	17	0
TPS	1996	Veikkausliiga	23	6	0	0	0	0	0	0	23	6
TPS	Total		32	6	6	0	0	0	2	0	40	6
Flora Tallinn	1996–97	Meistriliiga	9	9	0	0	0	0	0	0	9	9
Rangers	1997–98	Scottish Premier League	6	0	2	0	0	0	1	0	8	0
Rangers	1998–99	Scottish Premier League	25	8	3	3	2	1	7	5	37	18
Rangers	1999–2000	Scottish Premier League	16	6	0	0	2	0	8	1	26	7
Rangers	Total		47	14	5	3	4	1	16	6	71	25
Charlton Athletic	2000–01	Premier League	31	11	0	0	2	3	1	0	34	14
Charlton Athletic	2001–02	Premier League	30	5	2	0	2	0	0	0	34	5
Charlton Athletic	2002–03	Premier League	31	3	2	2	1	0	0	0	34	3
Charlton Athletic	2003–04	Premier League	26	4	1	0	2	0	0	0	29	4
Charlton Athletic	2004–05	Premier League	26	4	3	0	2	0	0	0	29	4
Charlton Athletic	2005–06	Premier League	4	0	2	1	0	0	0	0	6	1
Charlton Athletic	Total		148	27	10	3	9	3	1	0	168	33
Norwich City (loan)	2005–06	Championship	12	3	0	0	0	0	0	0	12	3
Malmö FF	2006	Allsvenskan	14	11	0	0	0	0	0	0	14	11
Malmö FF	2007	Allsvenskan	21	6	0	0	0	0	0	0	21	6
Malmö FF	2008	Allsvenskan	20	6	0	0	0	0	0	0	20	6
Malmö FF	Total		55	23	0	0	0	0	0	0	55	23
Hibernian	2008–09	Scottish Premier League	9	0	1	0	0	0	0	0	10	0
St Johnstone	2009–10	Scottish Premier League	6	1	1	0	0	0	0	0	6	1
TPS	2010	Veikkausliiga	19	10	0	0	0	0	0	0	0	0
Career total			337	93	23	6	13	4	19	6	392	109

=== International goals ===
Scores and results list Finland's goal tally first, score column indicates score after each Johansson goal.

List of international goals scored by Jonatan Johansson
No.	Date	Venue	Opponent	Score	Result	Competition
1	16 March 1996	Kuwait City, Kuwait	Kuwait		1–0	Friendly
2	5 February 1998	Limassol, Cyprus	Cyprus		1–1	Friendly
3	22 April 1998	Edinburgh, Scotland	Scotland		1–1	Friendly
4	5 September 1998	Helsinki, Finland	Moldova		3–2	UEFA Euro 2000 qualifying
5	14 October 1998	Istanbul, Turkey	Turkey		3–1	UEFA Euro 2000 qualifying
6	10 February 1999	Ta'Qali, Malta	Poland		1–1	Friendly
7	18 August 1999	Bruges, Belgium	Belgium		4–3	Friendly
8	18 August 1999	Bruges, Belgium	Belgium		4–3	Friendly
9	9 October 1999	Helsinki, Finland	Northern Ireland		4–1	UEFA Euro 2000 qualifying
10	30 April 2003	Vantaa, Finland	Iceland		3–0	Friendly
11	8 February 2005	Nicosia, Greece	Latvia		2–1	Friendly
12	26 March 2005	Teplice, Czech Republic	Czech Republic		3–4	2006 FIFA World Cup qualification
13	6 September 2006	Helsinki, Finland	Portugal		1–1	UEFA Euro 2008 qualifying
14	6 June 2007	Helsinki, Finland	Belgium		2–0	UEFA Euro 2008 qualifying
15	20 August 2008	Tampere, Finland	Israel		2–0	Friendly
16	20 August 2008	Tampere, Finland	Israel		2–0	Friendly
17	10 September 2008	Helsinki, Finland	Germany		3–3	2010 FIFA World Cup qualification
18	28 March 2009	Cardiff, Wales	Wales		2–0	2010 FIFA World Cup qualification
19	1 April 2009	Oslo, Norway	Norway		2–3	Friendly
20	6 June 2009	Helsinki, Finland	Liechtenstein		2–1	2010 FIFA World Cup qualification
21	5 September 2009	Lankaran, Azerbaijan	Azerbaijan		2–1	2010 FIFA World Cup qualification
22	14 October 2009	Hamburg, Germany	Germany		1–1	2010 FIFA World Cup qualification

=== Managerial ===
As of 9 January 2025

Team	Nat	From	To	Record				
Team	Nat	From	To	P	W	D	L	W%
Greenock Morton	(Scotland)	6 September 2018	4 May 2019	34	9	13	12	26.5
TPS	(Finland)	27 July 2020	25 September 2022	82	39	20	23	47.6
Total				116	48	33	35	41.4

== See also ==
- List of men's footballers with 100 or more international caps
