= Jean Johansson =

Scottish television presenter and property expert

Jean Johansson (born Anderson) is a Scottish television presenter and property expert.

== Early life ==
Johansson was born Jean Anderson to father John Anderson (who hails from Kirkcaldy) and mother Edinasi (usually known as Winnie, who hails from Kampala). She was born in Kisii, Kenya in 1980 and is the second youngest of seven children. Her family relocated to Port Glasgow where she attended the local school before moving on to Paisley University (now University of the West of Scotland).

== TV ==
Johansson is best known for her work as a presenter on A Place in the Sun. Johansson has also made celebrity appearances on Pointless, House of Games and Mastermind, as well as Celebrity MasterChef.

== Fronting a Historic Environment Scotland campaign ==
Historic Environment Scotland have selected Johansson to head their "Take the Slow Road" campaign, which encourages tourists to visit lesser known attractions in Scotland. In an interview with The Scotsman newspaper, she is quoted as saying that she joined the Lowland route, highlighting Caerlaverock Castle and further stating ""These new routes are perfect for building a trip that feels relaxed, rewarding and shine a light on brilliant places and people you might otherwise bypass. Forget the high road, this is your chance to 'Take the Slow Road'.""

== Personal life ==
In 2008, Johansson wed Jonatan Johansson, a Finnish football coach and former player. They share one son, Junior.

She lives in Ayrshire.
