= Lesley Joseph =

English actress and broadcaster (born 1945)

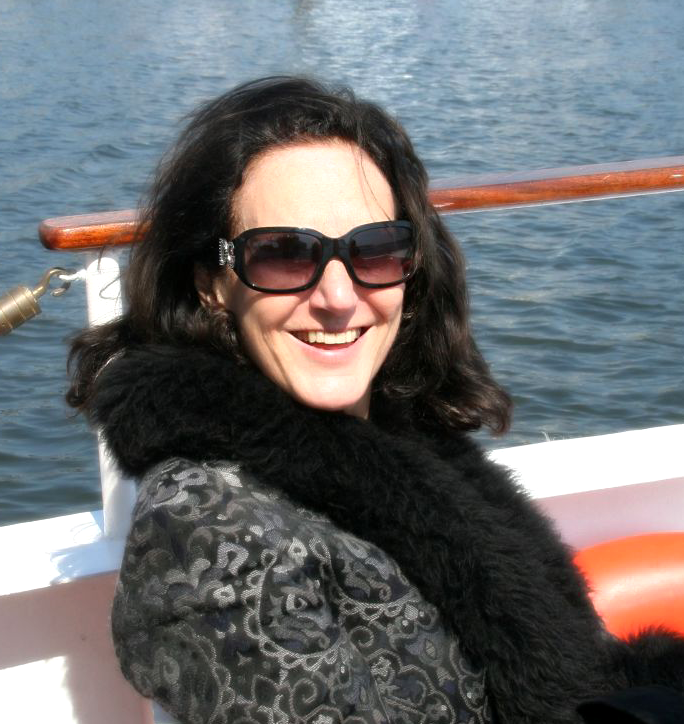
- Joseph in 2011
- Born: Lesley Diana Joseph; 14 October 1945 (age 81); Finsbury Park, London, England
- Occupations: Actress; broadcaster
- Years active: 1964–present
- Television: Birds of a Feather; Night and Day; Strictly Come Dancing
- Height: 5 ft 2 in (1.57 m)
- Children: 2

Lesley Diana Joseph (born 14 October 1945) is an English actress and broadcaster, whose career on stage and screen spans over sixty years. She is best known for portraying the role of Dorien Green in the television sitcom Birds of a Feather from 1989 to 1998 and again from 2014 to 2020. Other television credits include Absurd Person Singular (1985) and Night and Day (2001–2003).

Her stage roles include UK touring productions of Thoroughly Modern Millie (2005), Calendar Girls (2011), Annie (2015) and Sister Act: The Musical (2022–2024). She was also a contestant on the fourteenth series of Strictly Come Dancing in 2016 and won the seventh series of Celebrity Coach Trip in 2022. In 2018, she was nominated for the Olivier Award for Best Supporting Actress in a Musical, for the original West End production of Young Frankenstein.

== Early life ==
Lesley Diana Joseph was born on 14 October 1945 in Finsbury Park, Haringey, London, England to Rebecca (née Mundy; 1912–2016) and Jack Joseph. She had an older brother Robin, two years her senior. She grew up in Kingsthorpe, Northampton and attended Northampton School for Girls. Joseph is Jewish.

== Career ==
=== Stage ===
Joseph hosting A Breath of Fresh Air by the Chiltern Shakespeare Society in June 2008.

Joseph made her stage debut in 1964, appearing as Hermia in a production of A Midsummer Night's Dream at Abington Park Museum, Northampton. She appeared in the same play four years later as Titania with the Royal Shakespeare Company. In May 1973, Joseph appeared in Godspell at the Pavilion Theatre, Bournemouth. In 1981, she appeared as Edith Piaf in Piaf at the Belgrade Theatre. Joseph went on to appear in multiple productions of Cinderella, Dick Whittington and Snow White and the Seven Dwarfs throughout her career.

In 2004, she appeared as Evy Meara in a tour of The Gingerbread Lady. She also performed in the UK tour of The Vagina Monologues, and again in 2006. In 2011, Joseph appeared as Chris in the stage show Calendar Girls, based on the film of the same name. She returned to the stage show eight years later in the role of Jessie. In 2014, Joseph starred as Myra Wilson in the UK Tour of Hot Flush!.

In 2015, Joseph appeared as Miss Hannigan in the stage production of Annie at certain venues, sharing the role with Jodie Prenger, Elaine C Smith and Craig Revel Horwood. In 2017, Joseph portrayed Frau Blucher in the West End production of Young Frankenstein.

Between 2022 and 2024, Joseph starred in Sister Act: The Musical, playing the roles of Sister Mary Lazarus and Mother Superior. Between 2024 and 2025, she appeared as Grandma in the UK tour of The Addams Family. In 2026, she appeared as Molly in Road.

=== Birds of a Feather ===
From 1989 to 1998, Joseph starred as Dorien Green in the BBC One sitcom Birds of a Feather. Joseph's character was the wealthy, snobbish, man-eating neighbour of Sharon Theodopolopodous (Pauline Quirke) and Tracey Stubbs (Linda Robson), a middle-aged woman who strives to create the impression that she is a glamorous beauty, dressing in a sexually provocative style, preferring mini-skirts, high heels and leopard print. Dorien was married to an accountant, Marcus, but frequently engaged in affairs with other men.

In December 2011, it was confirmed that Joseph would reunite with fellow Birds of a Feather cast members, Quirke and Robson, for a theatre adaptation of the series. The trio toured the United Kingdom from May to July 2012.

Following the success of the stage adaption, a new series of Birds of a Feather was commissioned after the rights had been acquired by ITV. The new series began airing on 2 January 2014 for eight episodes. To promote the return of the series, Joseph, Quirke and Robson appeared as guest panellists on Loose Women on 16 January 2014.

In March 2015, it was confirmed that a second series of Birds of a Feather had been commissioned by ITV which began airing in December. Following this, a third series was commissioned and aired in early 2016, Joseph appeared in three more Christmas specials airing in 2016, 2017 and 2020 respectively, before the show's cancellation was announced in May 2021.

=== Other television work ===
Joseph starred in the ITV soap Night and Day from 2001 to 2003 playing the show's resident bitch, Rachel Culgrin. In 2002, Joseph appeared on a special edition of What Not to Wear, where she was given a makeover by Trinny Woodall and Susannah Constantine.

In 2009, she became a regular newspaper reviewer on This Morning. She appeared in the 2014 series Secrets of the Asylum, a two-part series for ITV. In 2015, Joseph took part in ITV's celebrity sheep herding series Flockstars.

In 2014, Joseph appeared with Forrest Dunbar on ITV2's Freshers: A Year On. She made frequent appearances on Channel 5's Big Brother's Bit on the Side. In August 2016, it was announced that Joseph would take part in the fourteenth series of Strictly Come Dancing. She was partnered with Anton Du Beke. In their first week, the couple scored 23 points for their waltz to "What'll I Do", in week two, 26 for their cha-cha-cha to "Perhaps, Perhaps, Perhaps", in week three, 27 for their quickstep for "A Couple of Swells" from Easter Parade and in week four, 31 for their Charleston to "Won't You Charleston with Me?" from The Boy Friend. They were the fourth couple to be eliminated from the series in week five, after scoring 24 for their tango to "Whatever Lola Wants" and losing the dance off to Daisy Lowe and Aljaž Škorjanec.

In 2019, Joseph appeared on the BBC series Pilgrimage: Road to Rome. She was one of the four competitors who appeared in the special Christmas edition of The Great British Sewing Bee that was transmitted on New Year's Eve 2020 on BBC One. Her fellow competitors in the programme were Sabrina Grant, Sally Phillips and The Vivienne.

In 2022, Joseph won the seventh series of Celebrity Coach Trip alongside her Birds of a Feather co-star Linda Robson. The same year, she appeared as a contestant on the seventeenth series of Celebrity MasterChef. In 2024, she appeared on an episode of Celebrity Gogglebox for Stand Up to Cancer alongside Miriam Margolyes. In 2026, Joseph appeared as Tilly Webster in an episode of The Good Ship Murder, alongside Robson and was a contestant on the sixth series of Cooking with the Stars, where she was the third contestant to be eliminated.

=== Radio ===
Joseph began presenting a radio show in 2008 on BBC London 94.9 with Christopher Biggins, airing every Sunday between 9 am to 12 noon. Biggins left the show after a few months; however, Joseph has continued to host. She also stood in for Vanessa Feltz on her weekday morning talk show whilst Feltz was on holiday.

== Personal life ==
Joseph lives in London. She has two children, a son and a daughter, from a relationship with Carl Littlejohn.

== Filmography ==
Year	Title	Role	Notes
1969	The Bastard King	Catherine of Braganza	Supporting role
1974	And Mother Makes Five	Gypsy woman	Supporting role
1975	Sadie, It's Cold Outside	Cashier	1 episode
1979	The Knowledge	Val	Supporting role
1980	Minder	Maureen	1 episode
1981	Roots	Melanie Goldblatt	1 episode
1983	Number 10	Rose Rosenburg	Recurring role
1985	Summer Season	Mrs King	Recurring role
1985	Absurd Person Singular	Lottie Potter	TV film
1986	The Ballad of Johnny Vanguard	Secretary	TV pilot
1987	First Sight	Pippa	Main role
1988	Les Girls	Shop assistant	Recurring role
1989	Ruth Rendell Mysteries	Rose Farriner's neighbour	Main role
1989–1998, 2014–2020	Birds of a Feather	Dorien Green	Main role
1992	Celebrity Squares	Herself	Contestant
1992	Celebrity Fifteen to One	Herself	Contestant
1995	Rumble	Ma Pecs	Supporting role
1996	Spywatch	Miss Millington	Main role
1998	Macbeth	Witch	TV film
2001–2003	Night and Day	Rachel Culgrin	Regular role
2002, 2016, 2025	Blankety Blank	Herself	Guest panellist; 3 episodes
2003	Celebrity Stars in Their Eyes	Herself	Contestant
2005	Lost Dogs	Maria-Carmen Todd	Supporting role
2006	The Secret of Eel Island	Green Beryl	Supporting role
2006–2009, 2014	Loose Women	Herself	Guest panellist
2007	Kings of 70s Romance	Herself	Narrator
2007	Ready Steady Cook	Herself	Contestant
2008	The Greatest Christmas Comedy	Herself	Interviewee
2008	The Slammer	Erica, the critic	Recurring role
2008	Comedy Classics	Herself	Interviewee
2009	Scoop	Receptionist/Mrs Green	Recurring role
2009–2014	This Morning	Herself	Newspaper reviewer
2009, 2011	Celebrity Come Dine with Me	Herself	Contestant
2009	Cash in the Celebrity Attic	Herself	Contestant
2010	Let's Dance for Comic Relief	Herself	Participant
2010	Celebrity Eggheads	Herself	Participant
2011	Being Sold	Mrs Foster	Film
2011	Little Crackers	Wardrobe mistress	1 episode ('My First Brassiere')
2012–2021	Pointless Celebrities	Herself	Regular participant
2014	Secrets from the Asylum	Herself	Contributor
2014	All Star Family Fortunes	Herself	Participant
2014	You Saw Them Here First	Herself	Contributor
2014	Celebrity Antiques Road Trip	Herself	Contributor
2014	Freshers: A Year On	Herself	Contributor
2014–2016	Big Brother's Bit on the Side	Herself	Contributor
2014, 2021	The Chase: Celebrity Special	Herself	Contestant
2015	Flockstars	Herself	Participant
2015	Mel & Sue	Herself	Guest
2015	Celebrity Benchmark	Herself	Participant
2016	Strictly Come Dancing	Herself	Participant
2017	Celebrity 5 Go Motorhoming	Herself	Participant
2017–2018	Hey Duggee	Badger	3 Episodes
2019	Pilgrimage: Road to Rome	Herself	Participant
2021	Emily the Little Match Girl	Grandma	Film
2022	Celebrity Coach Trip	Herself	Winner
2022	Celebrity MasterChef	Herself	Contestant; series 17
2023	Children in Need	Dorien Green	Television special
2023	Jeremy Vine	Herself	Guest panellist; 1 episode
2024	Sage	The Lady	Short film
2024	Celebrity Gogglebox	Herself	Guest; 1 episode
2025	House of David	Witch of Endor	Guest role; episode: "God of Swords"
2026	The Good Ship Murder	Tilly Webster	Guest role; episode: "Cape Verde"
2026	Cooking with the Stars	Herself	Contestant; series 6
2026	The Madame Blanc Mysteries	Carol Jardine	2 episodes

== Stage ==
Year	Title	Role	Location
1964	A Midsummer Night's Dream	Hermia	Abington Park Museum, Northampton
1968	A Midsummer Night's Dream	Titania	Royal Shakespeare Company
1973	Godspell	Sonia	Pavilion Theatre, Bournemouth
1977	The Wizard of Oz	The Good Witch of the North	Birmingham Repertory Theatre
1981	Piaf	Edith Piaf	Belgrade Theatre
1982	Wild, Wild Women!	Madame Lola / Mrs McLaird	Astoria Theatre London and Theatre Royal, Windsor
1986–1988	Exclusive Yarns	Pippa	New Wimbledon Theatre
1991–1992	Cinderella	Wicked Stepmother	Richmond Theatre
1992–1993	Cinderella	Wicked Stepmother	Theatre Royal, Bath
1993–1994	Dick Whittington	Fairy Godmother	Birmingham Hippodrome
1994–1995	Dick Whittington	Alice Fitzwarren	Mayflower Theatre
1995	The Miser	Frosine	UK Tour
1995–1996	Dick Whittington	Fairy Godmother	New Victoria, Woking
1996–1997	Dick Whittington	Alice Fitzwarren	Theatre Royal, Plymouth
1997–1998	Dick Whittington	Fairy Godmother	Wimbledon Theatre
1998–1999	Dick Whittington	Fairy Godmother	Theatre Royal, Nottingham
2000–2001	Dick Whittington	Fairy Godmother	Theatre Royal, Newcastle
2002–2003	Snow White and the Seven Dwarfs	Wicked Queen	Theatre Royal, Brighton
2003	Office Suite	Miss Prothero	Royal Shakespeare Company
2003	Singular Women	Miss Cohen	Kings Head Theatre
2003–2004	Snow White and the Seven Dwarfs	Wicked Queen	Richmond Theatre
2004	The Vagina Monologues	Various	UK Tour
2004	The Gingerbread Lady	Evy Meara	UK Tour
2004–2005	Snow White and the Seven Dwarfs	Wicked Queen	Theatre Royal, Newcastle
2005	Thoroughly Modern Millie	Mrs Meers	UK Tour
2005–2006	Snow White and the Seven Dwarfs	Wicked Queen	Bradford Alhambra
2006	The Vagina Monologues	Various	UK Tour
2006–2007	Snow White and the Seven Dwarfs	Wicked Queen	Wolverhampton Grand
2007–2008	Snow White and the Seven Dwarfs	Wicked Queen	New Theatre, Cardiff
2008–2009	Cinderella	Fairy Godmother	Theatre Royal, Plymouth
2009–2010	Cinderella	Fairy Godmother	Orchard Theatre, Dartford
2010–2011	Snow White and the Seven Dwarfs	Wicked Queen	Grand Theatre, Belfast
2011	Calendar Girls	Chris	UK Tour
2011–2012	Cinderella	Fairy Godmother	Wycombe Swan, High Wycombe
2012	Birds of a Feather	Dorien Green	UK Tour
2012–2013	Robinson Crusoe	Enchantress of the Ocean	Birmingham Hippodrome
2013–2014	Robinson Crusoe	Enchantress of the Ocean	Mayflower Theatre
2014	Hot Flush!	Myra Wilson	UK Tour
2014–2015	Snow White and the Seven Dwarfs	Wicked Queen	Theatre Royal, Nottingham
2015	Annie	Miss Hannigan	UK Tour
2015–2016	Cinderella	Fairy Godmother	Cliffs Pavilion, Southend
2016–2017	Snow White and the Seven Dwarfs	Wicked Queen	Theatre Royal, Plymouth
2017–2018	Young Frankenstein	Frau Blucher	Theatre Royal, Newcastle Garrick Theatre
2018–2019	Cinderella	Fairy Godmother	Churchill Theatre, Bromley
2019–2020	Snow White and the Seven Dwarfs	Wicked Queen	Birmingham Hippodrome
2020–2021	Sleeping Beauty	Carabosse	Mayflower Theatre
2021–2022	Snow White and the Seven Dwarfs	Wicked Queen	Bristol Hippodrome
2022	Sister Act: The Musical	Sister Mary Lazarus	Palace Theatre, Manchester and Hammersmith Apollo
2022–2023	Snow White and the Seven Dwarfs	Wicked Queen	Milton Keynes Theatre
2022–2023	Sister Act: The Musical	Mother Superior	UK Tour
2023–2024	Jack and the Beanstalk	Spirit of the Beans	New Theatre, Cardiff
2024	The Addams Family	Grandma Addams	London Palladium
2024	Sister Act: The Musical	Sister Mary Lazarus/Mother Superior	Dominion Theatre
2024–2025	Snow White and the Seven Dwarfs	Wicked Queen	Theatre Royal, Plymouth
2025	The Addams Family	Grandma	UK Tour
2025–2026	Snow White and the Seven Dwarfs	Wicked Queen	New Victoria Theatre, Woking
2026	Road	Molly	Royal Exchange Theatre, Manchester
