= Jonnie Irwin =

English television presenter (1973–2024)

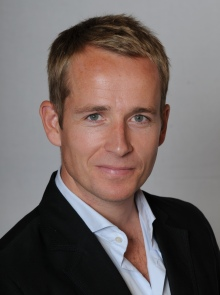
- Born: Jonathan James Irwin; 18 November 1973; Rugby, Warwickshire, England
- Died: 2 February 2024 (aged 50); Newcastle upon Tyne, England
- Occupations: Television presenter; writer; lecturer; business expert; property expert
- Years active: 2004–2023
- Known for: Presenting A Place in the Sun and Escape to the Country
- Spouse: Jessica Holmes (m. 2016)
- Children: 3

Jonathan James Irwin (18 November 1973 – 2 February 2024) was an English television presenter, writer, lecturer, businessman, and property expert. He was best known for presenting the Channel 4 lifestyle programme A Place in the Sun between 2004 and 2021, as well as the BBC daytime programme Escape to the Country between 2010 and 2023.

== Early life ==
Irwin was born on 18 November 1973 in Rugby, Warwickshire, to Avie (née Orr) and James Irwin, a property developer. He grew up on a small farm in the village of Bitteswell, Leicestershire. He was educated at Lutterworth Grammar School and Community College. He obtained a degree from Birmingham City University in estate management. Irwin's father was Irish.

== Career ==
Irwin worked for business transfer specialists Christie & Co, becoming an associate director within three years, before going on to work for Colliers International.

In 2004, he was selected from hundreds of applicants along with co-presenter Jasmine Harman to present Channel 4's show A Place in the Sun – Home or Away, and filmed over 200 episodes all around Britain. The programme is also broadcast daily on More4, Discovery Real Time and Discovery Travel & Living, as well as channels throughout Europe and the rest of the world. In 2022, Irwin accused A Place in the Sun producers of axing him as presenter after 18 years due to a cancer diagnosis, leaving his mood "really low".

Irwin presented episodes of BBC property shows Escape to the Country and To Buy or Not to Buy. He also presented the spin-off of Escape to the Country, Escape to the Perfect Town.

In January 2011, Sky 1 broadcast Irwin's own show, titled Dream Lives for Sale, which saw him help people leave behind their lives in the UK and buy a business. In late 2011 he began a new series, The Renovation Game, which aired on weekday mornings on Channel 4.

Irwin advised clients on business and property, ranging from small high street gift shops to multimillion pound corporate hotel packages. He ran a property and business consultancy.

Irwin wrote a regular column for A Place in the Sun magazine. He appeared at A Place in the Sun Live giving presentations on his tips for buying property abroad. Irwin also regularly hosted seminars and corporate events.

== Personal life ==
Irwin was a keen sportsman. He played cricket many times for Gumley Cricket Club, and rugby for Lutterworth RFC and then for Rugby Lions RFC, until an accident in a sevens tournament in which he broke his back and subsequently retired.

Irwin married Jessica Holmes in September 2016 and they had three sons. Irwin and his family moved to the Hertfordshire town of Berkhamsted in 2018 and then to the Newcastle upon Tyne area.

=== Illness and death ===
In November 2022, Irwin shared that he had terminal lung cancer. He was diagnosed in August 2020 after experiencing blurred vision while driving, and given six months to live.

In an interview with Hello!, Irwin said, "I don't know how long I have left, but I try to stay positive and my attitude is that I'm living with cancer, not dying from it. I set little markers – things I want to be around for [...] I'm doing everything I can to hold that day off for as long as possible. I owe that to Jess and our boys. Some people in my position have bucket lists, but I just want us to do as much as we can as a family." Irwin died on 2 February 2024, aged 50.
