= Flockstars =

- Genre: Talent show
- Presented by: Gabby Logan
- Country of origin: United Kingdom
- Original language: English
- No. of series: 1
- No. of episodes: 8

Production
- Running time: 30 minutes (inc. adverts)
- Production company: Liberty Bell Productions

Original release
- Network: ITV
- Release: 30 July – 17 September 2015

Flockstars is a British television series that ran on ITV from 30 July to 17 September 2015 hosted by Gabby Logan.

The show was cancelled after just one series.

== Format ==
The show followed celebrities as they tried to master the art of sheep herding.

== Celebrities ==
| Celebrity | Known for | Dog's Name | Heat | Status |
|---|---|---|---|---|
| Wendi Peters | Former Coronation Street actress | Bill | 3 | Eliminated 1st on 13 August 2015 |
| Tony Blackburn | Former BBC Radio 1 DJ | Bess | 4 | Eliminated 2nd on 20 August 2015 |
| Fazer | N-Dubz rapper | Jack | 2 | Eliminated 3rd on 27 August 2015 |
| Kéllé Bryan | Eternal singer & actress | Max | 4 | Eliminated 4th on 3 September 2015 |
| Lesley Joseph | Stage & screen actress | Gyp | 2 | Eliminated 5th on 10 September 2015 |
| Lee Pearson | Paralympic para-equestrian | Skye | 3 | Third place on 17 September 2015 |
| Amanda Lamb | Television presenter | Midge | 1 | Runner-up on 17 September 2015 |
| Brendan Cole | Strictly Come Dancing professional | Hoggy | 1 | Winner on 17 September 2015 |

== Episodes ==
=== Heat rounds ===
==== Episode 1 (30 July) ====
| Celebrity | Dog's Name | Time | Result |
|---|---|---|---|
| Brendan Cole | Hoggy | 1m 49s | Eliminated |
| Amanda Lamb | Midge | 1m 25s | Advanced |

==== Episode 2 (6 August 2015) ====
| Celebrity | Dog's Name | Time | Result |
|---|---|---|---|
| Fazer | Jack | 1m 19s | Advanced |
| Lesley Joseph | Gyp | 1m 19.09s | Eliminated |

==== Episode 3 (13 August 2015) ====
| Celebrity | Dog's Name | Time | Result |
|---|---|---|---|
| Wendi Peters | Bill | 2m 30s | Eliminated |
| Lee Pearson | Skye | 2m 31s | Advanced |

==== Episode 4 (20 August 2015) ====
| Celebrity | Dog's Name | Time | Result |
|---|---|---|---|
| Kéllé Bryan | Max | —N/a | Advanced |
| Tony Blackburn | Bess | —N/a | Eliminated |

=== Semi-finals ===
==== Episode 5 (27 August) ====
| Celebrity | Dog's Name | Time | Result |
|---|---|---|---|
| Fazer | Jack | 2m 44s | Eliminated |
| Amanda Lamb | Midge | 1m 44s | Advanced |

==== Episode 6 (3 September 2015) ====
| Celebrity | Dog's Name | Time | Result |
|---|---|---|---|
| Kéllé Bryan | Max | —N/a | Eliminated |
| Lee Pearson | Skye | —N/a | Advanced |

==== Episode 7 (10 September 2015) ====
| Celebrity | Dog's Name | Time | Result |
|---|---|---|---|
| Brendan Cole | Hoggy | —N/a | Advanced |
| Lesley Joseph | Gyp | —N/a | Eliminated |

=== Final (17 September) ===
| Celebrity | Dog's Name | Time | Result |
|---|---|---|---|
| Amanda Lamb | Midge | —N/a | Runner-up |
| Brendan Cole | Hoggy | —N/a | Winner |
| Lee Pearson | Skye | —N/a | Third Place |
