= Jimi Famurewa =

British journalist and food critic

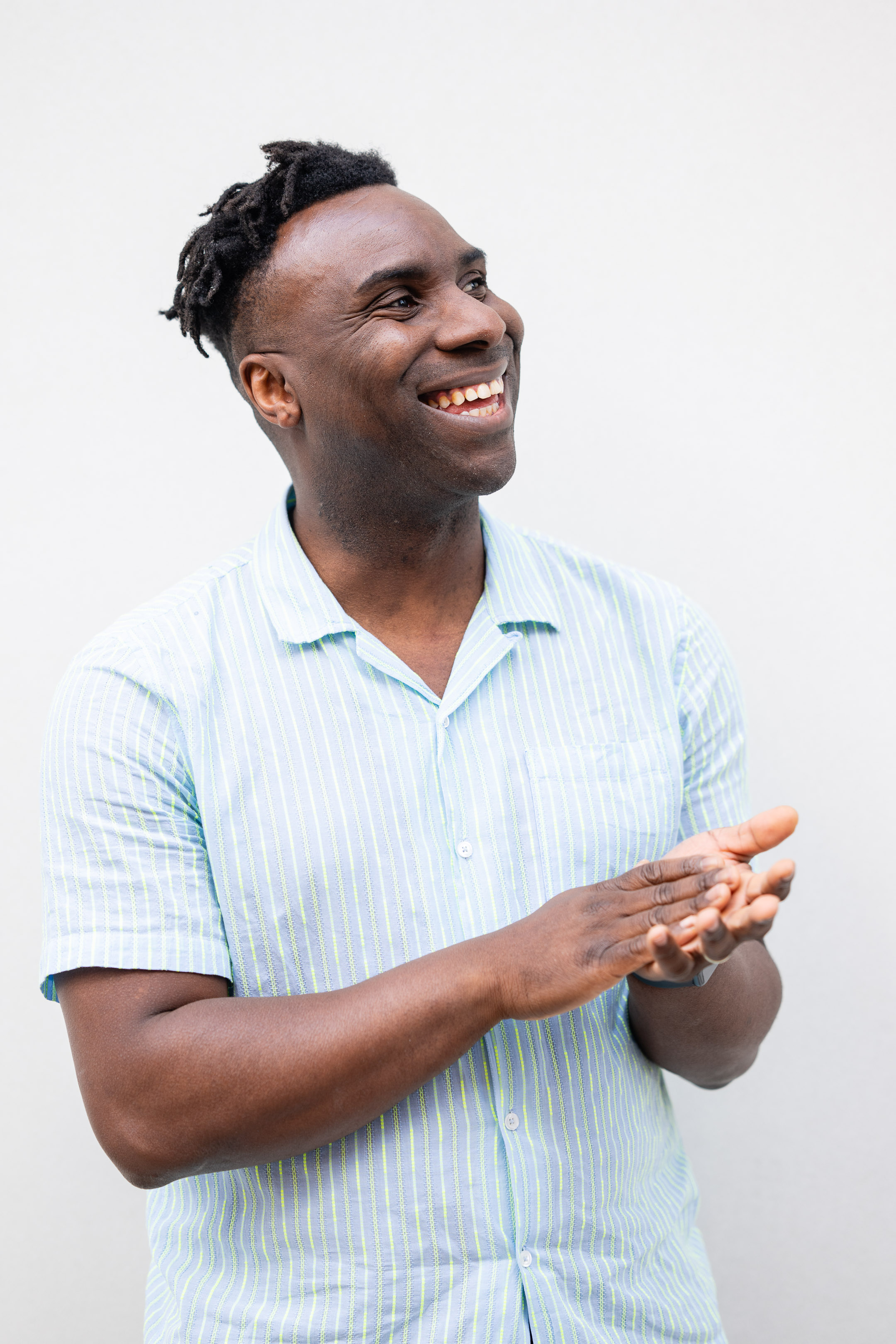
Famurewa in 2025

Jimi Famurewa is a British journalist and food critic.

== Early life ==
Famurewa was born in London, England to Nigerian immigrant parents on 21 October 1983. He grew up in London.

== Career ==
As a freelance journalist, Famurewa has written on diverse subjects for publications including Maxim, The Guardian, GQ, Empire, Wired, Grazia and Time Out.

He started working at the Evening Standard in 2015. He became the food critic for their ES Magazine in September 2018, before being made the Chief Restaurant Critic of the paper in December 2020, with his first piece appearing in January 2021. His ES Magazine column won him the 2020 Restaurant Writing Award from the Guild of Food Writers. He won the award again in 2021.

He wrote the short story "Teddybird" (2017) that was shortlisted in the Guardian 4th Estate BAME Short Story Prize.

He co-hosts a podcast for Waitrose. He has appeared on TV, including on the BBC's Masterchef, Masterchef: The Professionals, Step Up to the Plate and Richard Osman's House of Games. He also appeared in Season 20 of Top Chef.

A podcast, Where's Home Really, by Famurewa was announced in February 2023. The show launched on 2 March 2023.

== Personal life ==
Famurewa lives in south-east London with his wife and two children.
