= Money for Nothing (TV programme) =

- Created by: Sarah Moore
- Presented by: Sarah Moore; Jay Blades (2017–2020); Jacqui Joseph (2020–); JJ Chalmers (2021–); EJ Osborne (2017–2019; His death)
- Narrated by: Arthur Smith
- Country of origin: United Kingdom
- Original language: English
- No. of series: 19
- No. of episodes: 360

Production
- Executive producer: Arthur Moore
- Producer: Arthur Moore
- Running time: 45 minutes
- Production companies: Friel Kean Films Ltd. BBC Scotland

Original release
- Network: BBC One
- Release: 7 September 2015 – present

Related
- Celebrity Money for Nothing

Money for Nothing is a British consumer television series, hosted on a rotational basis by Sarah Moore, Jacqui Joseph and JJ Chalmers, and formerly by Jay Blades and EJ Osborne. It airs on BBC One. Earlier series are available for viewing on Netflix.

== Format ==
The premise of the programme is to take items that other people are disposing of and which the presenter rescues from council refuse collection sites. With the help of a designer they are turned into desirable items, which are then sold. Any profit made is then returned to the individual(s) who disposed of the item originally. A voiceover narration is provided by comedian and writer Arthur Smith. Celebrity Money for Nothing was a related programme, which only lasted one series.

Regular designers and craftspeople include: Norman Wilkinson, Rupert Blanchard, Forge Creative (Josh Kennard & Oliver "Oli" Milne), Sarah Peterson, bag designer Neil Wragg, Lighting Expert Duncan McKean of Albert & Edward, Ray Clarke, Daniel Heath, Mark 'Horse' Philips, Bex Simon, The Rag and Bone Man, Guy Trench, Simion Dallas Hawtin-Smith and Bruce Faulseit.

== Presenters ==
Jacqui Joseph joined the presenting team from series 9, with JJ Chalmers joining a series later. Jay Blades first appeared as one of the designer experts for the first two series before becoming a presenter from Series 3 onwards. In 2021, due to other TV commitments (The Repair Shop, Jay and Dom's Home Fix), Blades ceased to host the programme. EJ Osborne joined the presenting team during series 4, but left during series 7 due to illness. He died on 22 September 2020 at Dorothy House Hospice following months of chemotherapy.

== Series overview ==
=== Regular series ===
Series	Episodes	Originally aired	
Series	Episodes	Start date	End date
1	15	7 September 2015	27 September 2015
2	25	11 April 2016	14 November 2016
3	30	6 March 2017	17 April 2017
4	30	9 October 2017	6 April 2018
5	20	8 October 2018	2 November 2018
6	20	11 March 2019	5 April 2019
7	20	7 October 2019	1 November 2019
8	20	2 March 2020	3 November 2020
9	20	4 November 2020	14 December 2020
10	20	19 April 2021	14 May 2021
11	20	11 October 2021	5 November 2021
12	20	6 June 2022	26 October 2022
13	20	21 September 2022	15 December 2022
14	20	15 May 2023	28 June 2023
15	20	29 August 2023	1 November 2023
16	20	2 April 2024	30 May 2024
17	20	27 May 2025	14 August 2025

=== Celebrity series ===
Series	Episodes	Originally aired	
Series	Episodes	Start date	End date
1	15	4 September 2017	22 September 2017
