= Conservation and restoration of wooden furniture =

Preservation of heritage collections

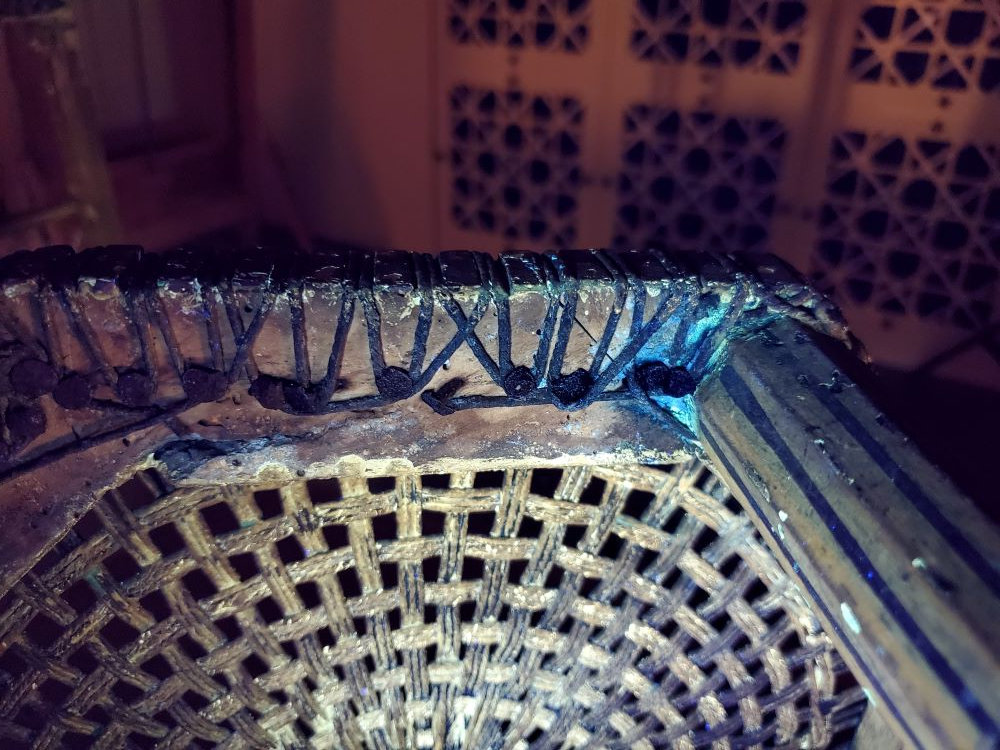
A National Trust conservator uses ultraviolet to identify old glue as part of restoration

The conservation and restoration of wooden furniture is an activity dedicated to the preservation and protection of wooden furniture objects of historical and personal value. When applied to cultural heritage this activity is generally undertaken by a conservator-restorer. Furniture conservation and restoration can be divided into two general areas: structure and finish. Structure generally relates to wood and can be divided into solid, joined, and veneered wood. The finish of furniture can be painted or transparent.

Furniture has existed throughout all the years of human existence. Furniture that is very dated or is an antique can be conserved or restored so that future generations may also enjoy them for cultural, educational and personal benefit. There are many organizations and guidebooks that can be used to understand the techniques that are used to conserve and restore furniture.

== Conservation ==
The conservation of furniture is the synthesis of three major endeavors, according to the Smithsonian Museum Conservation Institute:

1. The minimization of deterioration (preservation);
2. The consolidation (stabilization) of artifacts as they currently exist;
3. Repair/replacement (compensation or restoration) of existing damage.

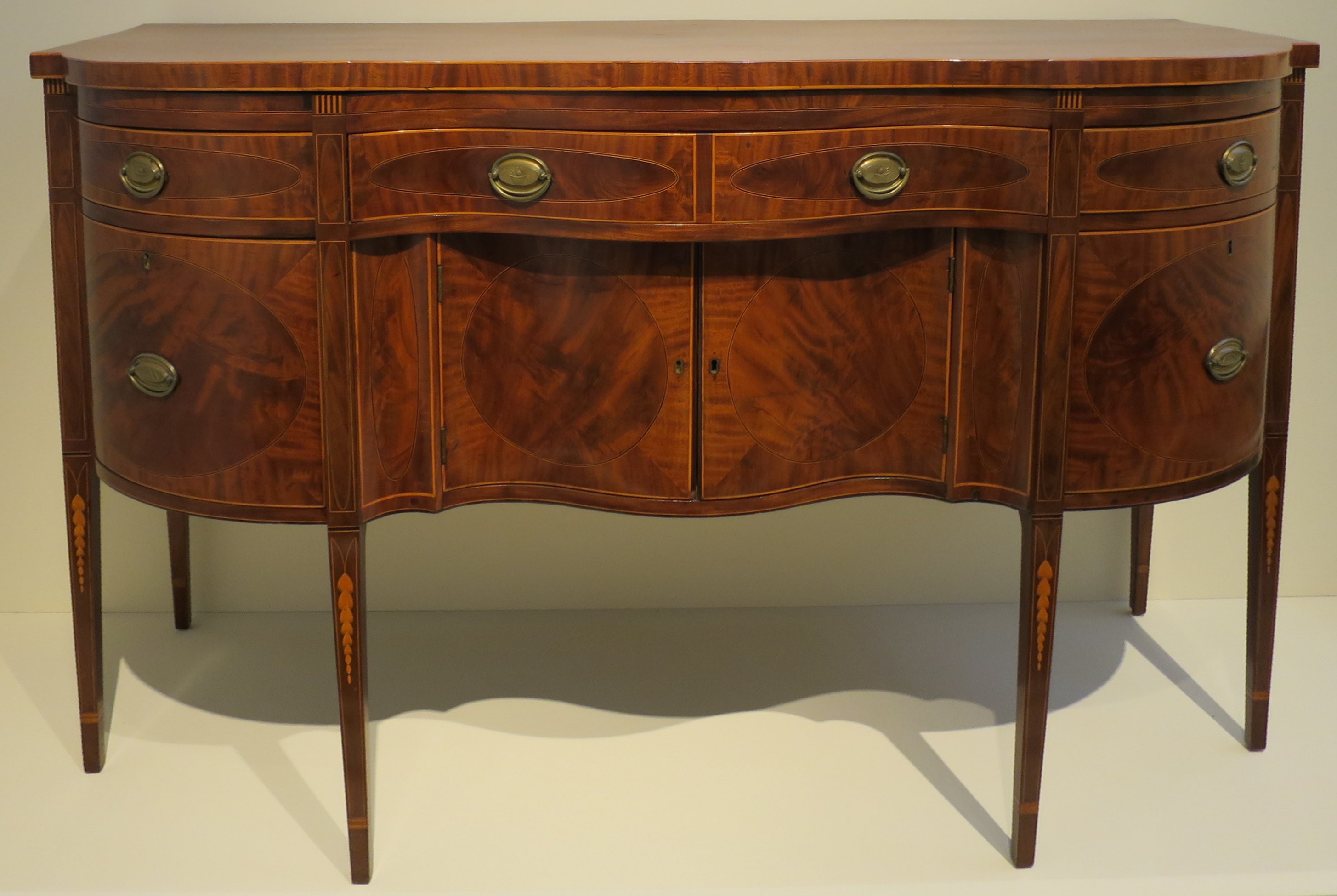
American sideboard, late 18th century, Honolulu Museum of Art, 3407.1

Preventive conservation is the form of conservation recognized here with furniture care. The American Institute for Conservation of Historic and Artistic Works declares that stripping and refinishing furniture is no longer standard practice. An early finish is as important to historic furniture as are any of the other original elements. The finish coating offers important data to researchers and is part of the history of the object and once it is removed, it cannot be recovered. The removal and replacement of a surface finish is considered a last ditch effort after other conservation methods have failed.

=== The Institut national du patrimoine ===
In France, conservators specialized in furniture are trained at the Institut National du Patrimoine (The National Institute of Cultural Heritage). Their mission is to intervene when heritage resources are threatened or deteriorated for several reasons. The conservator prevents works of art from disappearing or loses its purpose whilst analyzing the complex stage of its material history and the cause of alteration.

== Restoration ==
Antiques restoration can be an arduous process if the goal is total and complete authenticity. For conservators, authentic material is the actual original material of the object. For example: A chair with its original upholstery, even if it is faded and shredded, is authentic for the conservator and possesses historic value even though it may not be exhibitable. The same chair can be "restored" and looking as it did when new, with replacement fabric copied from the original weave and colors, and upholstered according to the known design of that particular piece of furniture; this would represent the other kind of authenticity.

== Original material ==
Furniture can be divided into periods dominated by the use of a particular wood.

- Until the late 17th Century oak was dominant.
- From the mid-17th Century, walnut gradually became the main wood for the outside and drawer sides in the best quality pieces with oak still used for the underlying part.
- In the second quarter of the 18th Century the first mahogany was imported from the West Indies and eventually replaced walnut.
- By the 1790s, satinwood was popular as a decorative exotic timber for top quality pieces.
- During the Regency period rosewood was predominant.
- Since then no one species has dominated.

Furniture can consist of many different, and extra, components:

- Original adhesives
- Upholstery fabric
- Webbing and stuffing
- Casters
- Labels
- Accretions and stains from original use and from later periods
- Old dust in crevices
- Repair hardware and adhesives
- Objects left in drawers or cupboards
- Whole replacement parts
- Carcase (the main structural elements making up the body of a piece of furniture)

== Upholstered furniture ==
Dusting upholstered furniture can be achieved by placing a soft screen on the surface and using a brush attachment on a HEPA vacuum with gentle suction. For further cleaning of upholstered furniture, such as stains, this may most likely require a textile conservator, in addition to a conservator with knowledge of wooden furniture.

When a conservator-restorer is working on upholstered furniture it is important for them to consider innovative approaches to reversibility, the maximum preservation of information, and the use of chemically stable materials. Treatments can produce objects that appear indistinguishable from furniture upholstered in traditional ways, but the actual means of attachment does not include any nails or staples that pierce wood. Velcro makes it possible to examine the carcass of the furniture without undoing any part of the treatment. When furniture is treated using these techniques, stuffing is typically replaced by Ethafoam carved to the appropriate shape. The resulting object has a seat that looks like the original one, but is not "sittable".

American furniture from the mid-nineteenth century probably received new upholstery about every thirty years. Sometimes new fabric was placed on top of the old, and at other times worn upholstery was entirely removed before the new covering was applied. Conservator-restorers can sometimes find threads of original fiber evidence on the chair frame, usually around tack holes. This can guide them to the creation of a reproduction of the original upholstery if an original fabric is not available.

=== Marie Antoinette's chair ===
The Victoria and Albert Museum has a case study on their website that describes the conservation treatment that was carried out on Marie Antoinette's chair in preparation for its display in the new Europe galleries due to open in 2015. The chair was made in 1788 by Jean-Baptiste-Claude Sené (1748–1803). The chair has been re-upholstered several times, re-gilded and over-painted. The last intervention was in the 1970s when it was upholstered in blue swagged fabric and partially painted a greyish blue.

== Varnish ==
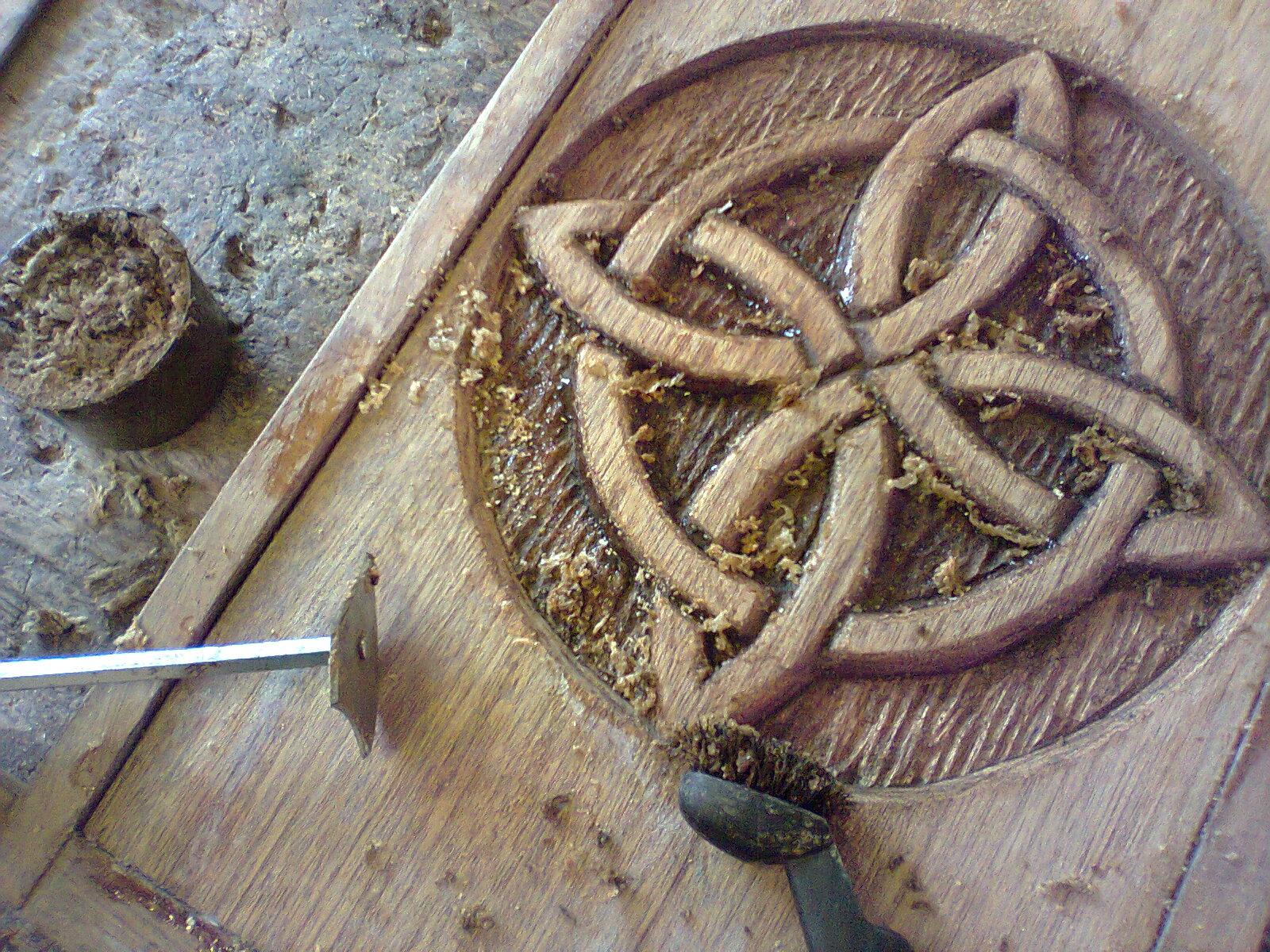
Wooden furniture is taken apart when renewing varnish to improve the finish.

A synthetic varnish, cellulose nitrate, was developed in the 1850s but was not available in a formulation suitable for commercial furniture until the late 1920s. Unfortunately, cellulose nitrate discolors and becomes brittle as it ages, so over time, the coating on furniture can turn yellow and opaque. It can also crisscross in some places by a fine network of cracks or the varnish can fall off completely. The early date and rarity of this original coating makes it important to retain the varnish on furniture despite these problems.

In a case study of an armoire with this condition from the 1930s from the Museum of Fine Arts in Boston, Massachusetts: "Conservators used a more stable synthetic resin, a type of acrylic copolymer dissolved in a solvent, to consolidate weakened areas of the original varnish without significantly changing the glossiness of its finish or its color. To provide a consistent overall finish, they tinted a portion of that solution the same color as the aged cellulose nitrate to fill some of the more jarring losses. In the future, the new varnish will not be easy to remove, if it can be removed at all, but the synthetic resin used by the conservators is known to have good aging properties."

== Conditions ==
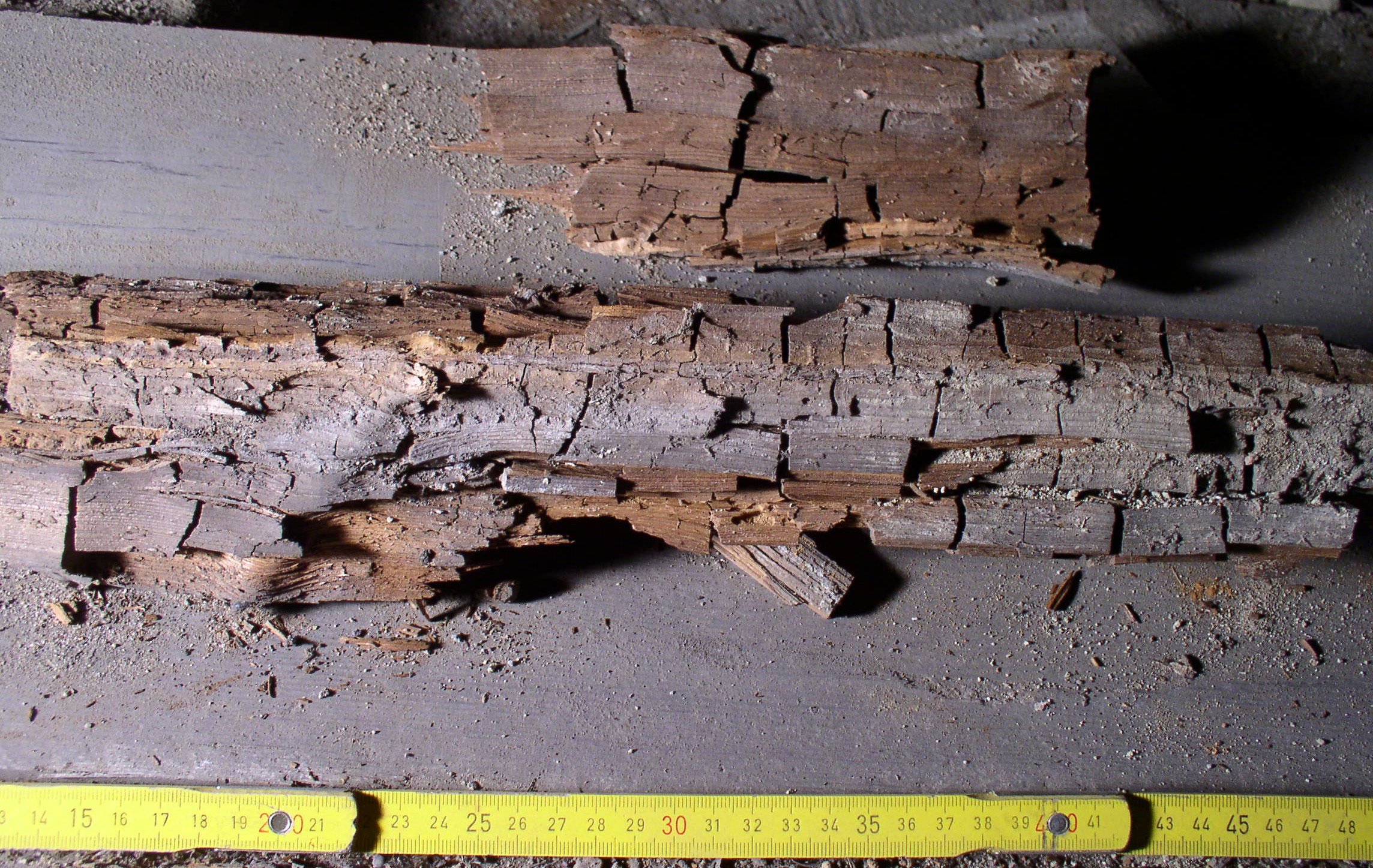
Dry rot

The following is a list of Wood Terms to describe conditions, as suggested by MRM5: Museum Registration Methods 5th Edition:

Alligatoring: Series of hairline cracks in old varnish, creating the appearance of alligator hide.

Checking: Slight gapping between wood cells that creates a checkerboard-like pattern. Found where wood is cut straight across the grain for carving, such as in a ball-and-claw foot.

Dry rot: Decay of seasoned timber caused by fungi that consume the cellulose of wood, leaving a soft skeleton that is readily reduced to powder.

Shrinkage: A loss of mass or size in response to dry relative humidity conditions.

== Preventable damage ==
Preventive conservation is a form of conservation that you can do for furniture without a scientific conservation degree.

=== The impact of the environment ===
A poorly controlled environment can cause detached veneer, cracks, and flaking paint.

==== Light ====
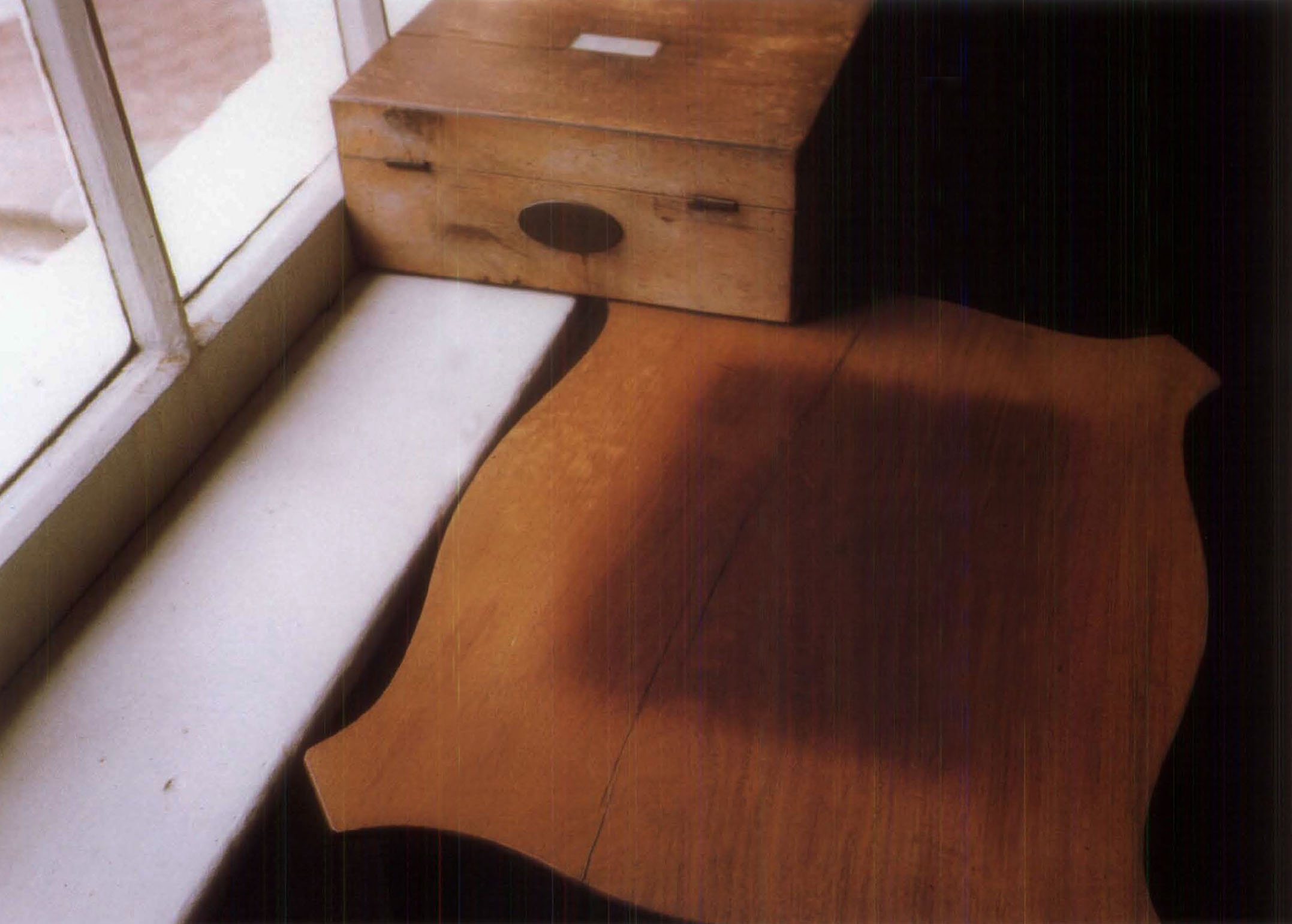
Light has faded the finish of the table top except in the center, where the box rested and shielded the finish

Light easily causes color fading. Light is a major concern for furniture because the stains and color of wood are very susceptible to both natural and artificial light.

==== Temperature and relative humidity ====
To prevent cracks and veneer cleavage, avoid placing furniture near radiators, heat vents or other areas where temperature and relative humidity (RH) fluctuate widely. A stable relative humidity is particularly important to furniture since rapid changes cause different parts of the object to expand and contract at different rates and to different degrees. If the relative humidity is over 60% fungi, such as molds and mildews, will become rampant on wooden furniture. The recommended range for wooden furniture is 45–55% RH.

Impacts of change in RH on wooden furniture:

Low RH

- Wood shrinks and splits
- Joints become loose and the elements no longer fir together tightly
- Veneers and inlays suffer – If the underlying carcase wood shrinks, cracks will appear in the veneer and inlays become loose
- When the glues holding them down fail, veneers lift
- Causes polishes to shrink, craze and flake

High RH

- Swelling can cause moving parts such as cabinet doors or drawers to jam
- If glue fails, veneer peels away
- Corrosion affects nails holding things in place, metal inlay and fillings
- Insects and rot may flourish as the content of the wood rises

Fast and constant cycling of RH fluctuations causes the most damage for all of the above to create rapid structural weakening.

==== Pests ====
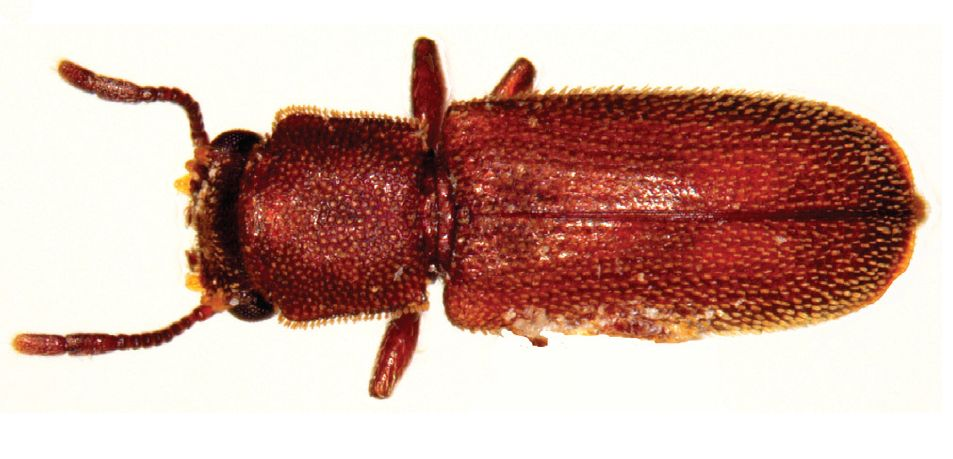
Powderpost beetle

A common furniture pest is the powderpost beetle, less than a quarter-inch long, which lays its eggs in small crevices. The insect larvae burrow into the wood, creating networks of tunnels as they eat their way along the grain. As they mature to adults, they bore out of the wood leaving an "exit" or "flight" hole and fly off to lay their eggs, completing the cycle.

The Museum of Fine Arts, Boston, presented a case study of an early 19th-century bed with an infestation of woodworms:

To protect the bed from damage and prevent pests from spreading to other works of art, it was critical to treat the new acquisition before it entered the building. Conservators completely sealed the bed in a giant impermeable bag and placed an oxygen scavenger inside. In this case, the scavenger was made of fine iron particles. Iron reacts rapidly with oxygen, binding the gas itself and thereby removing it from the air. With the appropriate amount of scavenger in the sealed environment, the conservators brought the oxygen down from normal air levels of 20 percent to less than 0.1 percent. After about four weeks in containment, all of the bed's woodworms in all life stages suffocated. Then the object could be safely brought into the Museum. No toxic chemicals were involved in the treatment, and the conservators disposed of the spent scavenger safely.

==== Handling and moving furniture ====
Perhaps the greatest cause of damage to furniture is people due to misuse and mishandling, creating physical damage. Always wear clean cotton gloves and handle objects as little as possible. Check furniture for damage or loose joins before moving it. Remove objects from the surface and then remove drawers, shelves, and doors. Elements that cannot be removed should be secured with soft cloth (cotton) straps.

As well as structural damage, dents, surface wear, scratches, stains and wax from candles are all evidence of past use. Water splashed from repeated floor washing, or spilt from flower displays damages bare or polished surfaces, most commonly leaving white marks. Cups and glasses leave 'rings' on polished surfaces. Alcohol spilt will remove the polished surface almost instantly.

== Furniture maintenance ==
For the most part, maintaining furniture simply means keeping it clean, carefully.

=== Cleaning ===
Furniture oils are not recommended for maintenance as many of them contain linseed oil or other drying oils, and when used repeatedly will create a gummy, insoluble surface coating that darkens and obscures the grain of the wood. Other furniture polishes contain non-drying oils such as lemon oil, but attract and entrap dirt and grime. Silicone polishes are also not recommended as they leave a film that is difficult to remove and can interfere with future finish treatments.

=== Tools for furniture care ===
The Hammond-Harwood House and City of Bowie Museums Collector's Corner Workshop Series provides a resource on Furniture Cleaning and Care which addresses the tools and techniques of furniture cleaning.

- Petroleum-free nitrile gloves
- Cotton cloths
- Synthetic cloths, "Pel cloth" and "Preserve-It"
- Brushes, "Hake" or "Windsor-Newton" brushes
- Distilled water
- Liquefied hide glue, "Titebond Liquid Hide Glue", "Old Brown Glue"
- Cotton swab, balls, or wool
- Brush cleaner, "The Master's"
- Paste or butchers wax, "Butchers", "Johnson", "Goddard's", and "Trewax"

The Canadian Conservation Institute recommends that micro-crystalline wax (a scent- and colour-free white paste wax that is available at specialty tool supply stores) can be used to increase the gloss of the finish, which will make it easier to remove fingerprints. Do this only once a year and only to the surfaces that are handled, being careful to avoid wax build-up around metal fittings.

== Education ==
The Smithsonian Museum Conservation Institute has a graduate-level course of study Furniture Conservation Training Program that was established in 1986.

Winterthur Museum, Garden and Library sponsors two graduate programs with the University of Delaware: The Winterthur program in American Material Culture, founded in 1952, and the Winterthur-University of Delaware Program in Art Conservation founded in 1974.

== Organizations dedicate to furniture conservation and restoration ==
- Institute of Conservation (Icon)
- American Institute for Conservation
- The Smithsonian's Museum Conservation Institute (MCI)
- Canadian Conservation Institute
- Sustaining Places: Resources for Small Museums and Historic Sites
- Connecting to Collections Care, Online Community
- National Park Service Museum Management Program
- Getty Conservation Institute
- Victoria and Albert Museum Conservation Department

== See also ==
- Furniture
- Conservation science
- Collections care
- Conservator-restorer
- Conservation and restoration of cultural property § Preventive conservation
- Textile conservator
