= Chaos at the Chateau =

2007 British reality television program

- Genre: reality
- Country of origin: United Kingdom
- Original language: English
- No. of episodes: 7

Original release
- Network: Channel 4
- Release: 22 March – 4 May 2007

Chaos at the Chateau is a reality television program that ran from March to May 2007 on Channel 4 in the United Kingdom. The show follows the lives of Ann and David Darrell, originally from Essex, who decided to renovate an old chateau in Slovakia and turn it into a luxury boutique hotel. As well as looking at the problems the couple faced in finding, renovating and running the hotel, it also deals with their relationship.

The show is a continuation of the series A Place in Slovakia, which followed the couple's attempts to find a suitable chateau. It was described by the Sunday Times' Peter Conradi as a "real life Fawlty Towers".

Controversy surrounded David Darrell when it was revealed, following the transmission of the programme, that he was being pursued for £950,000 for alleged fraudulent practices that occurred during his time as an Insolvency Practitioner. He was removed from the Register of Insolvency Practitioners in 2003 because of concerns regarding work that he had been invoiced for, but allegedly not carried out.

In March 2008, the Darrells put their Slovak chateau on the market for €3,000,000.

== Authenticity ==
The show is presented in fly-on-the-wall documentary style. Appearing on the talk show Richard & Judy, Ann Darrell stated that "It's all real" and held her head in embarrassment at some of the events.

However, debate exists about how much of the show is staged for the cameras, due to the apparently implausible events that take place, and the perception that the characters are acting (albeit playing exaggerated versions of themselves), plus various technical aspects of the production, such as camera positioning. Some suggest that the show is loosely based on real events but re-shot in an exaggerated manner to provide higher comedy value.

It should be mentioned however that filming takes place over a long period of time, and thus events from several weeks are combined into a single episode, making it so eventful (and therefore unrealistic). In addition, the earlier series about the couple, A Place in Slovakia, also contained many comedic elements, and there were no suggestions that this was scripted.

== Episodes ==
No.	Title	Original release date
1	"Finding Chateau Salgovce"	22 March 2007
Ann and David try to find a suitable chateau to buy and renovate.
2	"Renovating Chateau Salgovce"	29 March 2007
The couple try to appoint a hotel manager. They finally appointed Frenchman Thierry.
3	"Welcoming guests"	5 April 2007
The couple receive a visit from a hotel inspector. David is forced to take the guests to a nearby winemaker and hide the staff as the couple do not have official approval to open the hotel.
4	"Pork Night"	12 April 2007
As the chateau has so far had only a few guests, David decides to try to make money another way by holding a "Pork Night" for the locals. Thierry is not happy and tries to change the Pork Night menu, leading to a huge argument with David, after which Theirry walks out. Despite supporting her husband at first, after Pork Night Ann decides that Thierry was right and talks him into returning to the hotel.
5	"Thierry's Friends"	19 April 2007
The chef is off sick and Thierry has to cook for the guests. Thierry has arranged for his friends, three gay couples, to stay at the chateau. Ann loves playing hostess, but David is less thrilled when he discovers that Ann has upgraded one couple to stay in David and Ann's own bedroom. Thierry is very upset that Ann has not helped in the kitchen and that he has not seen his friends, and he begins sulking. Ann puts Thierry in his place.
6	"Muck Spreading"	26 April 2007
The couple hold their first business conference. However, Ann and David's problems continue when they discover that one of the staff has been taking alcohol and other items from the bedrooms. Further problems arise when some of their patio furniture is stolen. Ann threatens that they could all be fired. They also have problems with the local farmer who is using a road on Ann and David's land as a short cut while muck spreading. The most devastating news comes when Ann and David find out that both of their puppies have been killed.
7	"The Investors"	4 May 2007
Ann and David meet a wealthy Slovak couple with the aim of persuading them to invest in the chateau so that they could develop the vast land around it. However, the couple surprise Ann and David by offering to buy the chateau instead. Much to the staff's relief the couple turned down the offer. At the end of the episode Ann and David renew their wedding vows at the chateau.
