= Amanda Lamb =

British model and television presenter

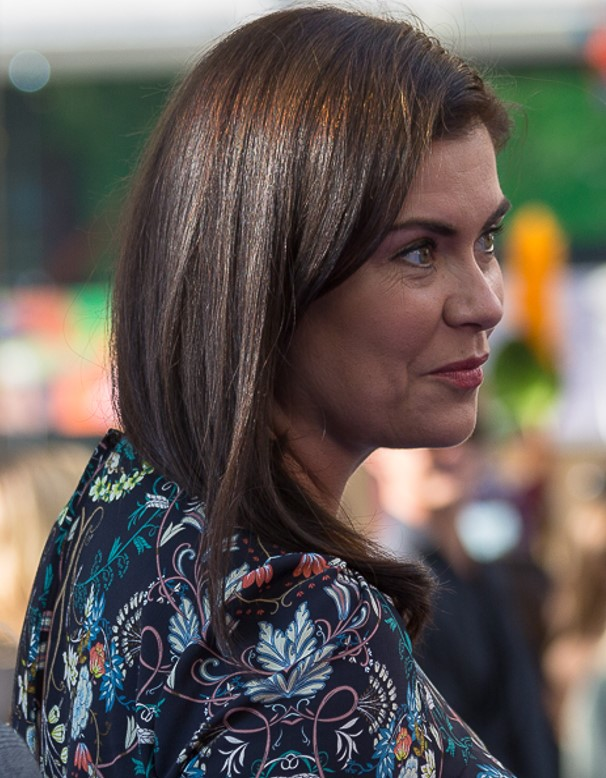
- Lamb at the Pan premiere in 2015
- Born: 19 July 1972 (age 54); Portsmouth, Hampshire, England
- Occupations: TV presenter; property expert; model
- Known for: A Place in the Sun; You Deserve This House
- Spouse(s): Mike Carter (1998–2003; divorced) Sean McGuinness (m. 2012)
- Children: 2
- Modelling information
- Height: 1.82 m (5 ft 11 1/2 in)
- Hair colour: Brown
- Eye colour: Green

Amanda Lamb (born 19 July 1972) is an English television presenter, property expert and former model who is notable for presenting A Place in the Sun (from 2001 until 2009) and You Deserve This House. She has also had notable appearances on various television programmes as a panellist or as a guest on shows such as The Games, Harry Hill's TV Burp and Pointless Celebrities.

== Early life and early career ==
Amanda Lamb was born in Portsmouth and was brought up in Havant, Hampshire. She worked as an estate agent in Havant and part-time as a barmaid for five years before becoming a model.

== Career ==
=== Modelling ===
In 1994, she took over the role of the "Scottish Widow" from Deborah Moore in a long-running series of advertisements for the investment company, Scottish Widows Fund and Life Assurance Society. David Bailey once asked Lamb to glide across the screen wearing roller skates in a scene which never made the final cut. Lamb's final advert and her favourite was called "The Lighthouse", this contract lasted ten years.

=== Television ===
In 2001, Lamb became the main presenter of the Channel 4 programme A Place in the Sun. She also presented Hot Shots, an Epson-funded programme about digital photography, shown on Discovery Real Time, which was notable as being the last television appearance of photographer Patrick Lichfield.

She competed in the reality television show The Games in March 2006. Lamb then returned to filming A Place in the Sun, in which she still appears.

She co-hosted the cookery programme Market Kitchen (Good Food) and regularly appears on The Wright Stuff (Channel 5) and on Family Super Cooks (Watch).

In 2011, Lamb filmed the first of three series of My Flat-Pack Home for the Home Channel. In March 2012, she began presenting You Deserve This House, a new Channel 4 daytime show in which the homes of 'community heroes' are secretly refurbished.

From 2014 to 2018, Lamb presented a prime-time property show on More4 called Selling Houses with Amanda Lamb. On 20 August 2020, she announced on Instagram that she would be presenting a new show called My Mortgage Free Home. This was to air in 2023.

== Personal life ==
Lamb married Mike Carter in 1998; they divorced in 2003. Lamb married cameraman Sean McGuinness at Babington House, Somerset, in 2012, separated 2025. They have two daughters, Willow Rose (born in February 2009) and Lottie (born in July 2013).

In 2007, Lamb bought a flat in the medieval town of Nardò in the Apulia region, southern Italy.

Lamb has supported the charities Mind, Cancer Research and Shelter.

She lives in London.

== Filmography ==
=== Television ===
Year(s)	Programme	Role	Notes
2001–2009	A Place in the Sun	Herself	Presenter
2002	TV Mail	Herself	Presenter
2003	RI:SE	Herself	Guest
2004–2006	Richard & Judy	Herself	Guest, 4 episodes
2005	The Weakest Link	Herself	Contestant & Winner
2005	Hot Shots	Herself	Presenter, 9 episodes
2006	The Games	Herself	Panellist, 8 episodes
2006–2013	Loose Women	Herself	Guest panelist, 4 episodes
2006–2018	The Wright Stuff	Herself	Guest panellist, 98 episodes
2007	Celebrity Big Brother's Big Mouth	Herself	Guest, 2 episodes
2007	Market Kitchen	Herself	
2007	Get Me the Producer	Herself	
2007	3 Minute Wonder	Herself	
2007	Size Matters: Celebrities on the Scales	Herself	
2008	An Audience with Neil Diamond	Herself	Audience member
2008	How TV Changed Britain	Herself	
2009–2010	Angela and Friends	Herself	Guest presenter, 4 episodes
2009–2010	Countdown	Herself	Dictionary Corner
2009	Pride of Britain Awards	Herself	
2010	Street Market Chefs	Herself	Presenter, 3 episodes
2010	GMTV	Herself	
2010	Greatest Christmas TV Ads	Herself	Presenter
2010–2011	Daybreak	Herself	Competition presenter, 11 episodes
2011	My Flat Pack Home	Herself	Presenter
2011	Al Murray's Compete for the Meat	Herself	Contestant
2012	Harry Hill's TV Burp	Herself	Guest role in final episode
2012	You Deserve This House	Herself	Presenter
2012–2013	Sunday Brunch	Herself	Guest, 2 episodes
2013	What's Cooking? From the Sainsbury's Kitchen	Herself	Guest
2014	Weekend Kitchen with Waitrose	Herself	Guest
2014–2017	Weekend	Herself	Guest, 2 episodes
2014–2018	Selling Houses with Amanda Lamb	Herself	Presenter
2015	Lorraine	Herself	Guest, 1 episode
2015	Flockstars	Herself	Contestant
2015	Celebrity Fifteen to One	Herself	Contestant
2016	The Saturday Show	Herself	Presenter, 2 episodes
2017	Pointless Celebrities	Herself	Panellist
2018	When Award Shows Go Horribly Wrong	Herself	Runner-up: Miss Leigh Park 1986
2018	Saturday Morning with James Martin	Herself	Guest, 2 episode
2019	Kirstie's Celebrity Craft Masters	Herself	Guest, 1 episode
2019	Celebrity Chase	Herself	Contestant
2020	Jeremy Vine	Herself	
2020	This Morning	Herself	
2020–2021	My Mortgage Free Home	Herself	Presenter, 11 episodes
2021	Moment of Truth	Herself	
2022, 2024	Richard Osman's House of Games		
2022	Holiday Homes in the Sun	Co-presenter	with JB Gill & Sam Pinkham
2024	Sunshine Getaways with Amanda Lamb	Co-presenter	with JB Gill & Sam Pinkham
2024	Robin Elliot Tonight	Guest	
2024	Air Fryers Made Easy	Herself	1 episode
2025	Jimmy and Shivis Farmhouse Breakfast	Guest	1 episode
2026	Amandaland	Herself	Comic Relief special

=== Podcasts ===
Year	Programme	Role	Notes
2026	The Harry Hill Show	Herself	Guest
