= Seetha Hallett =

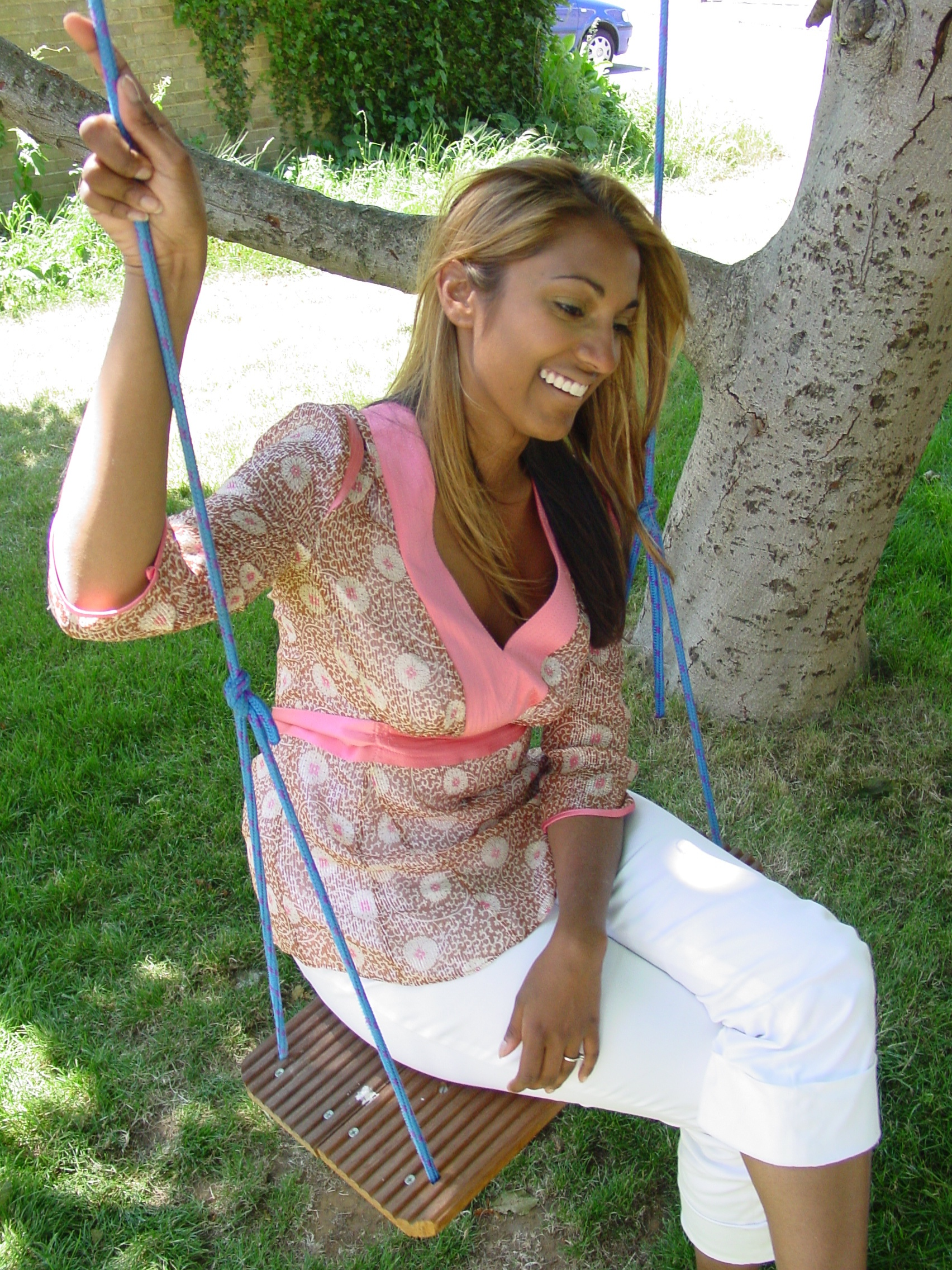
Seetha Hallett

Seetha Hallett (born 8 July 1979) is a British television presenter for the Channel 4 series A Place by the Sea.

== Early life and career ==
Hallett was born in London. Having gained a degree in finance, she worked as a business analyst for major American and Dutch banks until 2004, when she became the face of the new Channel 4 series A Place by the Sea.

In each hour-long programme, Hallett helps people relocate permanently to start a brand new life or find a second home to relive their childhood holidays. The most recent series saw Hallett taking her house hunters on various activities, from abseiling down a 120 ft cliff in the Isle of Man to waterskiing in the west of Scotland. The programme is now in its fourth series.

Hallett has travelled extensively. She spends much of her free time enjoying outdoor pursuits, including scuba diving. Food and music also play a big part in her life. She has a qualification in business French and understands basic German.
