= Jasmine Harman =

British television presenter and property expert

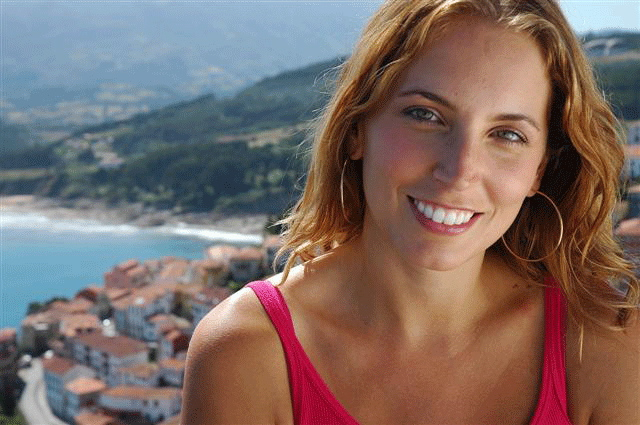
- Born: Jasmine Isabelle Harman; 15 November 1975 (age 50); Enfield, London, England
- Occupations: TV presenter, radio presenter, property expert, and writer
- Known for: Presenting: A Place in the Sun: Home or Away? Collectaholics
- Spouse: Jon Boast (m. 2009)
- Children: 2
- Website: Official website

Jasmine Isabelle Harman (born 15 November 1975) is an English television presenter, radio presenter, property expert, and writer. From 2004 to 2019 she co-presented the Channel 4 series A Place in the Sun: Home or Away? alongside Jonnie Irwin.

== Early career ==
Harman began her career in the health and fitness industry and later moved into television. She is a qualified fitness instructor and lived in the Algarve for several years, working as marketing manager for a health resort. It was here that she began writing as a professional and hosted her own twice-weekly live magazine show on an Algarve radio station, Kiss FM.

== Television ==
In 2004, Harman was selected to co-present the Channel 4 show A Place in the Sun: Home or Away?

The programme is broadcast daily on More4, Discovery Real Time and Discovery Travel & Living, as well as channels in Europe and beyond, including New Zealand, Australia and South Africa. She has also featured in property, travel, health and lifestyle programmes for This Morning, GMTV and the Travel Channel.

On 16 August 2011, a BBC One documentary, My Hoarder Mum and Me, was broadcast. It featured Jasmine and her siblings trying to help their mother, Vasoulla, to manage her hoarding. On 8 May 2012, the documentary was extended to include other hoarders as Britain's Biggest Hoarders.

She fronted the BBC One documentary Britain's Compulsive Shoppers in August 2014. She was a presenter on the programme The Truth About Your Teeth which was broadcast on BBC One in June 2015. She also presented the second series of Collectaholics on BBC Two. The series aired in April 2015. She replaced Mel Giedroyc who hosted the first series in 2014.

== Other work ==
Harman is a writer and commentator on topics such as overseas property, travel and homes, and has written for the magazines Company, Living Abroad and My Travel. She was the resident travel columnist at Look magazine, and a contributor to A Place in the Sun magazine. She appears at A Place in the Sun Live giving tips for buying property abroad. Harman is also a regular on BBC Radio Kent where she joins PJ and Harris for the Sunday Supplement.

== Personal life ==
Harman is the eldest of seven children, with two half siblings on her father's side, and one half sibling on her mother's. She was a vegetarian from a very young age and has been vegan since 2014.

== Charity work ==
Harman has supported a number of charity projects, including becoming a celebrity waiter in aid of the Nelson Mandela Children's Fund, trading billions of pounds on the stock market to raise money for Breast Cancer Care and, in March 2010, dog sledding in Lapland for the Dogs Trust. In April 2010, Harman was one of a number of celebrities who participated in a nude photo shoot in aid of Cancer Research UK.
