= Siobhan Daly =

British producer and artistic director

Siobhán Daly
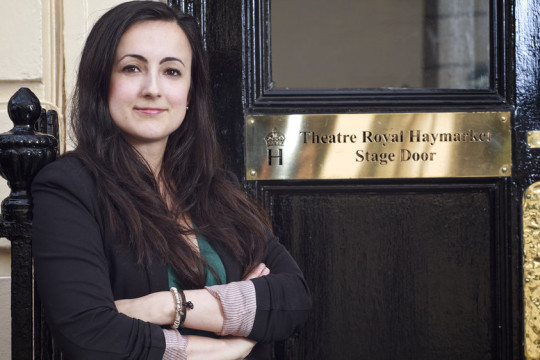
- Occupations: Producer; Artistic Director

Siobhán Daly is a British producer and artistic director.

== Education ==
Daly attended St Edmund's College, Ware, a boarding school in Hertfordshire.

She is a graduate of the University of Oxford, the Royal Academy of Dramatic Art (RADA), King’s College London, and Goldsmiths, University of London.

Daly is the granddaughter of Mayor Edward Daly.

== Career ==
=== Theatre ===
Daly has had a distinguished career in theatre, most notably as Associate Producer at the Theatre Royal Haymarket, where she oversaw the expansion and development of TRH Productions. Her work included the world premiere of Fatal Attraction (play), co-produced with Robert Fox, directed by Sir Trevor Nunn, and adapted by James Dearden. The production starred Natascha McElhone, Kristin Davis, and Mark Bazeley.

As part of her commitment to nurturing emerging talent, Daly was a member of the panel for the Pitch Your Play initiative in 2013, which provided young playwrights the opportunity to workshop their work and perform on the Haymarket’s stage. She also participated in the Ask an Expert programme at TheatreCraft 2013, held at the Royal Opera House and launched by director Jamie Lloyd.

In 2011, she founded Grassroots Shakespeare London, a multi Offie-nominated company. As artistic director and Executive Producer, she led the company to notable successes, including their residency at Leicester Square Theatre in January 2016 — the first permanent residency for a Shakespeare company in the West End since the Royal Shakespeare Company.

Their production of Twelfth Night, starring Ellie Nunn and John Pickard, was part of the nationwide Shakespeare 400 celebrations in 2016. As an extension of this, Daly produced a 14-hour live broadcast of Twelfth Night from central London in collaboration with Periscope, Twitter, and GoPro, which included scenes from the Middle Temple, the location of the original performance of the play. The broadcast attracted widespread attention for its innovative approach to combining live theatre and digital media.

Grassroots Shakespeare London performed at the Royal Shakespeare Company's World Shakespeare Festival, and celebrated Shakespeare's 450th birthday with a sold-out production of Othello in 2014 at Leicester Square Theatre, featuring Nari Blair-Mangat and James Alexandrou. The production was featured on the BBC World Service's The Why Factor programme.

Daly has worked at the Royal Opera House overseeing collaborations with The Royal Ballet and The Royal Opera on major projects, including the BP Big Screens live broadcasts into Trafalgar Square and throughout the UK, and the International Olympic Committee (IOC)'s Opening Ceremony for London's 2012 Olympics, executive produced by Wayne McGregor and starring Plácido Domingo, Renée Fleming, Bryn Terfel, Paloma Faith and Kate Prince's ZooNation.

Daly was identified as one of Britain's top young commercial producers by SOLT/ TMA, one of only six people selected to train on their Stage One scheme in 2013. She worked, both touring and in the West End, with Edward Snape on the Olivier Awards winning productions of Goodnight Mister Tom, The 39 Steps and The Ladykillers.

She produced the 5 star, sell-out Edinburgh Festival hit production of Manfred Karge's Man to Man in 2015.

Daly was a judge for the Olivier Awards, sitting on the Opera Panel, for the 2013–2014 and 2016–2017 seasons.

=== Film and TV ===
Daly has worked extensively at the BBC including for BBC Drama Production on the long-running series Casualty and alongside BAFTA-winning drama producer and director Pier Wilkie, BBC Events on live outdoor broadcasts, and in Commissioning for BBC Daytime. Productions for BBC Events included Live Earth at Wembley Stadium headlined by Madonna, working alongside Clarence House for the Concert for Diana at Wembley starring Elton John, Children in Need appeal nights, and major events such as The State Opening of Parliament and Elizabeth II's Royal Christmas message .

She has worked on numerous commercials and music videos for artists including Hot Chip, Lenny Kravitz, Kylie Minogue, Franz Ferdinand, Goldfrapp, Lily Allen, James Blunt, and more. In 2015, she worked with BAFTA Award-winning director Daniel Mulloy on his film Home, which starred Jack O'Connell and Holliday Grainger. The film premiered at the South by Southwest (SXSW) Film Festival and won the BAFTA for Best British Short Film in 2017.

Daly has a background as an actor, with credits including ITV's The Battle of Britain and performing in the 2011 Olivier Award-winning production of Puccini's La bohème at the Soho Theatre in London.

In 2016, Daly was jury-selected by BAFTA to join BAFTA Crew, a scheme that identifies the UK's top film and TV talent.

=== Academic ===
Daly is an active member of the University of Oxford's Oxford and Empire Network, an interdisciplinary initiative dedicated to examining the historical and contemporary impacts of imperialism on the university and beyond.

In addition to her role within the network, Daly has co-organised and lectured in the Oxford and Empire: Travel and Translation lecture series, hosted by the Oxford Research Centre in Humanities (TORCH). This series engages with critical issues surrounding the intersection of empire, travel, and cultural exchange.

She has also presented conference papers at several universities, including the University of Durham, University of London, University of Birmingham, and University of Surrey, contributing to ongoing academic discourse in her field.

=== Philanthropy ===
Daly served as Chair of the English National Opera (ENO) Young Patrons, a role in which she was supported by Sir Peter Bazalgette during his tenure as Chair of the ENO, and Sir Vernon Ellis, the ENO’s President.
