= Laurie Nunn =

English screenwriter and playwright

- Born: May 1986 (age 40); London, England
- Occupations: Screenwriter; playwright
- Father: Trevor Nunn
- Relatives: Ellie Nunn (half-sister)

Laurie Nunn (born May 1986) is an English screenwriter and playwright. She is best known for creating the Netflix comedy-drama series Sex Education (2019–2023).

== Early life ==
Nunn was born in London in May 1986, the daughter of Australian actress Sharon Lee-Hill and English theatre director Trevor Nunn. Her parents divorced in 1991. She has a sister, an older half-brother from her father's previous marriage to actress Janet Suzman, and a younger half-sister named Ellie and younger half-brother from her father's later marriage to actress Imogen Stubbs. Ellie is an actress. At the age of 14, Nunn moved to Australia to live with her mother. She earned a BA in Film and Television from Melbourne's Victorian College of the Arts in 2007, then returned to England and earned an MA in Screenwriting at the National Film and Television School in 2012.

== Career ==
Nunn's first full play, King Brown (2017), earned her a place on the shortlist for the Bruntwood Prize for Playwriting. She went on to create the Netflix comedy-drama series Sex Education (2019–2023).
