= Nancy Hewins =

British theatre director and actress

- Born: Margaret Nancy Hewins; 14 February 1902; London
- Died: 17 January 1978 (aged 75); Oxford
- Occupation: theatre director
- Known for: leading Britain's first all-woman theatre group

Margaret Nancy Hewins (14 February 1902 – 17 January 1978) was a British theatre director and actress. She founded the first all-woman theatre troupe who toured the UK presenting Shakespeare particularly to schools.

== Life ==
Hewins was born in London. Her parents were Margaret (born) and William Hewins. She had a brother and a sister. Her godmother was Beatrice Webb (her father had been appointed to be the director of the London School of Economics in 1895 by Sidney Webb.

She became interested in the theatre while she was at St Hugh's College in Oxford. In 1924 she graduated and set up an amateur theatre company called Isis.

She founded the first British professional all-woman set of players named "Osiris" in 1927. She was helped by £40 which Lord Rothermere gave her to help. Rothermere was a friend of her fathers. The troupe toured in two Rolls-Royces because Hewins said that they were big enough to take them and their props and they were reliable.

The troupe toured the UK presenting Shakespeare particularly to schools. The troupe was never larger than seven women and they were the actors and the crew. The troupe would sleep on the floor of village halls as the budget never stretched to paying for board and lodging. She had a few actors who were the core of the troupe but most would be employed for a couple of years and then they would be replaced as they could not endure the conditions of the employment. The troupe never received grants but survived on its own fortunes. Hewins would occasionally take work as a lighting expert for other productions. She worked for pageants and for the director Edy Craig. Others found Craig abrupt, but Hewins welcomed her direct criticism.

== Death and legacy ==
Hewins died in 1978 in Oxford and the players were disbanded by former Osiris member Wynne Griffiths. Her troupe had toured throughout England but they never appeared in the West End. In 2004 Imogen Stubbs play "We Happy Few" was performed at the London's Gielgud Theatre. The play was based on Hewins and her troupe's life during the second world war. A production of "Much Ado About Nothing" was inspired by Hewins. It was directed by Brigid Larmour at the Watford Palace Theatre in 2018 and it was set during WWII and included an all-woman cast.
