= I'm a Celebrity...Get Me Out of Here! (British TV series) series 23 =

I'm a Celebrity...Get Me Out of Here!
- Series 23
- Presented by: Anthony McPartlin; Declan Donnelly
- No. of days: 23
- No. of castaways: 12
- Winner: Sam Thompson
- Runner-up: Tony Bellew
- Location: Murwillumbah, New South Wales, Australia
- No. of episodes: 23

Release
- Original network: ITV1
- Original release: 19 November – 10 December 2023

Series chronology
- ← Previous; Series 22 Next → Series 24

I'm a Celebrity...Get Me Out of Here! returned for its 23rd series on 19 November 2023 on ITV. The series was filmed in Murwillumbah, New South Wales, with Ant & Dec returning to present the series.

On 10 December 2023, Sam Thompson was declared the winner of the series, and ultimately the new "King of the Jungle", with Tony Bellew and Nigel Farage finishing in second and third place respectively.

== Production ==
Following the conclusion of the twenty-second series, ITV confirmed an "All-Stars" series I'm a Celebrity...South Africa featuring previous contestants, which aired earlier in 2023 and was won by Myleene Klass. The first trailer for the twenty-third series aired in October 2023, which featured a ten-second clip of presenters Ant & Dec working at a luxury "Jungle Retreat" and with an added voiceover speaking the words "Come away with us [to the Jungle Retreat]".

A further extended trailer was released a week later, teasing the series as a peaceful and relaxing setting fit for a celebrity with Ant & Dec undertaking jobs such as pouring mealworms into a bath. It also included a voiceover describing the eating trials as "exotic cuisine" and enticing celebrities to join the "ultimate jungle experience". The trailer also features a five-star "Jungle Retreat" sign as well as an aerial view of the beach overseeing Ant & Dec writing the words "Get Me Out of He[re]" in the sand.

== Celebrities ==
The original line-up was announced by ITV on 13 November 2023. On 22 November 2023, Frankie Dettori and Tony Bellew were confirmed as this year's late arrivals. Grace Dent and Jamie Lynn Spears both withdrew from the series due to "medical grounds" on 27 and 29 November respectively.

The series had the second all male final in the show’s history, the first being the fourth series in 2004.

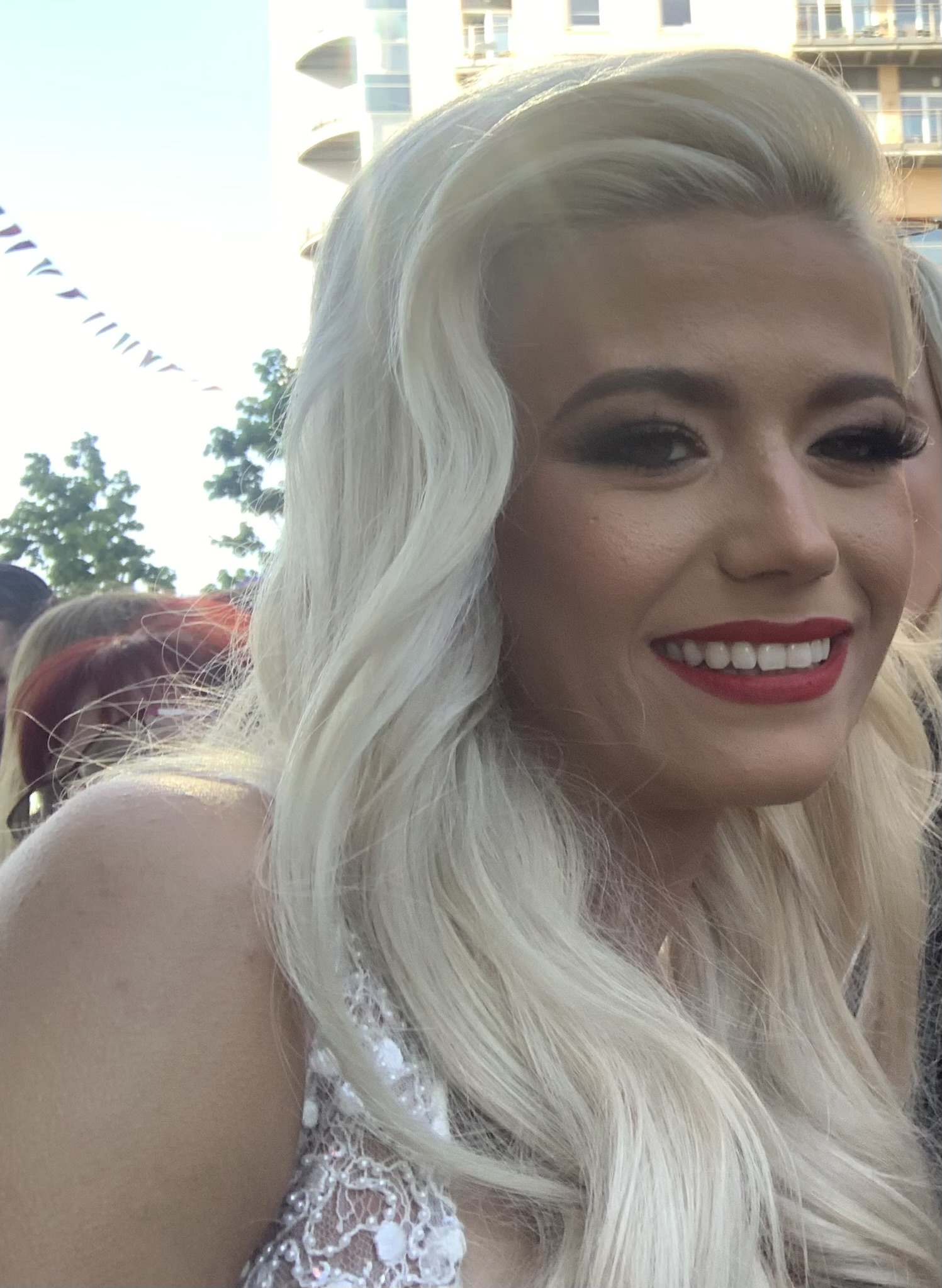
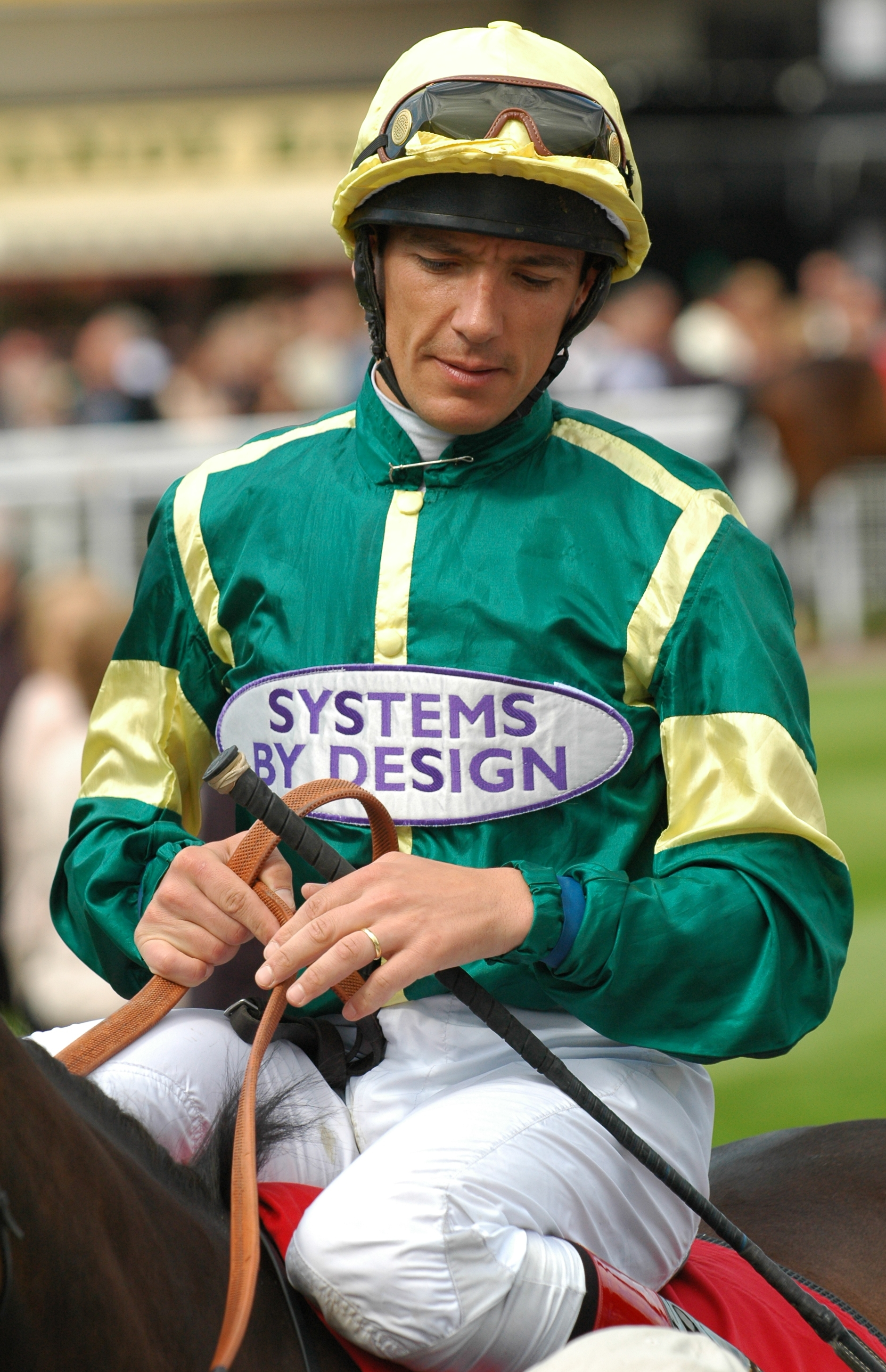
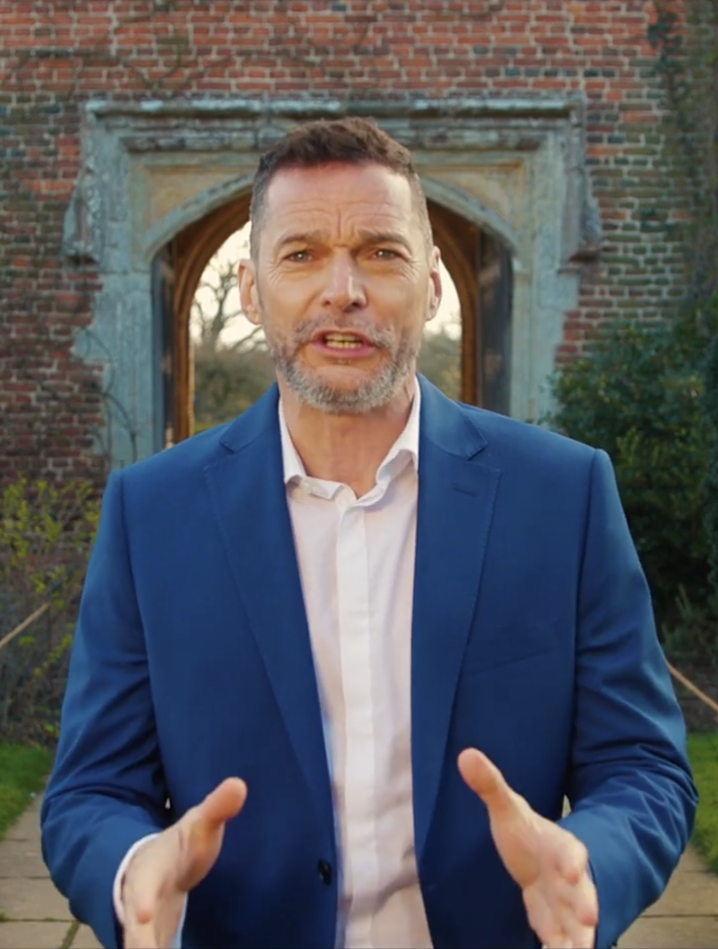
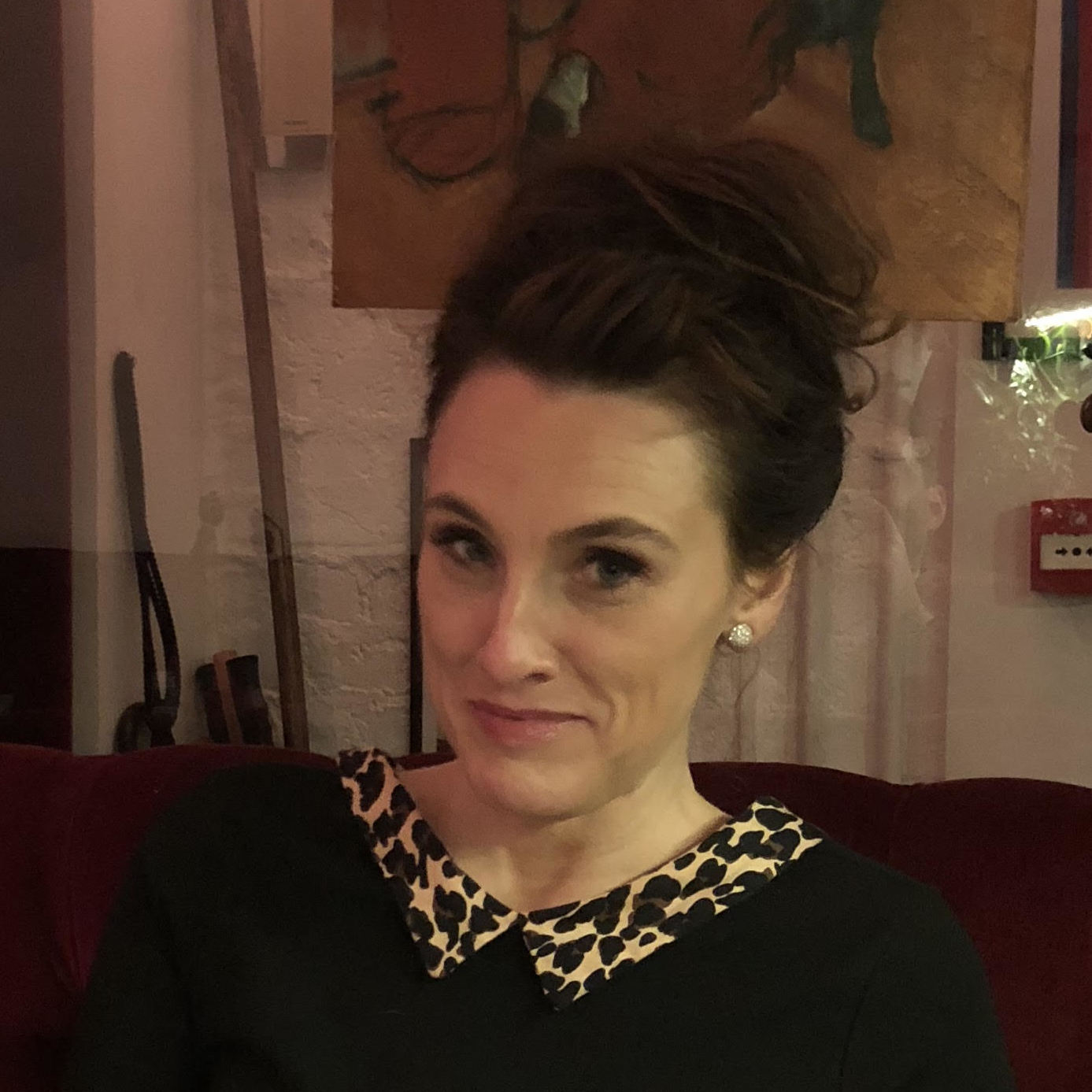
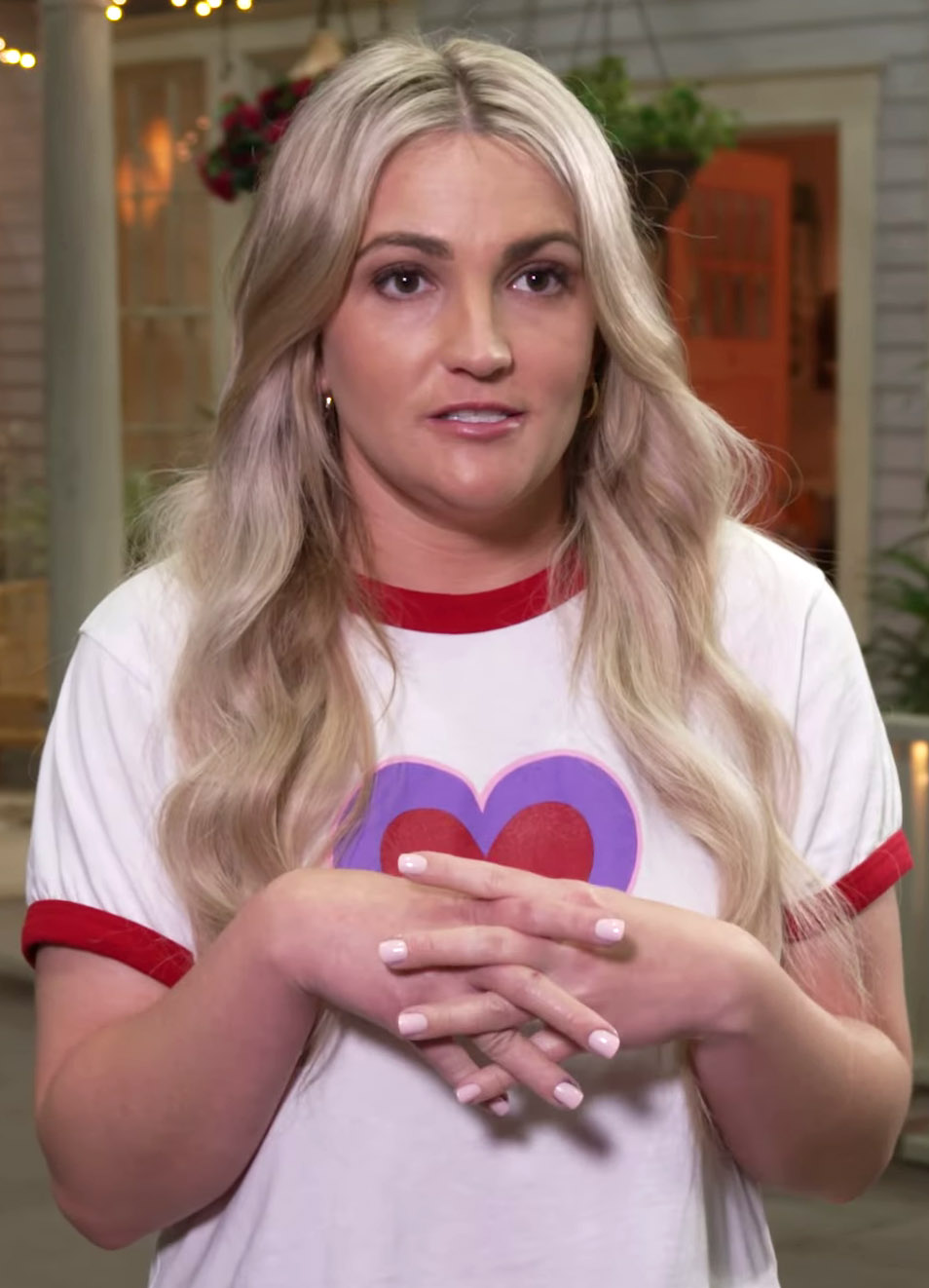
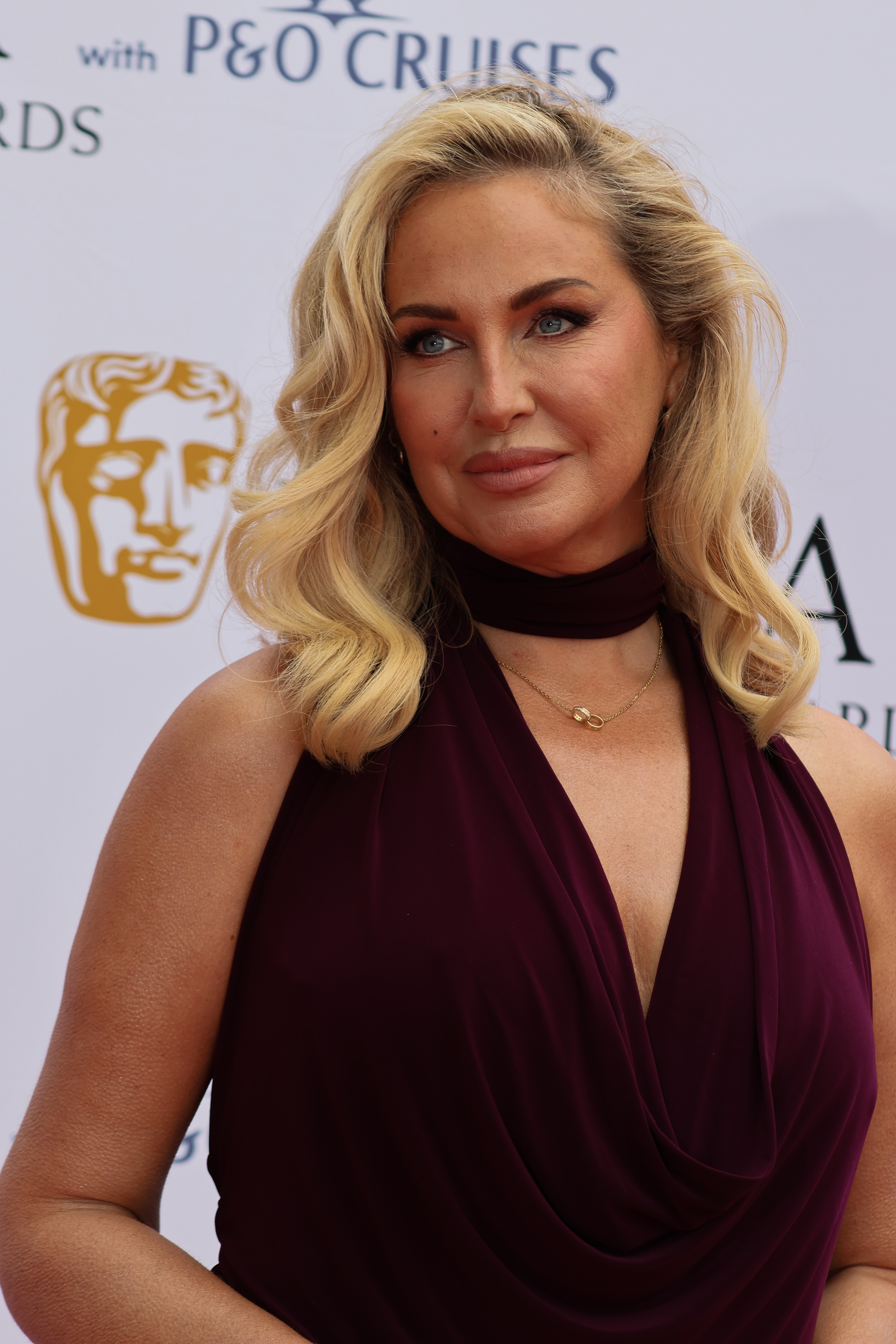
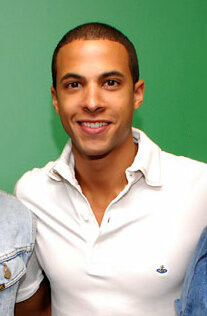
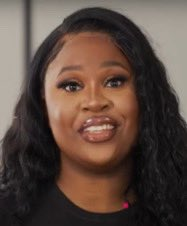
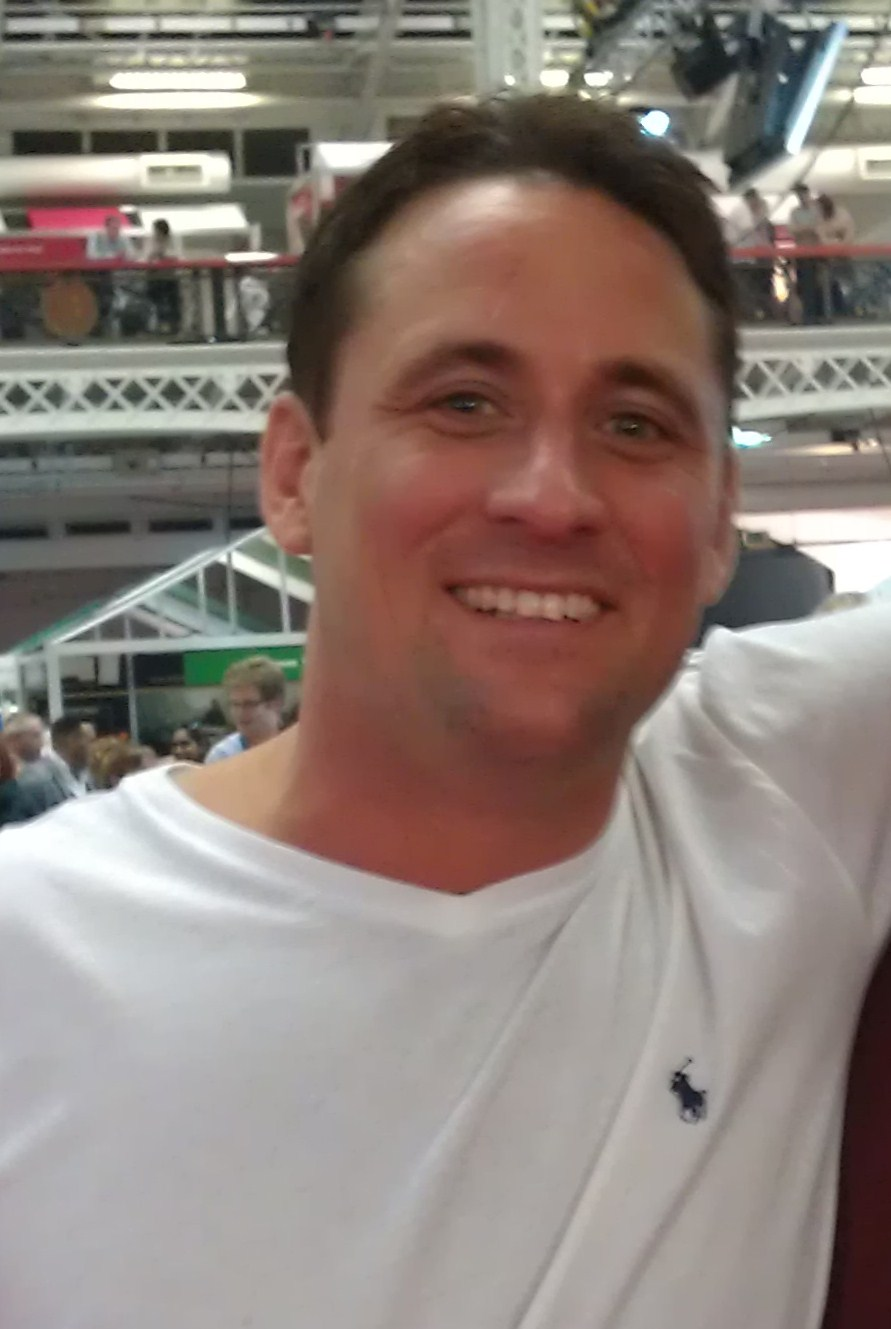
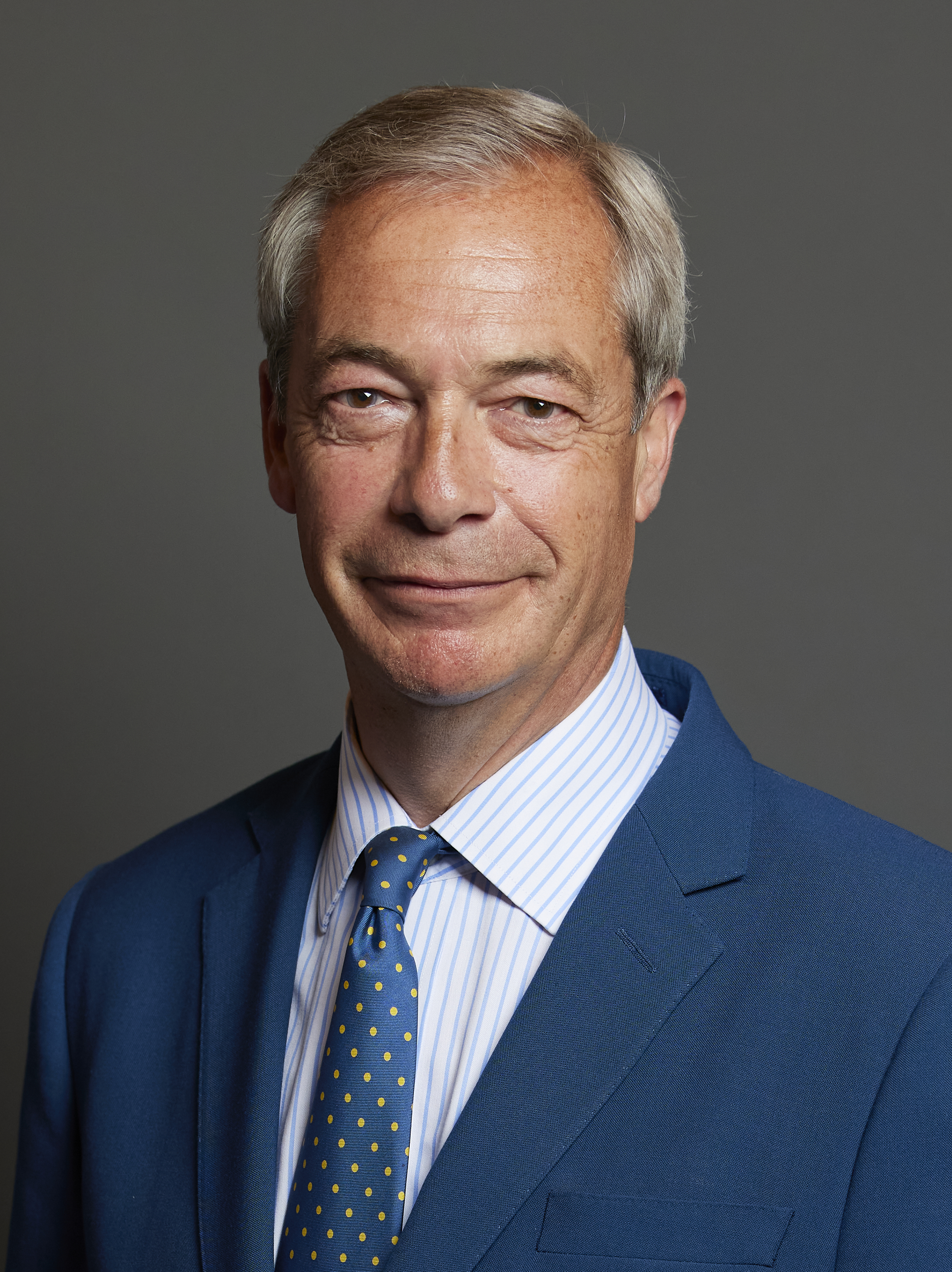
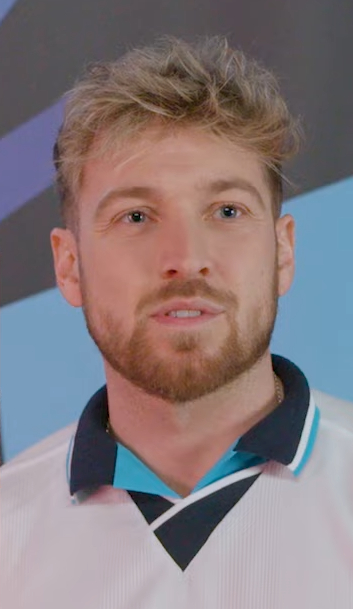
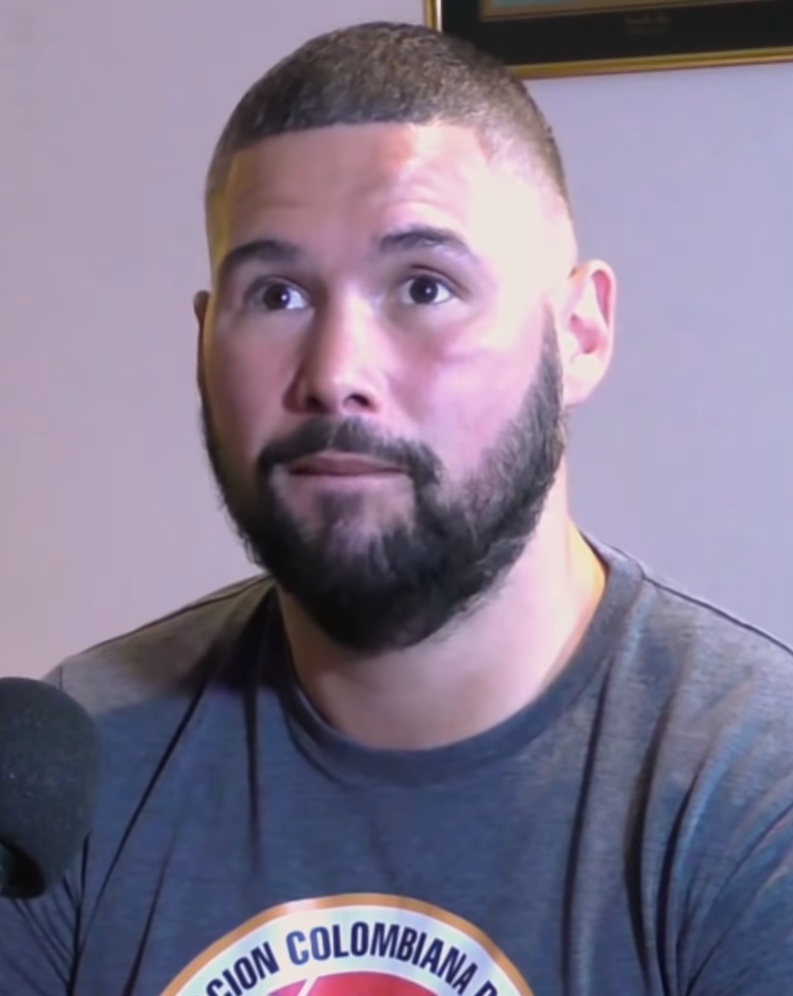
From left to right: Danielle Harold, Frankie Dettori, Fred Sirieix, Grace Dent, Jamie Lynn Spears, Josie Gibson, Marvin Humes, Nella Rose, Nick Pickard, Nigel Farage, Sam Thompson and Tony Bellew.

Celebrity	Known for	Status
Sam Thompson	TV personality and radio presenter	Winner on 10 December 2023
Tony Bellew	Former professional boxer	Runner-up on 10 December 2023
Nigel Farage	Former UKIP politician and broadcaster	Third place on 10 December 2023
Josie Gibson	This Morning presenter and Big Brother 11 winner	Eliminated 7th on 9 December 2023
Marvin Humes	JLS singer and presenter	Eliminated 6th on 8 December 2023
Danielle Harold	Former EastEnders actress	Eliminated 5th on 7 December 2023
Nick Pickard	Hollyoaks actor	Eliminated 4th on 6 December 2023
Fred Sirieix	First Dates maître d'hôtel	Eliminated 3rd on 5 December 2023
Nella Rose	YouTube personality	Eliminated 2nd on 4 December 2023
Frankie Dettori	Horse racing jockey	Eliminated 1st on 3 December 2023
Jamie Lynn Spears	Zoey 101 actress	Withdrew on 29 November 2023
Grace Dent	Columnist and restaurant critic	Withdrew on 27 November 2023

== Results and elimination ==
Indicates that the celebrity received the most votes from the public, and was crowned the winner
Indicates that the celebrity received the 2nd most votes from the public, and was the runner up
Indicates that the celebrity received the most votes from the public
Indicates that the celebrity received the fewest votes and was eliminated immediately (no bottom two)
Indicates that the celebrity was named as being in the bottom two

Daily results per celebrity
Celebrity	Day 15	Day 16	Day 17	Day 18	Day 19	Day 20	Day 21	Day 22		Trials	Deals on Wheels challenges
Celebrity	Day 15	Day 16	Day 17	Day 18	Day 19	Day 20	Day 21	Round 1	Round 2	Trials	Deals on Wheels challenges
Sam	Safe	Safe	Safe	Safe	Safe	Safe	Safe	1st 43.35%	1st 56.64%	9	2
Tony	Safe	Safe	Safe	Safe	Bottom two	Safe	Safe	2nd 30.87%	2nd 43.36%	8	2
Nigel	Safe	Safe	Safe	Safe	Safe	Safe	Safe	3rd 25.78%	Eliminated (Day 22)	9	2
Josie	Safe	Safe	Safe	Bottom two	Safe	Bottom two	4th	Eliminated (Day 21)		4	4
Marvin	Safe	Bottom two	Safe	Safe	Safe	5th	Eliminated (Day 20)			7	0
Danielle	Safe	Safe	Bottom two	Safe	6th	Eliminated (Day 19)				4	1
Nick	Safe	Safe	Safe	7th	Eliminated (Day 18)					5	2
Fred	Safe	Safe	8th	Eliminated (Day 17)						5	1
Nella	Bottom two	9th	Eliminated (Day 16)							8	0
Frankie	10th	Eliminated (Day 15)								3	2
Jamie Lynn	Withdrew (Day 11)									3	0
Grace	Withdrew (Day 9)									3	0
Notes	None							1			
Bottom two (named in)	Frankie, Nella	Marvin, Nella	Danielle, Fred	Josie, Nick	Danielle, Tony	Josie, Marvin	None				
Eliminated	Frankie; Fewest votes to save	Nella; Fewest votes to save	Fred; Fewest votes to save	Nick; Fewest votes to save	Danielle; Fewest votes to save	Marvin; Fewest votes to save	Josie; Fewest votes to save	Nigel; 25.78% (out of 3)	Tony; 43.36% (out of 2)		
Eliminated	Frankie; Fewest votes to save	Nella; Fewest votes to save	Fred; Fewest votes to save	Nick; Fewest votes to save	Danielle; Fewest votes to save	Marvin; Fewest votes to save	Josie; Fewest votes to save	Nigel; 25.78% (out of 3)	Sam; 56.64% to win		

- ^Note 1: The public voted for who they wanted to win, rather than save.

== Bushtucker trials ==
The contestants take part in daily trials to earn food. These trials aim to test both physical and mental abilities. The winner is usually determined by the number of stars collected during the trial, with each star representing a meal earned by the winning contestant for their fellow campmates.

The public voted for who they wanted to face the trial
The contestants decided who would face the trial
The trial was compulsory and neither the public nor celebrities decided who took part

Trial number	Air date	Name of trial	Celebrity participation	Winners/ Number of stars	Notes
1	19 November	Pole Position	Danielle; Fred; Grace; Sam	4/4 stars	—N/a
2	19 November	Temple of Doom	Jamie Lynn; Marvin; Nick	6/6 stars	—N/a
3	20 November	Jungle Pizzeria	Nella; Nigel	9/10 stars	—N/a
4	21 November	No Time To Cry	Nella	3/10 stars	—N/a
5	22 November	Climb of Cruelty	Jamie Lynn	10/10 stars	1
6	23 November	The Scarena: Locker Shocker	Danielle; Fred; Grace; Jamie Lynn; Josie; Marvin; Nella; Nick; Nigel; Sam	Danielle; Fred; Jamie Lynn; Nella; Sam	2
7	23 November	The Scarena: Don't Drop the Ball	Frankie; Tony	Frankie	3
8	24 November	The Scarena: Touchdown of Terror	Grace; Nella	Grace; Nigel	4 5
8	24 November	The Scarena: Touchdown of Terror	Nigel; Sam	Grace; Nigel	4 5
9	25 November	The Scarena: Down Your Sorrows	Nigel; Tony	12/12 stars	6
10	26 November	Fishy Business	Nella; Sam	10/12 stars	—N/a
11	27 November	Down the Tubes	~~Grace~~; Danielle; Josie	10/12 stars	7 8
12	28 November	Misery Motel	Marvin; Sam; Tony	24/30 coins	9
13	28 November	Misery Motel: Dreaded Beds	Frankie; Nella	0/30 coins	9 10
14	29 November	In Too Deep	Nick; Nigel	6/11 stars	11
15	30 November	Barbaric Barbershop	Danielle; Frankie; Fred; Josie; Marvin	4/10 stars	—N/a
16	1 December	Grim Gutter	Nella; Nick; Nigel; Sam; Tony	6/10 stars	—N/a
17	2 December	Eaten Alive	Tony	9/10 stars	12
18	3 December	Fright at the Museum	Nella	9/10 stars	—N/a
19	4 December	Celebrity Distressing Rooms	Fred	7/9 stars	—N/a
20	5 December	Fly on the Wall	Fred; Marvin	5/8 stars	13
21	6 December	Critter Mixer	Marvin; Nick; Tony	6/7 stars	—N/a
22	7 December	No Time to Cry, Cry Harder	Sam	6/6 stars	—N/a
23	8 December	Have Yourself a Grotty Little Christmas	Marvin; Nigel	5/5 stars	—N/a
24	9 December	Celebrity Cyclone	Josie; Nigel; Sam; Tony	4/4 stars	—N/a
25	10 December	Stakeout	Tony	5/5 stars	14
26	10 December	Bushtucker Bonanza	Sam	5/5 stars	14
27	10 December	Panic Pit	Nigel	5/5 stars	14

- ^Note 1: Nella and Nigel were excluded from this trial on medical grounds.
- ^Note 2: Celebrities are competing against each other. The first five celebrities to complete the trial, would return to Main Camp.
- ^Note 3: Celebrities are competing head-to-head in order to "coach" the winning team, the winners of the previous trial, and go to Main Camp.
- ^Note 4: Frankie and Tony were excluded from this trial on the basis of being coaches.
- ^Note 5: The coaches chose an additional campmate to compete alongside those chosen by the public.
- ^Note 6: Danielle, Frankie, Fred, Jamie Lynn, Nella and Sam were excluded from this trial as they were in the winning Play-offs team.
- ^Note 7: Nella, Nigel and Tony were excluded from this trial on medical grounds.
- ^Note 8: As Grace was unable to participate in the trial for medical reasons, Danielle, who received the third highest number of votes, took part instead.
- ^Note 9: Instead of competing for stars, the celebrities competed for coins.
- ^Note 10: Due to already participating in the Misery Motel, Marvin, Sam and Tony were excluded from this trial.
- ^Note 11: Although eligible to be voted for the trial, at the time of the reveal, Nella was being seen by a medic and was therefore unable to take part and votes cast for her were subsequently voided.
- ^Note 12: Nella was excluded from this trial on medical grounds.
- ^Note 13: Nigel was excluded from this trial on medical grounds.
- ^Note 14: For this Trial, each celebrity were competing for starters, main courses, desserts, drinks, and treats of their choice.

== Star count ==
Celebrity	Number of stars earned	Percentage
Sam Thompson	35/41 stars	85%
Tony Bellew	42/48 stars	88%
Nigel Farage	47/57 stars	82%
Josie Gibson	18/26 stars	69%
Marvin Humes	26/36 stars	72%
Danielle Harold	18/26 stars	69%
Nick Pickard	24/34 stars	71%
Fred Sirieix	20/31 stars	65%
Nella Rose	37/52 stars	71%
Frankie Dettori	4/10 stars	40%
Jamie Lynn Spears	16/16 stars	100%
Grace Dent	4/4 stars	100%

== Deals on Wheels challenges ==
As well as competing in the Bushtucker trials, celebrities have to complete in "Deals on Wheels challenges" in order to earn treats for the camp. At least two celebrities are chosen to compete in the challenge. These are often mental challenges, rather than challenges including critters. They must complete the challenge they have been given in order to win 'Dingo Dollars'.

After completion of the challenge, the celebrities will take the Dingo Dollars and purchase a snack from Kiosk Kev, who for this series was located in an ice cream van, "Kev's Wallaby Whips". Before they are allowed to take the prize, the other celebrities back at the living quarters must answer a trivia question. If they get the question right, they will earn the treat, but if they get it wrong, the celebrities will go back empty-handed.

The celebrities got the question correct
The celebrities got the question wrong
No question was given, as the celebrities failed to complete the challenge in time.
No question was asked

Episode	Air date	Celebrities	Prize	Notes
2	20 November	Josie; Nick	Popcorn	—N/a
8	26 November	Frankie; Nick	Milk bottles	—N/a
11	29 November	Danielle; Fred	Crisps	—N/a
12	30 November	Sam; Tony	Tim Tams	—N/a
14	2 December	Frankie; Josie	Crumpets and butter	—N/a
18	6 December	Josie; Nigel	Chocolate biscuits	—N/a
21	9 December	Josie; Nigel; Sam; Tony	Ice cream	—N/a

== Camp Leaders ==
Celebrity			Original Run		No. of days
	Leader	Deputy	First day	Last day	No. of days
1	Sam	Marvin	9	13	5
2	Nella	Danielle	13	16	4
3	Danielle	Josie	16	19	4

== Play-offs ==
On 23 November, following the campmates' entrance to The Scarena and their subsequent participation in "Locker Shocker", the campmates were separated in to two teams with the winning five forming the "Home" team and the losing five forming the "Away" team. New arrivals Frankie and Tony entered camp and competed in a trial to determine who would coach each team. Once separated into two camps, the teams went head-to-head in play-offs to win points. At the end of the three play-offs, the "Home" team amassed the most points and were therefore awarded with a breakfast.

The Away team won the play-off
The Home team won the play-off

Teams							
Teams	Home		Away				
Teams	404		383				
Teams	Frankie; Danielle; Fred; Jamie Lynn; Nella; Sam		Tony; Grace; Josie; Marvin; Nick; Nigel				
Play off number	Air date	Name of play-off	Celebrity participation				Notes
Play off number	Air date	Name of play-off	Home		Away		Notes
1	23 November	Slam Dunk'd	Fred; Nella	41	36	Marvin; Nick	—N/a
2	24 November	Power Shower	Danielle; Jamie Lynn	137	216	Josie; Marvin	—N/a
3	24 November	Hand Ball	Frankie; Fred	404	383	Nick; Tony	—N/a

== Ratings ==
Official ratings are taken from BARB, utilising the four-screen dashboard which includes viewers who watched the programme on laptops, smartphones and tablets within 7 days of the original broadcast.

Episode	Air date	Official rating (millions incl. HD & +1)	Weekly rank for all UK TV channels
1	19 November	10.24	1
2	20 November	9.60	1
3	21 November	9.16	4
4	22 November	9.30	3
5	23 November	9.41	2
6	24 November	8.63	7
7	25 November	8.25	9
8	26 November	8.60	8
9	27 November	8.59	2
10	28 November	8.03	4
11	29 November	8.21	3
12	30 November	7.89	6
13	1 December	7.67	8
14	2 December	7.78	7
15	3 December	7.93	5
16	4 December	8.04	4
17	5 December	7.91	5
18	6 December	7.32	9
19	7 December	7.38	8
20	8 December	7.67	7
21	9 December	7.77	6
22	10 December	8.43	3
Series average	2023	8.36	—N/a
Coming Out	13 December	5.26	5
