= Jamie's Dream School =

British television series

- Created by: Jamie Oliver
- Starring: Jamie Oliver
- Country of origin: United Kingdom
- Original language: English
- No. of series: 1
- No. of episodes: 7

Production
- Running time: 60 minutes
- Production company: Fresh One Productions

Original release
- Network: Channel 4
- Release: 2 March – 13 April 2011

Jamie's Dream School is a seven-part British television documentary series made by Fresh One Productions, first aired on Channel 4. In it, Jamie Oliver enrols a group of teenagers with fewer than five GCSEs into his "Dream School" – a school in which lessons are taught by celebrities who are specialists in particular subjects. Both pupils and teachers gave evidence to the Education Select Committee in June 2011.

The lessons from the show are available through a dedicated YouTube channel, which features David Starkey's history course and Simon Callow's drama lessons.

== The school ==
An empty building was converted into a school for two months. On the grounds, a biosphere was constructed for lessons on the environment.

=== Teachers ===
- Head Teacher: John D'Abbro, OBE
- Art: Rolf Harris
- Cooking: Jamie Oliver OBE
- Cricket: Michael Vaughan OBE
- Diving: Daley Thompson CBE
- English: Simon Callow CBE
- History: Dr David Starkey CBE
- Latin: Prof. Dame Mary Beard DBE
- Law (Human Rights): Cherie Blair, CBE
- Maths: Alvin Hall
- Music: Jazzie B, OBE
- Photography: John "Rankin" Waddell
- Poetry: Sir Andrew Motion
- Politics: Alastair Campbell
- Sailing: Dame Ellen MacArthur DBE
- Science (Biology): Prof. Lord Winston
- Science (Environment): Jane Poynter

=== Pupils ===
- Angelique — Age 17
- Aysha — Age 17
- Codie— Age 18
- Charlotte — Age 17
- Chloe — Age 17
- Conor — Age 17
- Danielle — Age 18
- Emily Brown — Age 16
- Georgia — Age 18
- Harlem-Iaren — Age 18
- Henry — Age 17
- Jake — Age 16
- Jamal — Age 18
- Jenny — Age 16
- Jourdelle — Age 18
- Latoya — Age 19
- Michael — Age 18
- Nana Kwame — Age 18
- Ricki — Age 16
- Ronnie — Age 18

== International adaptations ==
A South African and an American adaptation were aired in late 2013.

A Dutch version of 8 episodes (and a reunion episode seven months later) followed in early 2017 on public broadcaster Omroep NTR hosted by kickboxing-champion Lucia Rijker and headmaster Eric van 't Zelfde. The first season included Maarten van Rossem, Karin Bloemen and Peter R. de Vries as celebrity-teachers. A second season (10 episodes) started on 26 February 2018. Teachers were Eva Jinek, Duncan Stutterheim and Joseph Klibansky among others.The third series (11 episodes and a reunion 9 months later) started on 18 February 2019. Floortje Dessing, Trijntje Oosterhuis, Wilfred Genee, Ahmet Polat and Lodewijk Asscher and others were teaching the class of season three. The fourth season, of 13 episodes, started on 3 March 2020. Klaas Dijkhoff, Jimmy Nelson, Hanneke Groenteman and Sylvana Simons were some of the teachers.
