= Nick Pickard =

English actor (born 1975)

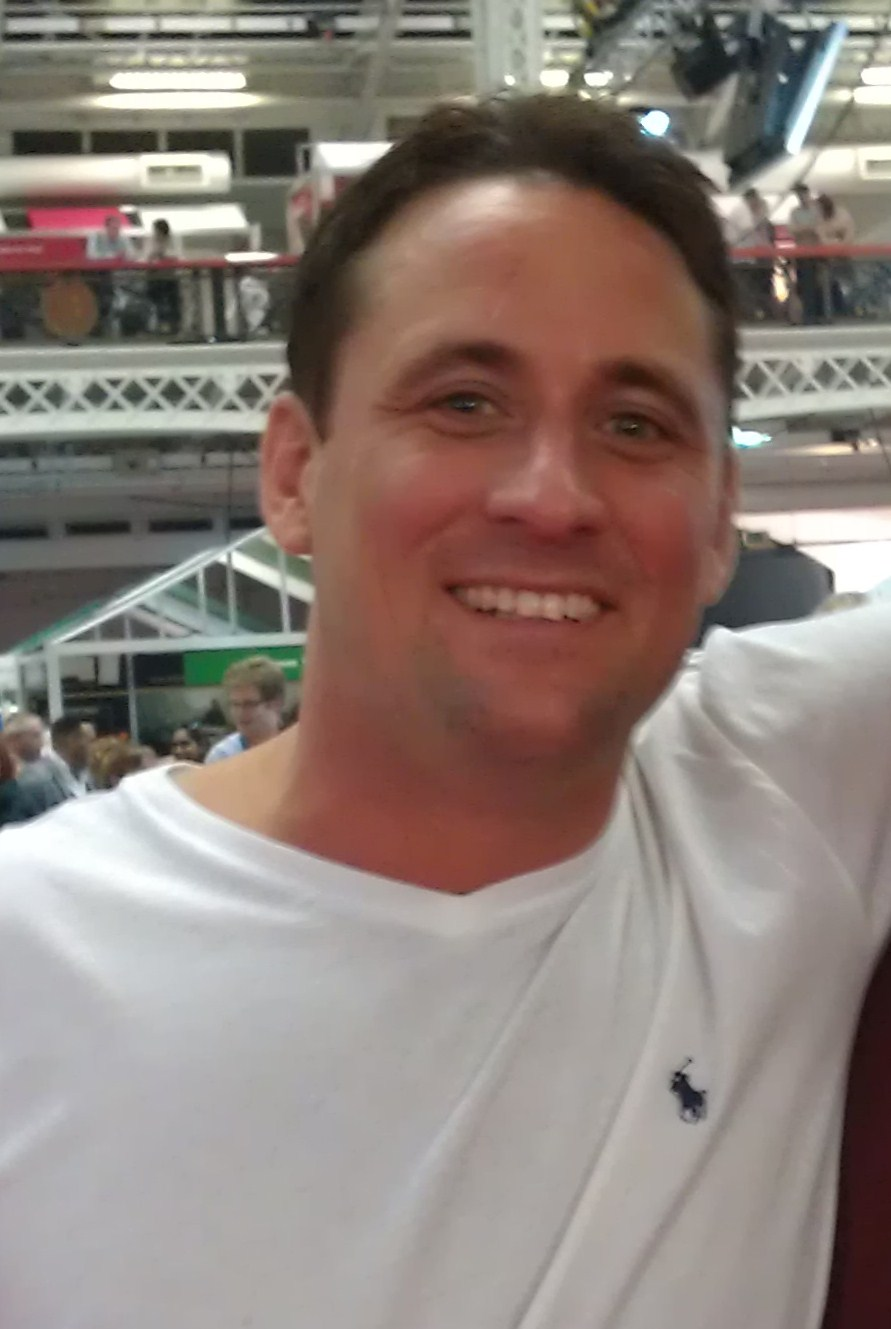
- Nick Pickard at Masterchef Live 2011
- Born: Surrey, England
- Occupation: Actor
- Years active: 1987–present
- Known for: Role of Tony Hutchinson in Hollyoaks
- Children: 1
- Relatives: John Pickard (brother)

Nick Pickard is an English actor. He is known for his portrayal of Tony Hutchinson in the Channel 4 soap opera Hollyoaks, a role he has held since its first episode in 1995; he remains the longest-serving cast member and, in 2017, won the British Soap Award for Outstanding Achievement.

== Early life ==
As a child he attended the Corona Theatre School in Hammersmith, followed by Sylvia Young Theatre School.

== Career ==
In his acting debut, Pickard played Mio, the lead role in Mio in the Land of Faraway (1987), starring alongside a young Christian Bale, where he was credited as Nicholas Pickard. In 1993, Pickard played a minor role in EastEnders, appearing as a young homeless boy. In addition, Pickard has appeared in other television programmes, including Us Girls and If You Were Me. He appeared in music videos for "Over My Shoulder" (for Mike + The Mechanics) and "Almost Unreal" (for Roxette).

He landed the role of Tony Hutchinson in Hollyoaks in 1995, becoming a member of the original cast. He remains in the role to date, and has since become the longest-serving cast member, having played the part since the inaugural episode. Over the years, Pickard has been nominated for a number of awards independently and some nominations with colleagues. In 2017, Pickard won the British Soap Award for Outstanding Achievement in honour of his achievement of playing the role for 22 years.

In 2005, Pickard's brother John joined the cast of Hollyoaks, portraying the role of Dominic Reilly, the half-brother of Tony. When John left the programme in 2010, The Daily Star released a news article claiming that Pickard was set to follow in his brother's footsteps and depart Hollyoaks, stating that he was "disgusted" with his brother's "axing". However, Pickard denied these reports, confirming that he was happy and had no intentions to leave the soap. Pickard has appeared in theatre productions including Richard II, An Enemy of the People and Edward II. He also joined the cast of the 2009 pantomime adaption of Cinderella at Liverpool Empire Theatre, where he portrayed Dandini. His break from Hollyoaks to perform in Cinderella was planned and written into the show.

In 2011, Pickard participated in the sixth series of Celebrity MasterChef, where he reached the final though lost out to Phil Vickery. In 2016, he once again participated in a game show, appearing in an episode of Pointless Celebrities, playing the game in a partnership with his Hollyoaks colleague Alex Fletcher.

In November 2023, he participated in the twenty-third series of I'm a Celebrity...Get Me Out of Here! and, on 6 December, was the 4th celebrity to be eliminated from the show.

== Filmography ==
Year	Title	Role	Notes	
1987	Mio in the Land of Faraway	Mio / Bosse	Film. Credited as Nicholas Pickard	
1988	Erasmus Microman	Ben	7 episodes	
1990	You Rang, M'Lord?	Boy Factory Worker	2 episodes. Credited as Nicholas Pickard	
1991	Now That It's Morning	Ian	Short film. Credited as Nicholas Pickard	
1992	Us Girls	Sean	3 episodes. Credited as Nicholas Pickard	
1992	GamesMaster	Himself - Contestant	Series 2, episode 3	
1993	Roxette:Almost Unreal	Young man	Music video	
1993	The Real McCoy	Son	Series 3, episode 1	
1993, 1994	EastEnders	Down and Out / Young Vagrant	2 episodes. Credited as Nicholas Pickard	
1994	Grange Hill	Mark	Series 17, episode 18	
1995	Mike + The Mechanics: Over My Shoulder	Tony Hutchinson (Schoolboy in Love)	Music video	
1995–present	Hollyoaks	Tony Hutchinson	Regular role	
1999	Brookside: Double Take!	Rosco Main	Video	
2001	Hollyoaks: Movin' On	Tony Hutchinson	16 episodes	
2002	Blankety Blank	Himself - Guest	Series 17, episode 18	
2005	The Match	Himself		
2007	The Weakest Link	Himself - Contestant	Episode: "1019"	
2007	Soapstar Superchef	Himself - Contestant	2 episodes	
2007	Xposé	Himself	Series 1, episode 2	
2007	The British Soap Awards	Himself	TV Special	
2007	For King and Country	Captain Philip Levaul-Grimwood		
2008	Kidnap	Kidnapper	Film	
2008	All Star Family Fortunes	Himself - Contestant	Episode: "Hollyoaks vs. Emmerdale	
2009	Hollyoaks: The Good, The Bad & The Gorgeous	Tony Hutchinson / Jack Dawson		
2009–2013, 2020	Hollyoaks Later	Tony Hutchinson	9 episodes	
2011	Celebrity MasterChef	Himself - Contestant	Series 6, 5 episodes	
2011	Celebrity Juice	Himself - Contestant	Series 6, 2 episodes	
2012	Come Dine with Me	Himself - Contestant	Celebrity Christmas Special	
2015	Hollyoaks One Killer Week	Tony Hutchinson	Video	
2016, 2019	Pointless Celebrities	Himself - Contestant	Series 8, episode 16; Series 11, episode 36	
2019	Celebrity Antiques Road Trip	Himself - Contestant	Series 9, episode 12	
2026	Bridge of Lies	Himself - Contestant	Himself - Contestant	Series 8, episode 16; Series 11, episode 36
2023	I'm a Celebrity...Get Me Out of Here!	Himself - Contestant	Himself - Contestant	Series 23, 9 episodes
2023	Celebrity Mastermind	Series 22, episode 3	Himself - Contestant	

== Awards and nominations ==
Year	Award	Category/Recipient(s)	Result
2001	British Soap Awards	Best Comedy Performance – Hollyoaks	Nominated
2002	British Soap Awards	Best Comedy Performance – Hollyoaks	Nominated
2017	British Soap Awards	Outstanding Achievement – Hollyoaks	Won
