= Danielle Harold =

English actress (born 1992)

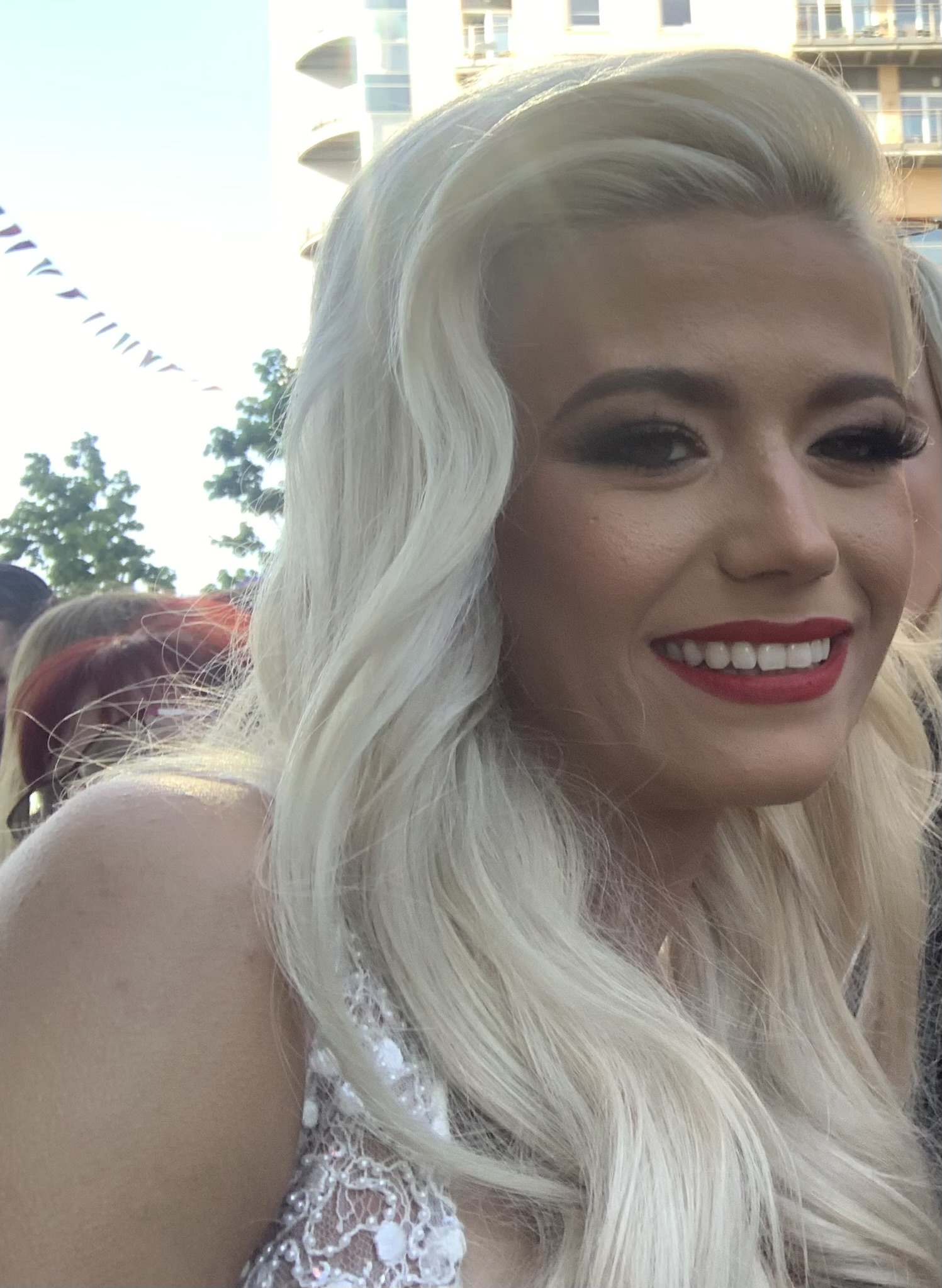
- Harold in 2023
- Born: Danielle Amy Harold; 30 May 1992 (age 34); Lewisham, London, England
- Occupation: Actress
- Years active: 2010–present
- Known for: Lola Pearce in EastEnders
- Television: Jamie's Dream School; EastEnders

Danielle Amy Harold (born 30 May 1992) is an English actress. She rose to prominence playing Lola Pearce in the BBC soap opera EastEnders. Her portrayal of Lola's glioblastoma brain tumour storyline, that ultimately resulted in the character's death, earned her a win at the National Television Awards for Serial Drama Performance and three nominations at the British Soap Awards, of which she won Best Leading Performer, as well as a TRIC award for Soap Actor and the Inside Soap award for Best Actress. She portrayed the character between 2011 and 2015, and again from 2019 until 2023, as well as appearing in occasional video recordings up until 2026. Following her exit from the soap, she became a contestant on the twenty-third series of I'm a Celebrity...Get Me Out of Here!.

== Early life ==
Danielle Amy Harold was born on 30 May 1992 in Lewisham, Greater London. Before Harold's acting career began, she was featured in the television series Jamie's Dream School. Harold got one GCSE as she had lost a year of school due to an illness and missed out on being able to study for exams.

On Jamie's Dream School, she was seen as one of the brightest of the students, and was rewarded by Jane Poynter and Robert Winston with the chance to stay in the biosphere which Poynter had lived in for two years. She was also given a tour of Cambridge University by David Starkey as he found her to be very intelligent and thought that it might be a good choice of university. However, she decided to study acting and auditioned for several roles.

== Career ==
=== EastEnders ===
In June 2011, EastEnders producers announced that Harold had been cast as Lola Pearce, the granddaughter of established characters Billy Mitchell (Perry Fenwick) and Julie Perkins (Cathy Murphy). She made her first appearance in EastEnders on 12 July 2011. Harold's first major storyline involved her character's pregnancy at the age of 15. In July 2012, the character gave birth in a special live broadcast, coinciding with her on-screen grandfather carrying the Olympic Torch through Walford. Harold is the first EastEnders actress to portray giving birth live on air, and the second British soap actress, after Coronation Street actress Jennie McAlpine. In June 2015, it was announced that Harold would be leaving EastEnders later that year.

In December 2018, it was announced that Harold would reprise her role of Lola Pearce. She returned to the series with her on-screen daughter, Lexi Pearce, in April 2019. Then in 2022, it was announced that Harold would be starring in a brain cancer storyline for Lola, which resulted in the character's death on 31 May 2023. After which, Harold continued to appear as Lola sporadically via the character's video diaries until 4 March 2026.

=== Other ventures ===
In November 2023, Harold appeared in an EastEnders special of The Weakest Link alongside several of her co-stars. The same month, she was announced as a contestant on the twenty-third series of I'm a Celebrity...Get Me Out of Here!. She was the fifth celebrity to be eliminated, finishing in sixth place. Harold also participated in the sixth series of Celebrity Hunted in 2024, which she filmed in 2023 following her exit from EastEnders.

== Filmography ==
Film
| Year | Title | Role |
|---|---|---|
| 2017 | Fanged Up | Katie Makepeace |
| 2018 | Pleasureland | Dina |
| 2018 | Two Graves | Leanne |
| 2018 | Monster | Sarah |
| 2018 | Dead Ringer | Melissa Prince |
| 2019 | The Tombs | The Presenter |
| 2020 | Next Door | Dani |

Television
| Year | Title | Role | Notes |
|---|---|---|---|
| 2011 | Jamie's Dream School | Herself | Main role |
| 2011–2015, 2019–2026 | EastEnders | Lola Pearce | Regular role |
| 2012 | Billy's Olympic Nightmare | Lola Pearce | Television special |
| 2012 | Pointless Celebrities | Herself – Contestant | Children in Need Special |
| 2013 | Children in Need | Street Dancer | 1 episode |
| 2017 | Casualty | Georgie Manning | Episode: "Roadman" |
| 2023 | The Weakest Link | Herself – Contestant | EastEnders Special |
| 2023 | I'm a Celebrity...Get Me Out of Here! | Herself – Contestant | Series 23 |
| 2024 | Celebrity MasterChef | Herself – Contestant | Series 19 |
| 2024 | Celebrity Bridge of Lies | Herself – Contestant | |
| 2025 | Celebrity Hunted | Herself – Contestant | Series 6, Stand Up to Cancer |
| 2025 | Celebrity Antiques Road Trip | Herself – Contestant | Series 13, Episode 11 |
| 2025 | Richard Osman's House of Games | Herself – Contestant | Series 8 |

== Awards and nominations ==
| Year | Organisation | Award | Work | Result | Ref. |
|---|---|---|---|---|---|
| 2012 | TVTimes Awards | Best Newcomer | EastEnders | Won | |
| 2013 | Inside Soap Awards | Best Actress | EastEnders | Nominated | |
| 2014 | The British Soap Awards | Sexiest Female | EastEnders | Nominated | |
| 2022 | Digital Spy Reader Awards | Best Soap Actor (Female) | EastEnders | Won | |
| 2023 | The British Soap Awards | Best Leading Performer | EastEnders | Won | |
| 2023 | The British Soap Awards | Best Dramatic Performance | EastEnders | Shortlisted | |
| 2023 | The British Soap Awards | Best On-Screen Partnership (with Jamie Borthwick) | EastEnders | Shortlisted | |
| 2023 | TRIC Awards | Soap Actor | EastEnders | Won | |
| 2023 | National Television Awards | Serial Drama Performance | EastEnders | Won | |
| 2023 | Inside Soap Awards | Best Actress | EastEnders | Won | |
| 2023 | TVTimes Awards | Favourite Soap Actor | EastEnders | Won | |
| 2023 | I Talk Telly Awards | Best Soap Performance | EastEnders | Won | |
| 2023 | Digital Spy Reader Awards | Best Soap Actor | EastEnders | Won | |
| 2023 | Digital Spy Reader Awards | Best Soap Couple (with Jamie Borthwick) | EastEnders | Second | |
| 2024 | TV Choice Awards | Best Soap Actress | EastEnders | Shortlisted | |
