= Nella Rose =

Belgian media personality (born 1997)

- Born: Ornella Rose Hollela; 20 July 1997 (age 29); Belgium
- Education: University of Leicester
- Occupations: Internet personality; social media influencer; presenter
- Years active: 2016–present

TikTok information
- Page: nellarose

YouTube information
- Channel: Nella Rose
- Genres: Beauty; fashion; lifestyle; vlog
- Subscribers: 1.35 million
- Views: 39.7 million
- Last updated: 25 October 2026

Ornella Rose Hollela (born 20 July 1997), known professionally as Nella, is a Belgian media personality. After setting up a YouTube channel, Rose embarked on a career in the media and has gone on to present Catfish UK, as well as the red carpet event at the Brit Awards. In 2023, she began fronting the Channel 4 digital series Tapped Out and also appeared as a contestant on the twenty-third series of I'm a Celebrity...Get Me Out of Here!.

== Early and personal life ==
Rose was born Ornella Rose Hollela on 20 July 1997 in Belgium to a family of Congolese descent. Her family emigrated to the United Kingdom when Nella was seven years old. In 2015, she began studying sociology at the University of Leicester, graduating with a 2:1. Rose has stated that she "did not want to go there at all" and would have preferred to get a job, but said she knew that "if she didn't study at university, her family would never let it go". Rose's mother died in 2016 (from a brain aneurysm) and her father died in 2020.

== Career ==
Whilst studying at university, Rose set up a YouTube channel to which she began uploading videos in 2016. Focusing primarily on vlogs, she also uploaded hair tutorials and fashion hauls. Rose said of her decision to make YouTube her main career option that "[She'd] had opportunities to interview celebrities, present at shows and go places [she] never could have." She also won the award for YouTuber of the Year at the PrettyLittleThing Influencer Awards.

In August 2019, Rose launched the podcast Pressed on BBC Radio 1Xtra alongside Adeola Patronne and Mariam Musa. In February 2022, Rose was the digital host for the red carpet live stream at the 2022 Brit Awards alongside Munya Chawawa. In April 2022, Rose appeared as guest on Amelia Dimoldenberg's YouTube series Chicken Shop Date. The same month, she was announced to be taking over from Julie Adenuga as the new presenter of the MTV reality series Catfish UK, alongside Oobah Butler. In June 2022, Rose announced a collaboration with the fashion retailer PrettyLittleThing, for which she launched a 40-piece summer collection. In November 2022, she appeared in an episode of Don't Hate the Playaz. The same month, she won the award for Best Media Personality at the MOBO Awards 2022.

In February 2023, Rose returned to host the red carpet live stream at the 2023 Brit Awards, this time with Michelle Visage. In May 2023, she began fronting the Channel 4.0 digital series Tapped Out in which Rose and her podcast co-hosts Patronne and Musa, along with Chloe Burrows, serve as practical jokers to see "who can last the longest in a range of hilarious and cringeworthy situations, aiming to execute the wildest pranks possible". In 2023, Rose participated in the twenty-third series of I'm a Celebrity...Get Me Out of Here!.

== Filmography ==
As herself
Year	Title	Role	Ref.
2022	Brit Awards 2022	Digital host	
2022–2024	Catfish UK	Presenter	
2022	Don't Hate the Playaz	Guest; 1 episode	
2022–present	Love Lessons	Digital series; host	
2023–present	Tapped Out	Digital series	
2023	Brit Awards 2023	Digital host	
2023	I'm a Celebrity...Get Me Out of Here!	Contestant; series 23	
2023–present	The Pink Courtroom	Digital series; co-host	
2026	Would You Rather: Decide To Survive?	Contestant; series 1	

== Podcasts ==
- Pressed (2021)

== Awards and nominations ==
Year	Ceremony	Award	Result	Ref.
2020	PrettyLittleThing Influencer Awards	YouTuber of the Year	Won	
2022	MOBO Awards 2022	Best Media Personality	Won	
