= We Happy Few (play) =

Imogen Stubbs' 2004 WWII play

- Original language: English
- Written by: Imogen Stubbs

Premiere
- Date: 2003
- Place: Malvern Theatres

We Happy Few is a 2004 play by Imogen Stubbs. It follows a group of female actors touring Shakespeare plays round the United Kingdom during World War II. It is based on Nancy Hewins' touring group, the Osiris Players. Its title quotes the St Crispin's Day Speech from Henry V.

== Premiere ==
Originally written and performed in 2003 at Malvern Theatres, it was further developed into the play which opened in London in 2004. The play was based on the Osiris Players who were the first professional all-woman theatre company founded by Nancy Hewins.

The play's London premiere was directed by Stubbs' husband Trevor Nunn at the Gielgud Theatre and starred Juliet Stevenson and Patsy Palmer. It opened on 29 June 2004 and was planned to run until November 2004, but poor audience figures and critical or mediocre reviews led to it closing at the end of July 2004. The play was again performed in Malvern in 2012.

=== Original cast ===
- Juliet Stevenson - Hettie Oaks, leader of the troupe
- Marcia Warren - Flora Pelmet, co-founder of the troupe
- Kate O'Mara - Helen, alcoholic children's radio presenter and frustrated actress
- Patsy Palmer - Charlotte, Cockney tomboy, latterly Rosalind's girlfriend
- Caroline Blakiston - Jocelyn, stage manager
- Paul Bentley - Reggie Pelmet, Flora's cousin
- Rosemary McHale - Gertrude, German Jewish refugee
- Adam Davy - Joseph Rosenbaum, Gertrude's son
- Cat Simmons - Ivy, Joseph's girlfriend
- Emma Darwall-Smith - Rosalind, new RADA graduate, Helen's daughter

=== Publication ===
The play was published (and is licensed for amateur performance) by Nick Hern Books, London.
