= Grassroots Shakespeare London =

British theatre company

Grassroots Shakespeare London is a British theatre company based in London, UK. The company specialises in producing accessible works of William Shakespeare inspired by using Elizabethan original theatre practices.

== Company history ==
Grassroots Shakespeare London was established in London in 2011.

The company's first production was A Midsummer Night's Dream, which performed in Hyde Park and Victoria Embankment Gardens. In December 2011, they performed The Merry Wives of Windsor at the New Red Lion Theatre and in 2012, they launched the theatre festival at The Scoop at More London with Much Ado About Nothing during HM The Queen's Diamond Jubilee celebrations. This production also played at the Dell Theatre, Royal Shakespeare Company as part of the World Shakespeare Festival 2012.

In August 2012 they devised a new production of Much Ado About Nothing for their summer residency at Victoria Embankment Gardens and were nominated for the 2012 Offies for Best Ensemble and Best Production. They also received recommendations from London newspaper The Evening Standard and Time Out.

In December 2012 to January 2013, the company performed a repertory season of A Midsummer Night's Dream and The Tempest. In 2013, the company presented a 'Summer of Love' repertory season of Love's Labour's Lost and Romeo and Juliet in Islington at the Old Red Lion Theatre.

In 2014 a sold out production of Othello was presented at the Leicester Square Theatre starring BBC actor James Alexandrou as Iago and Ian Charleson Award nominee Nari Blair-Mangat as Othello. They were the only company to be performing Shakespeare in London's West End for the 450th birthday celebrations, which also saw them perform with actor Damian Lewis at London's Guildhall. Rehearsals were recorded by BBC World Service and James Alexandrou's performance as Iago featured in their programme The Why Factor.

In 2016 the company was announced as the first ever resident theatre company at Leicester Square Theatre in London's West End. As part of Shakespeare 400, Grassroots performed Twelfth Night, starring Ellie Nunn as Viola and John Pickard as Sir Toby Belch throughout April - May 2016. They additionally produced a 14-hour live 'Dawn til Dusk' broadcast in association with the live-streaming app Periscope, Twitter and GoPro, which saw the company gain over 700,000 views on Twitter alone. In May 2016, the company performed speeches with Simon Russell Beale at Guildhall and subsequently viewed the 1623 First Folio, held at Guildhall Library, one of the top 5 quality editions left remaining in the world.

The company's Artistic Director and Executive Producer is Siobhán Daly.

== Notes and references ==
=== Sources ===
- Daly, Siobhan (13 June 2013). "Guest Blog: A Summer of Love with Grassroots Shakespeare London". West End Frame. Archived from the original on 14 April 2018.
- Loxton, Howard (2013a). "A Midsummer Night's Dream". British Theatre Guide.
- "Listings for 2012 at The Dell". The Royal Shakespeare Company. 7 June 2012. Archived from the original on 9 July 2012.
- "THE 2012 FINALISTS NOMINATED FOR THE OFFIE AWARDS". offwestend.com. 2013. Archived from the original on 24 September 2015.
- "Tonight's ticket: Five things to do for free". The Evening Standard. 2 August 2012.
- "The Tempest". Time Out. 5 December 2012.
- Ferris, Natalie (7 January 2013). "No-nonsense approach to the Bard: A Midsummer Night's Dream at the Lion and Unicorn Theatre". One Stop Arts. Archived from the original on 4 March 2016.
- Dalglish, Darren (10 September 2012). "Grassroots Shakespeare rep at Lion & Unicorn". The London Theatre Guide. Archived from the original on 17 February 2015.
- Partridge, Matthew (22 June 2013a). "Unique approach to Shakespeare backfires". remotegoat.com. Blue Compass. Archived from the original on 24 September 2015.
- Partridge, Matthew (4 July 2013b). "Shows the comedy within play". remotegoat.com. Blue Compass. Archived from the original on 24 September 2015.
- Loxton, Howard (25 June 2013b). "Doing Without a Director – That's Grassroots Shakespeare's Choice". British Theatre Guide.
- Denham, Jess (25 March 2014). "EastEnders' James Alexandrou to play Iago in Shakespeare's Othello". The Independent.
- "The Why Factor". BBC World Service. 28 March 2014.
