= Trevor Nunn =

British theatre director (born 1940)

Sir Trevor Nunn CBE
- Born: Trevor Robert Nunn; 14 January 1940 (age 86); Ipswich, Suffolk, England
- Education: Downing College, Cambridge
- Occupations: Theatre director, lyricist
- Years active: 1960s–present
- Spouses: Janet Suzman (m. 1969; div. 1986) Sharon Lee-Hill (m. 1986; div. 1991) Imogen Stubbs (m. 1994; sep. 2011)
- Children: 5, including Laurie and Ellie

Sir Trevor Robert Nunn (born 14 January 1940) is an English theatre director and lyricist. He has been the artistic director for the Royal Shakespeare Company, the Royal National Theatre, and, currently, the Theatre Royal Haymarket. He has directed dramas for the stage, including Macbeth, as well as opera and musicals, such as Cats (1981) and Les Misérables (1985).

Nunn has been nominated for the Tony Award for Best Direction of a Musical, the Tony Award for Best Direction of a Play, the Laurence Olivier Award for Best Director, and the Drama Desk Award for Outstanding Director of a Musical, winning Tonys for Cats, Les Misérables, and Nicholas Nickleby and the Olivier Awards for productions of Summerfolk, The Merchant of Venice, Troilus and Cressida, and Nicholas Nickleby. In 2008, The Telegraph named Nunn among the most influential people in British culture. He has also directed works for film and television.

== Early years ==
Trevor Nunn was born on 14 January 1940 in Ipswich, England, to Dorothy May Piper and Robert Alexander Nunn, a cabinetmaker. As a small boy, Trevor loved reading but his parents had little money for books. However, an aunt had more books, including the complete works of Shakespeare which he read whenever the family visited her. In the end, his aunt gave it to him.

He was educated at Northgate Grammar School, Ipswich, and Downing College, Cambridge. At Northgate, he had an inspiring English teacher, Peter Hewett, who also directed the school plays. Hewett encouraged him to sit the scholarship exam in Cambridge in the hope of studying under F. R. Leavis at Downing. Hewett also persuaded the headmaster to help with the cost of Nunn staying in Cambridge to take the exam. Nunn's father could not afford it and the headmaster had refused at first so Nunn was close to giving up. At Downing, Nunn began his stage career and first met contemporaries Ian McKellen and Derek Jacobi. In 1962, he directed Macbeth for The Marlowe Society and he directed that year's Footlights. He also won a director's scholarship, becoming a trainee director at the Belgrade Theatre in Coventry.

== Career ==
In 1964, Nunn joined the Royal Shakespeare Company (RSC) and in 1968 he was appointed its artistic director, a position he held until 1986 (latterly with Terry Hands from 1978).

Nunn's first wife, Janet Suzman, appeared in many of his productions, such as the 1974 televised version of his Antony and Cleopatra. Nunn directed the RSC production of Macbeth starring Ian McKellen in the title role and Judi Dench as Lady Macbeth in 1976. Nunn staged the action of the drama with not only the paying audience, but also the audience of all of the actors in the production not in the ongoing scene—they sat on wooden crates just beyond the main playing space.

Nunn became a leading figure in theatrical circles, and was responsible for many significant productions, such as the RSC's version of Dickens's The Life and Adventures of Nicholas Nickleby, co-directed with John Caird, and a 1976 musical adaptation of the Shakespeare play The Comedy of Errors.

A director of musicals in the non-subsidised sector, Nunn directed Cats (1981), formerly the longest running musical in Broadway's history, and the first English production of Les Misérables in 1985, also with John Caird, which ran in London until the summer of 2019. Nunn also directed the little-known 1986 Webber–Rice musical Cricket, at Windsor Castle. Besides Cats and Les Misérables, Nunn's other musical credits include Starlight Express and Sunset Boulevard. In September 1997, he became the Royal National Theatre's artistic director, a position he retained until 2003.

Later London credits include My Fair Lady, South Pacific (at the Royal National Theatre), The Woman in White, Othello and Acorn Antiques: The Musical! (2005), The Royal Hunt of the Sun, Rock 'n' Roll and Porgy and Bess in 2006 at the Savoy Theatre (an abridged version with dialogue instead of recitatives, unlike Nunn's first production of the opera).

He directed We Happy Few, a play by his third wife Imogen Stubbs, in 2004. Stubbs often appears in his productions, including the 1996 Twelfth Night film. Nunn directed a modern production of Shakespeare's Hamlet in 2004, which starred Ben Whishaw in the title role, and Imogen Stubbs as Gertrude, and was staged at The Old Vic theatre in London.

In 2007, he directed the RSC productions of King Lear and The Seagull, which played at Stratford before embarking on a world tour (including the Brooklyn Academy of Music) and then playing at the New London Theatre from November 2007. The two plays both starred Ian McKellen, Romola Garai, Frances Barber, Sylvester McCoy, and William Gaunt. Nunn's television production of King Lear was screened on Boxing Day, 2008 with McKellen in the title role.

In 2008, he returned to the Belgrade Theatre in Coventry (the theatre where he started his career) to direct Joanna Murray-Smith's adaptation of Ingmar Bergman's film Scenes from a Marriage, starring Imogen Stubbs and Iain Glen. Nunn's musical adaptation of Gone with the Wind opened at the New London Theatre in April 2008 and, after poor reviews, closed on 14 June 2008 after 79 performances. In December 2008, he directed a revival of A Little Night Music at the Menier Chocolate Factory, which transferred to the West End at the Garrick Theatre in 2009. The production transferred to Broadway, opening in November 2009, with Catherine Zeta-Jones as Desiree Armfeldt and Angela Lansbury as Madame Armfeldt. Other members of the original London cast also transferred with the production. The production closed in January 2011 after 425 performances.

In 2010, Nunn directed a revival of the Andrew Lloyd Webber musical Aspects of Love from July to September 2010 at the Menier Chocolate Factory and the play Birdsong, which opened in September 2010 at the Comedy Theatre, based on the Sebastian Faulks novel of the same title.

Nunn marked his debut as artistic director of the Theatre Royal Haymarket with a revival of Flare Path (as part of the centenary year celebrations for the playwright Terence Rattigan). The production, starring Sienna Miller, James Purefoy and Sheridan Smith, opened in March 2011 and closed in June 2011, and was followed by productions of Rosencrantz and Guildenstern Are Dead, (June–August 2011) and The Tempest, starring Ralph Fiennes (September–October 2011). His final production at the Haymarket, The Lion in Winter (November 2011 – January 2012), starred Joanna Lumley and Robert Lindsay.

Nunn returned to the Haymarket in 2014 to direct the play Fatal Attraction.

For Christmas 2018, Nunn directed a revival of Fiddler on the Roof at the Menier Chocolate Factory, before transferring to the Playhouse Theatre in London's West End for a limited season in spring 2019. The production starred Andy Nyman as Tevye and Judy Kuhn as Golde.

In 2020, he was due to direct a new musical Identical based on The Parent Trap. It was due to have its world premiere at the Nottingham Playhouse before transferring to the Theatre Royal, Bath, over the summer of 2020. However, due to the COVID-19 pandemic in the United Kingdom, the production was delayed until August 2022.

In 2023 he directed Oliver Cotton's play The Score at the Theatre Royal, Bath, with Brian Cox playing Johann Sebastian Bach. The production and cast transferred to the Theatre Royal, Haymarket in 2025.

In 2026 he directed Speculations, a play by Torben Betts, at the Marylebone Theatre in London. The play is about the American journalist Dorothy Kilgallen and her theories on the death of Marilyn Monroe. In the production Janie Dee plays Kilgallen and Natalie Dunne plays Monroe.

=== Film and opera ===
Nunn has directed opera at Glyndebourne. He re-staged his Glyndebourne production of Gershwin's Porgy and Bess for television in 1993, and was highly praised.

He has directed for film, including Lady Jane (1986), Hedda, an adaptation of Hedda Gabler, and a 1996 film version of Shakespeare's Twelfth Night.

== Personal life ==
Nunn has been married three times and has five children. He was married to actress Janet Suzman from 17 October 1969 until their divorce in 1986. They have one son. From 1986 until their 1991 divorce, he was married to Sharon Lee-Hill, with whom he has two children, including Laurie.

In 1994, he married actress Imogen Stubbs with whom he has two children, including Ellie. In April 2011 Stubbs announced their separation.

Nunn was in a brief relationship with Nancy Dell'Olio in 2011.

In 1998, Nunn was named in a list of the biggest private financial donors to the Labour Party. In 2002, he was knighted.

In 2014, Nunn told The Telegraph that Shakespeare was his religion. "Shakespeare has more wisdom and insight about our lives, about how to live and how not to live, how to forgive and how to understand our fellow creatures, than any religious tract. One hundred times more than the Bible. I'm sorry to say that. But over and over again in the plays there is an understanding of the human condition that doesn't exist in religious books."

== Credits ==
=== Broadway ===
Source: Internet Broadway Database

- A Midsummer Night's Dream (as original producer) – 20 January 1971 – 13 March 1971
- Old Times (as original producer) – 16 November 1971 – 26 February 1972
- London Assurance (as original producer) – 5 December 1974 – 12 January 1975
- Sherlock Holmes (as original producer) – 12 November 1974 – 4 January 1976
- Piaf – 5 February 1981 – 28 June 1981
- The Life and Adventures of Nicholas Nickleby – 4 October 1981 – 3 January 1982
- All's Well That Ends Well – 13 April 1983 – 15 May 1983
- Good (as original producer) – 13 October 1982 – 30 January 1983
- André De Shields' Harlem Nocturne (featuring songs with lyrics by Trevor Nunn) – 18 November 1984 – 30 December 1984
- Cyrano de Bergerac (as original producer) – 16 October 1984 – 19 January 1985
- Much Ado About Nothing (as original producer) – 14 October 1984 – 16 January 1985
- The Life and Adventures of Nicholas Nickleby – 24 August 1986 – 12 October 1986
- Chess – 28 April 1988 – 25 June 1988
- Starlight Express – 15 March 1987 – 8 January 1989
- Aspects of Love – 8 April 1990 – 2 March 1991
- Arcadia – 30 March 1995 – 27 August 1995
- Sunset Boulevard – 17 November 1994 – 22 March 1997
- Amy's View (as original producer) – 15 April 1999 – 18 July 1999
- Closer (as original producer) – 25 March 1999 – 22 August 1999
- Not About Nightingales – 25 February 1999 – 13 June 1999
- Rose written by Martin Sherman (as original producer) – 12 April 2000 – 20 May 2000
- Cats – 7 October 1982 – 10 September 2000
- Copenhagen (as original producer) – 11 April 2000 – 21 January 2001
- Noises Off (as original producer) – 1 November 2001 – 1 September 2002
- Vincent in Brixton (as original producer) – 6 March 2003 – 4 May 2003
- Les Misérables – 12 March 1987 – 18 May 2003
- Oklahoma! – 21 March 2002 – 23 February 2003
- The Woman in White – 17 November 2005 – 19 February 2006
- Rock 'n' Roll – 4 November 2007 – 9 March 2008
- Les Misérables (revival) – 9 November 2006 – 6 January 2008
- A Little Night Music – 13 December 2009 – 11 January 2011
- Cats – 31 July 2016 – 30 December 2017

=== West End ===
Source: Shakespeare Birthplace Trust

- Cats – 1981
- Starlight Express – 1984
- Les Misérables – 1985
- Chess – 1986
- The Baker's Wife – 1989
- Aspects of Love – 1989
- Sunset Boulevard – 1993
- Oklahoma! – 1998
- South Pacific – 2001
- My Fair Lady – 2001
- Anything Goes – 2002
- The Woman in White – 2004
- We Happy Few - 2004
- Acorn Antiques: The Musical! – 2005
- Porgy and Bess – 2006
- Royal Hunt of the Sun - 2006
- King Lear – 2007
- The Seagull – 2007
- Gone with the Wind – 2008
- A Little Night Music – 2009
- Inherit the Wind – 2009
- Birdsong – 2010
- Aspects of Love – 2010
- The Lion in Winter – 2011
- Flare Path – 2011
- Rosencrantz and Guildenstern Are Dead - 2011
- The Tempest - 2011
- A Chorus of Disapproval – 2012
- Fatal Attraction – 2014
- Fiddler on the Roof – 2019
- Identical - 2022
- The Score - 2025

=== Film ===
Source: Contemporary British and Irish Film Directors

- Hedda (director and adaptation) (1975)
- Lady Jane (director) (1986)
- Twelfth Night: Or What You Will (director and adaptation) (1996)
- King Lear (director) (2008)
- Red Joan (director) (2018)
- Prisoner C33 (2022)

=== Television ===
- Every Good Boy Deserves Favour (1979)
- BBC2 Playhouse (TV series) – (1 episode, 1979)
- The Three Sisters (1981 TV movie of Chekhov's Three Sisters (play))
- The Life and Adventures of Nicholas Nickleby (1982 TV mini-series)
- Othello (1990 TV movie)
- Porgy and Bess (1993 TV movie of Nunn's Glyndebourne production)
- Oklahoma! (1999 TV movie)
- The Merchant of Venice (2001 TV movie)
- King Lear (2008 TV Movie)
- Series Shakespeare Uncovered, season 1, episode 4 (2012) The Tempest

== Awards and nominations ==
Year	Nominee / work	Award	Result
1975	London Assurance	Drama Desk Award Unique Theatrical Experience	Won
1977	Macbeth	Laurence Olivier Award for Best Director	Nominated
1979	Once in a Lifetime	Laurence Olivier Award for Best Director	Nominated
1980	The Life and Adventures of Nicholas Nickleby	Laurence Olivier Award for Best Director	Won
1981	Cats	Laurence Olivier Award for Best Director	Nominated
1982	The Life and Adventures of Nicholas Nickleby	Tony Award for Best Direction of a Play	Won
1983	All's Well that Ends Well	Drama Desk Award for Outstanding Director of a Play	Won
1983	All's Well that Ends Well	Tony Award for Best Direction of a Play	Nominated
1983	Cats	Tony Award for Best Direction of a Musical	Won
1987	Les Misérables	Tony Award for Best Direction of a Musical	Won
1987	Starlight Express	Tony Award for Best Direction of a Musical	Nominated
1989	Othello	Laurence Olivier Award for Best Director	Nominated
1990	Aspects of Love	Tony Award for Best Direction of a Musical	Nominated
1994	Arcadia	Laurence Olivier Award for Best Director	Nominated
1995	Sunset Boulevard	Drama Desk Award for Outstanding Director of a Musical	Nominated
1995	The Merchant of Venice / Summerfolk	Laurence Olivier Award for Best Director	Won
1995	Sunset Boulevard	Tony Award for Best Direction of a Musical	Nominated
1995		Golden Plate Award of the American Academy of Achievement	Won
1999	Not About Nightingales	Drama Desk Award for Outstanding Director of a Play	Won
1999	Not About Nightingales	Tony Award for Best Direction of a Play	Nominated
1999	Oklahoma!	Laurence Olivier Award for Best Director	Nominated
2000	Summerfolk / The Merchant of Venice / Troilus and Cressida	Laurence Olivier Award for Best Director	Won
2001	The Cherry Orchard	Laurence Olivier Award for Best Director	Nominated
2002		Laurence Olivier Award for Outstanding Achievement	Won
2002	Oklahoma!	Drama Desk Award for Outstanding Director of a Musical	Nominated
2002	Oklahoma!	Tony Award for Best Direction of a Musical	Nominated
2012		Induction into the American Theater Hall of Fame	Won
2020	Fiddler on the Roof	Laurence Olivier Award for Best Director	Nominated

Sources: Internet Broadway Database, Tony Awards Database (broadwayworld.com), Drama Desk History, Olivier Awards: Past Nominees and Winners
