= James Alexandrou =

English actor (b. 1985)

- Born: James Alekos Alexandrou; 12 April 1985 (age 41); London, United Kingdom
- Occupation: Actor
- Known for: EastEnders (1996–2007)
- Height: 1.91 m (6 ft 3 in)
- Spouse: Avital Lvova (m. 2022)
- Partner: Kara Tointon (2006-2007)

James Alekos Alexandrou (born 12 April 1985) is a British actor and filmmaker from London. He is known for playing Martin Fowler in the BBC One soap opera EastEnders from 1996 to 2007. He was also the presenter of Bizarre Crime on BBC Three.

== Early life ==
Alexandrou was born in London to a Greek Cypriot father and an English mother. He has two sisters, one older, one a twin, as well as a younger brother. He was educated at Chingford Foundation School in Waltham Forest, as well as at Anna Scher Theatre School.

== Career ==
Alexandrou's acting career began in 1996, when he auditioned successfully for the role of Martin Fowler in the BBC One soap opera EastEnders. The character was created shortly after the show's inception in 1985, with the role becoming vacant following the departure of actor Jon Peyton Price in 1996. Alexandrou appeared as Grant in the short film Blessed Burden in 1999.

In July 2003 he participated in a "Soap Stars Special" edition of The Weakest Link. Over Christmas of 2005, Alexandrou starred in the crime caper, Who Stole The Snowman? On 14 April 2006, it was announced that Alexandrou would leave EastEnders in Autumn 2007. He and Natalie Cassidy, who played his on-screen wife Sonia Fowler, left on 2 February 2007 (to tie in with the exits of Wendy Richard and Ray Brooks). When asked about his departure Alexandrou said, "I've decided to leave the show to experience other aspects of my industry. Having turned 21, I felt it was a good time to leave. I owe everything to the show and would love to come back one day - that's if EastEnders would have me." On 12 October 2014, it was announced that actor James Bye would be taking over playing the role in the character's return to Albert Square. According to BBC News, Alexandrou was said to have "given his blessing to the recasting of the role." When interviewed, Alexandrou implicitly stated that he had turned down the opportunity to return to the show.

In early 2007, Alexandrou appeared in the play The Homecoming opposite Harold Pinter for BBC Radio 3.

Alexandrou toured the UK and Norway with the British Shakespeare Company from June to September 2007. He played Pistol in Henry V, and Orlando in As You Like It. It was incorrectly reported that he turned down the chance to replace Daniel Radcliffe in the West End revival of Equus in 2007.

In 2008 he appeared in In My Name, a new play by Steven Hevey, at the Old Red Lion Theatre, produced by Yaller Skunk Theatre Company. The play transferred to the Trafalgar Studio 2 from 1 to 19 July 2008. In October 2008, Alexandrou appeared in All Quiet on the Western Front at the Nottingham Playhouse, prior to a UK tour of the production.

In March 2009, he played the part of Romeo in the Globe Theatre's production of Romeo and Juliet. In October 2009, Alexandrou joined up with EastEnders cast members, Natalie Cassidy (Sonia Jackson) and Nina Wadia (Zainab Masood), to star in comedy shorts for BBC Raw Words.

In 2010 Alexandrou filmed his first feature film, Semper Fidel in Cuba. The film was released in 2014. He appeared in the role of The Man in John Goodrum's play The Black Veil a thriller adapted from a Charles Dickens short story.

In 2011 Alexandrou took part in the BBC Learning project, Off By Heart Shakespeare, where he played Mercutio from Romeo and Juliet delivering the speech; "'tis not so deep as a well".

In 2012 Alexandrou toured theatres throughout the United Kingdom, with the Hull Truck Theatre starring as Phil, in the play DNA.

In April 2014, as part of the Shakespeare 450 celebrations, he played the Iago in Grassroots Shakespeare London's production of Othello at Leicester Square Theatre in London's West End and also performed sonnets at the Guildhall with Damian Lewis. Rehearsals were recorded by BBC World Service and James Alexandrou's performance as Iago featured in their programme The Why Factor.

In February 2015, Alexandrou appeared in Silent Witness as Carl Parry. and in 2022 as Ronnie Reynolds in Call the Midwife.

== Personal life ==
Alexandrou was in a relationship with EastEnders co-star Kara Tointon which began in April 2006. The relationship reportedly ended in November 2007.

== Filmography ==
=== Film ===
Year	Title	Role
2001	EastEnders: It's Your Party!	Himself
2002	Brian Conley: An Audience with Brian Conley	Himself
2002	Smash Hits Poll Winners Party 2002	Himself
2003	Comic Relief 2003: The Big Hair Do	Martin Fowler
2003	EastEnders: Slaters in Detention	Martin Fowler
2003	EastEnders: Christmas Party	Himself
2004	95.8 Capital FM's Party in the Park for the Prince's Trust 2004	Himself
2009	Wendy Richard: To Tell You The Truth	Himself
2011	EastEnders: Greatest Exits	Martin Fowler
2013	No Easy Way Out	Adam
2013	Soror	Andrew
2015	Fingers	Mikey Smith
2015	The Prey	Ethan
2018	The Best of EastEnders	Martin Fowler

=== Television ===
Year	Title	Role	Notes
1996-2007, 2011	EastEnders	Martin Fowler	Regular role, 754 episodes
2000	Friends Like These	Himself	Episode: "Holby City Vs Eastenders"
2000-2001	This Is Your Life	Himself	2 episodes
2002	Sport Relief	Himself	Episode: "2002"
2002	Soccer AM	Himself	Episode: "Series 7, episode 9"
2003	RI:SE	Himself	Episode: "Series 2, episode 6"
2003	Beebie's Tails	Himself	Episode: "Beebie and the Missing Things"
2003	SM:TV Live	Himself	Episode: "27 December 2003"
2003, 2006	The Weakest Link	Himself	2 episodes
2003, 2007	Richard & Judy	Himself	2 episodes
2004	The Saturday Show	Himself	Episode: "Series 2, episode 8"
2005-2007	The British Soap Awards	Himself	3 episodes
2005-2006	The Paul O'Grady Show	Himself	2 episodes
2006	The 1st TVNow Awards	Himself	Episode: "2006"
2006	They Think It's All Over	Himself	Episode: "Summer Special"
2007	EastEnders Revealed	Martin Fowler	Episode: "Vixens: The Rise and Fall of Stella"
2007-2008	Loose Women	Himself	2 episodes
2008	Beautiful People	Martin Fowler	Episode: "How I Got My Vase"
2008	Breakfast	Himself	Episode: "4 July 2008"
2010	Missing	Andy Garsdale	Episode: "Series 2, episode 5"
2011	Cannabis: What's the Harm?	Himself	Episode: "Series 1, episode 2"
2013	You, Me & Them	Phil	Episode: "The Test"
2015	Casualty	Franny Davis	Episode: "The Last Goodbye"
2015	Silent Witness	Carl Parry	2 episodes
2020	EastEnders: Secrets from the Square	Martin Fowler	Episode: "Martin and Kush"
2022	The Confessions of Frannie Langton	Constable Meek	2 episodes
2023	Call the Midwife	Ronnie Reynolds	Episode: "Series 12, episode 2"
2025	The Hack	DS Richard Brightly	Episode: "Series 1, episode 4"
2026	Citadel	CIA Lead Officer	Episode: "Series 2, episode 3"
