= Ellie Nunn =

British actress

- Born: 1991 (age 34–35)
- Education: Homerton College, Cambridge
- Occupation: Actress
- Parent(s): Trevor Nunn; Imogen Stubbs
- Relatives: Laurie Nunn (half-sister)

Ellie Nunn (born 1991) is an English actress. She is the daughter of director Sir Trevor Nunn and actress Imogen Stubbs.

She was educated at Homerton College, Cambridge. She appeared as Lily in the 2009 film Cracks, directed by Jordan Scott. She has appeared in stage productions including the off-West End musical Desperate Measures at Jermyn Street Theatre by Robert Kingsland and Chris Barton and Declan Donnellan's production of Shakespeare in Love at the Noël Coward Theatre. In 2016, she was announced as Viola in Grassroots Shakespeare London's production of Twelfth Night in April 2016, as part of the global Shakespeare 400 celebrations.

In 2025, Ellie toured the UK as Truly Scrumptious in the stage musical Chitty Chitty Bang Bang.
