= John Pickard (British actor) =

English actor

- Born: John Pickard; 2 November 1977 (age 48); Surrey, England
- Occupation: Actor
- Years active: 1989–present
- Relatives: Nick Pickard (brother)

John Pickard (born 2 November 1977 in Surrey, England) is an English actor, best known for playing David Porter in the BBC sitcom 2point4 Children, and Dominic Reilly (brother of Tony Hutchinson), played by Pickard's own brother Nick Pickard in Channel 4's Hollyoaks.

== Career ==
He trained at the Sylvia Young Theatre School.

He has performed on stage, in films and on TV.

Between 1990 and 1991, he appeared in Series 13 and 14 of the children's BBC drama series Grange Hill as the character Neil Timpson.

In 1991 he was cast as David Porter, alongside Gary Olsen and Belinda Lang, in the BBC1 sitcom 2point4 Children, which ran for eight series until 1999.

He then joined Hollyoaks in 2005 as Dominic Reilly, and left in 2010.

In 2008, he was cast as Doctor Who companion Thomas Brewster for Doctor Who Audio Dramas in The Haunting of Thomas Brewster. Due to this and other audio dramas, he attended Gallifrey One in February 2010, an annual North American science fiction convention in Los Angeles, California.

== Theatre ==
- 2016 – Sir Toby Belch in Twelfth Night – (Grassroots Shakespeare London, Leicester Square Theatre)
- 2012 – Beauty and the Beast – (Newark Palace Theatre, Newark-on-Trent)
- 2003 – Wishy Washy – Aladdin – The Playhouse, Weston-super-Mare

As well as pantomimes, he has also performed as George in Same Time, Next Year (at Ashcroft Theatre, Croydon), James in Writebites (at Upstairs at The Bell), Trevor in Aphrodite Blugs (at New End Theatre, Hampstead), Ben in Stroke Me (at Finborough Theatre, Earls Court), Colin in Saved (at Octagon Theatre, Bolton), Romeo in Romeo and Juliet (Stafford Gatehouse Theatre) and Morton in An Enemy of the People (at Playhouse Theatre).

== Filmography ==
=== Television ===
Year	Title	Role	Notes
1989	The Bill	Wayne	
1990–1991	Grange Hill	Neil Timpson	
1991–1999	2point4 Children	David Porter	
1993–1996	EastEnders	Kevin	recurring role
1994–1995	Live and Kicking	Himself	3 appearances
1999	Sunburn	Ryan Eastwood	
2000	The Bill	Kevin Maguire	
2004	Mile High	Jack Fields	Series 2
2007	Soapstar Superchef	Himself	
2008–2009, 2013	Hollyoaks Later	Dominic Reilly	recurring role
2005–2010, 2025,2026	Hollyoaks	Dominic Reilly	
2012	Casualty	PC Chris Bidner	
2015	Casualty	Anthony Simms	

=== Films ===
Year	Title	Role	Notes
1998	More than Dreams	Peter	A short Swiss feature film by Mikaël Ivan Roost
1999	Rage	Thomas "T" Brecknock	Won an award at the Amiens International Film Festival in 2001
