= Imogen Stubbs =

British actress (b. 1961)

- Born: 20 February 1961 (age 65); Rothbury, Northumberland, England
- Education: St Paul's Girls' School; Westminster School; Exeter College, Oxford; Royal Academy of Dramatic Art
- Occupation: Actress
- Years active: 1982–present
- Spouse: Trevor Nunn (m. 1994; sep. 2011)
- Partner: Jonathan Guy Lewis
- Children: 2, including Ellie Nunn

Imogen Stubbs (born 20 February 1961) is an English actress and writer.

Her first leading part was in Privileged (1982), followed by A Summer Story (1988).

Her first play, We Happy Few, was produced in 2004. In 2008 she joined Reader's Digest as a contributing editor and writer of fiction.

== Early life ==
Imogen Stubbs was born in Rothbury, Northumberland, lived briefly in Portsmouth, Hampshire, where her father was a naval officer, and then moved with her parents to London, where they lived on a vintage river barge on the Thames. She was educated at Cavendish Primary School, Chiswick, then at two independent schools: St Paul's Girls' School and Westminster School. She took her bachelor's degree at Exeter College, Oxford, gaining a First Class degree.

While at Oxford, she played Irina in a student production of Three Sisters at the Oxford Playhouse. She also appeared in a student review called Dinosaur Can-can at the same theatre. After graduating, she enrolled at RADA, and while there had her first professional work, playing Sally Bowles in Cabaret at the Wolsey Theatre, Ipswich. In 1982 she appeared in her first film, Privileged.

Stubbs graduated from RADA in the same class as Jane Horrocks and Iain Glen, and later became an Associate Member of RADA.

== Career ==
In the 1980s Stubbs achieved success on stage with the Royal Shakespeare Company, including playing Desdemona in Othello, directed by Trevor Nunn. Other stage work includes Saint Joan at the Strand Theatre and Heartbreak House at the Haymarket, and in 1997 she played in a London production of A Streetcar Named Desire.

In 1988, Stubbs played Ursula Brangwen in a BBC serialization of The Rainbow, and in 1993 and 1994 had the title role in Anna Lee. She played Lucy Steele in Sense and Sensibility (1995).

In July 2004, Stubbs's play We Happy Few, directed by Trevor Nunn and starring Juliet Stevenson and Marcia Warren, opened at the Gielgud Theatre, London, after a try-out in Malvern. In September 2008 Reader's Digest announced that she had joined the magazine as a contributing editor and writer of adventure stories.

== Personal life ==
In 1994, Stubbs married Trevor Nunn. The couple have two children: a son and a daughter, Ellie Nunn, who is also an actress. In April 2011, Stubbs announced that she and her husband were separating. Her partner is Jonathan Guy Lewis.

== Filmography ==
=== Film ===
Year	Title	Role	Notes
1982	Privileged	Imogen	
1986	Nanou	Nanou	
1988	A Summer Story	Megan David	
1989	Erik the Viking	Princess Aud	
1991	True Colors	Diana Stiles	
1991	The Wanderer	Narrator	Voice
1994	A Pin for the Butterfly	Mother	
1995	Jack and Sarah	Sarah	
1995	Sense & Sensibility	Lucy Steele	
1996	Twelfth Night	Viola	
2003	Collusion	Mary Dolphin	
2004	Dead Cool	Henny	
2011	Babysitting	Mrs. Wollenberg	Short
2014	Insomniacs	Alice	Short
2016	Stake Out	Sally	Short
2017	Kew Gardens	Isabella	Short, post-production
2018	London Unplugged	Isabella	Anthology film

=== Television ===
Year	Title	Role	Notes
1985	The Browning Version	Mrs. Gilbert	TV film
1988	The Rainbow	Ursula Brangwen	TV miniseries
1988	Deadline	Lady Romy Burton	TV film
1990	Fellow Traveller	Sarah Atchison	In the Screen Two series
1990	Relatively Speaking	Ginny Whittaker	TV film
1990	Pasternak	Lara / Olga (voice)	TV film
1990	Theatre Night	Desdemona	"Othello"
1992	Sandra, c'est la vie	Marie	TV film
1992	Performance	Helen Banner	"After the Dance"
1993	Anna Lee: Headcase	Anna Lee	TV film
1994	Anna Lee	Anna Lee	Main role
1996	1914–1918	(voice)	"Total War"
1997	Screen Two	Suzie	"Mothertime"
2000	Blind Ambition	Annie Thomas	TV film
2000	Big Kids	Sarah Spiller	Main role
2001	Lee Evans: So What Now?	Chloe	"Sofa So Good"
2002	Township Opera	Narrator	TV film
2005	Casualty	Chloe Greer	"Running out of Kisses"
2006	Agatha Christie's Marple	Mona Symmington	"The Moving Finger"
2006	Brief Encounters	Sonia	"Semi-Detached"
2009	New Tricks	Lotte Davenport	"Shadow Show"
2010	The Adventures of Daniel	Mrs. Wallace	TV film
2011	Injustice	Gemma Lawrence	"1.4", "1.5"
2012	Doctors	Miranda Payne	"High-Flyer"
2012	Parents	Isabelle Hopkins	"1.3"
2012	Switch	Esme	"1.6"
2017	Holby City	Evelyn Chapman	"It Has to be Now"
2018	Death in Paradise	Valerie O'Toole	"7.3"
2021	Midsomer Murders	Tamara Deddington	"21.3 – The Sting of Death"
2023	The Crown	Anne Tennant, Baroness Glenconner	Season 6, episode 8: "Ritz"

== Theatre ==
Year	Title	Role	Company
1985	Cabaret	Sally Bowles	Wolsey Theatre, Ipswich
1985	The Boyfriend	Polly Browne	Wolsey Theatre, Ipswich
1986	The Rover	Helena	Swan Theatre, Stratford
1986	Two Noble Kinsmen	Gaoler's daughter	The Other Place, Stratford
1987	Richard II	Queen Isabel	Swan Theatre, Stratford
1989	Othello	Desdemona	The Other Place, Stratford
1992	Heartbreak House	Ellie	Theatre Royal, Haymarket
1994	Saint Joan	Joan	Strand Theatre
1994	Uncle Vanya	Yelena	Chichester Festival
1996	A Streetcar Named Desire	Stella	Theatre Royal, Haymarket
1998	Closer	Anna	Lyric Theatre, London
1998	Betrayal	Emma	National Theatre
2001	The Relapse	Amanda	National Theatre
2002	Three Sisters	Masha	Theatre Royal, Bath (and tour)
2003	Mum's the Word	Linda	Albery Theatre
2004	Hamlet	Gertrude	The Old Vic
2006	Duchess of Malfi	Duchess	West Yorkshire Playhouse, Leeds
2008	Scenes from a Marriage	Marianne	Belgrade Theatre, Coventry
2009	Alphabetical Order	Lucy	Hampstead Theatre
2010	The Glass Menagerie	Amanda	Shared Experience
2011	Private Lives	Amanda	Manchester Royal Exchange
2011	Little Eyolf	Rita	Jermyn Street Theatre, London
2011	Salt, Root and Roe	Menna	Trafalgar Studios, London
2012	Orpheus Descending	Lady	Royal Exchange Theatre, Manchester
2013	Third Finger, Left Hand	Niamh	Trafalgar Studios, London
2013	Strangers on a Train	Elsie	Gielgud Theatre, London
2014	Little Revolution	Sarah / various	Almeida Theatre, London
2014	The Hypochondriac	Beline	Touring,
2015	Communicating Doors	Ruella	Menier Theatre, London
2016	Things I Know to be True	Fran Price	Frantic Assembly
2018	The Be All and End All	Charlotte	York Theatre Royal
2018	Honour	titular	Park Theatre
2022	Clybourne Park	Bev/Kathy	Park Theatre
2023	The Children	Rose	Theatre Royal Bury St Edmunds
2023	Three Acts of Love	Dr Fiona McGill	Live Theatre, Newcastle
2025	Hedda	Julia	Theatre Royal Bath's Ustinov Studio
2026	A thing of beauty	Leni Riefenstahl	Tabard Theatre

== Other projects and contributions ==
- When Love Speaks (2002, EMI Classics) – Shakespeare's "Sonnet 21" ("So it is not with me as with that Muse")
