= Do You Know Your Place? =

British TV game show

- Promotional image
- Genre: Game show
- Presented by: Vernon Kay; Paul Gorton
- Country of origin: United Kingdom
- Original language: English
- No. of series: 1
- No. of episodes: 20

Production
- Running time: 28 minutes
- Production company: Stellify Media

Original release
- Network: BBC Two
- Release: 23 February 2026 – present

Do You Know Your Place? is a British television game show, first shown on BBC Two on 23 February 2026. Presented by Vernon Kay and Paul Gorton, the show sees three celebrity guests answering questions about a location in the United Kingdom.

== Format ==
Three celebrities compete each week, with an episode on each weekday. Each episode is about a different location in the United Kingdom. Kay is in the studio with the guests, who first have to find the place on a map, with a point for the closest guess. The guests then watch videos of Gorton as a tour guide to the location, and must deduce if Gorton's claims about the location are truthful. Other games include working out the meanings of local dialect words. Winners on a day receive a postcard and a local souvenir, and the week's winner wins a sweatshirt.

== Production ==
The series, as well as a Ronan Keating travelogue and two further series of The Finish Line, was announced on 12 November 2025 at the Belfast Media Festival, with 20 episodes of 30 minutes in length, produced by Stellify Media from Northern Ireland. Hosted by Bolton-born Vernon Kay, the show's pilot was the first for Gorton, who had been a contestant on series two of The Traitors and had been booked as a contestant before an unidentified scheduled co-host withdrew.

Episodes across the first series featured Cardiff, Dudley, Bolton, Wrexham, Bristol, Taunton, and Falkirk; on-location filming for the last two of these took place in September and October 2025 respectively. On the episode about Kay's home town of Bolton, the local dialect words were introduced by his childhood friend, his former English teacher, and a woman he had admired at school.

== Transmissions ==
Series	Start date	End date	Episodes	Notes
1	23 February 2026	25 March 2026	20	Series 1 took a break from 19–22 March 2026.

=== Episodes (Series 1) ===
23–27 February

- Contestants: Anneka Rice, Shane Todd, Remi Burgz
- Locations: Whitby, Cardiff, Jedburgh, Bolton, Coleraine

2–6 March

- Contestants: Nitin Ganatra, Kate Bottley, Alex Gray
- Locations: Derry (credited as Derry/Londonderry), Dudley, Falkirk, Bristol, Wrexham

9–13 March

- Contestants: Owain Wyn Evans, Greg Rutherford, Abby Cook
- Locations: Belfast; Taunton; Paisley, Renfrewshire; Kirkby Lonsdale; Bangor, Gwynedd

16–25 March

- Contestants: Susan Calman, Max Fosh, Noreen Khan
- Locations: Dundee, Enniskillen, Abergavenny, Bamburgh, Leicester
