= The Traitors (British TV series) series 3 =

2025 series of The Traitors

The Traitors
- Series 3
- Promotional poster
- Presented by: Claudia Winkleman
- No. of contestants: 25
- Winners: Jake Brown; Leanne Quigley
- Location: Ardross, Highland
- Companion show: The Traitors: Uncloaked
- No. of episodes: 12

Release
- Original network: BBC One
- Original release: 1 January – 24 January 2025

Series chronology
- ← Previous; Series 2 Next → Series 4

The third series of The Traitors was first broadcast on BBC One on 1 January 2025. Claudia Winkleman returned to present the series, accompanied by the returning spin-off show The Traitors: Uncloaked, presented by Ed Gamble. The series concluded on 24 January 2025 when Jake Brown and Leanne Quigley won as Faithfuls.

== Production ==
In November 2023, prior to the beginning of the previous series, it was announced that The Traitors had been renewed for a third series. Applications for the third series opened in January 2024 and closed on 17 March 2024. It was confirmed that the BBC had received over 300,000 applications for the series.

The first teaser trailer for the series aired on 29 November 2024, which featured clips from the previous two series, as well as reviews from news outlets. Ahead of the series, host Claudia Winkleman teased "more knitwear", "quite a lot of tweed" and a twist that would "hopefully have viewers on the edge of their seats".

== Contestants ==
The 25 contestants competing in the series were revealed at midnight on 1 January 2025, the day of the show's launch, and featured three more contestants than the two previous series. Amongst the contestants were two sisters, Armani Gouveia and Maia Gouveia.

List of The Traitors contestants
Contestant	Age	Residence	Occupation	Affiliation	Finish
Jack Marriner-Brown	24	Bridlington, England	Market trader and landscaper	None (Note: Jack was eliminated before roles were assigned.)	Eliminated (Episode 1)
Yin Lü	34	Reading, England	Doctor of Communication	Faithful	Murdered (Episode 1)
Nathan Khider	39	London, England	Property consultant	Faithful	Banished (Episode 2)
Keith Stewart	65	Bournemouth, England	Window cleaner	Faithful	Murdered (Episode 2)
Elen Wyn	24	Cardiff, Wales	Translator	Faithful	Banished (Episode 2)
Armani Gouveia	27	London, England	Financial investigator	Traitor	Banished (Episode 3)
Maia Gouveia	25	Epping, England	Stay at home mum	Faithful	Murdered (Episode 4)
Kasim Ahmed	33	Cambridge, England	Doctor	Faithful	Banished (Episode 4)
Tyler Smith	29	Leicester, England	Barber	Faithful	Banished (Episode 5)
Olivia "Livi" Deane	26	Horsham, England	Beautician and model	Faithful	Murdered (Episode 6)
Dan Bird	33	Liverpool, England	Bank risk manager	Faithful	Banished (Episode 6)
Fozia Fazil	50	Birmingham, England	Community development manager	Faithful	Murdered (Episode 7)
Linda Rands	70	Hitchin, England	Retired opera singer	Traitor	Banished (Episode 7)
Anna Duke	28	Blessington, Ireland	Swimming teacher	Faithful	Murdered (Episode 8)
Alex Oleksy	29	Whitby, England	Care manager	Faithful	Banished (Episode 8)
Lisa Coupland	62	Mawgan-in-Meneage, England	Anglican priest	Faithful	Murdered (Episode 9)
Leon Jackman	40	Ilkeston, England	Retail store manager	Faithful	Banished (Episode 9)
Joe Scott	37	Southampton, England	English teacher	Faithful	Murdered (Episode 10)
Minah Shannon	29	Liverpool, England	Call centre manager	Traitor	Banished (Episode 10)
Freddie Fraser	20	Peterborough, England	Politics student	Traitor (Note: Freddie was recruited as a Traitor in Episode 10.)	Banished (Episode 11)
Charlotte Berman	32	Basingstoke, England	Business director	Traitor (Note: Charlotte was recruited as a Traitor in Episode 8.)	Banished (Episode 12)
Alexander Dragonetti	38	London, England	Former British diplomat	Faithful	Banished (Episode 12)
Francesca Rowan-Plowden	44	Rye, England	Interior designer	Faithful	Banished (Episode 12)
Jake Brown	28	Barrow-in-Furness, England	Project manager, and former CP football player	Faithful	Winner (Episode 12)
Leanne Quigley	28	Holywell, Wales	Former soldier	Faithful	Winner (Episode 12)

== Elimination history ==
Key

The contestant was a Faithful.
The contestant was a Traitor.
The contestant was murdered by the traitors.
The contestant was banished at the round table.
The contestant was immune from the banishment and subsequent murder.
The contestant forfeited their place in the game.

Episode	1	2		3	4	5	6		7	8	9	10		11		12
Traitors' Decision	Yin	Keith		None	Maia	Anna	Livi	Alexander; Anna; Fozia; Leon	Charlotte	Anna	Lisa	Joe	Freddie	~~Leanne~~	None (Note: No murder took place; having become the Seer, Francesca selected Charlotte to meet with her and reveal her identity.)	None
Traitors' Decision	Murder			None	Murder	Seduce	Murder	Shortlist (Note: The Traitors nominated four players as potential murder victims before leaving the castle by writing their names on a painting. These players then played a "death game" to determine who would be murdered. As the loser of the game, Fozia was murdered in episode 7.)	Ultimatum	Murder			Ultimatum	Murder	None	None
Immune	None	All (Note: The players successfully completed the mission, preventing the Traitors from committing a murder.)		Alex; Anna; Armani; Dan; Francesca; Joe; Leanne; Leon; Linda; Lisa; Livi; Tyler	Alexander; Fozia; Leanne; Minah	Leanne; Leon	Charlotte; Dan; Linda		None	Jake	Freddie	Leanne		None		
Banishment	None	Nathan	Elen	Armani	Kasim	Tyler	Dan		Linda	Alex	Leon	Minah		Freddie		Charlotte
Vote	None	8–4–2–2– 1–1–1–1–1	9–4–3– 1–1–1	9–3–2– 1–1–1–1	7–5–4	12–3–2	7–4–2–1–1		7–3–2–1	8–2–1	5–4	4–2–1		5–1		4–1
Jake	No vote	Linda	Elen	Armani	Kasim	Tyler	Linda		Linda	Alex	Francesca	Freddie		Freddie		Charlotte
Leanne	No vote	Charlotte	Charlotte	Armani	Freddie	Tyler	Dan		Linda	Alex	Francesca	Alexander		Freddie		Charlotte
Francesca	No vote	Nathan	Kasim	Maia	Freddie	Tyler	Alex		Leanne	Alex	Leon	Minah		Freddie		Charlotte
Alexander (Note: Alexander, Fozia and Jack forfeited their place in the game in Episode 1. During Episode 4's Alexander and Fozia were selected by the group to enter the game, whilst Jack's elimination was made permanent.)	No vote	Eliminated (Episode 1)			No vote	Lisa	Linda		Leanne	Alex	Leon	Minah		Freddie		Charlotte
Charlotte	No vote	Keith	Kasim	Kasim	Anna	Tyler	Linda		Linda	Leon	Leon	Minah		Freddie		Francesca
Freddie	No vote	Elen	Elen	Armani	Kasim	Tyler	Dan		Linda	Alex	Leon	Minah		Charlotte		Banished (Episode 11)
Minah	No vote	Livi	Charlotte	Armani	Kasim	Tyler	Dan		Linda	Alex	Francesca	Freddie		Banished (Episode 10)		
Joe	No vote	Nathan	Kasim	Kasim	Kasim	Tyler	Linda		Linda	Alex	Leon	Murdered (Episode 10)				
Leon	No vote	Francesca	Elen	Armani	Kasim	Tyler	Dan		Linda	Alex	Francesca	Banished (Episode 9)				
Lisa	No vote	Charlotte	Francesca	Joe	Anna	Tyler	Dan		Alexander	Leon	Murdered (Episode 9)					
Alex	No vote	Nathan	Elen	Armani	Anna	Tyler	Dan		Leanne	Freddie	Banished (Episode 8)					
Anna	No vote	Nathan	Elen	Kasim	Kasim	Lisa	Alex		Minah	Murdered (Episode 8)						
Linda	No vote	Jake	Elen	Jake	Anna	Tyler	Fozia		Alexander	Banished (Episode 7)						
Fozia	No vote	Eliminated (Episode 1)			No vote	Lisa	Dan		Murdered (Episode 7)							
Dan	No vote	Nathan	Freddie	Armani	Anna	Tyler	Leanne		Banished (Episode 6)							
Livi	No vote	Elen	Elen	Armani	Freddie	Freddie	Murdered (Episode 6)									
Tyler	No vote	Linda	Elen	Armani	Kasim	Freddie	Banished (Episode 5)									
Kasim	No vote	Nathan	Charlotte	Freddie	Freddie	Banished (Episode 4)										
Maia	No vote	Anna	Elen	Freddie	Murdered (Episode 4)											
Armani	No vote	Nathan	Charlotte	Charlotte	Banished (Episode 3)											
Elen	No vote	Linda	Linda	Banished (Episode 2)												
Keith	No vote	Nathan	Murdered (Episode 2)													
Nathan	No vote	Linda	Banished (Episode 2)													
Yin	No vote	Murdered (Episode 1)														
Jack	No vote	Eliminated (Episode 1)														

=== End game ===
Episode	12				
Decision	Banish	Alexander	Banish	Francesca	Game Over; Faithfuls Win
Vote	4–0	3–1	3–0	2–1	Game Over; Faithfuls Win
Jake	Banish	Alexander	Banish	Francesca	Winners
Leanne	Banish	Alexander	Banish	Francesca	Winners
Francesca	Banish	Alexander	Banish	Jake	Banished
Alexander	Banish	Leanne	Banished		

== Missions ==
Episode	Task description	Time limit	Money earned	Money available	Running total	Shield winner(s)
1	There were 25 players on a train heading towards the castle. Three players, one from each carriage, needed to volunteer and step off the train within 10 minutes to potentially secure £10,000. By doing so, they eliminated themselves from the game. For each minute that passed, £1,000 was deducted from the winnings.	10 minutes	£7,000	£10,000	£7,000 (of £10,000)	No Shield on offer
2	Unlock crates to reveal a chest of gold worth £1,000 or gunpowder; incorrect answers would cause the contents to explode. The players also had to gather 500 kg of gunpowder in a barrel to destroy a Traitor statue, preventing a murder that night.	30 minutes	£6,000	£10,000	£13,000 (of £20,000)	No Shield on offer
3	Row a Viking longboat to the other side of the loch. As players progressed, they paused at pontoons to gather fuel and gold. To collect these items, two players had to be shackled to the pontoon, putting them at risk of being murdered. At the end of the loch, any players and gold inside the giant ring of fire were safe from murder, and the money was added to the prize fund.	60 minutes	£5,000	£10,000	£18,000 (of £30,000)	Alex
3	Row a Viking longboat to the other side of the loch. As players progressed, they paused at pontoons to gather fuel and gold. To collect these items, two players had to be shackled to the pontoon, putting them at risk of being murdered. At the end of the loch, any players and gold inside the giant ring of fire were safe from murder, and the money was added to the prize fund.	60 minutes	£5,000	£10,000	£18,000 (of £30,000)	Anna
3	Row a Viking longboat to the other side of the loch. As players progressed, they paused at pontoons to gather fuel and gold. To collect these items, two players had to be shackled to the pontoon, putting them at risk of being murdered. At the end of the loch, any players and gold inside the giant ring of fire were safe from murder, and the money was added to the prize fund.	60 minutes	£5,000	£10,000	£18,000 (of £30,000)	Armani
3	Row a Viking longboat to the other side of the loch. As players progressed, they paused at pontoons to gather fuel and gold. To collect these items, two players had to be shackled to the pontoon, putting them at risk of being murdered. At the end of the loch, any players and gold inside the giant ring of fire were safe from murder, and the money was added to the prize fund.	60 minutes	£5,000	£10,000	£18,000 (of £30,000)	Dan
3	Row a Viking longboat to the other side of the loch. As players progressed, they paused at pontoons to gather fuel and gold. To collect these items, two players had to be shackled to the pontoon, putting them at risk of being murdered. At the end of the loch, any players and gold inside the giant ring of fire were safe from murder, and the money was added to the prize fund.	60 minutes	£5,000	£10,000	£18,000 (of £30,000)	Francesca
3	Row a Viking longboat to the other side of the loch. As players progressed, they paused at pontoons to gather fuel and gold. To collect these items, two players had to be shackled to the pontoon, putting them at risk of being murdered. At the end of the loch, any players and gold inside the giant ring of fire were safe from murder, and the money was added to the prize fund.	60 minutes	£5,000	£10,000	£18,000 (of £30,000)	Joe
3	Row a Viking longboat to the other side of the loch. As players progressed, they paused at pontoons to gather fuel and gold. To collect these items, two players had to be shackled to the pontoon, putting them at risk of being murdered. At the end of the loch, any players and gold inside the giant ring of fire were safe from murder, and the money was added to the prize fund.	60 minutes	£5,000	£10,000	£18,000 (of £30,000)	Leanne
3	Row a Viking longboat to the other side of the loch. As players progressed, they paused at pontoons to gather fuel and gold. To collect these items, two players had to be shackled to the pontoon, putting them at risk of being murdered. At the end of the loch, any players and gold inside the giant ring of fire were safe from murder, and the money was added to the prize fund.	60 minutes	£5,000	£10,000	£18,000 (of £30,000)	Leon
3	Row a Viking longboat to the other side of the loch. As players progressed, they paused at pontoons to gather fuel and gold. To collect these items, two players had to be shackled to the pontoon, putting them at risk of being murdered. At the end of the loch, any players and gold inside the giant ring of fire were safe from murder, and the money was added to the prize fund.	60 minutes	£5,000	£10,000	£18,000 (of £30,000)	Linda
3	Row a Viking longboat to the other side of the loch. As players progressed, they paused at pontoons to gather fuel and gold. To collect these items, two players had to be shackled to the pontoon, putting them at risk of being murdered. At the end of the loch, any players and gold inside the giant ring of fire were safe from murder, and the money was added to the prize fund.	60 minutes	£5,000	£10,000	£18,000 (of £30,000)	Lisa
3	Row a Viking longboat to the other side of the loch. As players progressed, they paused at pontoons to gather fuel and gold. To collect these items, two players had to be shackled to the pontoon, putting them at risk of being murdered. At the end of the loch, any players and gold inside the giant ring of fire were safe from murder, and the money was added to the prize fund.	60 minutes	£5,000	£10,000	£18,000 (of £30,000)	Livi
3	Row a Viking longboat to the other side of the loch. As players progressed, they paused at pontoons to gather fuel and gold. To collect these items, two players had to be shackled to the pontoon, putting them at risk of being murdered. At the end of the loch, any players and gold inside the giant ring of fire were safe from murder, and the money was added to the prize fund.	60 minutes	£5,000	£10,000	£18,000 (of £30,000)	Tyler
4	Collect and deposit gold coins. Three players who were eliminated in the first episode were suspended in cages in the woods, with an opportunity to rejoin the game. Sacks containing gold coins worth £50 each were hanging from the trees. The team had to collect the coins and decide which player to release by placing the coins in one of three tubes. However, they only had enough coins to release two out of the three players. Each returning player received a shield that they could give to anyone of their choice if they were freed.	No time limit	£6,500	£7,450	£24,500 (of £37,450)	Leanne
4		No time limit	£6,500	£7,450	£24,500 (of £37,450)	Minah
5	Navigate through a fun house with a balloon. Players formed pairs, except for Dan, who worked solo, to transport a golden balloon through a fun house without popping it. Each balloon was worth £1,000. Only one safe route existed to reach the end. Players had to choose one of four doors to pass through. Selecting the right door allowed them to continue, while an incorrect choice meant the balloon was popped by a horror clown. The first player(s) to navigate the doors successfully received shields.	No time limit	£5,000	£9,000	£29,500 (of £46,450)	Leanne
5		No time limit	£5,000	£9,000	£29,500 (of £46,450)	Leon
6	Ceremony of truth. All players began the mission with a shield. Blindfolded and paired up, they chose someone they thought didn't deserve a shield. A bucket was secretly placed behind the selected player and then poured over them. The marked player had to guess who was responsible. If they guessed correctly, both culprits lost their shields. If they guessed incorrectly, they lost their own shield, and the culprits stayed anonymous. The game finished when three players had shields remaining.	No time limit	£5,000	£5,000	£34,500 (of £51,450)	Charlotte
6	Ceremony of truth. All players began the mission with a shield. Blindfolded and paired up, they chose someone they thought didn't deserve a shield. A bucket was secretly placed behind the selected player and then poured over them. The marked player had to guess who was responsible. If they guessed correctly, both culprits lost their shields. If they guessed incorrectly, they lost their own shield, and the culprits stayed anonymous. The game finished when three players had shields remaining.	No time limit	£5,000	£5,000	£34,500 (of £51,450)	Dan
6	Ceremony of truth. All players began the mission with a shield. Blindfolded and paired up, they chose someone they thought didn't deserve a shield. A bucket was secretly placed behind the selected player and then poured over them. The marked player had to guess who was responsible. If they guessed correctly, both culprits lost their shields. If they guessed incorrectly, they lost their own shield, and the culprits stayed anonymous. The game finished when three players had shields remaining.	No time limit	£5,000	£5,000	£34,500 (of £51,450)	Linda
7	Find the missing players. The team had one hour to find the three surviving players of the previous night's death game by solving riddles to reveal their locations. Every time a missing player was found, the team received a clue to find the next player.	60 minutes	£6,500	£6,500	£41,000 (of £57,950)	No Shield on offer
8	Reverse nursery rhymes. The players were divided into two teams. The team in the woods needed to locate four dolls that sang nursery rhymes backwards, memorise the sound, and then replicate it over the phone to the castle team. The castle team was responsible for remembering the sound, recording it into a gramophone, and then reversing the sound to identify the correct nursery rhyme. There was one shield hidden in the dollhouse.	30 minutes	£7,500	£10,000	£48,500 (of £67,950)	Jake
9	Build statues. The players had to move giant heads and bodies up a hill and build all 5 statues on plinths to win £10,000. Each head had a players name on it and one of the plinths displayed a shield. Whoever's name was on the head of the statue on the shield plinth would be immune from murder.	45 minutes	£10,000	£10,000	£58,500 (of £77,950)	Freddie
10	Move and think like a traitor. The players faced an enormous chess board featuring their names. The team was required to respond to questions and position a chess piece on the name of the player they thought was the correct answer. For every answer that aligned with the responses provided by the Traitors, £2,000 was contributed to the prize fund. Afterward, each player selected a chest, one of which held a shield.	No time limit	£6,000	£10,000	£64,500 (of £87,950)	Leanne
11	Players had to complete 3 challenges (as detailed in the notes below (Note: Challenge 1 - Players were faced with 15 horror clowns holding balloons— 10 carrying £200 in gold and 5 with skulls inside their waistcoats. All the clowns opened their waistcoats for the players to see the symbols. They then had to memorise which clowns held gold or skulls before the clowns were mixed up. Players then chose a clown by popping its balloon. If the clown had gold, £200 was added to the prize fund. If the clown had a skull, any collected winnings were lost, and the player was eliminated from that challenge - £2,000 won.) (Note: Challenge 2 - Players had to choose a chair with a doll sat on it, then take it in turns to pull the cord with the doll saying a cash amount. Players had to decide how many times to pull the doll's cord in order to accumulate money. If the doll announced "too greedy - you’re out", the player lost any money won up to that point - £1,900 won.) (Note: Challenge 3 - Players saw cages with their names on them. Hidden in the woods was £7,000 in gold coins, each worth £50. Players had to find as many coins as possible, place them in their cage, and hoist it up within 5 minutes (without a countdown) to secure the money - £5,200 won.)) to bank gold, adding a potential £12,000 to the prize fund. Whoever banked the most gold individually out of those who survived the next banishment would become the Seer with the power to know one player's true identity.	5 minutes on Challenge 3	£9,100	£12,000	£73,600 (of £99,950)	No Shield on offer
12	For the final mission, players had to volunteer to hang beneath a helicopter with bags of gold, which they had to drop into a burning ring of fire. One player remained at the castle to signal via radio when to drop the gold. The cash amounts inside the bags were unknown until the mission was complete. For each player who volunteered, £2,500 was added to the prize fund.	No time limit	£21,000	£30,000	£94,600 (of £129,950)	No Shield on offer

== Episodes ==
No. overall	No. in series	Title	Original release date	UK viewers (millions)
25	1	"Episode 1"	1 January 2025	9.44
25 contestants took the train to the castle for the ultimate murder mystery. Before they arrived, the train was stopped and they were informed that three people had to leave the train (one from each carriage) in 10 minutes with money lost every minute they didn’t do so. Eventually, Jack, Alexander, and Fozia exited the carriages hoping that, like Amos and Kieran in series 1, they might get a chance to renter the game later. Starting at £10,000 the players ended up with £7000 at the start of the game. The train continued to the castle with the remaining contestants. Unlike previous seasons, contestants Armani and Maia revealed to everyone that they were sisters rather than keeping the information secret. In confessionals, Leanne revealed that she was a soldier but was pretending to be a nail technician to avoid being seen as a threat. Lisa was actually an ordained Anglican priest. Charlotte revealed that she was not Welsh and was actually from London faking an accent. She was caught off guard by fellow contestant Elen being a Welsh translator who was excited to meet someone also from Wales. At the traitors selection, Claudia chose Armani, Minah, and Linda making the first single gender original traitor team in the UK series. Claudia also announced that in the final players would no longer reveal their identities. Jake was immediately suspicious of Linda due to her tuning her head when Claudia addressed the traitors during her speech after the selection. The traitors met up to decide who to murder eventually choosing Yin because her career as a doctor of communication made them perceive her as a potential threat. At breakfast, Kas came under suspicion for toasting Yin's memory, and Armani was suspected for her perceived melodramatic behaviour.
26	2	"Episode 2"	2 January 2025 (Note: This episode was released on BBC iPlayer on 1 January 2025.)	8.74
At the roundtable, suspicion falls between Linda and Nathan. Ultimately, despite Jake's suspicions, Nathan is banished and revealed to be a faithful. The traitors choose to murder Keith, believing he is too trusted and liked by the faithfuls. Kas is still suspected by contestants such as Joe, whilst Tyler's suspicions of Armani continue to grow. In the challenge, the contestants had to unlock crates that either had money or gunpowder inside, however incorrect answers would destroy the crate. If they gathered 500kg of gunpowder then they would be able to prevent that night's murder. The contestants successfully prevented the murder and gained £6000 for the prize pot. Elen and Charlotte come under suspicion for their perceived unhelpfulness during the challenge. Armani was also suspected of attempting to sabotage the challenge to prevent them from collecting gunpowder. Minah grows frustrated with Armani's over-confidence that is heightening the faithfuls suspicions of her. At the roundtable, many different people are accused, but Elen is banished. The traitors meet in the turret, but are unable to murder. Armani chastises Minah and Linda for not doing anything, prompting Minah to not tell her about the faithful's suspicions.
27	3	"Episode 3"	3 January 2025	8.81
At breakfast, the faithful's feel confident knowing that none of them were murdered. The friend group of Tyler, Jake, Joe, Leanne, Leon, and Livi come together under Tyler's suspicions of Armani. In the challenge, the contestants row a viking longboat together to different floating pontoons along the water, which are marked with either fuel or gold. Two players must remain on the pontoon to gain the prize. At the end of the loch, those who use the fuel to light the ring of fire and stand within it are safe from banishment. This causes a lot of tension among the players, as many refuse to exit the boat out of fear for their safety leading to less money. Dan and Jake get into an argument surrounding Dan's self-interested play style, which Dan openly admits to. Tyler, Jake, Joe, Leanne, Leon and Livi begin suspecting Freddie of being a traitor, as well as continuing to accuse Kas. At the roundtable, Joe accuses Kas of being a traitor due to his job, leading to comparisons surrounding prolific serial killers Kas could be like. Jake continues to accuse Linda, but is largely dismissed. Maia is reduced to tears as Tyler accuses Armani, and she realises that her sister was likely a traitor. With Maia's testimony, Armani is banished with Minah voting for her, but Linda voting for Jake. The traitors meet in the turret to decide who to murder next.
28	4	"Episode 4"	8 January 2025	9.20
The traitors murder Maia, believing that she is confirmed faithful due to Armani's banishment. Kas feels isolated by the other contestants, as their suspicions of him have caused them to refuse to talk around him. Tyler, Leanne, and Livi begin to suspect Freddie more than Kas. The challenge reveals that there will be a chance for two of Alexander, Fozia, and Jack to re-enter the game, with each player giving a speech as to why the contestants should choose them. The three eliminated players were in suspended cages, and the players must find coins in the woods and deposit them in the box corresponding to the player of their choosing, with each coin lowering them closer to the ground. Each returning player would also be receiving a shield they could gift to a player, and would not be allowed to vote in the roundtable. Ultimately, Alexander and Fozia were saved meaning Jack was permanently eliminated from the show. Due to Claudia's statement that the returning players could be traitors, suspicions immediately fell on them. At the roundtable, Kas continued to be accused by the group, but was defended by Fozia. Freddie was also brought under suspicion by Tyler, leading to an emotional outburst by him that causes suspicions to waver. Tyler changes his mind and re-accuses Kas, causing confusion among the faithful. Finally, Anna was accused due to her struggle to tie a knot during the challenge, leading to fears she was sabotaging them. Ultimately, Kas was banished and revealed to be a faithful. In the turret, Linda and Minah decide to recruit a third traitor.
29	5	"Episode 5"	9 January 2025	9.17
The traitors attempt to recruit Anna, but she chooses to reject the offer and remain faithful. With no murder, the faithful's wonder if the traitors attempted to kill the shield protected Minah and Leanne. Anna decides to keep her failed recruitment secret, only confiding in Charlotte. Minah and Freddie begin detailing suspicions of Tyler. Freddie disparagingly refers to the group of Tyler, Jake, Joe, Leanne, Leon, and Livi at "The Clique" causing them to become paranoid about each other. Leanne wonders if Tyler attempted to kill her to divert suspicion from himself, whilst Tyler proposes that Leon was recruited. In the mission, the contestants paired up and were given a balloon that represented £1000 to transport through a funhouse without popping it. Selecting an incorrect door would release a funhouse clown who would pop the balloon. The first players to reach the end received shields. At the roundtable, Fozia accuses both Linda and Lisa. Lisa came under suspicion due to her constant referrals to God, causing her to reveal her occupation as an ordained priest. Leanne and Leon each accuse Tyler of manipulating them, and he is banished with everyone in their group apart from Livi voting for him. Livi is distraught, especially after Tyler is revealed as a faithful, blaming Freddie for his banishment. Minah and Linda meet in the turret to decide who to murder next.
30	6	"Episode 6"	10 January 2025	9.21
The traitors choose to murder Livi. Linda pretends to cry upon the reveal to try and draw sympathy, but it only causes further suspicion of her, particularly from Jake. Leanne begins to suspect Alexander of being a traitor. In the mission, all players were given a shield and blindfolded. Each player then chose one person they believed did not deserve a shield, and slime them, if the contestant correctly chose the culprit both lost their shields, but if they were incorrect the culprit remained anonymous and only they lost their shield. Dan chose his close ally Minah in order to keep his shield, but eventually admitted it after pressure, leading to Minah and Francesca to campaign for his banishment. At the rountable, Dan and Linda had the most suspicion. Minah defended Linda, leading to Dan's banishment. Linda and Minah then had to perform a murder in plain sight, by writing a shortlist of names on a painting in the library, who would then compete in a game for safety. Despite being able to choose themselves, the pair did not and instead sent Alexander, Fozia, Leon, and Anna into the death game. The four accused were each given cards, one of which had a shield on it, each round the person holding the card with the shield was able to leave alive. Anna saved herself first, followed by Alexander, leaving Leon and Fozia as the two possible murders.
31	7	"Episode 7"	15 January 2025	9.37
At breakfast, none of Alexander, Fozia, Leon, and Anna arrive, and Claudia reveals that one was murdered and they must find them in coffins around the grounds. The group receive a clue to the first coffin, and successfully find Anna in the graveyard. There, they receive a second clue which leads them to a floating coffin in the loch containing Alexander. Alexander is immediately placed under his suspicion due to his calm reaction to being discovered in contrast to Anna's more panicked demeanour. In the final coffin they find Leon, revealing that Fozia has been murdered. In a flashback, Minah and Linda reveal themselves to Fozia and murder her face-to-face. Anna and Alexander both become suspicious of Minah due to her constantly evading murder despite the lack of suspicion on her. Jake continues to accuse Linda who, knowing she will likely be banished soon, tells Minah to accuse her to save her own game. At the roundtable, despite some suspicion on Leanne and Alexander, Linda is ultimately banished with Minah voting for her. As she is the only traitor remaining, Minah is forced to recruit someone, she chooses Charlotte.
32	8	"Episode 8"	16 January 2025	9.47
Charlotte accepts the recruitment and meets Minah face-to-face, however, Charlotte plans to betray Minah soon due to the suspicions surrounding her. The pair choose to murder Anna. Leanne and Alexander's rivalry grows, as they suspect the other of being a traitor. The players were divided into two teams, one in the woods and one in the castle. The team in the woods had to find the singing dolls and relay the tune to the team in the castle, who had to identify the correct nursery rhyme. At the roundtable, Joe becomes convinced that Alex is a traitor, and attempts to convince the faithful's to banish him. Minah continues to come under suspicion, as Lisa correctly accuses both her and Charlotte, as do Leon and Alexander as the two surviving people on the shortlist. Joe is successful, as Alex is banished. In the turret, Charlotte suggests murdering someone on the woods team and risk hitting a shield.
33	9	"Episode 9"	17 January 2025	9.40
Charlotte and Minah choose to murder Lisa. Freddie grows suspicious of Minah, whilst Charlotte still intends to turn on Minah soon. The players had to carry parts of a statue up a hill and construct it on the plinths, each of which were labelled for a player. The shield statue would gift the player whose plinth safety. Freddie is given a shield, and they successfully win all £10000. At the roundtable, Leon comes under suspicion for choosing Freddie for the shield over his close friends Leanne and Joe. Francesca is also accused of being a traitor. Leon is banished, and the revelation that he is a faithful causes Leanne to become further convinced that Alexander is a traitor and Freddie to become convinced that Minah is one. The remaining contestants meet up for a dinner, where they share their personal stories. Minah and Charlotte meet in the turret to decide who to murder.
34	10	"Episode 10"	22 January 2025	9.46
The traitors choose to murder Joe. Charlotte begins to plant seeds about her suspicions of Minah, whilst Freddie and Francesca continue to accuse her. The contestants must answer questions the way they believe the traitors would, by moving corresponding chess pieces to the player the description is most like. For every answer that matched the traitors, they would win £2000. Francesca and Alexander noticed Minah being too forceful for the correct answers, implying she was a traitor who knew them beforehand. At the roundtable, Freddie openly confronts Minah, who accuses him in retaliation. Leanne also continues to accuse Alexander. Charlotte turns on Minah, accusing her alongside Francesca. Minah is banished. In the turret, Charlotte plans to recruit either Freddie or Alexander and convince them to kill Leanne. This is because Leanne has a shield with only them two not knowing about it, so she can ensure that both of them are banished in the following two roundtables, leading to her making the final. She chooses to recruit Freddie, who feels forced to accept. Then, she convinces him to murder Leanne.
35	11	"Episode 11"	23 January 2025	9.63
Freddie is stunned when Leanne arrives at breakfast alive. Leanne reveals her shield and that everyone apart from Alexander and Freddie knew about it, leading to him realising Charlotte has set him up. Panicking, he claims that he knew about the shield, but refuses to disclose who told him. Whilst most disbelieve him, Leanne remains convinced that Alexander is the traitor. In the mission, the players are informed that they have the chance to win a seer power to confirm one player's role going into the finale. Whoever banks the most money in their pot gains this ability. They successfully win £9100, whilst Francesca becomes the seer after Alexander deposits his money in her pot. Alexander convinces Leanne to not target him, and instead focus on Freddie. He also becomes suspicious of Charlotte due to her interactions with Freddie, but does not reveal them in case they switch the target back to him. At the roundtable, Freddie claims that Minah told him about Leanne's shield, despite the fact that she was banished. Caught in the lie, a distraught Freddie accuses Charlotte of telling him, and votes for her. Ultimately, he is banished unanimously and revealed to be a traitor. However, Freddie's breakdown at the table and subsequent accusations towards Charlotte cause Jake and Leanne to become suspicious of her. Francesca chooses Charlotte, as her closest ally, to have her role revealed. The episode ends on a cliffhanger of the pair sitting down to the reveal together.
36	12	"The Final"	24 January 2025	9.98
Francesca and Charlotte open the envelope to reveal that Charlotte is a traitor. Francesca is horrified, whilst Charlotte mocks her. At breakfast, Francesca tries to subtly tell everyone that Charlotte is a traitor. Charlotte claims that Francesca saw her as a faithful and is lying. Francesca hopes that her connection with Leanne can save her, whilst Leanne and Jake agree that keeping both in the game would be a mistake. Meanwhile, Alexander believes Francesca. In the mission, the contestants have to hang from a helicopter and, following directions from the players on the ground, drop bags of money into a burning ring of fire. They successfully banked £21000. At the roundtable, the group choose to banish Charlotte first. They then move outside to the firepit where all four choose to banish again. Whilst Alexander votes for Leanne, Francesca betrays him in the hopes that Leanne will choose her over Jake and Alexander is banished. All three then choose to banish again, with Leanne and Jake banishing Francesca. As only two people remain, the game automatically ends. Jake and Leanne both reveal themselves as faithful's, and celebrate with Claudia.

== Ratings ==
Weekly ratings for each show on BBC One. All ratings are provided by BARB. The final episode of Uncloaked on BBC Two achieved a rating of 5.71 million viewers.

Episode	Date	Official rating (millions)	Weekly rank for BBC One	Weekly rank for all UK TV
Episode 1	1 January	9.44	2	2
Episode 2	2 January	8.74	4	4
Episode 3	3 January	8.81	3	3
Episode 4	8 January	9.20	2	2
Episode 5	9 January	9.17	3	3
Episode 6	10 January	9.21	1	1
Episode 7	15 January	9.37	3	3
Episode 8	16 January	9.47	1	1
Episode 9	17 January	9.40	2	2
Episode 10	22 January	9.46	3	3
Episode 11	23 January	9.63	2	2
Episode 12	24 January	9.98	1	1
Series average	2025	9.32	—N/a	—N/a
