= B9176 road =

Road in Scotland

Coordinates: 57.7647077°N 4.2655518°W

B9176
- Struie Road
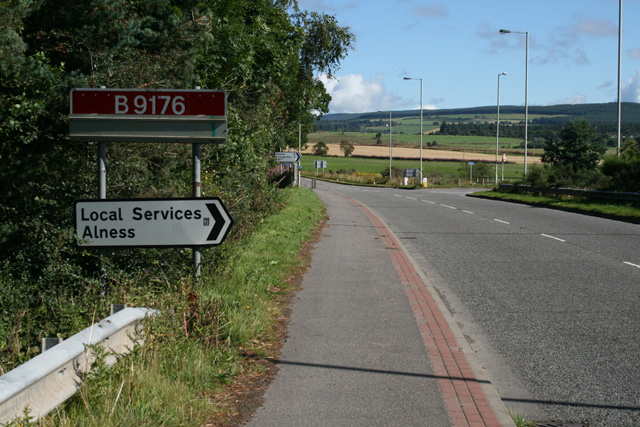

Route information
- Length: 15 mi (24 km)
- History: The B9176 used to be the A836 road (Scotland) before the Dornoch Firth Bridge was built

Major junctions
- South end: Skiach
- A9 A836
- North end: 4 miles south of Bonar Bridge

Location
- Country: United Kingdom
- Counties: Ross and Cromarty, Sutherland
- Primary destinations: Ardross, Alness, Bonar Bridge, Skiach, Strathy, Evanton

Road network
- Roads in the United Kingdom; Motorways; A and B road zones

The B9176 also known as the "Struie" is a 15-mile-long (24 km) road from Alness to Bonar Bridge. in the Scottish Highlands.
