= Strathy, Ardross =

Coordinates: 57.75°N 4.28°W

Strathy: Scottish Gaelic: An t-Srathaidh
- Location within the Highland council area
- Population: 30 (est.)
- OS grid reference: NH6174
- Council area: Highland
- Lieutenancy area: Ross and Cromarty
- Country: Scotland
- Sovereign state: United Kingdom
- Post town: Alness
- Postcode district: IV17
- Dialling code: 01349
- Police: Scotland
- Fire: Scottish
- Ambulance: Scottish
- UK Parliament: Caithness, Sutherland and Easter Ross
- Scottish Parliament: Ross, Skye and Inverness West

Strathy (Scottish Gaelic: An t-Srathaidh, "small strath") is a strath in the Highlands of Scotland, forming the Northern part of the area known as Ardross. The strath runs SSW to NNE for 1.5 miles. The floor of the strath is mainly low-quality fields used for grazing of sheep and cattle. The strath is surrounded by commercial pine forest. Traditionally the strath was populated by tenant crofters, however in recent years there has been an increase in the number of new homes and restorations, after many decades of gradual decline. Strathy runs to the east of the main strath of Strathrusdale.

== History ==
The earliest known habitats of Strathy were the Picts, who lived in the area until the 10th century, when it formed part of the Kingdom of Fortriu. After this period there was an increase in Norse settlement in the area.

== See also ==
- Strathy, a community in Sutherland
