= Linda Rands =

English opera singer and television personality (born 1953)

- Born: Linda C. Rands; 6 December 1953 (age 72); Westminster, London, England
- Occupations: Opera singer; television personality
- Years active: 2025–present
- Television: Rigoletto; The Traitors; The Traitors: Uncloaked; The One Show; Morning Live; Loose Women; The Celebrity Traitors: Uncloaked; The Claudia Winkleman Show

Linda C. Rands (born 6 December 1953) is an English television personality and retired opera singer. She came to prominence after appearing as a contestant on the third series of The Traitors in 2025, and has since appeared on a number of talk shows and associated programmes.

== Life and career ==
Linda C. Rands was born on 6 December 1953 in Westminster, London. She trained at the Royal Academy of Music and the London Opera Centre, before spending seven years performing with the English National Opera during which time she appeared in a production of Rigoletto (1982). Following this, she relocated to Amsterdam, Netherlands where she joined the Dutch National Opera of which she was a part of for thirteen years, before joining the Netherlands Radio Chorus. In 2020, Rands returned to the United Kingdom and currently resides in Hitchin, Hertfordshire.

In January 2025, Rands appeared as a contestant on the third series of the BBC reality show The Traitors. During the first episode, Rands was selected to become one of three traitors alongside Armani Gouveia and Minah Shannon. Despite attracting early suspicion from her fellow contestants (particularly Jake Brown) and receiving numerous votes at several round tables, she progressed to the seventh episode of the show, before she was banished from the castle. Rands gained popularity on social media for her comical "acting skills" throughout the series and was branded an "icon" by viewers. She was described by Grazia as the "standout star" of the series and subsequently appeared on a billboard in Leicester Square praising her for the "performance of a lifetime". Following her departure from the show, she made appearances on the spin-off The Traitors: Uncloaked, as well as The One Show and Morning Live.

== Filmography ==
Year	Title	Role	Notes	Ref(s)
2025	The Traitors	Traitor	7 episodes; Series 3	
2025	The One Show	Guest	1 episode	
2025	Morning Live	Guest	1 episode	
2025	Loose Women	Guest	1 episode	
2025	The Celebrity Traitors: Uncloaked	Guest	1 episode	
2025-2026	The Traitors: Uncloaked	Guest	2 episodes	
2026	The Claudia Winkleman Show	Guest	1 episode	
