= Ardross distillery =

Scotch whisky and gin distillery

Coordinates: 57°44′23.14″N 4°20′17.31″W

Region: Highland
- Location: Alness, Scotland
- Owner: Greenwood Distillers
- Founded: 2019
- Water source: Loch Dubh
- No. of stills: 1 wash still 1 spirit still
- Capacity: 1,000,000 L

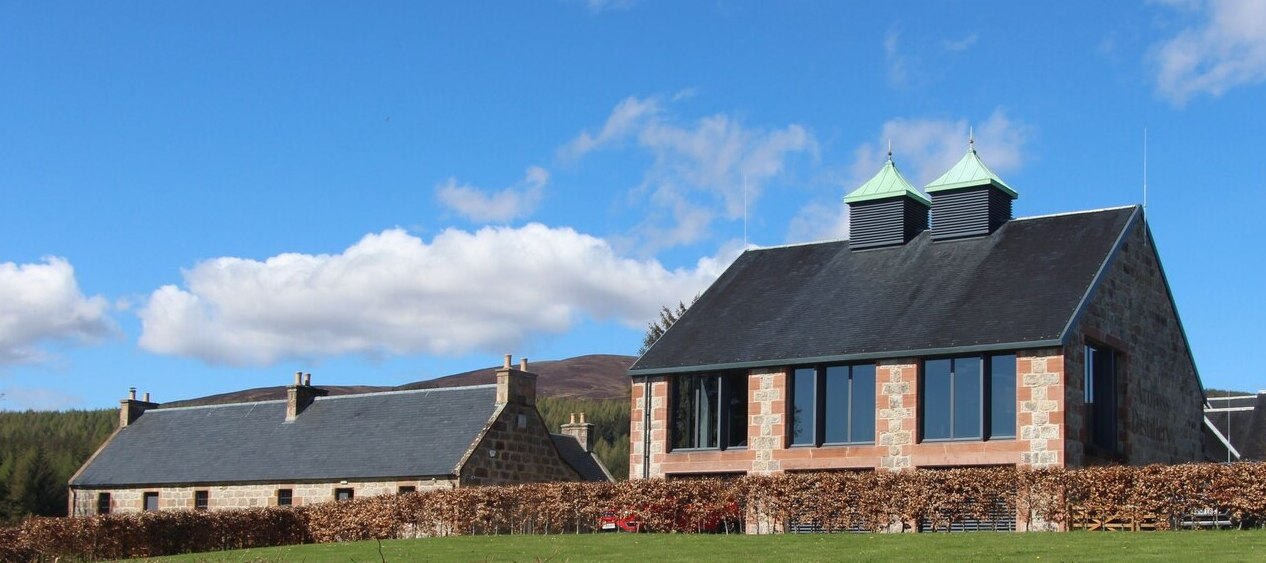

Ardross distillery is a Scotch whisky and Gin distillery in Ardross, Highland, Scotland.

== History ==
The distillery was begun by Andrew Rankin, a Master whisky blender at Ardross mains farm in December 2015. The entire distillery project, including a bonded warehouse outside Glasgow cost approximately £50 million. Planning approval was granted for the distillery in February 2017. Building work began in November 2017 across a 50-acre site. The building work included restoration of the existing 19th century buildings as well as building new distillation facilities. The architect, NoRR commissioned a photographic survey of the derelict buildings prior to their restoration and conversion as a distillery.

In December 2021, new make spirit from the distillery became the first-ever new make spirit to be auctioned in cask at Christie's auction house.

== Production ==
Water for the whisky comes from nearby Loch Dubh.

Whisky production commenced in late 2019. The distillery also began producing a gin 'Theodore' with a Picts theme in Autumn 2019.
