= Episode 12 (The Traitors series 2) =

- The Traitors episode
- Episode no.: Series 2 Episode 12
- Directed by: Katrina Inkster; Norah Quartey; Joshua Wang
- Written by: Lee Gant
- Original release date: 26 January 2024
- Running time: 70 minutes

Episode chronology
- The Traitors (British TV series) series 2

"Episode 12" is the series finale of the second season of the British reality television series The Traitors. It features the final five contestants culminates in the reveal of the last remaining traitor, Harry Clark, who wins the full prize of £95,150.

The episode reached a peak audience of 6.9 million viewers.

== Summary ==
Five players remain in the game: Evie, Jaz and Mollie are Faithfuls, and Harry and Andrew are Traitors. Evie remains the main suspect as the previously banished faithful, Jasmine, was suspicious of her. Jaz, however, remained convinced Harry was an original traitor. Andrew is also placed under suspicion for the banished traitor Ross' accusations, with Harry attempting to increase the suspicion on him.

In the final mission, they are challenged to trek through rough terrain, collect six hidden flags, and sail across a lake to raise the mainsail of a ship within 60 minutes. They successfully complete the mission and add £20,000 to the prize fund, which reaches a total of £95,150.

In the time before the Round Table, Mollie confirmed her alliance with Harry and her belief he was a faithful whilst Andrew was a traitor. Jaz worried her loyalty to Harry would cause his banishment and attempted to convince her of Harry's guilt, however she remained unsure.

At the final Round Table, Evie defends herself and accuses Andrew. Jaz finally revealed his suspicions about Harry and asked about Harry's correspondence with the traitor Paul, which Harry tries to deny by claiming Paul was lying and accusing random people. Evie was ultimately banished with four votes and revealed as a faithful.

Harry regretted having underestimated Jaz and keeping him alive. Andrew realises this may cause Harry to go on the offensive and so started accusing Harry to Jaz, but this sudden shift of opinion caused Jaz to deduce he and Harry were the remaining traitors. Mollie affirms her trust in Harry, although she remains worried about what Jaz told her, believing he is also faithful.

At the end game, all four remaining players elect to banish again rather than conclude the game. Harry, Mollie and Jaz all choose to banish Andrew, who accuses and votes for Harry. Andrew reveals he is a Traitor and leaves the game. Harry and Mollie then vote to end the game, but Jaz votes to banish again. As they write their votes of who to banish, Mollie writes one name on her slate before changing her mind and rewriting it. Jaz and Harry vote for each other, and Mollie's casting vote banishes Jaz. He leaves without revealing he is a faithful. With two players remaining, the game automatically ends. Mollie confirms she is a Faithful and Harry reveals he is a Traitor, meaning he wins all the prize money. An upset Mollie immediately left the room, leaving Harry who proceeds to celebrate with Claudia.

== Production ==
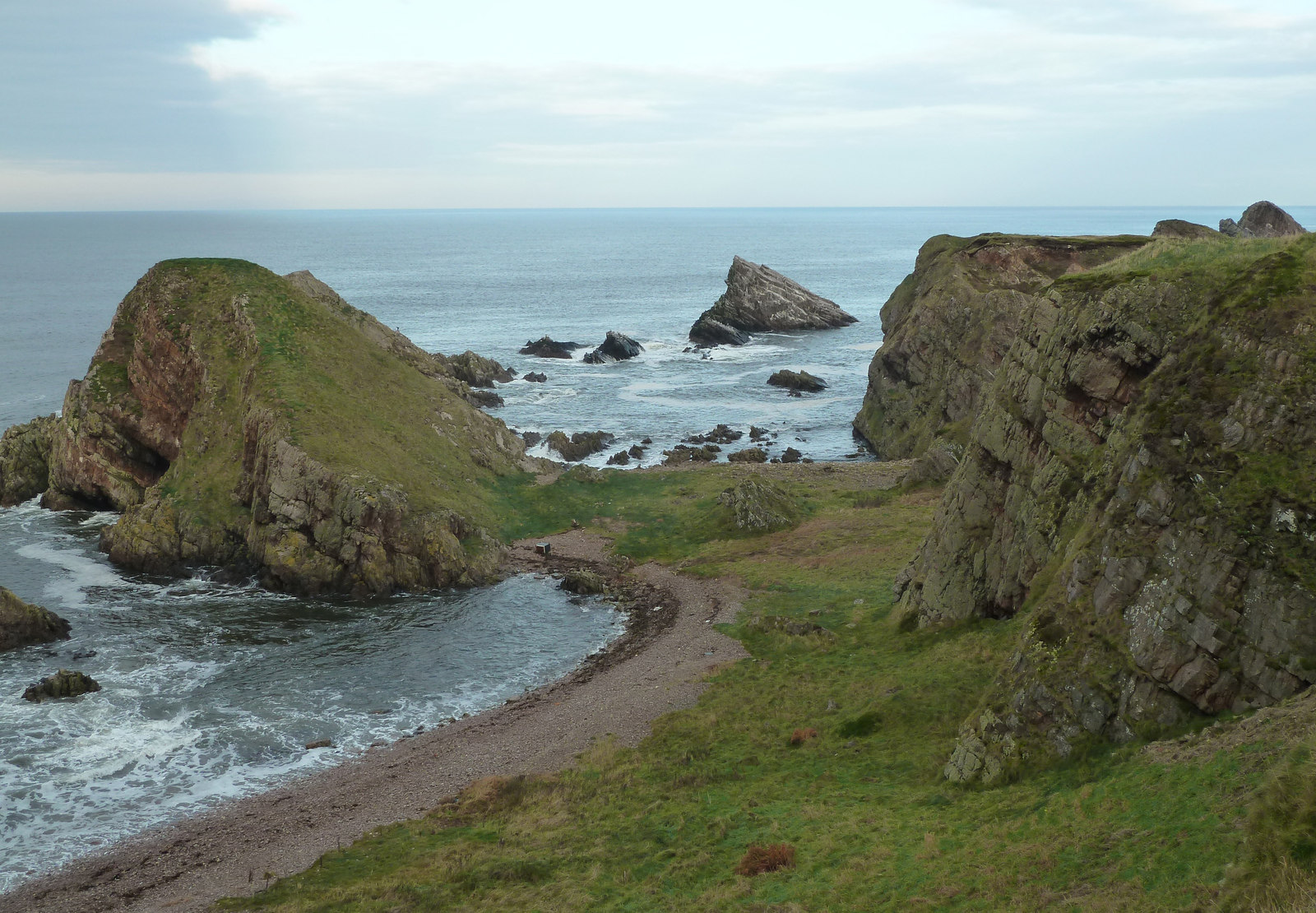
Coastline at Portknockie, the location for the final episode’s outdoor challenge.

The challenge began with a helicopter trip to Portknockie, where the contestants had to raise a ship’s mainsail. Extra flags, worth more money, were scattered around the loch. After abseiling, climbing, and swimming to the ship, the group managed to hoist the mainsail and collect the flags, adding £20,000 to the prize fund — taking the total to £95,150.

The final ceremony was held indoors due to weather conditions, with contestants gathered around an open fire inside rather than outdoors, which was the setting in the previous season. Whilst on BBC Breakfast, Mollie stated that whilst filming the ending she "just called [Harry] a name" and they hugged. She added that she also said "fair play" to him. On the spin-off show Traitors Uncloaked, Harry described admitting the truth to his friend as the "hardest thing ever."

== Broadcast ==
The episode was aired on BBC One and BBC iPlayer from 21:00 to 22:10 and was 10 minutes longer than other episodes in the series. The final was also shown in a number of independent cinemas, including the Mockingbird Cinema, Birmingham, Catford Mews, Lewisham, the Ealing Project and Reading Biscuit Factory.

The BBC confirmed that the episode reached a peak audience of 6.9 million viewers, more than double the season 1 finale's 3.1 million. The episode averaged 5.5 million viewers over its run time, with a 33.5% audience share during its broadcast. This was the show's highest recorded audience.

== Reception ==
=== "Jazatha Christie" ===
In a review of the previous episode Ed Power of The Telegraph stated that Jaz Singh was the only candidate who was not "so easily gulled" by Clark citing a confessional in which he said that he did not trust him. As a result of Singh's suspicions he was given the nickname of "Jazatha Christie" on social media, in reference to English writer Agatha Christie. In the final episode of The Traitors: Uncloaked, the aftershow to the series, Singh discussed his reaction to the "Jazatha Christie" memes saying "to be honest, you just don't expect it". Singh did not have Twitter or know who Agatha Christie was until he googled her and so was confused by the nickname. He added in an interview with Virgin Radio that "although I didn't win the cash prize...to feel as though I've won the nation's heart, that means too much to me. I can't even put it into words".

=== Harry and Mollie ===
Ellie Harrison of The Independent reported that Clark and Pearce established a "close friendship very quickly [which] allowed Harry to get away with murder". Pearce responded in an interview stating that "people have this fantasy that I fancy Harry, but that is so not true" and that it had been "rubbish" for their partners. She added that she thought it was "crazy, that.. a boy and a girl can’t be friends without there being romance speculation." Pearce told Cosmopolitan UK that they bonded "massively" because they were the youngest contestants in the series and because they were both in long term relationships. Clark said that "everyone else had wives and kids" but that they were "sort of, on the same path and had the same feelings of missing our loved person". Pearce's boyfriend is Max Blackwell whereas Clark's girlfriend is children's television presenter Anna Maynard. Pearce posted a video on Instagram with Maynard in which she jokingly referred to her as her "new bestie".

=== Critical reviews ===
Laura Harman of Woman & Home said before the episode aired that the prize was still up for grabs, with the Traitors holding a strong position—two Traitors against three Faithfuls. She noted that Jaz appeared suspicious of Harry and might figure out he was a Traitor before the final, but Evie and Mollie seemed convinced Harry was Faithful. Mollie still had doubts about Andrew and might bring this up at the final roundtable. Harman also pointed out that Evie was under suspicion because she was the only contestant unaware of Harry’s shield. Although this was not concrete evidence, it could make her seem like a Traitor to the Faithfuls. With so few players remaining, she said anything could happen and the jackpot was still in play.

Nick Hilton of The Independent gave the episode five stars saying that now that the format of the show was more accepted and critiqued, the show had "mastered a form of perfect imperfection". Hilton pointed out that the game itself made "little to no sense" as the Faithfuls had to deal with a pair of traitors in the final despite managing to successfully detect four Traitors at the roundtables. He added that it makes the "first several rounds of the game essentially pointless" as the strategy of the game is to "lie low, act dumb and hope that lack of suspicion, or intimidation, carries you all the way". Emily Watkins of The i Paper stated that Mollie's journey "offered viewers a crash course in what is tough – and therefore worthwhile – about love." Watkins added that labelling her naive was unfair.

Carol Midgley of The Times gave the finale five stars, calling it a “seat gripper” and “an absolute nerve-shredder.” Though not a major fan at first, she admitted her “fingernails were bitten to stumps” by the tense conclusion. She praised Harry as "the ruthless killer with the cherubic dimples," who "ran rings round the lot of them" by pretending to be "Mr Nice but Dim." Midgley described Harry’s betrayal of Mollie as “brutal” but admitted he “had earned it,” even if it “felt wrong… but also felt so right." She suggested he "should have run after her... and offered her some money" after she left empty-handed. Despite doubts the second series could match the first, she called it a "stonking success" for the BBC, proving that "appointment TV" is "far from dead." In the end, she concluded, "cheats do prosper. And sometimes they deserve to."
