= Paul Gorton =

English television presenter (born 1980s)

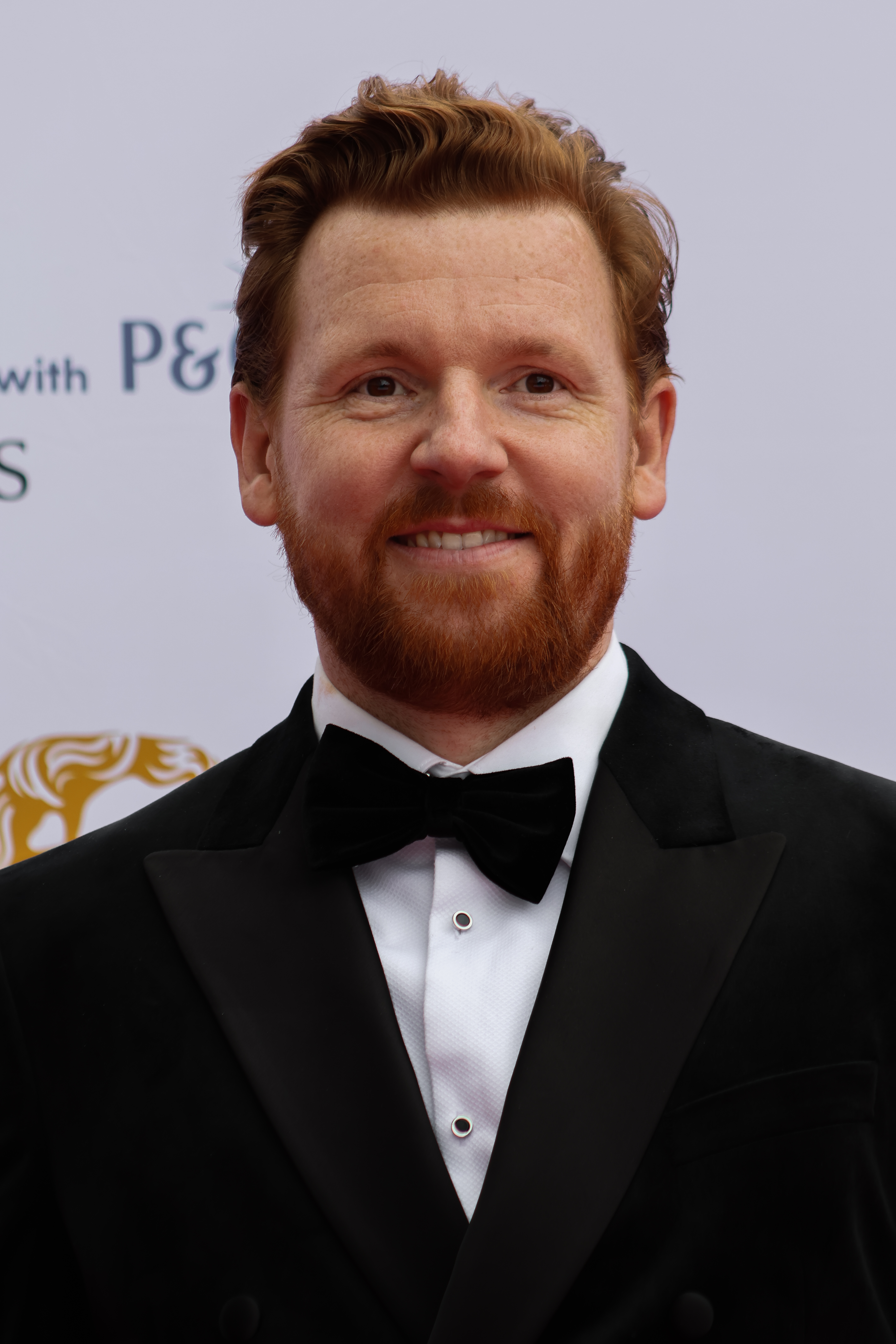
- Gorton at the 2026 British Academy Television Awards
- Born: 1987 or 1988 (age 38–39)
- Notable work: Quest for the Backflip; The Traitors; Do You Know Your Place?
- Spouse: Kate Waldron

Paul Gorton (born 1987 or 1988) is an English television presenter. He has appeared on the second series of the The Traitors and co-presented Do You Know Your Place?

Gorton was originally from Sutton, St Helens but was living with his mother in Warrington in 2010, when he won 10p as an unemployed 22-year-old contestant on Deal or No Deal. He then presented the four-part Extreme Sports Channel series Quest for the Backflip in 2012, a show about BMX, a sport he had resumed after seven years working as a development manager for Three UK. He recounted his Deal or No Deal experience on Joe Wilkinson and David Earl's Chatabix podcast several times from August 2022, which gave him the idea to apply for The Traitors. He subsequently appeared on that series' second season in 2024, having narrowly avoided dropping out after suffering a collapsed lung from a football injury several weeks earlier; he was selected as a traitor and was banished in episode 8. He also appeared on Celebrity Mastermind and Celebrity Antiques Road Trip that year.

By January 2025, he had moved to Hale, Greater Manchester, having moved with his wife to be closer to family, and having lived in London for seven years. His wife is content creator Kate Waldron, who is known online as Forgoodnesskate. In September and October that year, Gorton filmed inserts in multiple UK locations including Cardiff, Dudley, Bolton, Wrexham, Bristol, Taunton, and Falkirk; these were broadcast from February 2026 as part of the BBC Two quiz show Do You Know Your Place? He had previously been booked as a contestant for the pilot programme – his first – but had been promoted to host after an unidentified scheduled co-host withdrew.
