= The Claudia Winkleman Show =

British talk show

- Genre: Talk show
- Presented by: Claudia Winkleman
- Country of origin: United Kingdom
- Original language: English
- No. of series: 1
- No. of episodes: 7

Production
- Executive producers: Graham Stuart; Ruth Phillips
- Production location: Television Centre
- Running time: 50 minutes
- Production companies: So Television; Little Owl

Original release
- Network: BBC One
- Release: 13 March – 24 April 2026

The Claudia Winkleman Show was a British talk show presented by Claudia Winkleman. It was broadcast on BBC One and BBC iPlayer on Friday nights in the spring of 2026.

== Production ==
=== Background ===
In February 2025, Winkleman attracted praise for her one-episode stint as guest host of The Graham Norton Show while Norton was on tour in Australia. Some viewers suggested that Winkleman could present her own show in the future.

On 29 December 2025, the BBC issued a press release announcing a new self-titled talk show hosted by Claudia Winkleman had been commissioned for seven 50 minute-long episodes, in which Winkleman would interview guests on a sofa for "lively conversation" in front of a studio audience. The series would be produced by So Television, the company behind The Graham Norton Show, and Little Owl, with Graham Stuart and Ruth Phillips set to serve as the executive producers. The series would be distributed internationally by ITV Studios.

On 25 February 2026, the timeslot and airdate for the first episode was officially announced as 22:40 on Friday, 13 March 2026, with Hollywood actors Jeff Goldblum and Vanessa Williams, plus British comedians Jennifer Saunders and Tom Allen, all confirmed as the first line-up of guests.

Episodes were filmed at BBC Television Centre in White City, London.

On 16 July 2026, Winkleman announced that she had declined to return for a second series, disclosing that she found the chat show format uncomfortable.

== Episodes ==
=== Series 1 (2026) ===
No.	#	Guest(s)	Original air date	Viewers (millions) (Note: Sourced by BARB.)
1	1	Jeff Goldblum, Jennifer Saunders, Vanessa Williams and Tom Allen	13 March 2026	N/A
2	2	Niall Horan, Rachel Zegler, Guz Khan and Joanne McNally	20 March 2026	N/A
3	3	Lisa Kudrow, Jamie Dornan, Chase Infiniti, Jimmy Carr and Linda Rands	27 March 2026	N/A
4	4	James McAvoy, Rita Wilson, Gugu Mbatha-Raw and Russell Howard	3 April 2026	N/A
5	5	Ralph Fiennes, Anna Faris, Olivia Cooke and Michelle de Swarte	10 April 2026	N/A
6	6	Dan Levy, Cush Jumbo, Phil Dunster, Josh Widdicombe and Mr Blobby	17 April 2026	N/A
7	7	Compilation Show	24 April 2026	N/A

== Reception ==
After the first show had aired, BBC News noted a mixed reception, with The Sun giving the show five stars, and Lucy Mangan of The Guardian giving it two stars and calling it a "mess". The audience participation was praised in a three-star review in Metro and criticised by Mangan. Norton defended Winkleman against accusations that her show was too similar to his.
