= The Traitors (British TV series) series 2 =

2024 series of The Traitors

The Traitors
- Series 2
- Promotional poster
- Presented by: Claudia Winkleman
- No. of contestants: 22
- Winner: Harry Clark
- Runner-up: Mollie Pearce
- Location: Ardross, Highland
- Companion show: The Traitors: Uncloaked
- No. of episodes: 12

Release
- Original network: BBC One
- Original release: 3 January – 26 January 2024

Series chronology
- ← Previous; Series 1 Next → Series 3

The second series of The Traitors was first broadcast on BBC One on 3 January 2024. Claudia Winkleman reprised her role as the show's presenter from the previous series. The series was also accompanied by a spin-off show The Traitors: Uncloaked, presented by Ed Gamble. The series concluded on 26 January 2024 where Harry Clark won as a Traitor, while Mollie Pearce placed as a runner-up, as a Faithful.

== Production ==
In February 2023, it was announced that The Traitors had been renewed for a second series following the success of the first. Claudia Winkleman was confirmed as the host.

The series also saw the debut of a spin-off show The Traitors: Uncloaked, which included interviews with banished and murdered contestants, as well as bonus unseen footage where the contestants learned the identity of the Traitors for the very first time.

The first teaser trailer for the series aired in October 2023; further trailers promoting the series were released by the BBC in the lead up to the series premiere.

Ahead of the release of series 2, the BBC announced the show had been renewed for a third series.

== Contestants ==
The 22 contestants competing in the second series of The Traitors were revealed at midnight on 2 January 2024, the day before the show's premiere. Amongst the contestants was a secret mother and son pair, Diane and Ross Carson, whose relationship was revealed to viewers in the third episode.

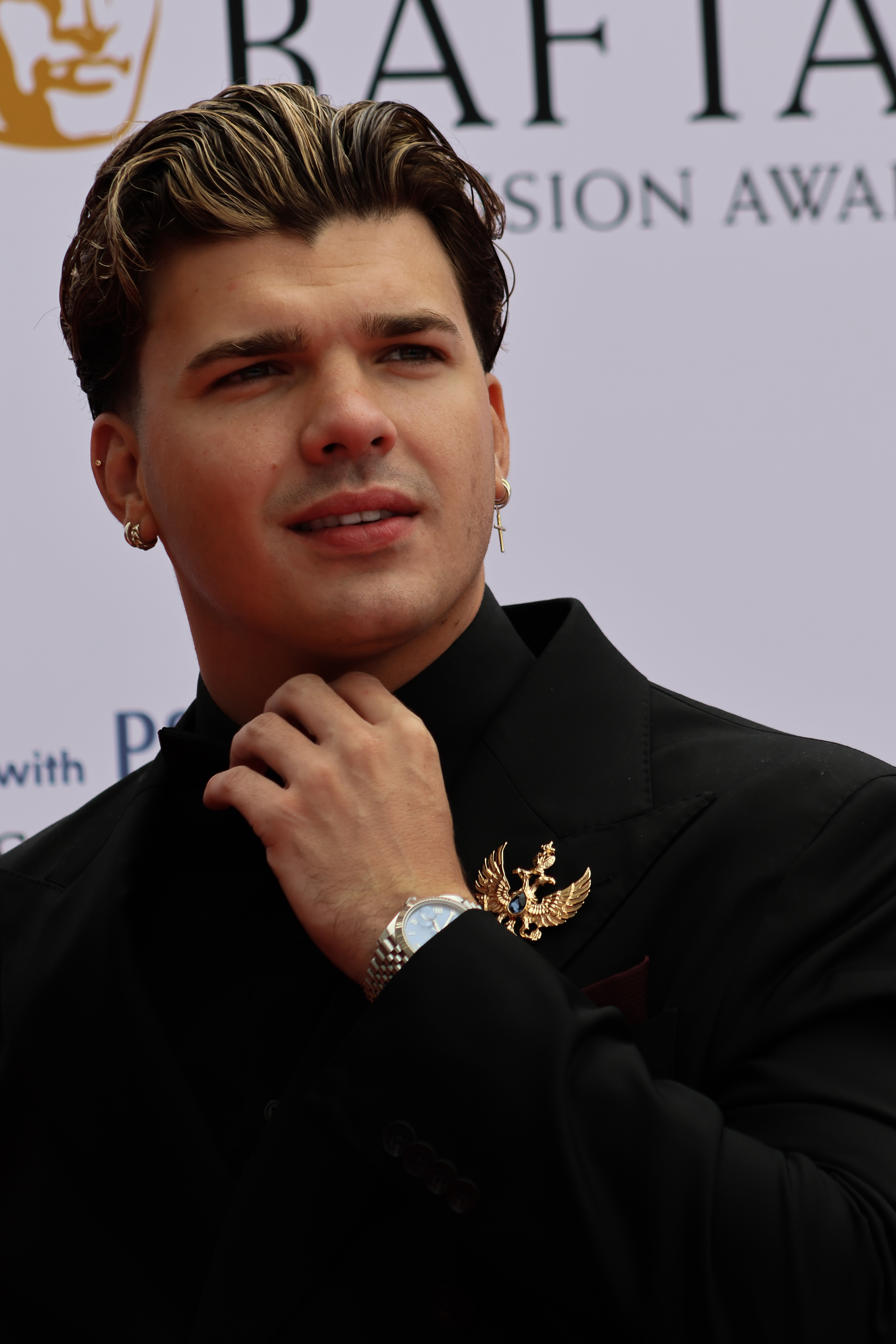
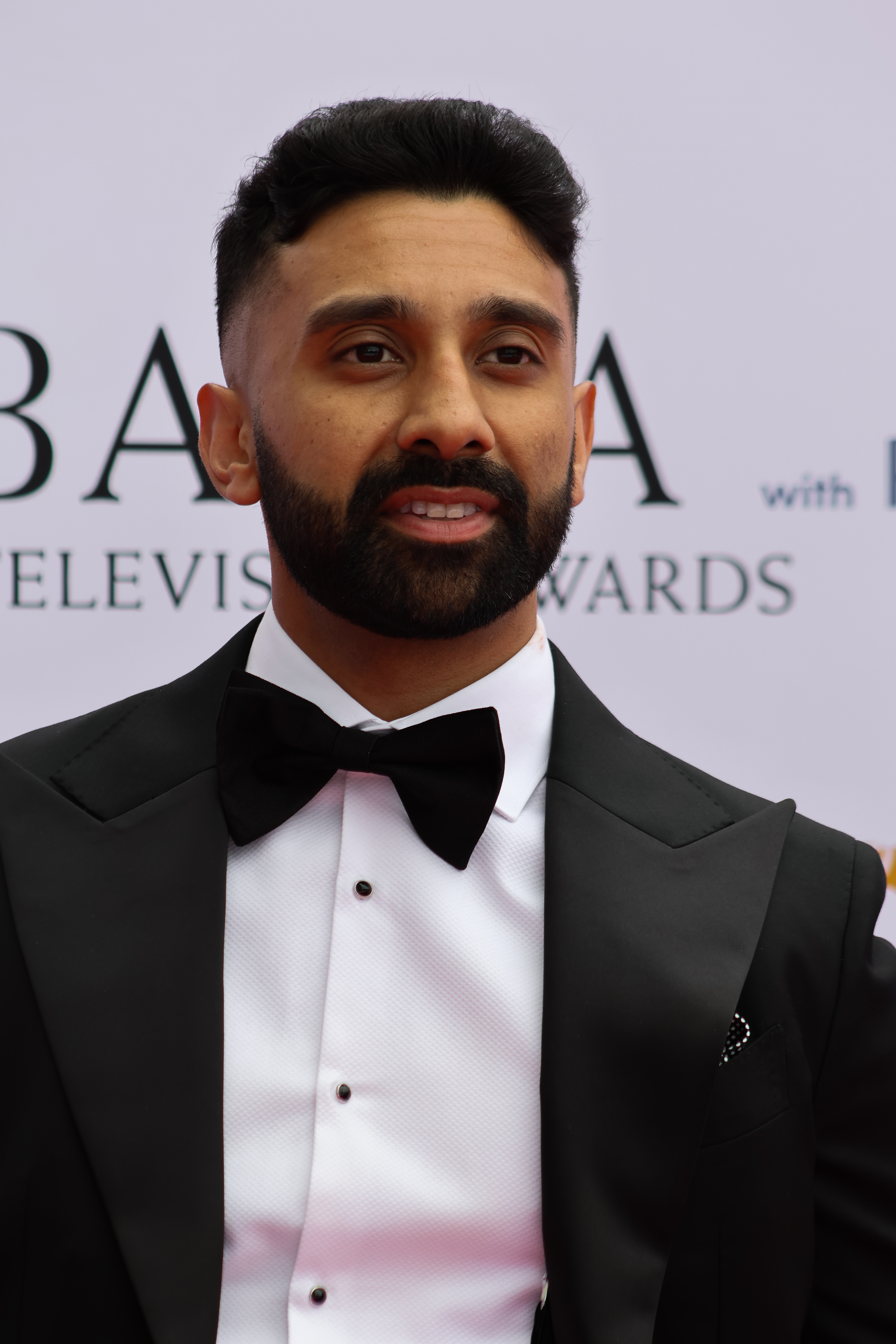
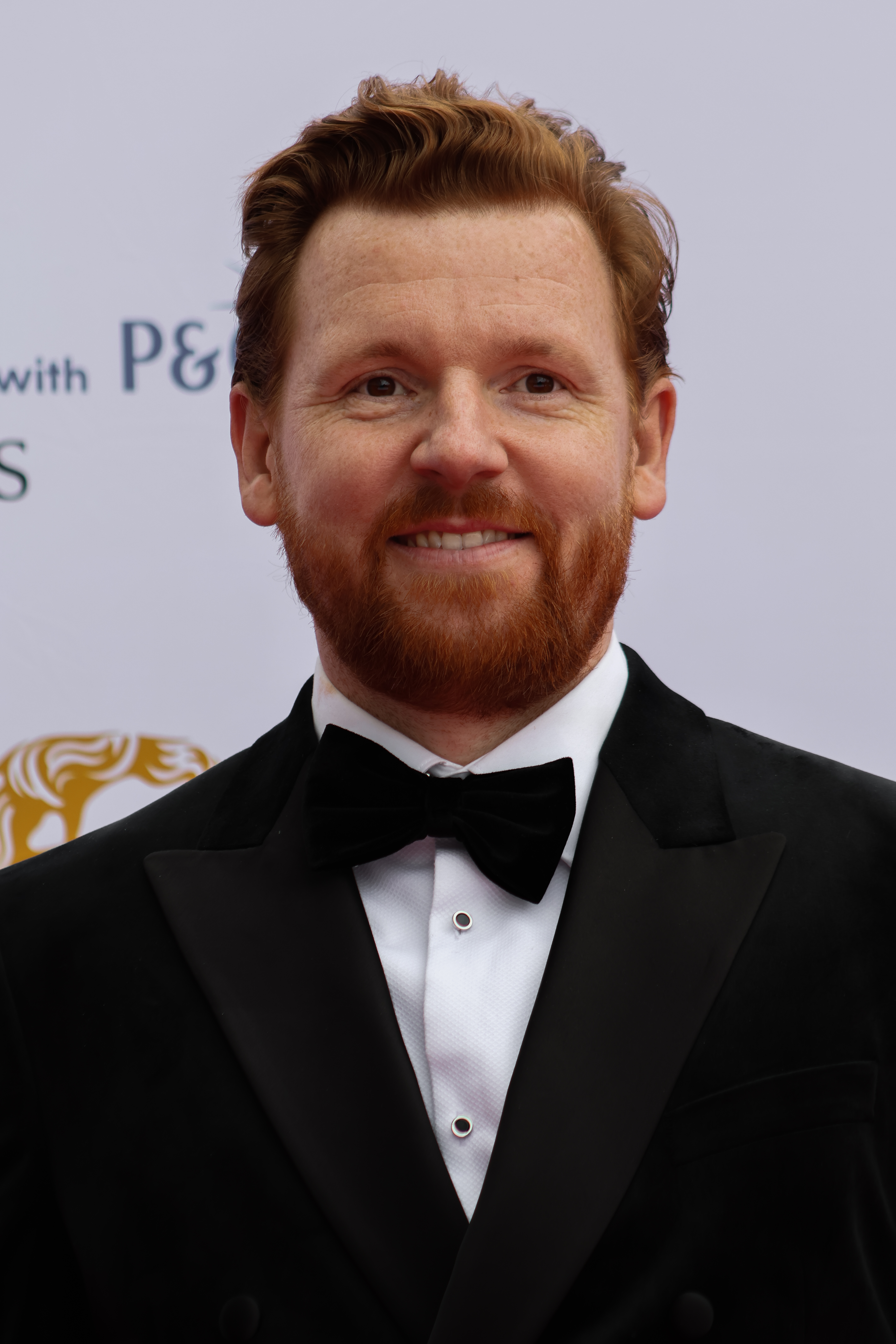
(L-R): Harry Clark, Jaz Singh and Paul Gorton

List of The Traitors contestants
Contestant	Age	Hometown	Occupation	Affiliation	Finish
Aubrey Emerson	67	Loughborough, England	Retired shop owner	Faithful	Murdered (Episode 2)
Sonja Clarke	66	Poulton-le-Fylde, England	Volunteer business mentor	Faithful	Banished (Episode 2)
Kyra Johnson	21	Kent, England	Apprentice economist	Faithful	Murdered (Episode 3)
Brian Davidson	33	Glasgow, Scotland	Photographer	Faithful	Banished (Episode 4)
Ash Bibi	45	London, England	Events coordinator	Traitor	Banished (Episode 5)
Meg Corrick	22	Hereford, England	Illustrator	Faithful	Murdered (Episode 5)
Jonny Holloway	31	Luton, England	Ex-military	Faithful	Banished (Episode 5)
Tracey Griffin	58	Inverness, Scotland	Sonographer & clairvoyant	Faithful	Murdered (Episode 6)
Anthony Mathurin	44	Birmingham, England	Chess coach	Faithful	Banished (Episode 6)
Diane Carson	63	Lytham St Annes, England	Retired teacher	Faithful	Murdered (Episode 7)
Miles Asteri	37	Worcester, England	Veterinary nurse	Traitor (Note: Miles was recruited as a Traitor in Episode 2.)	Banished (Episode 7)
Paul Gorton	36	Manchester, England	Business manager	Traitor	Banished (Episode 8)
Charlie Bees	34	Bristol, England	Mental health area manager	Faithful	Murdered (Episode 9)
Charlotte Chilton	32	Atherstone, England	Recruitment manager	Faithful	Banished (Episode 9)
Ross Carson	28	Lytham St Annes, England	Video director	Traitor (Note: Ross was recruited as a Traitor in Episode 9.)	Banished (Episode 10)
Zack Davies	27	London, England	Parliamentary affairs advisor	Faithful	Murdered (Episode 11)
Jasmine Boatswain	26	London, England	Sales executive	Faithful	Banished (Episode 11)
Evie Morrison	29	Inverness, Scotland	Veterinary nurse	Faithful	Banished (Episode 12)
Andrew Jenkins	45	Talbot Green, Wales	Insurance broker	Traitor (Note: Andrew was recruited as a Traitor in Episode 8.)	Banished (Episode 12)
Jaz Singh	30	Manchester, England	National account manager	Faithful	Banished (Episode 12)
Mollie Pearce	21	Bristol, England	Disability model	Faithful	Runner-up (Episode 12)
Harry Clark	22	Slough, England	British army engineer	Traitor	Winner (Episode 12)

== Elimination history ==
Key

The contestant was a Faithful.
The contestant was a Traitor.
The contestant was ineligible to vote.
The contestant was murdered by the traitors.
The contestant was banished at the round table.

Episode	1	2		3	4		5	6	7	8	9		10	11	12
Traitors' Decision	None	Miles	Aubrey	Kyra	Andrew; Ash; Meg; Paul		Meg	Tracey	Diane (Note: After the Roundtable in Episode 6, the Traitors were tasked to murder someone in plain sight, by getting their victim to drink from ‘The Poisoned Chalice’. The Traitors gave the poison to Diane. However the poison did not work immediately so Diane was present at breakfast the next morning. The players were told that the victim would succumb to the poison at the end of the Funeral Procession Challenge.)	Andrew	Charlie	Ross	None	Zack	None
Traitors' Decision	None	Recruit (Note: The Traitors were required to recruit their final member before being able to murder from the following night.)	Murder		Condemn (Note: Ash, Andrew, Meg and Paul were condemned to the dungeon by the Traitors, meaning they missed the following day's gameplay and were shortlisted for the next murder.)		Murder			Seduce	Murder	Seduce	None	Murder	None
Immune	Harry, Jaz, Kyra	Andrew, Anthony, Paul		Jasmine, Zack	Andrew (Note: Andrew was rescued from the dungeon during the mission, removing him from the murder shortlist. As Ash and Paul were Traitors, Meg was the only player eligible for the subsequent murder.)		Ross	Jasmine	None	Mollie	Harry		None		
Banishment	None	Sonja		Tie	Brian	Ash	Jonny	Anthony	Miles	Paul	Charlotte		Ross	Jasmine	Evie
Vote	None	15–2–2–1–1		4–4–4–3– 1–1–1–1	7–6–3	14–1– 1–1–1	12–2– 1–1	7–3–2– 1–1	9–2–1	7–4	6—2—1		6–1–1	4–1–1	4–1
Harry	No vote	Zack		Zack	Ash	Ash	Jonny	Zack	Miles	Paul	Charlotte		Ross	Jasmine	Evie
Mollie	No vote	Sonja		Anthony	Brian	Ash	Jonny	Anthony	Miles	Paul	Jaz		Ross	Andrew	Evie
Jaz	No vote	Sonja		Brian	Brian	Paul	Jonny	Andrew	Andrew	Paul	Charlotte		Ross	Jasmine	Evie
Andrew	No vote	Sonja		Ash	Ash	Ash	Jonny	Zack	Miles	Jaz	Charlotte		Ross	Jasmine	Evie
Evie	No vote	Sonja		Ash	Ash	Ash	Jonny	Anthony	Paul	Paul	Charlotte		Ross	Jasmine	Andrew
Jasmine	No vote	Sonja		Brian	Brian	Ash	Jonny	Anthony	Miles	Paul	Charlotte		Zack	Evie	Banished (Episode 11)
Zack	No vote	Sonja		Diane	Diane	Meg	Anthony	Anthony	Miles	Paul	Jasmine		Ross	Murdered (Episode 11)	
Ross	No vote	Sonja		Meg	Ash	Ash	Jonny	Anthony	Miles	Jaz	Charlotte		Andrew	Banished (Episode 10)	
Charlotte	No vote	Sonja		Brian	Brian	Ash	Jonny	Anthony	Miles	Paul	Jasmine		Banished (Episode 9)		
Charlie	No vote	Sonja		Diane	Diane	Ash	Anthony	Ross	Miles	Jaz	Murdered (Episode 9)				
Paul	No vote	Sonja		Jaz	Ash	Ash	Jonny	Jaz	Miles	Jaz	Banished (Episode 8)				
Miles	No vote	Sonja		Zack	Brian	Ash	Zack	Anthony	Paul	Banished (Episode 7)					
Diane	No vote	Anthony		Ash	No vote (Note: This contestant was excluded from the vote due to a draw.)	Ash	Jonny	Andrew	Murdered (Episode 7)						
Anthony	No vote	Diane		Zack	Brian	Ash	Jonny	Zack	Banished (Episode 6)						
Tracey	No vote	Anthony		Ash	Ash	Ash	Jonny	Murdered (Episode 6)							
Jonny	No vote	Sonja		Brian	Brian	Ash	Ross	Banished (Episode 5)							
Meg	No vote	Diane		Diane	Diane	Jasmine	Murdered (Episode 5)								
Ash	No vote	Sonja		Diane	No vote	Evie	Banished (Episode 5)								
Brian	No vote	Sonja		Paul	No vote	Banished (Episode 4)									
Kyra	No vote	Sonja		Murdered (Episode 3)											
Sonja	No vote	Ross		Banished (Episode 2)											
Aubrey	No vote	Murdered (Episode 2)													

=== End game ===
Episode	12				
Decision	Banish	Andrew	Banish	Jaz	Game Over; Traitor Win
Vote	4–0	3–1	1–2	2–1	Game Over; Traitor Win
Harry	Banish	Andrew	End Game	Jaz	Winner
Mollie	Banish	Andrew	End Game	Jaz	Runner-up
Jaz	Banish	Andrew	Banish	Harry	Banished
Andrew	Banish	Harry	Banished		

== Missions ==
Episode	Task description	Time limit	Money earned	Money available	Running total	Shield winner(s)
1	Rearrange floating puzzle pieces on water, then light them on fire when done.	30 minutes	£15,000	£15,000	£15,000 of £15,000	Kyra
1	Rearrange floating puzzle pieces on water, then light them on fire when done.	30 minutes	£15,000	£15,000	£15,000 of £15,000	Jaz
1	Rearrange floating puzzle pieces on water, then light them on fire when done.	30 minutes	£15,000	£15,000	£15,000 of £15,000	Harry
2	Guessing correct bird call replicas. A group went to the Castle Grounds and found bird calls. They mimicked them to the castle group who had to find a statuette with a sound of that bird calling. If they got it right, they won £1,000 each time for the prize fund.	Timed rounds	£4,000	£6,000	£19,000 of £21,000	Andrew
2	Guessing correct bird call replicas. A group went to the Castle Grounds and found bird calls. They mimicked them to the castle group who had to find a statuette with a sound of that bird calling. If they got it right, they won £1,000 each time for the prize fund.	Timed rounds	£4,000	£6,000	£19,000 of £21,000	Anthony
2	Guessing correct bird call replicas. A group went to the Castle Grounds and found bird calls. They mimicked them to the castle group who had to find a statuette with a sound of that bird calling. If they got it right, they won £1,000 each time for the prize fund.	Timed rounds	£4,000	£6,000	£19,000 of £21,000	Paul
3	Opinions on other players along the path. They were divided into two groups of seven and one group of six. When the groups answered all the questions correctly, they entered a field of scarecrows. Some scarecrows had money, some scarecrows had shields and some scarecrows had nothing.	20 minutes	£8,000	£10,000	£27,000 of £31,000	Jasmine
3	Opinions on other players along the path. They were divided into two groups of seven and one group of six. When the groups answered all the questions correctly, they entered a field of scarecrows. Some scarecrows had money, some scarecrows had shields and some scarecrows had nothing.	20 minutes	£8,000	£10,000	£27,000 of £31,000	Zack
4	Split into two groups, dig for gold nuggets, then head across rickety platforms over water. Additionally, the winning team had the opportunity to save a condemned player from murder that night.	15 minutes	£5,300	£10,000	£32,300 of £41,000	Andrew (Note: Ash, Andrew, Meg & Paul were condemned to the dungeon by the Traitors – Andrew was saved during the mission by the winning team. With Ash and Paul being Traitors, Meg became the only player eligible for murder.)
5	Find the pieces for and construct a catapult, then fire it at a target in the castle grounds. While collecting the pieces for the catapult, they had the opportunity to collect the shield boxes. After the catapult was completed, the people who collected the shield boxes had to shoot the balls from the shield boxes at the target. Whoever hit closest to the bullseye would receive the shield.	90 minutes	£10,000	£10,000	£42,300 of £51,000	Ross
6	Dig for money bags in a graveyard and bring them back to Claudia while avoiding spotlights. If they were caught, they were out and the money they were carrying would be discarded. Also, one grave had a shield that would apply to whoever brought it to Claudia.	15 minutes	£7,250	£10,000	£49,550 of £61,000	Jasmine
7	In the previous episode, the Traitors were told that their next murder would be in plain sight. They found The Poisoned Chalice in the library, and Miles gave it to Diane. However, Diane did not immediately die and was present for breakfast the next morning. Claudia told the players that one of them had been poisoned and would soon die. In the mission, they figured out who had not been poisoned by the Traitors. The remaining three, Paul, Evie and Diane were told to lie in coffins. The safe players placed a rose in the coffin of the person they thought was poisoned. Diane had the most roses, which was correct. Claudia closed Diane's coffin, so the players won the full £7,000.	—N/a	£7,000	£7,000	£56,550 of £68,000	No Shield on offer
8	Each player's name was on a pane of glass. The players had to attempt to shatter them by firing crossbow bolts, until one name remained and that person won a shield. The players started with £7,000 but lost £100 for each miss.	—N/a	£3,600	£7,000	£60,150 of £75,000	Mollie
9	Go to Claudia’s converted cabin in the woods and go find money in the sewage tunnels. The players split up into two groups, the ones in the cabin had to keep the lights in the sewer on while water and rotten fruit was poured on them. The sewer team had to rummage around for coins, eventually escaping through the well. The players gathered £6,000 but since Evie stayed inside to keep the lights on, this was reduced to £5,000 per the set rules.	30 minutes	£5,000	£8,000	£65,150 of £83,000	Harry
10	Split into pairs and avoid traps while solving puzzles and questions. If they got it right, they could go to the next one. If not, the person who revealed the fate would be trapped.	—N/a	£3,000	£10,000	£68,150 of £93,000	Shield not picked
11	Solve clues and puzzles in the Traitors monument. After the full £7,000 was gained, the monument opened up revealing a stone with numerous swords inside. Claudia told the players one of them was ‘The Sacred Sword’, giving the holder a choice. Harry withdrew the correct sword, and was offered the money won in the mission with no conditions. He declined, and the money went to the prize pot.	—N/a	£7,000	£7,000	£75,150 of £100,000	No Shield on offer
12	Follow the path to the boat and raise the flag for £10,000. The players could take diversions along the path to find more flags to take to the boat, with a possible extra £10,000. The players collected all of the flags, and received an extra £10,000.	60 minutes	£20,000	£20,000	£95,150 of £120,000	No Shield on offer

== Episodes ==
No. overall	No. in series	Title	Original release date	UK viewers (millions)
13	1	"Episode 1"	3 January 2024	6.22
22 contestants arrived at the castle to play the ultimate murder mystery. Upon arrival, Claudia asked the players to line up based on how well they thought they’d do in the competition. Despite fearing a repeat of Kieran and Amos’ immediate eliminations in the previous series, the players did so. Claudia reassured them that they wouldn’t do the same thing two years in a row and all players entered the game. At the selection, Harry, Paul & Ash were chosen as traitors. Claudia announced that the traitors would also ask one of the faithful to join them in the turret as another traitor the next night when the first murder would take place. Ash started to fall under suspicion almost immediately due to her reactions after the selection. The three traitors met up to discuss who to recruit. They debated between Sonja, Miles, Diane, and Andrew. The audience is not initially informed who has been chosen. At breakfast the next day, Sonja walked up to Ash and asked to her face if she was a traitor startling her and she pretended she didn’t hear the question. In her confessional, Sonja explained she had just been joking and had asked a few people. Shield Mission: The contestants had to build a giant beacon at the centre of the Loch made of floating pontoon puzzle pieces. They had to get the shape right and all exit the water before the beacon could be lit. There were three shields hidden around the mission sight. At the start, players were tied to poles and had to free themselves. The players banked £15,000. Kyra, Harry, and Jaz got shields. Kyra came under suspicion for running for a shield when some players were still tied up. Zack, after Evie and Ross either misheard or misquoted what he said about sleeping easy that night. Anthony got defensive when Zack jokingly brought up how he’d heard Anthony had struggled with rowing during the mission. Sonja for also stirring the pot by repeatedly bringing up Zack’s name. Aubrey said to Ash and Jasmine that he was certain he’d spotted the traitors after the selection but did not give out any names. The episode ended on a cliffhanger as the fourth traitor joined them.
14	2	"Episode 2"	4 January 2024 (Note: This episode was released on BBC iPlayer on 3 January 2024.)	5.91
Miles was revealed to have been recruited and was surprised by the identities of the other three traitors. The traitors debated murdering Sonja, Diane or Aubrey. They chose to murder Aubrey based on what he had said to Ash. The fact that Sonja had brought up Zack’s comments meant that Ross believed she was a traitor stirring the pot. Diane thought that Anthony could be a traitor thinking that someone with an ego would want to be a traitor. She also believed that Ash was a traitor because she only spoke to very few people and told these suspicions to Harry, Paul, and Jaz. Shield Mission: The contestants were split in half. The Ground Team was split into groups of three and used maps to navigate to find a bird noise. They would mimic the noise for the Castle Team who had to run and find the statue that matched the noise. Only the nine people in the Ground Team would have the chance to get a shield. They won £4000. Andrew, Paul, and Anthony got the shields. Due to the shield situation, Zack was annoyed by how Kyra and Harry went into the Ground Team despite having previously had shields. Kyra found this behavior suspicious. Because Andrew had said that they should ignore the shields at the start but then immediately went for the shields. Kyra believed this made Andrew suspicious. Charlotte thought Anthony’s demeanour had changed and was suspicious. At the round table: Dianne and Charlotte accused Anthony; Kyra and Paul brought up how Andrew had seemingly flipped on the idea of getting the shields; Zack called out Kyra for her argument being hypocritical; Ross accused Sonja for stirring the pot with what Zack had said. Ash said that Sonja accusing people directly of being a traitor was suspicious. Jonny said that if Sonja wasn’t a traitor he would be suspicious of Ross for going so hard on the Sonja theory. Sonja was banished with 15 votes. Afterwards, Zack speculated that Diane and Paul were mother and son. Ross was suspicious of Jonny. The traitors met to discuss who to murder. Harry warned Ash that her name had been brought up a few times. They debated murdering Jonny, Kyra, and Meg.
15	3	"Episode 3"	5 January 2024	5.94
The traitors chose to murder Kyra because of her strong presence at the round table. At breakfast, Anthony tried to clear the air with Diane but she still didn’t trust him. Because Diane cheered when Sonja revealed she was a faithful, this was seen as suspicious. Diane had cheered because she was glad to be proven right that Sonja was a faithful after vouching for her. Tracey, a psychic, believed that Ash was suspicious because she couldn’t get a read on her. Paul mentioned to Diane that Zack thought they were mother and son making them both laugh. In a confessional, Diane scoffed at the idea that Paul was her son before adding “but Ross is” revealing that they had entered the game together. Shield Mission: The players were split into three teams and follow a path to a field of gold. At forks in the road, they would find lockboxes with questions about their fellow players they had all answered. They would have to pick up the scarecrow with the name they thought was right and carry it to the next box to unlock it. At the field, they would rip out the hearts of gold from rows of scarecrow or find shields. They banked £8000 and Zack and Jasmine got shields. Charlotte was annoyed that Zack told her to ignore shields while getting one himself. Some of the answers in the mission had a ripple effect. Brian was voted “the biggest sheep” which sent him spiralling as he became paranoid that his name was now at the forefront and thought he should speak more at the round table. Paul was voted “most popular”. While trying to deflect from himself, Paul said loud people who became quiet might be traitors. Diane said that Ash fit the description and was convinced she was a traitor. Charlotte was suspicious of Zack for the shield thing and because he had joked “the final supper” when she mentioned the roast dinner they were eating. Jonny told Miles he was suspicious of Ash. Evie was also of suspicious of Ash. At the round table: Brian started by mentioning he was a little offended at the sheep comment during the mission; Tracey accused Ash of being a traitor for the way she moved around the castle and contradicting herself in her defense; Charlotte accused Zack for his weird behavior; Jasmine suspected Brian because he seemed nervous while Jonny suspected him because he thought he was confident; Charlie brought up how Diane cheered when Sonja left; Ross suspected Meg; Paul accused Jaz for his energy changing and becoming quieter. Right as Claudia was about to end the discussion, Brain asked for a “selfish moment” and asked to know who else in the group thought he was a traitor. Everyone was confused and frustrated by his outburst. 8 players received votes: Brian, Ash, Diane, Paul, Zack, Anthony, Jaz, and Meg. This led to a three way tie between Ash, Brian and Diane who received four votes each. Claudia announced the players, excluding those three, would vote again for only one of them and the tied players would give one final plea. If there was still a tie, it would come down to chance. In the revote; Diane received three votes and Brian and Ash ended up with six votes each with Harry and Paul both voting for Ash. The episode ended with Anthony’s deciding vote yet to be revealed.
16	4	"Episode 4"	10 January 2024	6.54
Anthony voted for Brian. Brian was banished and revealed as a faithful. Paul and Harry thought Ash wasn’t as strong as they were while Miles worried that their votes would divide the team. After the round table, Ash was upset and Harry subtly tried to apologise while Paul told Jonny they were close to getting out a traitor and it was probably Ash. In the turret, Ash was angry that Harry and Paul had chosen to throw her under the bus and confronted them. Paul and Harry tried to explain themselves. Claudia told them that instead of a murder they would condemn four players to be isolated in the dungeon. They would only be able to murder one of the four, and one person could be saved in the next mission. Paul decided to risk going in the dungeon. Since he was voted “most popular” he thought it would track that he would be put in the dungeon and believed the players would choose to save him. Ash also decided to put herself in the dungeon. Andrew and Meg were also chosen with the plan being to save Paul, murder Andrew, and Harry and Miles would work to frame Meg. However, Paul also planned for Ash to be banished. At breakfast, Claudia announced the what had happened to the four condemned players and that the rest of the group could save one of them from murder. The Condemned would be briefly released to take part in the round table. The Faithful were immediately suspicious that a traitor had put themselves in the dungeon. Charlie and Tracey were certain that either Ash or Meg were a traitor. Zack brought up Paul’s name to Harry, Ross and Jonny as someone flying under the radar since everyone like him. Jaz separately brought up Paul to Miles and Jasmine because of how confident he seemed. Harry and Miles quickly realised they had made a mistake with the dungeon selection. In the dungeon, Meg thought all of them were probably faithful while Andrew was certain that Meg or Ash or both were traitors. Ash said that Meg was the odd one out of the three. Paul was confident he would be saved and Ash and Meg would be banished. Harry tried to sway the group to suspect Meg. Rescue Mission: The players were split into two teams and had to dig through dirt to get golden nuggets and carry them across wobbly bridges. The team that got the most gold would decide who to rescue from the dungeon. Harry and Miles were on the blue team but the red team won. The red team, which had both Jaz and Zack, decided to save Andrew which immediately caused the dungeon plan to fall apart. The faithful were determined to banish the traitor they believed was in the dungeon. Realising that if Meg was banished that night, both Ash and Paul would be exposed as traitors led to Miles and Harry immediately having to change their plan and arrange for either Ash or Paul to be banished. Jaz asserted that he was suspicious of Paul to a few players. Ross wondered if the traitors would try and protect who was in the dungeon while Mollie pointed out they might not want to save each other. At the round table: The Dungeon Four were brought back were told that Andrew had been saved. Zack brought up Paul’s names for being confident; Harry accused Ash of condemning herself; Paul claimed that Ash hadn’t seemed surprised about the dungeon, that her behavior wasn’t genuine and she’d contradicted herself previously; Ash tried to point to quiet players like Evie; Meg was accused for being quiet; Jonny was also accused. Ash was banished with 14 votes. All three traitors voted for her while Jaz voted for Paul.
17	5	"Episode 5"	11 January 2024	6.56
Ash revealed she was a traitor greatly exciting the faithfuls. The faithfuls were also gleeful that the Traitors Gambit had seemingly fallen apart because Paul was so obviously a faithful compared to Meg. The next day, everyone was certain that Paul had been murdered and Meg was a traitor. Zack believed that if Paul came back he was a traitor though Diane and Andrew doubted this. Everyone was shocked when Paul walked in and realised Meg had been murdered. However the majority of players still trusted Paul and only a small minority were suspicious. Jaz was frustrated that no one else seemed to be suspicious of Paul for returning. Ross was suspicious of Jonny for changing his behaviour in and outside of the round table and heavily pushed this theory. Harry did not want to banish Jonny due to both of them having served in the army. He had also become good friends with Mollie. Shield Mission: The players had to gather the pieces to complete and launch a giant catapult in 90 minutes. The players earned the full £10,000 and Ross got the shield. Jonny was suspected a lot going into the round table. In his confessional, Miles worried about another deadlock situation in the voting. At the round table: Ross accused Jonny very strongly; Miles accused Zack; Anthony and Jaz brought up the “elephant in the room” of Paul having returned from the dungeon; Paul said it would be tough if Jonny was revealed as a traitor but Zack called him out on this; Zack accused Anthony of dodging questions. Jonny was banished with 12 votes and Harry voted for him. He revealed himself as a faithful shocking Ross. Harry was very upset after Jonny was banished convincing many players that he was a faithful. After the round table, Jaz continued to push that Paul was very likely a traitor. He told several players one-on-one, including Harry at the last minute, that if he was murdered Paul was a traitor. In the turret, Harry told Paul about what Jaz had said. The traitors considered murdering Diane, Tracey and Charlotte.
18	6	"Episode 6"	12 January 2024	6.70
The next day, it was revealed that the traitors had murdered Tracey. Zack and Anthony were suspicious of each other; Diane suspected Andrew for going under the radar while privately wondering if Ross might be a traitor protecting her. Shield Mission: At night, the players had to dig gold out of graves and run back while avoiding a searchlight that would eliminate them from the mission and forfeit any money they were carrying. The players banked £7,250 and Jasmine got the shield. Many players were annoyed by Miles for shouting instructions about where the spotlight was as opposed to helping dig for gold. A lot of players were also irritated by Zack and Anthony. At the round table; Charlie suspected Ross; Harry accused Zack; Diane, Jaz and Charlotte accused Andrew; Jaz also accused Paul; Paul countered by accusing Jaz; Jasmine brought up Anthony by changing since the train journey. Anthony was banished with 7 votes and revealed he was a faithful. After the round table, since Paul and Jaz had voted for each other, Paul tried to clear the air between them. He mentioned that Harry had told him Jaz was still suspicious immediately alerting Jaz who wondered why Harry had shared this information with Paul. He also wondered why Paul had let it slip it was Harry who told him that and why Paul didn’t bring it up at the round table. The players discussed what they would do with the money with Jaz sharing a personal story about his family. The traitors were told they had to murder in plain sight by finding a poisoned chalice in the library and giving it to a faithful who would be murdered when they drank from it. The traitors hastily met up at the fire pit to discuss who and how they would do it. Miles agreed to carry out the murder but the three struggled to find the books that the chalice was hidden in. Eventually finding the chalice, Miles picked Diane but it was left on a cliff hanger whether she had successfully been murdered.
19	7	"Episode 7"	17 January 2024	7.17
It was revealed that Diane did drink from the poisoned chalice. Claudia revealed to the audience that Diane would not have died immediately and would show up for breakfast. At breakfast, the traitors, particularly Miles, were confused and startled that Diane was still present. The faithful were confused when no one was dead and wondered if there had been a recruitment. Claudia came in and explained that someone was murdered in plain sight with a slow acting poison and would be dead by the end of the mission. Everyone began theorising how the murder had happened. Harry mentioned pouring a tea or coffee which got everyone thinking about drinks and stuck. Players who had handed out drinks came under suspicion. Diane told several players that Miles had given her a drink. Mission; The players walked on a funeral procession and work out through process of elimination who the murder victim was by answering questions. If the victim was correctly identified then they would win money. The final three candidates had to lie in coffins with the lid of the murdered player being slammed shut. The players correctly guessed that Diane had been murdered and banked the full £7000. During the procession, Harry put attention on who had served drinks while Diane quietly told Evie and Paul that if she died it was Miles and it Paul died it was Jaz. Paul spread this information to the rest of the group. Most players concluded that Miles was who had poisoned although Zack, Jaz and Mollie were also suspicious of Paul. At the round table: Miles and Paul clashed accusing each other; Evie was briefly suspected for also giving Diane a drink; while Paul and Miles were arguing Harry whispered to Zack that it could be two traitors clashing; Zack then brought up the Dungeon again. Miles was banished with nine votes and revealed he was a traitor. Jaz, who had said he thought Miles was not a traitor, was worried he had doomed himself and that Paul was now in a strong position and also doubted his suspicions as he was so wrong. Several players believed Paul was a faithful for helping eliminate Miles. Harry brought up the traitor vs traitor theory to several players. In the turret, Harry suggested they recruit a player to throw under the bus before the final. They decided to recruit between Jasmine, Andrew, Zack or Ross.
20	8	"Episode 8"	18 January 2024	7.16
It was revealed that the traitors had successfully recruited Andrew who was shocked by their identities. Paul tried to reassure Andrew as to their reasoning for turning on two fellow traitors. Andrew worried that he would also be thrown under the bus. Harry worried that they had made mistake by recruiting Andrew. The next morning, the faithful quickly deduced that there had been a recruitment. Most players suspected that Charlotte had been recruited. Zack and Jaz both decided to accuse Paul at the next round table but wondered if they could get enough support since many players suspected them. In the car on the way to the mission, Jasmine, Charlotte, Paul and Ross joked about Diane being like a mum to them with Ross cheekily winking at the camera unnoticed by any of them. Shield Mission: The players had to fire a crossbow at the stained glass windows of each others names. The last name remaining would be shielded from murder. The players started with £7000 with £100 being deducted for every miss. Mollie ended up with the shield but due to many misses, the players only ended up winning £3,650. During the mission, Harry made a joke about feeling targeted when many players tried to break his window which Paul jumped on in the car. Back at the castle, he tried to reassure Andrew and trust him. Andrew was unable to trust Paul based on how he turned on all other traitors. Paul suggested to Zack that Jaz could be a traitor and seemed confident most players would be voting for him. However, most players had become incredibly suspicious of Paul. Charlotte mentioned to Harry that Paul had started bringing his name up in the car. At the round table: Charlie brought up suspicions on Charlotte who brought up her own suspicions on Paul; Harry then delivered a direct accusation using the evidence of the Dungeon, Paul’s behaviour in defending himself, how Paul had only been loud at the round table when it was a definite traitor he was going for, for stirring the pot on Jaz, Zack and Harry, and that Paul might have been keeping him in. Harry’s accusation caught both of his fellow traitors off guard; Jaz accused Paul based on wondering if his suspicions of him had been what was keeping him in and how Paul had seemed 100% certain on Miles; Zack and Mollie pointed out that Diane’s last words couldn’t have been reliable but Paul was still very confident; Ross defended Paul and put suspicions on Jaz for his strange voting record. Paul was banished with seven votes with Harry voting for Paul and the remaining four votes going to Jaz. He revealed he was a traitor to the extreme jubilation of the faithful, particularly Jaz. Ross worried that by defending Paul he was likely going to be banished next. In the turret, Harry and Andrew debated between murdering Zack or Charlie.
21	9	"Episode 9"	19 January 2024	7.24
The next morning Charlie was murdered. Mollie felt guilty since she had narrowly won the shield over her in the previous mission. Some players were surprised that Harry wasn’t murdered. Charlotte was also upset that Charlie was gone. Everyone was confused as to why Charlie had gone and thought Charlotte was a recruited traitor who had murdered her friend to deflect suspicion. Since Paul had been confirmed as a traitor, Jaz recalled what he had said to him about Harry leaking what Jaz had said. Jaz had correctly deduced that Harry was a traitor and had told Paul in the turret. He voiced his concerns to Zack and Evie but both dismissed the idea. Charlotte suspected Jasmine for supposedly flipping her vote to Paul despite planning to vote for Jaz originally. Shield Mission: Set in Claudia’s cabin, the players split into two teams. One team stayed in the cabin to read a map while the remaining players crawled through tunnels filled with disgusting things to get gold and then find the exit to and have everyone escape the cabin. However, someone in the cabin had to hold down a switch to cut the power to the cabin and light up the tunnel for the other team. When the power was out in the cabin water and smelly things would be thrown in them. Only the Tunnel Team could get a shield. During the mission, Harry secretly pocketed the shield with only Mollie seeing him do so but he told her not tell anyone. The players banked £5000. Everyone wondered who has got the shield with some suspicion on Harry as a good choice for a traitor. Harry secretly told Zack and Jaz that he had got the shield telling them he planned to catch the traitors off guard if they tried to kill him. However his true plan was to hide a recruitment as a murder attempt on himself. At the round table: Jasmine and Charlotte accused each other; Mollie pointed out how secretive Jaz was while also voicing her suspicions on Charlotte; Zack wondered why Mollie hadn’t shared her suspicions before. Charlotte was banished with 6 votes and revealed she was a faithful. After the round table: Suspicion fell on Ross for his many wrong guesses and a potential candidate for the Recruited Traitor since he and Paul were close. Harry and Andrew chose to recruit Ross. They planned to banish a faithful at the next round table and then chuck Ross in the table before the final. Ross accepted the offer planning to get revenge for the murder of his mother. He was shocked by the reveal of Harry and Andrew and asked their reasoning behind certain murders, particularly Diane’s. Harry’s response about Diane getting too brave and putting her in her place motivated Ross to turn on both Harry and Andrew.
22	10	"Episode 10"	24 January 2024	7.56
The next morning, Harry’s Shield Gambit worked with the faithful assuming Harry had shielded his murder. Zack immediately believed the traitor couldn’t be someone who knew about the shield - him, Mollie, Jaz or Andrew - so had to be one of the other players. Ross came under suspicion almost instantly. Jasmine and Zack argued. Ross got into a discussion with Jaz and Jasmine about Harry being a traitor with him bringing up a ‘possible’ recruitment. Meanwhile, Harry and Andrew plotted on banishing Ross. Shield Mission: The players were paired up and sent through the forest carrying gold to answer trivia questions. If they got it wrong, one of the pair would get trapped. They could also risk their gold on getting a shield at the last question. Only Andrew made it through the mission with any money banking £2000. Every other player was caught with Zack accidentally holding the money he and Jaz had when he was trapped. Jaz tried to go for the shield but got the question wrong. At the castle, Andrew mentioned Harry to several players while Ross also brought his name up. However, most players were convinced he was a faithful. Ross and Andrew met up and discussed how Harry would probably throw them both under the bus. Ross then met up with Harry and reported the conversation back to him hoping to divide the pair. However, Harry was put off by how Ross was openly speaking as a traitor when anyone could walk in and immediately regrouped with Andrew. At the round table; Most of the discussion devolved into an argument about whether the traitors would try and murder Harry unknowingly or knowingly hit his shield to cast suspicion on those who didn’t know about it. Suspicion heavily fell on Ross for his many mistakes in accusations and defenses that he had, ironically, made when he was still a faithful; Harry called out Ross for telling him that Andrew thought he was moving “elusive” and Andrew heavily denied this. Ross was banished with 6 votes. He revealed that he was Diane’s son and that he was a traitor. Andrew admitted in his confessional he wasn’t handling the pressure of being a traitor well. Though there was suspicion on Andrew, most players suspected Jasmine as the “one remaining” traitor. With her likely to be banished, Harry and Andrew debated murdering Zack, Jaz or Mollie.
23	11	"Episode 11"	25 January 2024	7.71
The next morning, it was revealed that the traitors had murdered Zack. Most of the initial suspicion around him had died down, Jaz was still suspected by some players, and Mollie was Harry’s greatest faithful ally in the game. Jasmine fell under suspicion for being the only person to vote for Zack. Mollie suspected Andrew. Harry and Mollie made a promise to go to endgame together with Mollie confident that he was the only person she wanted to end the game with. Jasmine wondered if Zack had been right with his theory which left Evie as the only person other than herself who hadn’t known about it. Evie suspected Jasmine in turn for the same reason. Mission: The players had to unlock the traitors monument by answering questions, solving riddles, and reciting the order of the murdered players within 40 minutes. The players succeeded and the monument unlocked to reveal a stone with daggers in it. If a player pulled out a full dagger they would have to make a tough choice. Harry pulled the dagger and was asked whether to take the mission’s £7000 for himself or add it to the prize pot. Harry chooses to let the team earn the money earning a lot of praise and trust from the faithful. There was no shield available as there would be no murder. Andrew and Harry’s alliance was a little shaky since, with one traitor left to find, no one would want to end the game without another successful banishment. Jaz was still highly suspicious of Harry but doubted he had enough support to get him banished without risking his own banishment. Andrew voiced ‘suspicions’ about Harry to Evie and Jaz but Jaz kept his own theories close to his chest. At the round table: it came down to a choice between Evie and Jasmine. Jasmine argued that several players had defended traitors unintentionally and that shouldn’t make them traitors; Evie argued it could be a bluff by breaking the mold and pointed out her voting record for ousting traitors was better than Jasmine’s; Jasmine countered that would be easy to do if Evie was a traitor; it was also pointed out that Ash had once mentioned Evie’s name near the start; Andrew came under suspicion due to Ross’ comments but it was seen as him potentially trying to protect Jasmine. Jasmine was banished with 4 votes and revealed she was a faithful. The five remaining players had a dinner party sharing their personal stories and discussed what they would do with the money and toasted their success.
24	12	"Episode 12"	26 January 2024	8.16
The five finalists met up. Evie was under the most suspicion due to the Shield Gambit. Andrew was under suspicion for what Ross had said and was worried Harry would betray him at the last minute given his record of backstabbing fellow traitors. Harry discussed the idea of Andrew being a traitor with Jaz. Though the two agreed it was either Evie or Andrew, Jaz was still certain Harry was a traitor due to his (correct) theory about the turret conversation. Final Mission: The players had to follow the path to the boat and raise the flag for £10,000. The players could take diversions along the path to find more flags to take to the boat, with a possible extra £10,000 though this would take more time. The players succeeded and collected all of the flags bringing the final prize pot to £95,150. Ahead of the final round table, Mollie confirmed that Harry was the only player she fully trusted to end the game with. Since Mollie suspected Andrew the most, Harry doubted that both traitors could win. Since Mollie had never received a single vote at the round table and was still under no suspicion, it became a question of who would be at the endgame with her. Jaz worried that Mollie’s trust in Harry would case his own banishment. Privately, he spoke to her, telling her she was the one he trusted the most, and asked her to watch the reaction of he accused at the round table. Mollie was unsure whether or not to trust Jaz. In person, Harry and Andrew reassured each other that they had each other’s backs but in their confessionals were unsure if they could trust each other. At the round table: Evie defended herself from suspicions as she was the only one left who hadn’t known about Harry’s shield; Evie brought up suspicions about Andrew; Jaz revealed his suspicions about Harry by asking him if he had reported their conversation to Paul. Harry denied it. Jaz then revealed that Paul had told him Harry had reported it and wondered if Paul had been attempting to throw a fellow traitor under the bus. Harry claimed Paul was throwing out multiple names. Harry regretted having underestimated Jaz and not murdering him. Ultimately, Evie was banished with four votes and revealed she was a faithful. Before the endgame, Harry and Andrew suggested everyone could be faithful but, due to Zack’s murder, this was impossible. Due to Jaz’s questioning, Andrew worried Harry would go on the offensive and oust him so decided to do the same. Harry and Mollie discussed who they trusted more out of Andrew and Jaz. Andrew went to Jaz and told him that he was onto something with Harry Jaz was suspicious by how abruptly Andrew had approached him and noted it fit the pattern of traitors taking each other out. At the fire pit, everyone voted to banish again. When asked why, everyone confirmed the belief that there was still one traitor left but Andrew accused Harry. Andrew was banished with 3 votes and revealed he was a traitor. Another vote was cast on whether to end the game. Harry and Mollie voted to end the game. Jaz voted to banish again because he was only confident to end the game with Mollie and traitors had been backstabbing each other. As the deciding vote, Mollie did not think either of them were traitors and was extremely torn on who to vote for. Jaz voted for Harry. Harry voted for Jaz. Despite initially writing Harry’s name, Mollie changed her mind at the last second and voted for Jaz. Jaz was banished and revealed he was a faithful. The game automatically ended with two players. Mollie revealed she was a faithful. Harry revealed he was a traitor. Mollie immediately left the room upset. Harry did feel guilty about upsetting Mollie and hoped he could rebuild trust with her outside of the game. Harry was the first Traitor winner of the UK series winning the full prize pot.

The first three episodes were released simultaneously on 3 January on BBC iPlayer.

The final on 26 January was also shown in a number of independent cinemas, including the Mockingbird Cinema, Birmingham, Catford Mews, Lewisham, the Ealing Project and Reading Biscuit Factory.

== Ratings ==
Weekly ratings for each show on BBC One. All ratings are provided by BARB.

Episode	Date	Official rating (millions)	Weekly rank for BBC One	Weekly rank for all UK TV
Episode 1	3 January	6.22	3	9
Episode 2	4 January	5.91	5	11
Episode 3	5 January	5.94	4	10
Episode 4	10 January	6.54	5	6
Episode 5	11 January	6.56	4	5
Episode 6	12 January	6.70	2	2
Episode 7	17 January	7.17	3	3
Episode 8	18 January	7.16	4	4
Episode 9	19 January	7.24	2	2
Episode 10	24 January	7.56	3	3
Episode 11	25 January	7.71	2	2
Episode 12	26 January	8.16	1	1
Series average	2024	6.91	—N/a	—N/a
