= Strathrusdale =

Coordinates: 57.75°N 4.40°W

Strathrusdale: Scottish Gaelic: Strath Rùsdail
- Location within the Highland council area
- Population: 30 (est.)
- OS grid reference: NH6174
- Council area: Highland
- Lieutenancy area: Ross and Cromarty
- Country: Scotland
- Sovereign state: United Kingdom
- Post town: Alness
- Postcode district: IV17
- Dialling code: 01349
- Police: Scotland
- Fire: Scottish
- Ambulance: Scottish
- UK Parliament: Caithness, Sutherland and Easter Ross
- Scottish Parliament: Ross, Skye and Inverness West

Strathrusdale (Brittonic or Scottish Gaelic/Old Norse Hybrid: Strath Rùsdail, Strath, [Brittonic/Gaelic] small valley, of Rusdale, rus, Norse for [male sheep] ram, and dale, also small valley) Glen in the Highlands of Scotland forming the western part of the area known as Ardross. The Strath runs east to west for 2.5 miles and the river Blackwater flows through it to merge at the eastern end with another tributary to form the River Alness. The floor of the strath is mainly fields used for sheep grazing. The strath is surrounded by commercial pine forest, except to the north, which is dominated by the mountain Beinn Tharsuinn (2831 ft). Traditionally the strath was populated by tenant crofters, however in recent years there has been an increase in the number of new homes and restorations, after many decades of gradual decline.

== History ==
=== The Picts ===
Earliest evidence of habitation are still visible in Strathrusdale at the eastern end of the Strath, where there are a number of stone circles, which formed the base of Pictish roundhouses. Picts lived in the area until the 10th century, which was part of the Kingdom of Fortriu. After this period there was progressively more transition as Norse settlement began to increase in the area.

=== Highland Clearances ===
During the late 18th century, great change swept the Highlands when landowners realised that more income could be generated by clearing areas farmed by tenant crofters to make way for sheep. Termed the Highland Clearances, this coincided with a period of great unrest and social upheaval in Europe, which unsettled the authorities in Britain.

Strathrusdale became the focus of the clearance policy in 1792 when on the 27th of July the inhabitants of the strath gathered for a wedding in the area where a plot was devised to drive away all the sheep, and by implication all the sheep-farmers. This issue had arisen when, in May 1792, the brothers Captain Allan and Alexander Cameron who were leasing the neighbouring lands of Kildermorie from Hector Munro, 8th laird of Novar had driven away the cattle belonging to the Strathrusdale people. The men of Strathrusdale had gathered reinforcements from Ardross and upon arriving at Kildermorie found their cattle were being guarded by the Camerons. The Strathrusdale men were led by Alexander Wallace, known as "Big Wallace" and although the Camerons were powerful men they were too few in number and had to yield. However, one of the Camerons was armed with a loaded gun and a foot long dirk. Wallace grappled with him, disarmed him and the Strathrusdale men recovered their cattle. A week after the meeting of 27 July, about 400 men from the surrounding districts were driving six thousand sheep from the counties of Ross and Sutherland towards Beauly in the county of Inverness-shire. The sheriff-depute of the county, Donald MacLeod, wrote to the Lord Advocate, asking that a force of the 42nd (Black Watch) Regiment from the army be sent north to defeat what MacLeod viewed as open rebellion. The Lord Advocate wrote to the Home Secretary Henry Dundas reporting that sheep farming was very unpopular in the Highlands, as it "tended to remove the inhabitants from their small possessions and dwelling houses". The Home Secretary replied that it was "undisputably necessary that the most vigorous and effectual measures should be taken for bringing these daring offenders to punishment" - and ordered troops north. After a midnight attack on Saturday 6 August by troops of the 42nd Black Watch, the drovers scattered and returned to their crofts. The Inverness County Sheriff Court Records show that six men were given punishments for driving the sheep away: Hugh Breck Mackenzie and John Aird were both ordered to be transported for seven years "beyond seas to such places as His Majesty shall appoint" and that if they returned to Britain within these seven years that they would be sentenced to death. Malcolm Ross was fined £50 and held in prison for one month, while William Cunningham was imprisoned for three years. Donald Munro and Alexander Mackay were both banished from Scotland for the rest of their lives. These events were known as the Ross-shire Sheep Riots but later became known as The Year of the Sheep.

== Gallery ==
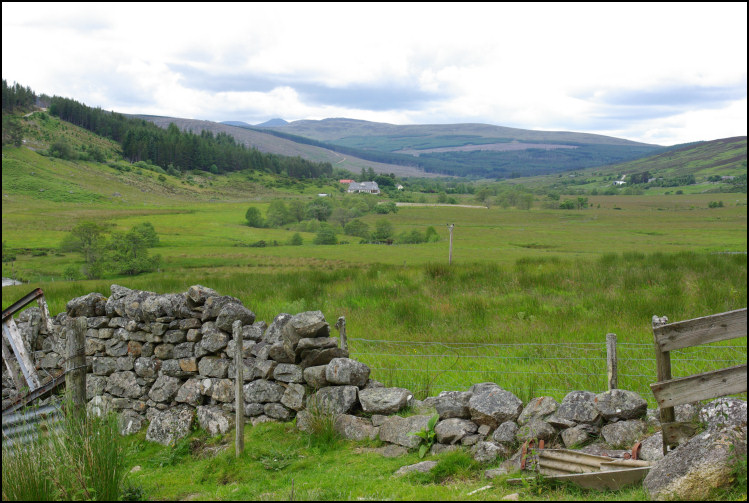
Strathrusdale looking west

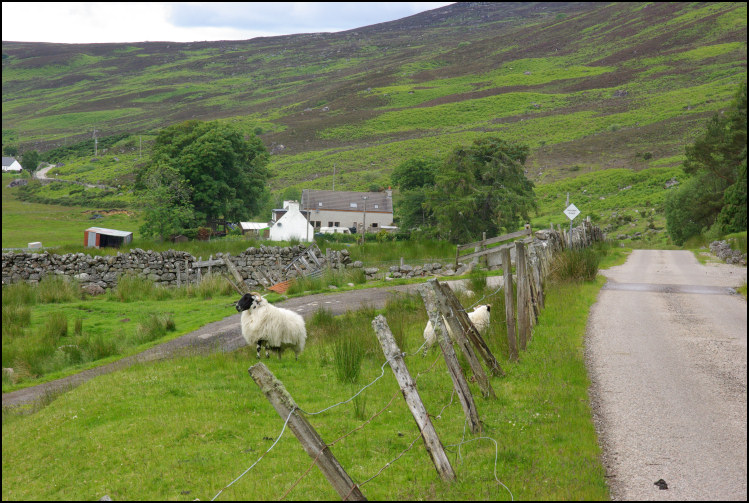
Access road on northern side of glen
