= Eleftherios Foulidis =

Greek icon painter

Eleftherios Foulidis (Greek: Ελευθέριος Φουλίδης, born 1948) is a Greek icon painter in the Orthodox tradition. He is from Drepano, Kozani and is based in London, United Kingdom.

== Early life and work in Greece ==
Foulidis took his first impressions and practical art lessons from his father Theofilos, who was a stage designer for the National Theatre of North Greece. He later took lessons from a student of icon painter Photios Kontoglou.

In his own regional capital city of Kozani and the surrounding region, he painted over 30 churches and the Historical - Folklore and Natural History Museum of Kozani.

== Work in the United Kingdom ==
Since 1987, Foulidis has lived in London, United Kingdom with his family. He has painted icons for or otherwise decorated churches of the Greek Orthodox Archdiocese of Thyateira and Great Britain, such as the Church of St. John the Baptist in North London, the Cathedral of the Holy Cross and St. Michael in Golders Green (where he decorated the church and painted the chapel of Saint Thecla), and the Church of the Twelve Apostles in Hatfield, Hertfordshire.

== Work elsewhere ==
Foulidis's work can also be found in Greek Orthodox Churches in Germany, Canada, Cuba, Cyprus and Ireland.
