= Ardross, Highland =

Area in Scotland

Coordinates: 57.73°N 4.34°W

Ardross: Scottish Gaelic: Àird Rois
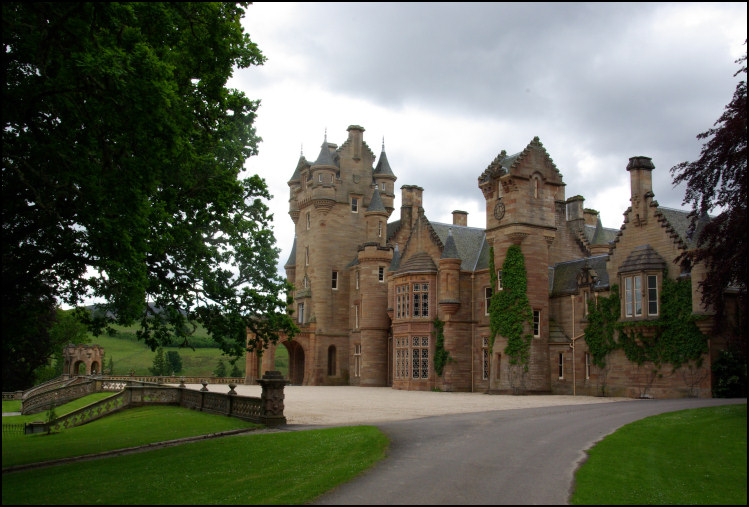
- Ardross Castle

- Location within the Ross and Cromarty area
- Population: 150 (est.)
- OS grid reference: NH6174
- Council area: Highland
- Lieutenancy area: Ross and Cromarty
- Country: Scotland
- Sovereign state: United Kingdom
- Post town: Alness
- Postcode district: IV17
- Dialling code: 01349
- Police: Scotland
- Fire: Scottish
- Ambulance: Scottish
- UK Parliament: Caithness, Sutherland and Easter Ross
- Scottish Parliament: Caithness, Sutherland and Ross

Designations

Inventory of Gardens and Designed Landscapes in Scotland
- Official name: Ardross Castle
- Designated: 30 March 2003
- Reference no.: GDL00023

Ardross (Scottish Gaelic: Àird Rois, 'high-point of [Easter] Ross') is a rural area in the Highland region of Scotland, 30 miles (48 km) north of the nearest city, Inverness. Ardross lies near the B9176, 10 miles (16 km) inland from the east-coast town of Alness and progressively becomes more mountainous to the west and north.

The area is populated by a small rural community mainly confined to the more fertile lower slopes to the east and the glacial glens of Strathrusdale and Strathy. The total area comprises about 30 square miles (78 km^{2}), most of which is lower-slope farming, commercial pine forest on foothills and open mountain to the north and west. The largest concentration of dwellings is in the village of Dublin comprising about 30 houses and a church, so named as it was founded by Irish immigrant workers who built Ardross Castle.

Since 2022, the castle has been used as the filming location for the BBC One reality game show The Traitors, as well as the American edition for the streaming channel Peacock.

== History ==
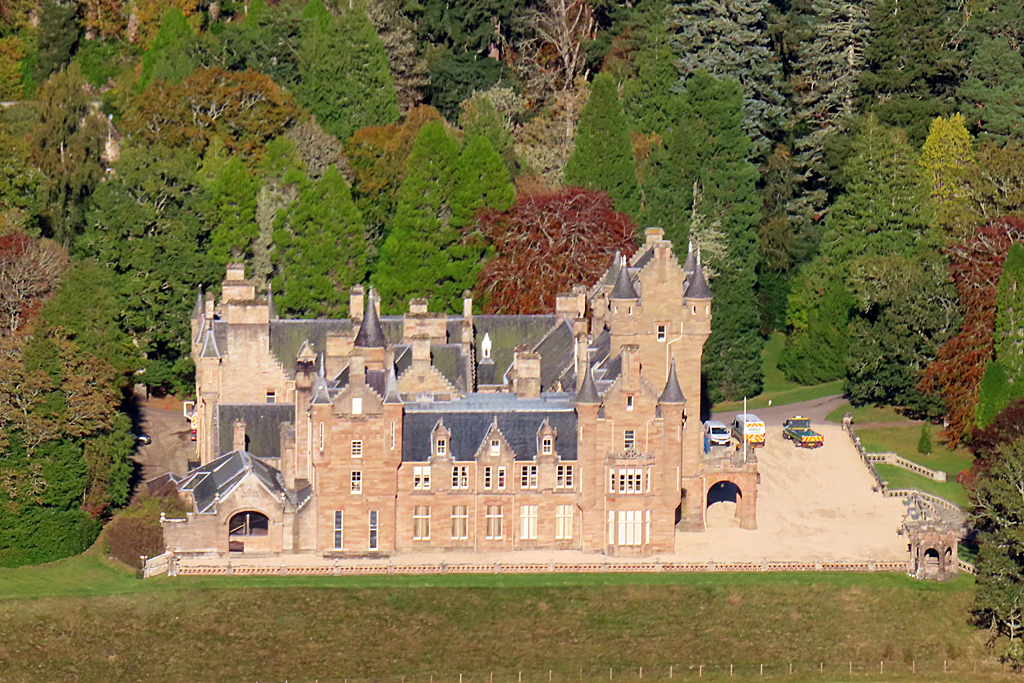
Telephoto aerial view of Ardross Castle

The earliest inhabitants of Ardross were the Picts (6–10th century), and there are still recognisable remains of Pictish roundhouses at various locations in the area. The most notable surviving artefacts of their time in Ardross are two carved stone slabs depicting a wolf and a deer, some of the finest surviving Pictish animal symbols ever discovered, which are now displayed at Inverness Museum. The carvings were recovered from a drystone wall in Stittenham, Ardross in 1891.

The Duke of Sutherland bought the 60,000-acre (24,000 ha) Ardross Estate in the late 18th century, and in 1845, sold it to Sir Alexander Matheson, 1st Baronet, for £90,000.

Matheson improved the estate and placed it under the supervision of factor William MacKenzie, an engineer by profession. By 1875 the number of agricultural tenants had increased fivefold to over 500, with around 1,200 acres (490 ha) of arable land being improved. The architect Alexander Ross was commissioned to re-design Ardross Castle in the Scots Baronial style and following Sir Alexander's death, his son, Sir Kenneth Matheson, sold the estate in 1898 to Charles William Dyson Perrins, a Captain in the Highland Light Infantry, with interests in the Worcester Royal Porcelain Company and Lea & Perrins (Worcester) sauce. The estate was broken up and sold in 1937. Mr and Mrs Austin Mardon purchased Ardross Castle and 80 acres (32 ha) of associated land and lived there until 1983, when the castle and grounds were sold to the McTaggart family, who began a program of restoration work.

From 2022, the castle was used as the filming location for BBC One reality television series The Traitors, and for the subsequent American series for streaming channel Peacock.

Famous people from Ardross include Sir John McKenzie, who emigrated to New Zealand in 1860 and became a prominent politician. He is remembered in New Zealand as the Minister of Lands and Agriculture who developed a policy which disfavored large landowners. This stemmed from his experience in Ardross where he was deeply moved by the misery he witnessed among tenants on Ardross Estate. Some of his near relatives suffered in this way and were forced to emigrate to Canada and the United States. Many years later McKenzie related how, when once walking home with his father, he came upon a number of dispossessed tenant farmers who had been forced to camp in the local cemetery at Ardross Church as there was nowhere else to go. Many years earlier, in 1792, tenants at Strathrusdale, which forms the western area of Ardross, had led a famous revolt against landowners such as the Duke of Sutherland who were carrying out the Highland Clearances.

== Greek Orthodox Chapel of St. John the Baptist ==
The Chapel of St. John the Baptist is a Greek Orthodox chapel within the courtyard of Ardross Castle. The chapel is not publicly visible in media coverage of the castle but plays a significant role in the estate's history and religious function. Originally a Catholic place of worship, the chapel was converted to Greek Orthodox in 1983 following the acquisition of the estate by the McTaggart family.

=== Artistic features ===
The chapel's frescoes were first painted in the early 1990s by Eleftherios Foulidis, a Greek iconographer. His work employed a modern pseudo-Byzantine style, depicting Orthodox saints and biblical scenes in deep, vibrant colors. According to Aidan Hart, a British liturgical artist, the frescoes create an effect he described as evoking the "Narnia cupboard in your soul."

=== Restoration ===
In 2022, Loukas Tsarmaklis, the estate manager, discovered dry rot in one of the guest bathrooms, which required partial dismantling of the walls adjacent to the chapel. This issue was attributed to an undetected leak affecting the chapel's wooden framework. As a result, portions of the frescoes were lost and required restoration.

The restoration was led by teacher of iconography at The King's Foundation Aidan Hart, an artist known for his Byzantine iconography and liturgical work, including commissions for King Charles III such as the Anointing Screen for the Coronation Service of Charles III and Camilla. Hart, along with apprentices Mark Fisher and Sister Josephine Marie, spent three weeks in 2024 meticulously restoring the lost fresco areas. Hart acknowledged the difficulty of seamlessly blending his work with the original style, which he described as "folky" and slightly cruder than his traditional Byzantine technique.

=== Monastery expansion ===
Plans are underway to establish a new Orthodox monastery in the Scottish Highlands. The McTaggart family, owners of the Ardross estate, have gifted land to the Greek Orthodox Archdiocese of Thyateira and Great Britain for this purpose, reflecting their longstanding wish to see an Orthodox monastery in the region. His Eminence Archbishop Nikitas, alongside His Grace Bishop Raphael of Ilion, is leading the project, with support from the McTaggart family who are devout Greek Orthodox Christians and members of St. Andrew's Orthodox Church in Edinburgh.

=== Present-day use ===
The Chapel of St. John the Baptist remains an active place of worship under the jurisdiction of the Archdiocese of Thyateira and Great Britain. While not a widely known feature of Ardross Castle, it serves as a religious and artistic landmark within the Highlands.

== Local area ==
Ardross distillery is a whisky and gin distillery in the area.
