= The Traitors (British TV series) =

British reality television show

- Also known as: The Traitors UK
- Genre: Reality; Game show
- Based on: De Verraders by: Marc Pos; Jasper Hoogendoorn
- Presented by: Claudia Winkleman
- Theme music composer: Sam Watts
- Country of origin: United Kingdom
- Original language: English
- No. of series: 4
- No. of episodes: 48

Production
- Production locations: Ardross, Highland, Scotland
- Camera setup: Multi-camera
- Running time: 60–75 minutes
- Production company: Studio Lambert

Original release
- Network: BBC One
- Release: 29 November 2022 – present

Related
- The Celebrity Traitors; The Traitors US

The Traitors (also known as The Traitors UK) is a British reality television series broadcast on BBC One, based on the Dutch series De Verraders. It was first broadcast on 29 November 2022, and is hosted by Claudia Winkleman.

Following the premise of De Verraders, the show features a group of contestants participating in a social deduction game similar to Mafia or Werewolf, set in and among the grounds of Ardross Castle in Scotland. During the game, a small group of contestants become the titular "Traitors", and work together to eliminate the other contestants to win a grand prize, while the remaining contestants become "Faithful" and are tasked to discover and banish the Traitors by eliminating them to win the grand prize.

Since the show's premiere, it has become a major success for the BBC, with viewing figures reaching eleven million by 2026. It has become one of the most watched British reality game shows of all time. In 2025, a celebrity spin-off titled The Celebrity Traitors debuted.

The British show also serves as a sister show to the American version, with both being produced by Studio Lambert for the BBC and Peacock. They share the same location, props, and missions, with the main difference being the hosts.

== Format ==
The contestants arrive at a castle in the Scottish Highlands where they will spend their entire time for the duration of the game. On the arrival day, host Claudia Winkleman chooses at least three contestants to be called "Traitors" and the rest are automatically called "Faithful". The television audience are shown who have been chosen as Traitors, but the Faithful do not know their number or identity. Should the Faithful contestants eliminate all the Traitors, they will share the prize fund. If a Traitor makes it to the end, they receive the money.

Each night, the Traitors decide one Faithful contestant to "murder", and that person will leave the game immediately. The remaining Faithful contestants will not know who has been eliminated until the following day, when they do not arrive for breakfast.

Each day, the group participates in missions to win money for the prize fund, which can reach up to £120,000 (Note: The highest potential prize was £120,000; however, in contrast to the officially reported figures, the amount stated for the first series was £118,000 according to broadcasts, which subsequently rose to £129,950 in the third series.) by the end of the game. During the missions, any contestant may separately win a shield that awards that player immunity from being murdered, but not from being banished. In some cases, the contestant has the right or ability not to disclose if they won the shield, or to tell a restricted group.

Usually at the end of each day, the group will participate in the Banishment Ceremony, where the players gather at the Round Table to discuss who they want to eliminate or think is a Traitor, before individually voting for a player to banish. Players cast their votes privately, before revealing their vote in turn to everyone. The person obtaining the most votes is banished from the game and must reveal their affiliation. In a tied vote, a run-off vote occurs between those tied with the highest vote tallies. If a second tie occurs, one player is chosen for banishment randomly among the tied players.

If during the game a Traitor is banished, the remaining Traitors may be given the option to "seduce" or recruit a Faithful to join them instead of murdering. Seduced Faithfuls may decline and can decide whether to tell the other Faithfuls of the attempted seduction. If only one Traitor remains, other than on the last episode, the Traitor instead delivers an ultimatum face-to-face with the recruit: if the player declines they are immediately murdered, and if they accept the pair can immediately murder another Faithful.

=== End Game ===
After the final Round Table, the remaining players (typically four) gather at a fire and participate in the End Game. The group are given an opportunity to end the game by unanimous vote. Any vote to continue will lead to another immediate banishment vote. When a unanimous decision is reached to end the game, or when there are only two players left, the remaining players reveal whether they are Faithful or Traitors. If they are all Faithful contestants, they will share the prize fund, however, if any of these final players are Traitors then they will share the prize fund among themselves. To make their choice they give Winkleman one of two pouches: one marked "banish again" and another marked "end game". Each of the pouches is then thrown into a fire where "banish again" pouches cause the flames to turn red and "end game" pouches make them green. All active players see how each player voted.

For series 3, in the final Round Table and for all subsequent banishments around the fire pit, banished players no longer reveal their true affiliation. In addition, the role of "Seer" was introduced, where a player, either Faithful or Traitor, can win the right in a task to meet in private with a player of their choosing who has to reveal their true identity to the Seer (the Seer's true identity is not revealed to the chosen player). Both players can tell the other players whatever they want about the contents of the meeting. In series 3, the Seer's meeting occurred before the final Round Table.

== Production ==
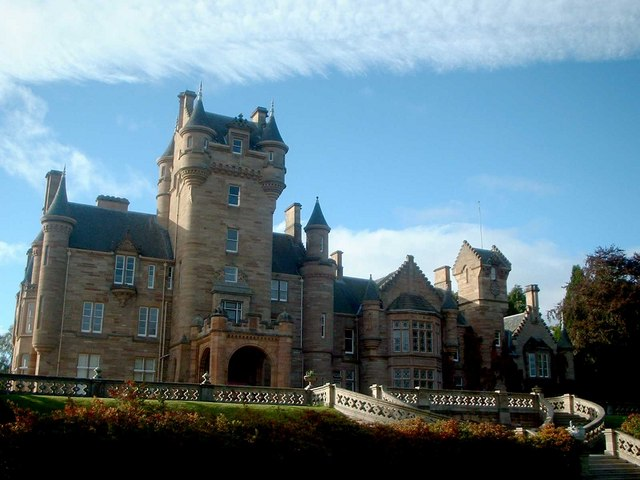
The series was filmed at Ardross Castle (pictured in 2003)

The British show was commissioned by the BBC in October 2021, following the airing of the Dutch series earlier that year. The series is produced by Studio Lambert Scotland.

The first series was recorded in May 2022, at Ardross Castle in Ross-shire, Scotland.

Presenter Claudia Winkleman was initially hesitant to host the programme but after watching the Dutch series became "obsessed" and jokingly said she "booked a train to Scotland".

Applicants would submit a video application and go through several rounds of interviews, as well as a psychological assessment. Contestants were filmed constantly over a long day, learning just before breakfast whether they had been "murdered". "Murdered" contestants immediately leave the castle without the other contestants knowing until they enter breakfast. Contestants were assigned a welfare person to help with their well-being.

On 27 February 2023, the BBC announced that the show had been renewed for a second series, with Winkleman returning to host. In May 2023, Studio Lambert revealed 40,000 people had applied to complete in the second series, in comparison with 1,500 who had applied for series one. On 1 September 2023, it was announced that filming for the second series had begun.

On 3 November 2023, it was revealed that a third series had been commissioned. In January 2024, it was announced that applications for series 3 had begun, with almost 300,000 applications received. The series was filmed in May 2024.

In August 2024, prior to the release of the third series, the BBC announced that the show was renewed for a fourth series, along with the announcement of a celebrity series spin-off. Both versions were filmed during 2025. Applications for the fourth series opened on 22 August 2024 and closed on 9 February 2025.

In March 2026, BBC announced a three-year deal that renews The Traitors and The Celebrity Traitors until 2030.

=== Atmosphere and music ===
The show uses live traditional musicians at moments like dramatic events, missions, and contestant arrivals. These are local to the show's Scottish Highlands setting at Ardross Castle. One example is James Mackenzie from Dingwall, a veteran bagpiper from Ross and Cromarty who performs with the Alness Pipe Band. Known for his mastery of traditional pibroch (classical pipe music), Mackenzie is dressed in traditional Highland attire, including a Mackenzie tartan.

== Episodes ==
=== Series overview ===
Series overview
Series	Contestants	Episodes	Originally released		Winner(s)	Prize	Traitors	Average viewers (millions)
Series	Contestants	Episodes	First released	Last released	Winner(s)	Prize	Traitors	Average viewers (millions)
1	22	12	29 November 2022	22 December 2022	Aaron Evans; Hannah Byczkowski; Meryl Williams (Faithfuls)	£101,050 (out of £118,000)	Alyssa Chan; Amanda Lovett; Wilfred "Wilf" Webster; Kieran Tompsett (from ep. 11)	3.74
2	22	12	3 January 2024	26 January 2024	Harry Clark (Traitor)	£95,150 (out of £120,000)	Ash Bibi; Harry Clark; Paul Gorton; Miles Asteri (from ep. 2); Andrew Jenkins (from ep. 8); Ross Carson (from ep. 9)	6.91
3	25	12	1 January 2025	24 January 2025	Jake Brown; Leanne Quigley (Faithfuls)	£94,600 (out of £129,950)	Armani Gouveia; Linda Rands; Minah Shannon; Charlotte Berman (from ep. 8); Freddie Fraser (from ep. 10)	9.32
4	22	12	1 January 2026	23 January 2026	Rachel Duffy; Stephen Libby (Traitors)	£95,750 (out of £120,000)	Hugo Lodge; Rachel Duffy; Stephen Libby; Fiona Hughes (Secret Traitor)	11.63
5	TBA	12	January 2027	January 2027	TBA	TBA	TBA	TBA

=== Series 1 (2022) ===
No. overall	No. in series	Title	Original release date	UK viewers (millions)
1	1	"Episode 1"	29 November 2022	3.88
2	2	"Episode 2"	30 November 2022	3.14
3	3	"Episode 3"	1 December 2022	<2.71 (Note: This episode did not make it into the top 50 most viewed programmes of the week and therefore full figures are not available.)
4	4	"Episode 4"	6 December 2022	3.33
5	5	"Episode 5"	7 December 2022	3.13
6	6	"Episode 6"	8 December 2022	3.37
7	7	"Episode 7"	13 December 2022	3.76
8	8	"Episode 8"	15 December 2022 (Note: This episode was originally scheduled for the night before, but was delayed due to coverage of the 2022 Qatar World Cup.)	3.75
9	9	"Episode 9"	16 December 2022	3.60
10	10	"Episode 10"	20 December 2022	4.09
11	11	"Episode 11"	21 December 2022	4.32
12	12	"Episode 12"	22 December 2022	4.73

=== Series 2 (2024) ===
No. overall	No. in series	Title	Original release date	UK viewers (millions)
13	1	"Episode 1"	3 January 2024	6.22
14	2	"Episode 2"	4 January 2024 (Note: This episode was released on BBC iPlayer on 3 January 2024.)	5.91
15	3	"Episode 3"	5 January 2024	5.94
16	4	"Episode 4"	10 January 2024	6.54
17	5	"Episode 5"	11 January 2024	6.56
18	6	"Episode 6"	12 January 2024	6.70
19	7	"Episode 7"	17 January 2024	7.17
20	8	"Episode 8"	18 January 2024	7.16
21	9	"Episode 9"	19 January 2024	7.24
22	10	"Episode 10"	24 January 2024	7.56
23	11	"Episode 11"	25 January 2024	7.71
24	12	"Episode 12"	26 January 2024	8.16

=== Series 3 (2025) ===
No. overall	No. in series	Title	Original release date	UK viewers (millions)
25	1	"Episode 1"	1 January 2025	9.44
26	2	"Episode 2"	2 January 2025 (Note: This episode was released on BBC iPlayer on 1 January 2025.)	8.74
27	3	"Episode 3"	3 January 2025	8.81
28	4	"Episode 4"	8 January 2025	9.20
29	5	"Episode 5"	9 January 2025	9.17
30	6	"Episode 6"	10 January 2025	9.21
31	7	"Episode 7"	15 January 2025	9.37
32	8	"Episode 8"	16 January 2025	9.47
33	9	"Episode 9"	17 January 2025	9.40
34	10	"Episode 10"	22 January 2025	9.46
35	11	"Episode 11"	23 January 2025	9.63
36	12	"The Final"	24 January 2025	9.98

=== Series 4 (2026) ===
No. overall	No. in series	Title	Original release date	UK viewers (millions)
37	1	"Episode 1"	1 January 2026	11.85
38	2	"Episode 2"	2 January 2026	11.04
39	3	"Episode 3"	3 January 2026	11.20
40	4	"Episode 4"	7 January 2026	11.74
41	5	"Episode 5"	8 January 2026	11.51
42	6	"Episode 6"	9 January 2026	11.99
43	7	"Episode 7"	14 January 2026	11.58
44	8	"Episode 8"	15 January 2026	11.62
45	9	"Episode 9"	16 January 2026	11.76
46	10	"Episode 10"	21 January 2026	11.61
47	11	"Episode 11"	22 January 2026	11.67
48	12	"The Final"	23 January 2026	11.94

== Reception ==
=== Critical reception ===
The series was generally well received by critics, who praised the programme for being "fresh, yet familiar", comparing it to party games such as Mafia or wink murder. Rebecca Nicholson of The Guardian says the format "feels like a revival of the early, more innocent days of reality TV", calling it "The White Lotus meets Big Brother 1". The Tab believed that social media helped the success of the show: "The memes and everyone live-tweeting it has played a big part in its success. Nobody wants to miss out on a reality TV show that everyone is talking about." Isobel Lewis of The Independent was more critical, however, saying it "definitely isn't a perfect reality show, or even the best in its genre right now, but it is pretty entertaining."

=== Viewership ===
By early 2024, the series had an average audience of 5.4 million, with a peak of 6.2 million for the first episode of series two. By the end of February 2023, The Traitors had been viewed over 34 million times on BBC iPlayer.

The BBC stated that The Traitors was the most-watched new series for young audiences across all BBC content in 2022, with a 1.3 million average audience across the series and a peak of 1.5 million for the final.

The Traitors : UK viewers per episode (millions)

Series	Episode number												Average
Series	1	2	3	4	5	6	7	8	9	10	11	12	Average
1	3.88	3.14	N/A	3.33	3.13	3.37	3.76	3.75	3.60	4.09	4.32	4.73	3.74
2	6.22	5.91	5.94	6.54	6.56	6.70	7.17	7.16	7.24	7.56	7.71	8.16	6.91
3	9.44	8.74	8.81	9.20	9.17	9.21	9.37	9.47	9.40	9.46	9.63	9.98	9.32
4	11.85	11.04	11.20	11.74	11.51	11.99	11.58	11.62	11.76	11.61	11.67	11.94	11.63

Audience measurement performed by Broadcasters' Audience Research Board

=== Awards and nominations ===
Year	Award	Category	Nominee(s)	Result	Ref.
2023	28th National Television Awards	Reality Competition	The Traitors	Won	
2023	Edinburgh International Television Festival	Best Entertainment	The Traitors	Won	
2023	2023 TV Times Awards	Best Presenter	Claudia Winkleman	Nominated	
2023	2023 TV Times Awards	Best Entertainment Show	The Traitors	Won	
2023	2023 TV Times Awards	Favourite TV Moment	Wilf Webster revealed as a traitor	Nominated	
2023	British Academy Television Awards	Best Reality and Constructed Factual	The Traitors	Won	
2023	British Academy Television Awards	Best Entertainment Performance	Claudia Winkleman	Won	
2023	British Academy Television Awards	Memorable Moment	The Traitors: The final roundtable	Nominated	
2023	Royal Television Society Programme Awards	Entertainment	The Traitors	Won	
2023	Royal Television Society Programme Awards	Entertainment Performance	Claudia Winkleman	Won	
2024	2024 TV Choice Awards	Best Reality Show	The Traitors	Nominated	
2024	29th National Television Awards	Reality Competition	The Traitors	Won	
2024	Televisual Bulldog Awards	Entertainment	The Traitors	Won	
2025	30th National Television Awards	Reality Competition	The Traitors	Nominated	
2025	30th National Television Awards	Best TV Presenter	Claudia Winkleman (for The Traitors and Strictly Come Dancing)	Nominated	

== The Traitors: Uncloaked ==
The Traitors: Uncloaked
- Also known as: Uncloaked
- Presented by: Ed Gamble
- Theme music composer: Sam Watts
- Country of origin: United Kingdom
- Original language: English
- No. of series: 4
- No. of episodes: 24

Production
- Producer: Listen
- Camera setup: Multi-camera
- Running time: 29 minutes
- Production company: Studio Lambert

Original release
- Network: BBC Two
- Release: 5 January 2024 – 1 January 2026
- Network: BBC One
- Release: 2 January 2026 – present

To accompany the second series in January 2024, a spin-off television programme and BBC Sounds podcast was introduced, called The Traitors: Uncloaked produced by Listen. The first episode aired on 5 January 2024. It was hosted by Ed Gamble and broadcast on BBC Two. The final episode of Uncloaked which aired on BBC Two immediately after the series two finale received 3.97 million viewers. Uncloaked returned with the same format to accompany the third series in 2025. For the fourth series in 2026, episodes from 2 January onwards the show were moved to BBC One.

== The Traitors at the Proms ==
On 26 July 2025, Winkleman presented a BBC Proms concert at London's Royal Albert Hall with music from the BBC Scottish Symphony Orchestra, BBC Symphony Chorus and the BBC Singers directed by Irish conductor Karen Ní Bhroin. Inspired by the show's tense and haunting soundtrack, the Prom featured melodramatic versions of pop tunes heard in the series, including Britney Spears's "Toxic", Olivia Rodrigo's "Vampire", and Billie Eilish's "Bad Guy", all given a signature gothic, symphonic twist performed alongside guest vocalists Andrea Lykke Oehlenschlæger, Hayla and Darrell Smith. The matinee performance of the Prom was broadcast live on BBC Radio 3 and repeated on BBC Radio 2 on 24 August; highlights were later shown on 1 January 2026, on BBC One.

== Interactive merchandise ==
After the first series, the BBC published a Traitors card game and puzzle book. In September 2023, a board game, called The Traitors, was released.

For series 2, a Traitors app was released, allowing users to predict what would happen in the series and gain points for correct predictions. It was described as "the perfect synchronicity between programme content and interactive platform".

== International broadcast ==
In Australia, the series became available to stream on 10 Play in March 2023, as a companion to the Australian version aired by the network. The first celebrity edition aired fast-tracked on 10Play and also aired on linear television on Network 10 on a two-week delay, while the second aired on liner on a five-day delay.

In the United States, the show is available to stream on Peacock, the broadcaster of the American version.

In Canada, the show is available to stream on Crave. The Canadian version of the series premiered on 2 October 2023, on CTV.

In New Zealand, the show is available to stream on ThreeNow, the same broadcaster as the New Zealand version.

In Sweden, the first series was available with Swedish subtitles on TV4 Play shortly after the premiere of Förrädarna, TV4's localized version. Many other countries have followed the same route.

In Poland, the first series was broadcast on TVN 7 in nighttime slot in December 2024, and each episode was available to watch on the streaming service Player after it aired on TVN 7.

The Croatian network RTL, which broadcasts the Croatian edition of the series, began releasing The Traitors UK on its streaming service Voyo on 1 January 2025.

In Ireland, the first series was added to the RTÉ Player in the beginning of July 2025, before the series began airing on RTÉ2 with RTÉ's own version of the show premiering in late August.

== See also ==
Other versions

- The Traitors Australia
- The Traitors Canada
- The Traitors Ireland
- The Traitors NZ
- The Traitors US
- The Traitors India

Similar shows

- Killer Camp
- Million Dollar Secret
- The Mole
- Nobody's Fool
- Trapped!
- Survivor
