= List of The Celebrity Traitors contestants =

The Celebrity Traitors is a spin-off of the British version of the reality television series The Traitors. It was first broadcast on BBC One on 8 October 2025. Claudia Winkleman presents the series.

Following the premise of the parent series, the show features a group of celebrity contestants participating in a social deduction game similar to Mafia or Werewolf, set in and around Ardross Castle in Scotland. A small group of contestants are chosen as the titular "Traitors" and must work together to eliminate the other contestants to win a grand prize. The remaining contestants are the "Faithful" and are tasked to discover and banish the Traitors by voting them out to win the grand prize. The grand prize is awarded to a charity of the winner's choice.

== Contestants ==
Winners of The Celebrity Traitors

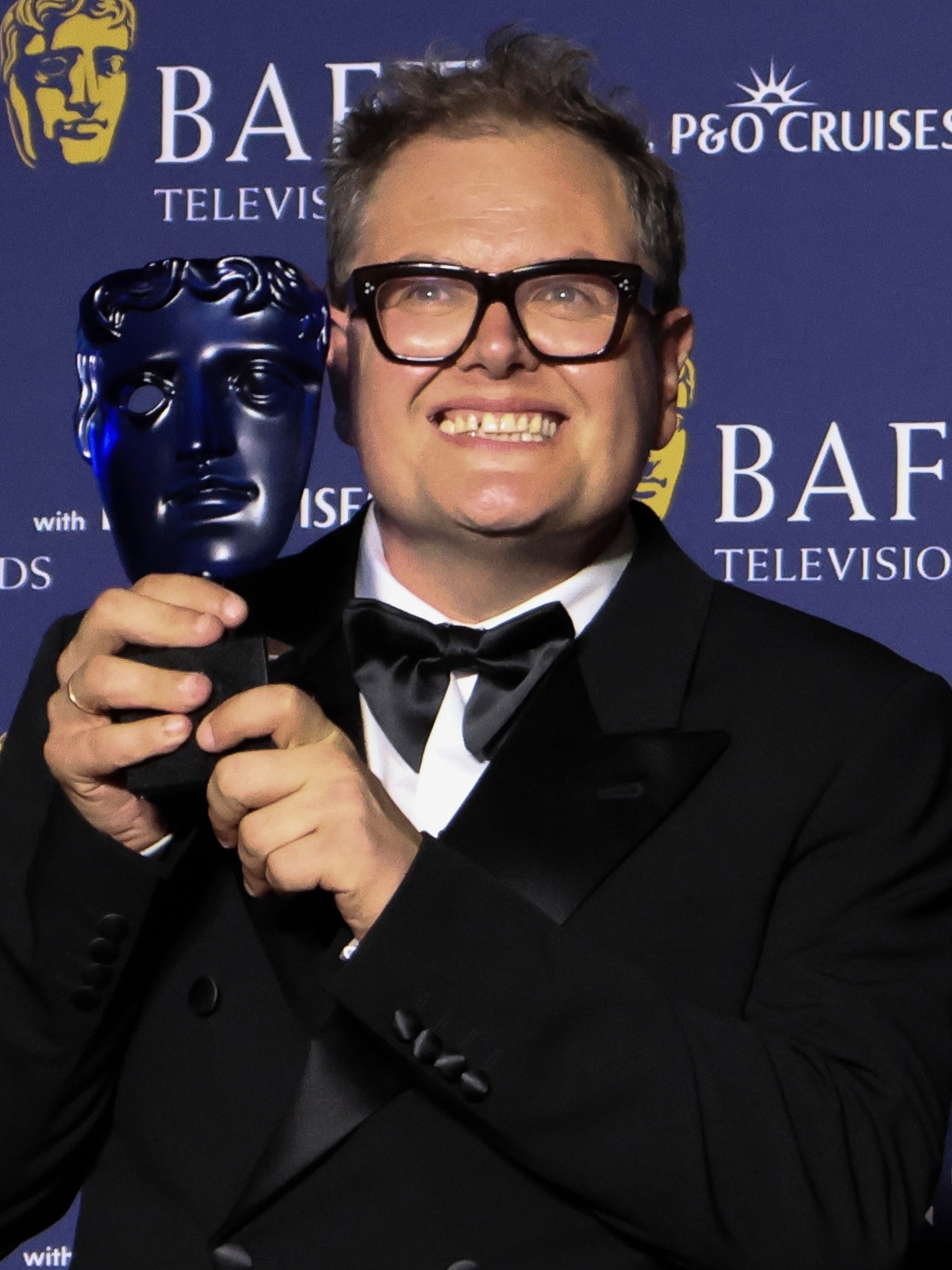
Alan Carr (S1)

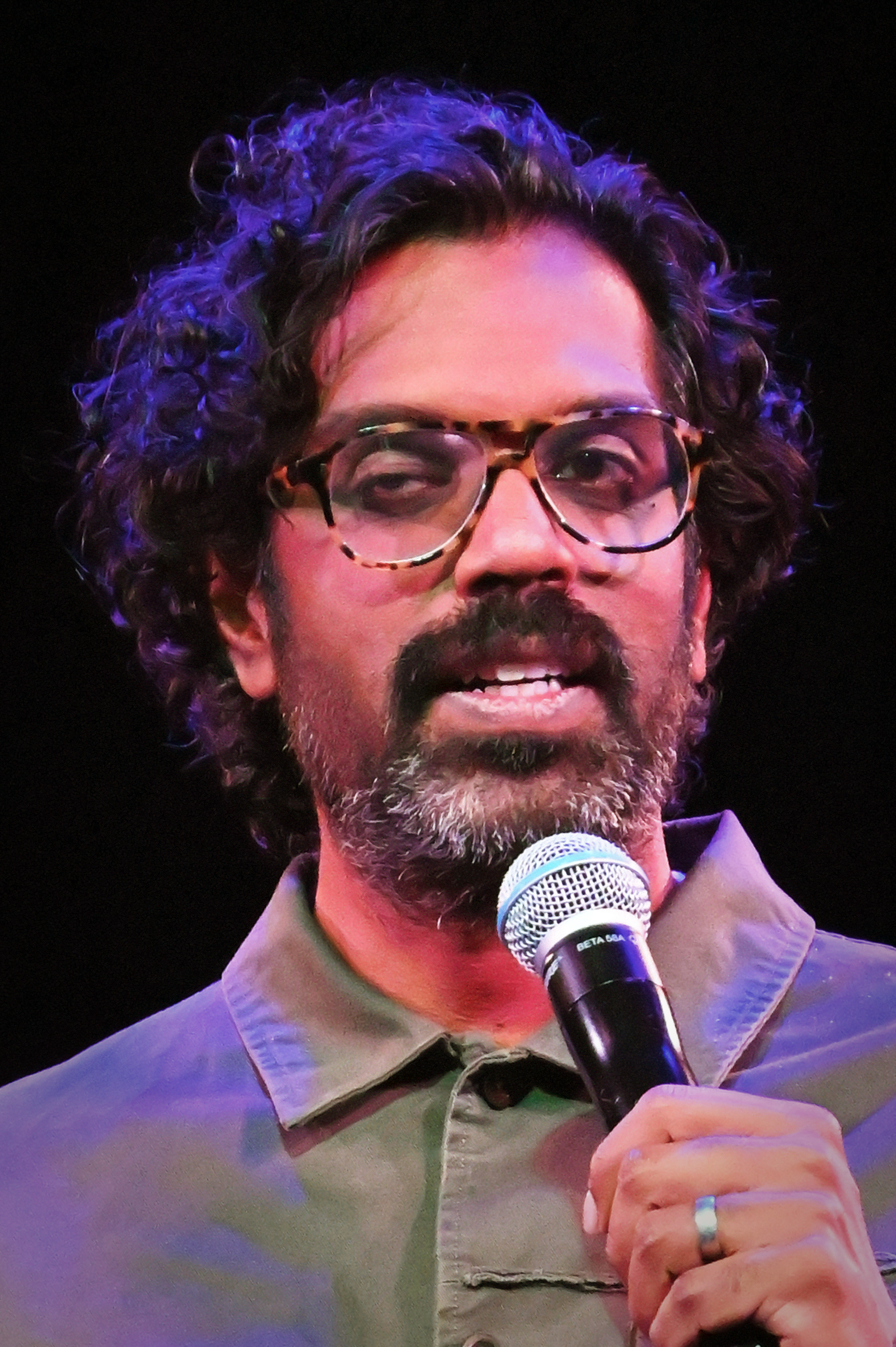
Romesh Ranganathan (S2)

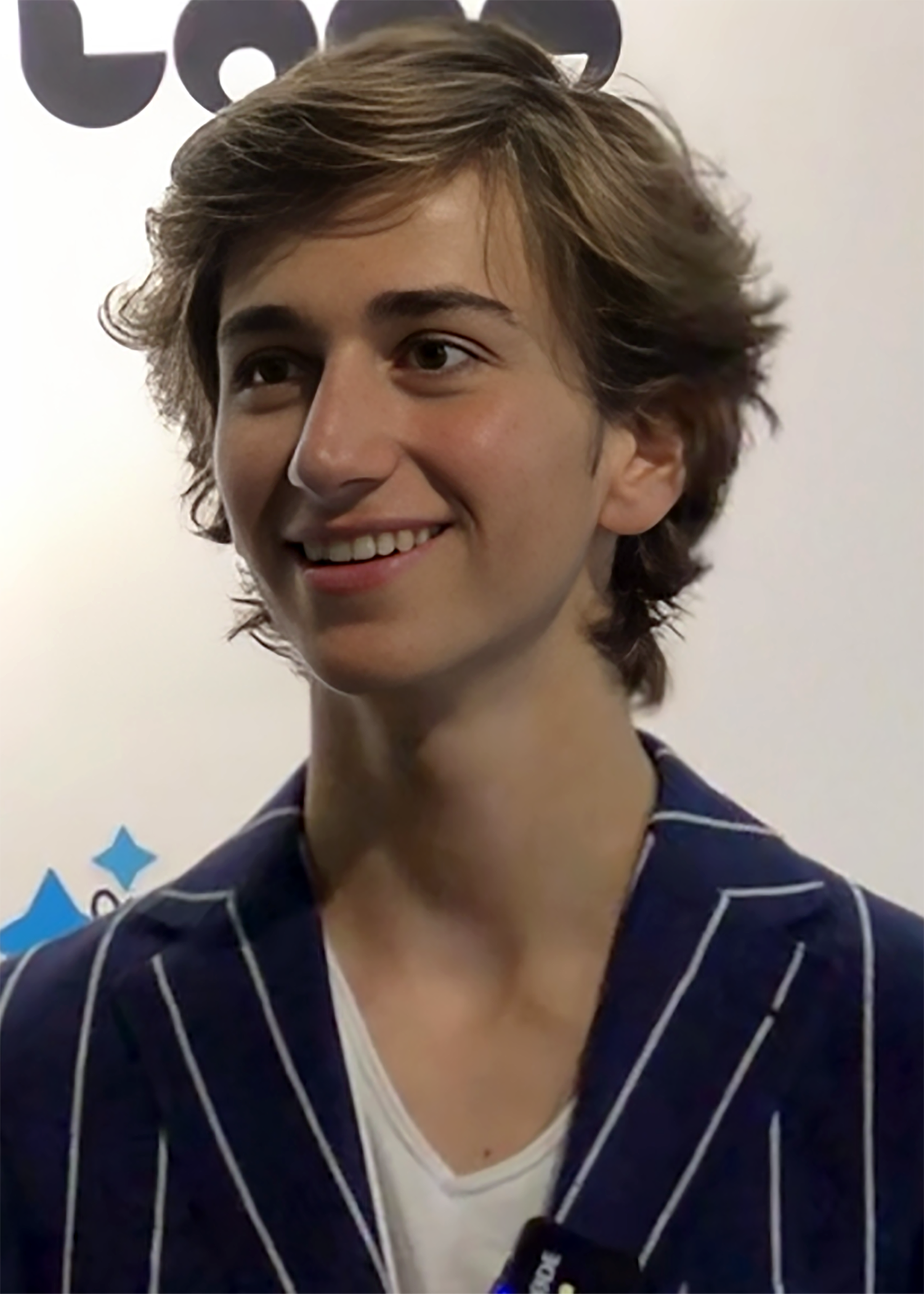
Sebastian Croft (S2)

As of series 2, forty celebrities have competed, eight of whom served as Traitors. The Faithfuls have won once and the Traitors have won once.

Key
Winner
Runner-up
Faithful
Traitor
Banished
Murdered
Participating

List of The Celebrity Traitors contestants
Series	Contestant	Age (Note: As shown on screen.)	Notability	Chosen charity	Affiliation	Status	Finish
1	Paloma Faith	44	Singer-songwriter & actress	Save the Children	Faithful	Murdered	19th
1	Niko Omilana	27	Content creator	Under One Sky	Faithful	Banished	18th
1	Tom Daley	31	Olympian & entrepreneur	The Brain Tumour Charity	Faithful	Murdered	17th
1	Tameka Empson	48	Actress, comedian & writer	Parkinson's UK	Faithful	Banished	16th
1	Ruth Codd	29	Actress	Almost Home Animal Rescue NI	Faithful	Murdered	15th
1	Clare Balding	54	Broadcaster & author	Cancer Research UK	Faithful	Banished	14th
1	Charlotte Church	39	Singer & activist	The Awen Project	Faithful	Murdered	13th
1	Mark Bonnar	56	Actor	Action for ME	Faithful	Banished	12th
1	Joe Wilkinson	50	Comedian	Wolo Foundation	Faithful	Murdered	11th
1	Stephen Fry	68	Actor, writer & presenter	Mind	Faithful	Banished	10th
1	Lucy Beaumont	42	Comedian	Zoe's Place	Faithful	Murdered	9th
1	Jonathan Ross	64	Presenter	Cancer Research UK	Traitor	Banished	8th
1	Celia Imrie	73	Actress	Beat	Faithful	Murdered	7th
1	Kate Garraway	58	Broadcaster	Carers First	Faithful	Banished	6th
1	Cat Burns	25	Singer-songwriter	National Autistic Society	Traitor	Banished	5th
1	Joe Marler	35	Former England rugby player	CALM	Faithful	Banished	4th
1	David Olusoga	55	Historian & film-maker	Bristol Dog Action Welfare Group; Greyhound & Lurcher Rescue	Faithful	Runner-up	2nd
1	Nick Mohammed	45	Actor & comedian	Blood Cancer UK	Faithful	Runner-up	2nd
1	Alan Carr	49	Comedian	Neuroblastoma UK	Traitor	Winner	1st
2	Amol Rajan	43	Journalist & broadcaster	The Louis Dundas Centre of Great Ormond Street Hospital	Faithful	Murdered	21st
2	Richard E. Grant	69	Actor & author	Longfield Community Hospice	Traitor	Banished	20th
2	Myha'la	30	Actor	Food Foundation	Faithful	Banished	19th
2	Bella Ramsey	23	Actor	Bamboozle Theatre Company	Faithful	Murdered	18th
2	Julie Hesmondhalgh	56	Actor	Reuben's Retreat	Faithful	Banished	17th
2	Rob Beckett	40	Comedian	Matt Palmer Trust	Faithful	Murdered	16th
2	Hannah Fry	42	Broadcaster & mathematician	Alzheimer's Society	Traitor (Note: Hannah Fry was recruited as a Traitor in Episode 3 of Series 2.)	Banished	15th
2	Joe Lycett	38	Comedian	Tamworth Wellbeing and Cancer Support Centre	Faithful	Banished	14th
2	Ross Kemp	62	Actor & presenter	Haemophilia Society	Faithful	Murdered	13th
2	Jerry Hall	70	Model & actor	King's Trust	Faithful	Banished	12th
2	Miranda Hart	53	Actor & author	Astriid	Faithful	Murdered	11th
2	Joanne McNally	43	Comedian	UNICEF	Faithful	Banished	10th
2	Sharon Rooney	37	Actor	Robin House Children's Hospice	Faithful	Murdered	9th
2	James Acaster	41	Comedian & podcaster	Friends of the Earth Charitable Trust	Traitor (Note: James Acaster was recruited as a Traitor in Episode 2 of Series 2.)	Banished	8th
2	Michael Sheen	57	Actor & presenter	Tŷ Hafan	Faithful	Murdered	7th
2	Maya Jama	32	Broadcaster & entrepreneur	Action for Children	Traitor	Banished	6th
2	Leigh-Anne Pinnock	34	Singer-songwriter	British Red Cross Society	Faithful	Banished	5th
2	King Kenny	29	Content creator	Rethink Mental Illness	Traitor (Note: King Kenny was recruited as a Traitor in Episode 5 of Series 2.)	Banished	4th
2	James Blunt	52	Singer-songwriter	Blue Marine Foundation	Faithful	Banished	3rd
2	Romesh Ranganathan	48	Comedian	Refugee Council	Faithful	Winner	1st
2	Sebastian Croft	24	Musician & actor	Choose Love	Faithful	Winner	1st
