= Responsible Reform =

2012 UK disability benefit report

Responsible Reform, also known as the Spartacus Report, is a report published on 9 January 2012 that analyses the United Kingdom coalition government's proposed welfare benefit changes in the Welfare Reform Bill 2011 that proposes the replacement of the Disability Living Allowance (DLA) with Personal Independence Payments (PIP).

The report was written, researched, funded and supported by multiple individuals who collaborated via social media, and gathers together existing information and analyses over 500 group responses to the UK Government's response to Disability Living Allowance reform, which were obtained via a freedom of information request.

== Claims ==
The report claims that the Government's response to the DLA consultation presented a highly misleading view of the responses it received, and that the consultation process did not meet the Government's own Codes of Practice.

It also notes that the evidence of the consultation did not support the Governments claim of a 30% rise in DLA claims relevant to PIP, rather that the figure is actually 13%, and that these figures were not made clear to parliamentarians as they debated the bill, despite a Government report being signed off in May 2011.

== Response ==
The report has been widely circulated on the social networking service Twitter using the hashtag #spartacusreport. On the date of publication it became a trending topic and has received backing from thousands of users including Stephen Fry, John Prescott, Alastair Campbell, Billy Bragg, Val McDermid, Kate Long, Julie Hesmondhalgh, Sue Perkins and Tim Minchin, as well as various groups including Disability Rights UK, which represents over 350 groups, and Scope, Mind, RNIB, Sense, National Autistic Society, Action for ME and the Papworth Trust.

On Monday 9 January, the Department for Work and Pensions press office also responded to the issue on Twitter.

On Wednesday 11 January, the House of Lords voted against three clauses in the bill relating to disabled children, cancer patients, and the time limiting of employment support allowance.

On Thursday 12 January, disability rights blogger and architect of the report, Sue Marsh, was interviewed on the BBC's current affairs programme Newsnight alongside employment minister Chris Grayling.

On Tuesday 17 January, an amendment to hold an independent review of the Welfare Reform Bill was defeated in the House of Lords by 229 votes to 213.
