= Ardross =

Ardross may refer to:

- Ardross, Western Australia
- Ardross, Highland, Scotland
- Ardross (horse), Thoroughbred race horse
- SS Ardross, a Hong Kong steamship in service 1961-63

== See also ==
- Ardross Castle (disambiguation)
