= Irish Blood =

2025 television series

- Genre: Drama
- Screenplay by: Aaron Martin; Christina Ray; Mike O’Leary; John Krizanc
- Directed by: Molly McGlynn
- Starring: Alicia Silverstone
- Countries of origin: United States; Ireland; Canada
- Original language: English
- No. of series: 1
- No. of episodes: 6

Production
- Executive producers: Christina Jennings; Scott Garvie; Paul Donovan; Ailish McElmeel; Aaron Martin; Christina Ray; Alicia Silverstone; Molly McGlynn; Paul Lutz
- Producers: Paige Haight; Catherine McGee
- Production companies: Shaftesbury Films; Deadpan Pictures; AMC Studios

Original release
- Network: Acorn TV
- Release: 11 August 2025 – present

Irish Blood is a 2025 television series starring Alicia Silverstone that premiered on 11 August 2025 on Acorn TV. In September 2025, the series was renewed for a second season.

== Premise ==
An American lawyer travels to Ireland to learn about why her estranged father abandoned her as a child. She receives a suspicious message from her father which leads her to fly over to confront him. Upon her arrival at her father's office in Co. Wicklow, she finds that he has passed away and is left to uncover the truths about his shady business dealings and the circumstances of his death.

== Cast and characters ==
- Alicia Silverstone as Fiona Fox
- Jason O'Mara as Declan Murphy
- Wendy Crewson as Mary
- Dearbhla Molloy as Isidora Murphy
- Simone Kirby as Una Murphy
- Ruth Codd as Garda Róisín Doherty
- Gavin O'Connor as Sergeant Claude
- Barry John Kinsella as Leo Travers
- Djouliet Amara as Tess
- Leonardo Taiwo as Musa
- Pom Boyd as Minerva Quilligan
- Vincent Walsh as Johnny McIntyre
- Faith Delaney as Young Fiona

== Episodes ==
No.	Title	Directed by	Written by	Original release date
1	"Briefcase"	Molly McGlynn	Christina Ray	August 11, 2025
2	"Horseshoe"	Molly McGlynn	Christina Ray	August 11, 2025
3	"Under Wraps"	Molly McGlynn	Christina Ray	August 18, 2025
4	"Father Al"	Molly McGlynn	Mike O'Leary & Christina Ray & John Krizanc	August 25, 2025
5	"Adding Machine"	Molly McGlynn	Aaron Martin & Mike O'Leary	September 1, 2025
6	"Turboclash"	Molly McGlynn	Christina Ray	September 8, 2025

== Production ==
The series is written by Aaron Martin, Christina Ray, Mike O’Leary, and John Krizanc, and directed by Molly McGlynn, with Paige Haight and Catherine McGee as producers. Christina Jennings, Scott Garvie, Paul Donovan, Ailish McElmeel, Alicia Silverstone, as well as Martin, Ray, and McGlynn are executive producers. The series is from Shaftesbury Films and Deadpan Pictures, in association with AMC Studios.

Silverstone also leads the cast, which includes Jason O'Mara as her father, as well as Wendy Crewson, Dearbhla Molloy, Simone Kirby, Ruth Codd and Leonardo Taiwo.

Filming took place in the Republic of Ireland, including Dublin and County Wicklow, as well as the Causeway coast in Northern Ireland.

In September 2025, the series was renewed for a second season.

== Broadcast ==
Irish Blood aired on 11 August 2025 on Acorn TV in the US. It aired in the UK and Ireland on Sky Witness on 14 December 2025. It aired on Stan in Australia on 11 December 2025.

== DVD release ==
Irish Blood: Series One was released on DVD in the United States (Region 1) on 9 December 2025, in the UK (Region 2) on 12 January 2026, and in Australia (Region 4) on 22 April 2026.
