= The Traitors: Acts of Betrayal =

2027 play cycle by John Finnemore

- Poster for the West End production
- Original language: English
- Written by: John Finnemore
- Based on: The Traitors TV series

Premiere
- Date: 11 May 2027
- Place: Gillian Lynne Theatre, London
- Directed by: Robert Hastie
- https://www.thetraitorsonstage.com/

The Traitors: Acts of Betrayal is an upcoming play cycle by John Finnemore based on the TV reality gameshow The Traitors. Directed by Robert Hastie it is expected to make its world premiere performance in May 2027, at the West End's Gillian Lynne Theatre.

== Development ==
On 26 January 2026, it was announced that a stage version of the reality TV show The Traitors produced by Studio Lambert (who produce the TV show) and Neal Street Productions would open in London's West End in 2027. It was announced that John Finnemore would write the show with Robert Hastie to direct the production.

== Production ==
On 16 June 2026, it was announced that the adaptation would be presented as 5 play cycle, each play beginning the same whilst unfolding in different ways based on which characters are chosen as Traitors with different endings. The plays will make their world premiere at the Gillian Lynne Theatre in London's West End beginning previews on 11 May 2027, booking until 31 July 2027. Each of the 5 plays will be performed on each day from Monday to Friday, with an audience vote determining which play is performed on Saturdays.

On 10 September 2026, Nick Mohammed was announced to play The Host.
