= Ruth Codd =

Irish actress (born 1996)

- Born: 13 June 1996 (age 30); Wexford, Ireland
- Occupation: Actress
- Years active: 2019–present

Ruth Codd (born 13 June 1996) is an Irish actress. She is best known for starring as Anya in Netflix mystery thriller series The Midnight Club (2022) and Juno Usher in the Netflix horror miniseries The Fall of the House of Usher (2023).

== Early life ==
Codd is from Wexford, Ireland. When she was 15, she seriously injured her foot playing football.

== Career ==
Codd was a professional make-up artist and barber prior to the COVID-19 pandemic. After losing her job as a barber, she began posting videos on TikTok. Within a year, she had more than 672,000 followers and 20.5 million likes. Her TikTok content began with comedic nun videos, but later focused on disability awareness.

Codd was discovered by the casting team of the Netflix mystery thriller series The Midnight Club through TikTok, though she deleted her account after being cast in the show. She had no professional acting experience prior to being cast as Anya. The series premiered in October 2022 and garnered positive reviews from critics.

Mike Flanagan, co-creator and showrunner of The Midnight Club, cast Codd to star as Juno Usher in his next Netflix horror miniseries, The Fall of the House of Usher, which was released in October 2023 to critical acclaim. Also in 2023, she guest starred as Cassandra in the "Twenty Minutes with Cassandra" episode of the Shudder anthology horror series Creepshow.

In January 2024, Codd appeared as a contestant on the British cooking competition series Celeb Cooking School, finishing in third place. In March 2024, she had a recurring guest role as Bibi in the Irish comedy-drama series The Dry. That same month, Codd was cast as Phlegma in the action fantasy film How to Train Your Dragon, making her feature film debut.

In May 2025, Codd was announced as a contestant on the first series of The Celebrity Traitors. Codd was selected as a Faithful but was ultimately the third player to be "murdered" by Traitors Alan Carr, Jonathan Ross and Cat Burns in the fourth episode.

== Personal life ==
At the age of 23, Codd elected to have her right leg amputated below the knee due to complications from her previous foot injury. She had the left leg amputated, also below the knee, in November 2025.

== Filmography ==
=== Film ===
Year	Title	Role	Notes	Ref.
2025	How to Train Your Dragon	Phlegma		

=== Television ===
Year	Title	Role	Notes	Ref.
2022	The Midnight Club	Anya	10 episodes	
2023	Creepshow	Cassandra	Episode: "Twenty Minutes with Cassandra"	
2023	The Fall of the House of Usher	Juno Usher	Main role	
2024	Celeb Cooking School	Herself	Season 2 contestant	
2024	The Dry	Bibi	3 episodes	
2025	Small Town, Big Story	Production Peggy	4 episodes	
2025	The Celebrity Traitors	Herself	Contestant; series 1	
2025	Irish Blood	Garda Róisín Doherty	Main role	
2026	Carrie	Cara	2 episodes	
