= Maggie Moore(s) =

2023 American film by John Slattery

- Theatrical release poster
- Directed by: John Slattery
- Written by: Paul Bernbaum
- Produced by: John Slattery; Vincent Newman; Dan Reardon; Santosh Govindaraju; Nancy Leopardi; Ross Kohn
- Starring: Jon Hamm; Tina Fey; Nick Mohammed
- Cinematography: W. Mott Hupfel III
- Edited by: Tom McArdle
- Music by: Ben Sollee
- Production companies: Chicken Soup for the Soul; Redbox Entertainment; Contentious Media; Convergent Media; Aperture Media Partners; V N Entertainment; Shoestring Pictures; Indy Entertainment
- Distributed by: Screen Media
- Release dates: June 2023 (Tribeca); June 16, 2023 (United States)
- Running time: 99 minutes
- Country: United States
- Language: English

Maggie Moore(s) is a 2023 American black comedy mystery film directed by John Slattery and written by Paul Bernbaum. It stars Jon Hamm, Nick Mohammed and Tina Fey. The film is loosely based on the real-life murders of Mary Lou Morris and Mary McGinnis Morris in October 2000 in Houston, Texas.

== Plot ==
Jay Moore's wife Maggie catches him with child sexual abuse material in an envelope he had gotten for Tommy T. Although he claims to only be couriering the pictures for Tommy T, and not indulging in them as he had only just discovered them himself, she says that still counts as an accessory to the crime, and he pleads with her to not go to the cops. Jay then confides his predicament to Tommy T, who advises Jay to consult with a mute hitman called Kosco. Jay tells Kosco that his wife is threatening to go to the cops, and asks him to scare her. Jay buys a lottery ticket in his wife's name, and learns that there are two Maggie Moores in the system.

Maggie 1 tells her neighbour Rita that she is divorcing her husband. When she gets into her car, Kosco suddenly appears from the back seat and points a gun at her. Soon thereafter, the cops get a call about a burning smell and are asked to check it out. They discover that it's a car with a burnt skeleton on the front seat. Since an accelerant was used, Sherriff Sanders and Deputy Reddy deduce that it must be murder. The car is registered to a Maggie Moore, and Rita tells Sanders that Maggie fought a lot with her husband Jay.

Sanders sees Jay at his store and informs him about his wife's death. Jay visits Kosco to ask why he killed his wife instead of scaring her, and Kosco replies that it was because she fought him. Jay then asks Kosco to kill the other Maggie Moore (2), to make it look like the first murder was a case of mistaken identity.

Rita and Sanders go on a date, and she tells him that Jay missed a part of his wife's funeral because he was talking to another man. She remembers that this man was driving a truck for Liberty Bell foods. Sanders realizes that it must be Tommy T, who reveals that Jay bought expired food and sold it to his restaurant customers illegally, contravening his franchise agreement.

Kosco meanwhile kills Maggie 2, and grabs her insulin kit with her initials on it. Sanders gets a call about two dead Maggie Moores just one week apart. Sanders and Reddy think Jay and Tommy are off the hook, since they have alibis. The Maggie 2's husband Andy tells the cops the killer was likely Duane Rich, a coworker who used to bully her with anti-Jewish jibes. When confronted by the cops, Duane admits he was an alcoholic who has since recovered from his old habits and had a thing for the Maggie 2, however he has now seen the error of his ways, was never anti-semitic, and now he even hosts AA meetings at his home.

Sanders and Rita go to a Casino, and get a room for the night. Sanders is however unable to perform, because of feelings of guilt due to losing his wife. They watch the TV news, where a woman called Cassie tells reporters that she had had an affair with Andy Moore, and that his wife had life insurance worth $700K. Andy is also interviewed on TV, and mentions Duane Rich. Jay, also watching the news, gets an idea to have Duane killed and make it look like a suicide, for which he once again hires Kosco. Jay tells Rita things are turning around, and that Duane Rich is probably responsible for both the murders.

Cassie provides the cops with a list of motels where she spent time with Andy. The cops confront Andy with new evidence about his affair with Cassie which he now admits, but denies everything else. Kosco kills Duane at his residence, and when the Police arrive, Duane is found hanging from the ceiling with a suicide note containing a confession to both Maggie Moore murders. However, Sanders has his doubts - why kill Maggie 1 when Duane already knows Maggie 2? The cops learn that Maggie 2 was diabetic and has insulin in her system, but her insulin kit is missing. Andy also confirms that his wife never left home without her kit.

Jay's assistant Greg sees a smashed phone belonging to Jay and mails it to the cops, who aggressively question Tommy T about certain texts on the phone, and he tells them about Kosco. When Sanders and Reddy pay Kosco a visit, he speaks fluently and claims he is Don Lindowski, and that an intruder had lived in his home for several days without his knowledge. While leaving, Sanders whispers to Reddy that this must be the murderer, since the insulin kit with Maggie 2's initials was in his home. Kosco shoots at the cops, killing Deputy Reddy, then flees the scene by car, goes to Jay's home and murders him. Rita hears the gunshots and tries to drive away, but Kosco gets into her car and threatens her with a gun. She correctly guesses that Kosco is going to kill her, and rams head-on into another vehicle. Having earlier been to the garage, she knows that the airbag on the passenger side is faulty whilst the driver's side bag deploys, saving her. Kosco is killed.

Sanders is back with Rita, who is recovering at a hospital. Andy is back with Cassie, and Tommy T is in jail being assaulted by other prisoners.

== Cast ==
- Jon Hamm as Chief Jordan Sanders
- Tina Fey as Rita Grace
- Micah Stock as Jay Moore
- Nick Mohammed as Deputy Reddy
- Happy Anderson as Kosco
- Mary Holland as Maggie Lee Moore
- Nicholas Azarian as Greg
- Louisa Krause as Maggie Moore
- Derek Basco as Tommy T
- Christopher Denham as Andy Moore
- Tate Ellington as Duane Rich
- Bobbi Kitten as Cassie Novak

== Production ==
John Slattery directed the film from a Paul Bernbaum script. Slattery produced with Vincent Newman, Ross Kohn, Nancy Leopardi, Dan Reardon, and Santosh Govindaraju. Screen Media acquired North America distribution rights in February 2023.

=== Casting ===
Jon Hamm and Tina Fey joined the cast in February 2021. In September of that year Nick Mohammed joined the cast as a wisecracking police officer, and Micah Stock joined in a supporting role.

=== Filming ===
Principal photography began in and around Albuquerque, New Mexico in October 2021, with filming lasting into November 2021.

== Release ==
The film premiered at the Tribeca Film Festival in June 2023 and was released in theaters on June 16, 2023.

== Reception ==
On the review aggregator website Rotten Tomatoes, 51% of 73 critics' reviews are positive, with an average rating of 5.6/10. The website's consensus reads: "Neither funny enough to recommend as a black comedy nor unpredictable enough to work as a mystery, Maggie Moore(s) is less than the sum of its parts." Metacritic, which uses a weighted average, assigned the film a score of 43 out of 100, based on 15 critics, indicating "mixed or average" reviews.
