= Nick Mohammed =

British comedian and actor (born 1980)

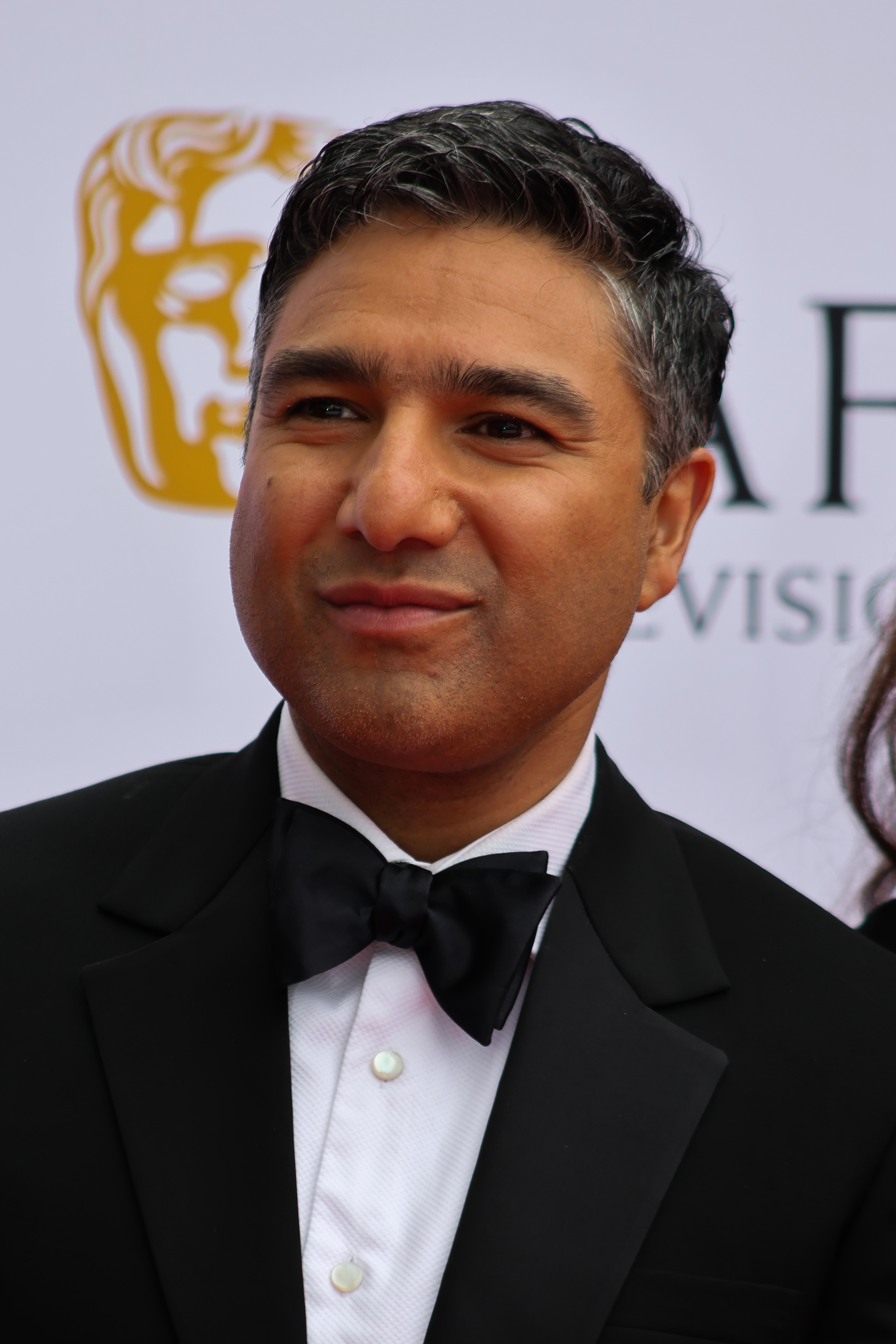
- Mohammed in 2026
- Born: Nicholas George Mohammed; 1980 (age 45–46); Leeds, England
- Other name: Mr. Swallow
- Education: Durham University (BSc); Magdalene College, Cambridge (attended)
- Occupations: Actor; comedian; writer
- Years active: 2006–present
- Spouse: Becca Mohammed (m. 2014)
- Children: 3

Nicholas George Mohammed (born 1980) is a British actor, comedian and writer. In the UK, he is best known for portraying the comedic character Mr. Swallow, originally on radio and later across both stage and television. He is also the creator, writer and star of the Sky One/Peacock comedy series Intelligence. Outside of the UK, Mohammed is best known for his role as Nathan "Nate" Shelley in the first three seasons of the Apple TV+ series Ted Lasso, for which he was nominated in the Outstanding Supporting Actor in a Comedy Series category at the 73rd and 74th Primetime Emmy Awards.

== Early life and education ==
Nicholas George Mohammed was born in Leeds, England. His mother was a Cyprus-born general practitioner and his Trinidad-born father worked in law.

Mohammed was educated at Abbey Grange High School in Leeds. He turned down an offer to study at the University of Cambridge and instead chose to study for a BSc in geophysics at Durham University, where he was a member of St Aidan's College and played violin in the university orchestra. He auditioned for the Durham Revue twice but failed to get in, and instead frequented the local comedy circuit.

After graduating from Durham in 2003, Mohammed began studying for a PhD in seismology at the Bullard Laboratories and Magdalene College, Cambridge. He did not complete his doctorate, after dropping out to pursue comedy. Whilst in Cambridge, he successfully auditioned for the Cambridge Footlights.

== Career ==
From ages 16 to 30, Mohammed worked as a close-up magician for hotels and weddings.

Mohammed is known for his character Mr Swallow, a megalomaniac magician. Developed during his time in Cambridge Footlights, the character's voice and attitude were inspired by his English teacher in secondary school, who spoke in the same high-pitched Northern accent as Mr Swallow does, and named for the fact she would swallow a lot in between sentences.

In 2010, Mohammed featured in the second series of BBC One's Reggie Perrin and was a co-presenter in BBC Three comedy series The King Is Dead alongside Simon Bird and Katy Wix. He made guest appearances in Pete & Dud: The Lost Sketches, Miranda, How Not to Live Your Life and Life's Too Short, and appeared in Series 2 Episode 4 of the BBC Radio 4 musical comedy show Alex Horne Presents The Horne Section.

Following his Radio 4 debut (Quarters), Mohammed had a second series Nick Mohammed in Bits (2010). He was a cast member of BAFTA-nominated CBBC sketch show Sorry, I've Got No Head, and supported Angelos Epithemiou (as one of his radio show characters, Mr Swallow) on his 2010 national tour. He had a supporting role in all three series of the E4 comedy Drifters.

In 2011, Mohammed wrote and starred in the original comedy-drama 'Magic', an episode of the Channel 4 anthology series Coming Up. From 2014 to 2016, he played Mr Love in CBBC show Hank Zipzer. He appeared in two episodes of Uncle in 2014 and 2015. In 2015, he joined the cast of ITV comedy The Job Lot. He wrote and starred in two series of Detective Sergeant Nick Mohammed, a comedy set in a police station, for BBC Radio 4.

In 2018, he voiced Piglet in the Disney film Christopher Robin. Also in 2018, it was announced that he would collaborate on a new comedy series titled Intelligence with David Schwimmer for Sky One. In 2019, Mohammed appeared in the second series of Stath Lets Flats. That same year, he also wrote and starred in the TV pilot, The Mr Swallow Show, for Channel 4, based on his Mr Swallow character; the show was not picked up to series.

From 2020 to 2023, he played Nathan "Nate" Shelley in the Apple TV series Ted Lasso. During the three series he appeared on the show, he was nominated for two Primetime Emmy Awards (2021 and 2022) and won a Screen Actors Guild Award as part of the ensemble in 2022.

In 2023, Mohammed starred as a policeman in the film Maggie Moore(s), alongside Jon Hamm and Tina Fey. He was a contestant on the 17th series of the Channel 4 show Taskmaster, which launched in March 2024.

In 2024, Mohammed opened A Christmas Carol(ish) at @sohoplace in London's West End for a Christmas run. The show was a re-telling of Charles Dickens's A Christmas Carol with Mr Swallow as the protagonist, also starring Martha Howe-Douglas, David Elms, and Kieran Hodgson. He originally developed the show at Soho Theatre in 2022.

In 2025, he appeared in the fifth season of Apple TV's Slow Horses as Mayor Zafar Jaffrey. Also in 2025, he starred in the action comedy film Deep Cover alongside Bryce Dallas Howard and Orlando Bloom.

In 2025, he toured the UK as Mr Swallow in new live show, Show Pony, with dates extended into 2026. He also appeared as a contestant on the first series of The Celebrity Traitors, about which he said, 'This is the first thing I've ever done as myself'. He made it to the final as a 'Faithful' alongside David Olusoga, before losing out to traitor Alan Carr.

Mohammed was in the 2025 Big Fat Quiz of the Year special, and was on the same team as Jonathan Ross; their team won.

In June 2026, he became the main face of the "World Cup Watchers' Rights Association" campaign with Australian broadcaster SBS, as part of their coverage of the 2026 FIFA World Cup.

Mohammed was awarded an honorary Doctor Of Letters by Durham University in July 2026.

Mohammed will play The Host in the world premiere of The Traitors: Acts of Betrayal at the Gillian Lynne Theatre in London's West End from May 2027.

== Personal life ==
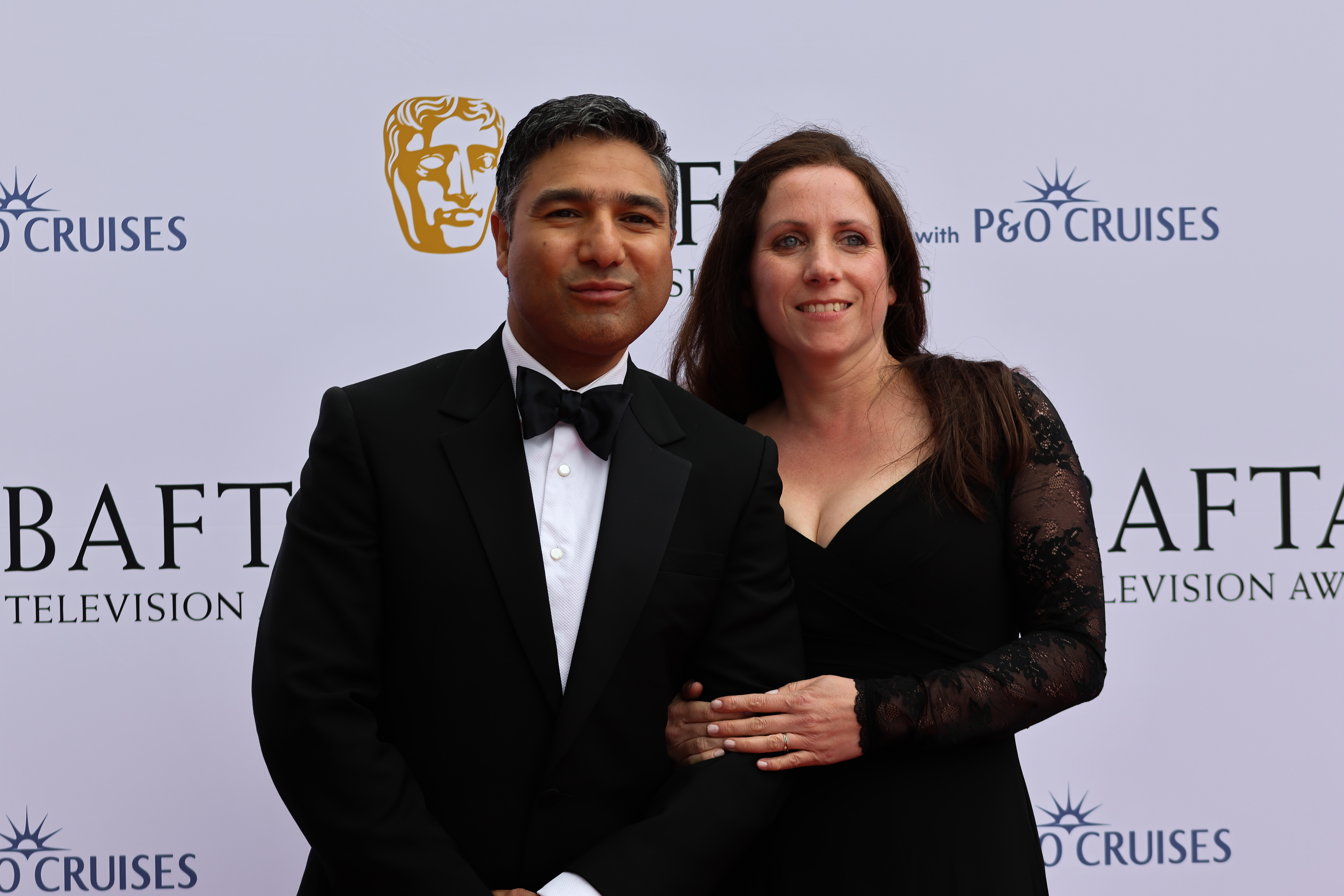
Mohammed with his wife Becca in 2026

Mohammed learned the violin as a child and played in his university orchestra at St Aidan's College at Durham University. There he met his future wife, Becca, whom he married in 2014. They have three children.

Mohammed moved to Richmond, London, in 2014, and lived there for nearly a decade before moving on. His eldest son, Finn, has an eidetic memory, which was showcased when they both appeared on an episode of 8 Out of 10 Cats Does Countdown.

Mohammed is allergic to fish and seafood.

== Acting credits ==
=== Film ===
Year	Title	Role	Notes
2012	Asylum Seekers	Adeem Akwal	Short film
2014	Benny & Jolene	Orlando	
2015	Baguettes	Man	Short film
2015	The Martian	Tim Grimes	
2016	Absolutely Fabulous: The Movie	Casper	
2016	Bridget Jones's Baby	Ariyaratina	
2016	The Darkest Universe	Benny	
2017	The Sense of an Ending	Postman Danny	
2017	Bridget Jones' Baby: Extended End Credits	Ariyaratina	Uncredited; short film; direct-to-video
2017	The Designers		Comic Relief short film
2017	Smear	Dr Wyndham	Short film
2018	Christopher Robin	Piglet	Voice role
2018	The Nutcracker and the Four Realms	Short Butler	
2019	The Kid Who Would Be King	Mr Hyde	
2020	Roald & Beatrix: The Tail of the Curious Mouse	Mr Entwhistle	
2022	Pragma	Professor Francis	
2023	Maggie Moore(s)	Deputy Reddy	
2023	Chicken Run: Dawn of the Nugget	Dr Fry	Voice role
2025	Deep Cover	Hugh	
TBA	Control		Post-production

=== Television ===
Year	Title	Role	Notes
2006	No Easy Task with Daniel Thornthwaite	Daniel Thornthwaite	Also writer; television film
2008–2011	Sorry, I've Got No Head	Various	17 episodes
2009–2010	Reggie Perrin	Steve	9 episodes
2010	The King Is Dead	Himself	With Simon Bird and Katy Wix
2010	The Persuasionists	DVD Shop Assistant	Episode: "The Charity"
2010	Miranda	Pete (Skydive Receptionist)	Episode: "Before I Die"
2011	Pixelface	Pharaoh	Episode: "High Spirits"
2011	Life's Too Short	Toby	Episode: "#1.5"
2013–2015	Drifters	Ash	7 episodes
2014	Uncle	Roopesh	6 episodes
2014–2016	Hank Zipzer	Mr Love	16 episodes; main cast (Season 1); recurring cast (Season 2); guest cast (Season 3)
2014–2018	Cuckoo	Policeman	Episodes: "Neighbourhood Watch" and "Ken's New Friend"
2014	Morning Has Broken	Mike	Also writer; television film
2015	Murder in Successville	Dynamo	Episode: "Bunch of Cults"
2015	Yonderland	Electrician	Episode: "Panic on the Streets of Yonderland"
2015–2017	Uncle	Roopesh	5 episodes
2015–2016	Drunk History	William Burke/John William Polidori	2 episodes
2015	The Job Lot	Ash	5 episodes
2016	Fresh Meat	Nas	2 episodes
2016	Camping	Dr Tolley	Episode: "#1.2"; television miniseries
2016	Sexy Murder	Simon Schinwold	3 episodes; television miniseries
2016	The Last Dragonslayer	Brian - Dragonslayer	Television film
2017	Mr. Swallow's Valentine	Mr Swallow	Also writer; television film
2018	Collateral	Fuzz Gupta	2 episodes; television miniseries
2018	Urban Myths	Horace Lambardi	Episode: "Agatha Christie"
2018	Oi Leonardo	Disciple	Television miniseries; Episode: "The Last Supper"
2018	Sally4Ever	Mark	Episode: "#1.4"
2018	Comedy Blaps	Benton	Episode: "Furious Andrew"
2018–2019	Space Chickens in Space	Finley (voice)	23 episodes
2019	Stath Lets Flats	Anthony Stappan	Episodes: "A Battle Of Our Lives" and "Congratulations, Please"
2019	Comedians Giving Lectures	Mr Swallow	Episode: "#1.7"
2019	Harry Hill's Clubnite	Mr Swallow	Episode: "#1.2"
2019, 2021, 2023, 2024	8 Out of 10 Cats Does Countdown	Mr Swallow	Episode: "18.4", Christmas special 2021, Christmas special 2023, Episode: "26.2"
2020–2023	Intelligence	Joseph Harries	Also writer
2020–2023	Ted Lasso	Nathan "Nate" Shelley	Main cast Nominated — Screen Actors Guild Award for Outstanding Performance by an Ensemble in a Comedy Series, 2021 and 2022
2020	Hitmen	The Human Spider	Episode: "Birthday"
2021	Inside No. 9	Gavin	Episode: "Simon Says"
2022	Mandy	Future Doctor	Episode: "The Curse of Mandy Carter"
2023	Killing Sherlock: Lucy Worsley on the Case of Conan Doyle	Himself	Episode 3: “Shadows and Sleuths”
2024	Renegade Nell	Billy Blind	8 episodes
2024	Taskmaster	Himself	Season 17 contestant
2024	Inside No. 9	Himself	Episode: "Plodding On"
2024	Alma's Not Normal	Jules Goodwin	Series 2
2025	The Planets and Star Wars at the Proms	Host	A BBC Proms concert
2025	Slow Horses	Zafar Jaffrey	Season 5
2025	The Celebrity Traitors	Himself	Contestant; series 1
2025	The Big Fat Quiz of the Year	Himself	Contestant
2025	LOL: Last One Laughing UK	Mr Swallow	Guest
2026	2026 Laurence Olivier Awards	Himself	Host
2026	War	Michael Stefano	

=== Theatre ===
Year	Title	Character	Venue	Notes
2023	The Very Best and Very Worst of Mr Swallow	Mr. Swallow	UK tour	Also writer
2024	A Christmas Carol (ish)	Mr. Swallow	@sohoplace	Also writer
2025	Inside No. 9 Stage/Fright	Guest star	Wyndham's Theatre	One night only
2025	Mr Swallow: Show Pony	Mr. Swallow	UK tour	Also writer
2026	Mr Swallow: Show Pony	Mr. Swallow	UK tour	Also writer
2027	The Traitors: Acts of Betrayal	The Host	Gillian Lynne Theatre	

== Awards and nominations ==
Year	Award	Category	Work	Result	Ref.
2021	Primetime Emmy Awards	Outstanding Supporting Actor in a Comedy Series	Ted Lasso	Nominated	
2022	Primetime Emmy Awards	Outstanding Supporting Actor in a Comedy Series	Ted Lasso	Nominated	
2021	Hollywood Critics Association	Best Supporting Actor in a Streaming Series, Comedy	Ted Lasso	Nominated	
2022	Hollywood Critics Association	Best Supporting Actor in a Streaming Series, Comedy	Ted Lasso	Nominated	
2021	HCA TV Gold Derby Awards	Comedy Supporting Actor	Ted Lasso	Nominated	
2021	International Online Cinema Awards (INOCA)	Best Supporting Actor in a Comedy Series	Ted Lasso	Nominated	
2021	Pena de Prata	Best Supporting Actor in a Comedy Series	Ted Lasso	Nominated	
2021	Pena de Prata	Best Ensemble in a Comedy Series (shared)	Ted Lasso	Won	
2021	Online Film & Television Association	Best Supporting Actor in a Comedy Series	Ted Lasso	Nominated	
2021	Screen Actors Guild Awards	Outstanding Performance by an Ensemble in a Comedy Series	Ted Lasso	Nominated	
2022	Screen Actors Guild Awards	Outstanding Performance by an Ensemble in a Comedy Series	Ted Lasso	Won	
2024	Screen Actors Guild Awards	Outstanding Performance by an Ensemble in a Comedy Series	Ted Lasso	Nominated	
2022	Royal Television Society Programme Awards	Comedy Performance - Male	Intelligence	Nominated	
2022	Offies	Best Performance Ensemble	A Christmas Carol-ish	Nominated	
