= The Celebrity Traitors series 1 =

2025 series of The Celebrity Traitors

The Celebrity Traitors
- Series 1
- Promotional poster for series 1
- Presented by: Claudia Winkleman
- No. of contestants: 19
- Winner: Alan Carr
- Runners-up: David Olusoga; Nick Mohammed
- Location: Ardross, Highland
- Companion show: The Celebrity Traitors: Uncloaked
- No. of episodes: 9

Release
- Original network: BBC One
- Original release: 8 October – 6 November 2025

Series chronology
- Next → Series 2

The first series of The Celebrity Traitors began airing on 8 October 2025 on BBC One. It was presented by Claudia Winkleman, with Ed Gamble fronting the companion show The Celebrity Traitors: Uncloaked on BBC Two.

The series concluded on 6 November 2025, when Alan Carr won the series as the last remaining Traitor, ultimately winning £87,500 for his chosen charity Neuroblastoma UK.

The series was the most watched show of the year on UK television, and the series finale was the most watched UK television broadcast of 2025. It is widely considered to be one of the best television shows of the year. The series received various awards, most notably two British Academy Television Awards (including one for Alan Carr winning), two British Academy Television Craft Awards, and one National Television Award (and contributed to Alan Carr winning the National Television Award for Special Recognition in 2026).

== Production ==
In August 2024, the BBC confirmed that The Celebrity Traitors had been commissioned, along with two more series of The Traitors, the first of which aired in January 2025. Speaking at the Edinburgh International Television Festival, Kalpna Patel-Knight, the BBC's head of entertainment, said: "The Traitors has well and truly established itself as an unmissable highlight of the year and the news of a fourth outing, alongside a brand new celebrity version coming to the BBC, will take the series to a whole new level. In April 2025, it was confirmed that the show would air in the autumn of that year, with October 2025 later specified.

Filming for the series began on 22 April 2025 at Ardross Castle and concluded the following month, consisting of 9 episodes due to air over four weeks from 8 October to 6 November 2025. Following the cast announcement, host Claudia Winkleman said "We're incredibly lucky these brilliant people have said yes. I’d love to say we'll take it easy on them, and they'll just wander round the castle and eat toast for a couple of weeks - but that would be a lie."

The final episode of the series was mistakenly released early online in Canada and New Zealand as the episode was mistakenly made available on the Crave and ThreeNow streaming services 24 hours in advance of its broadcast on BBC One, due to a miscommunication between All3Media International and its international partners.

== Contestants ==
The 19 celebrities competing in the series were revealed on 13 May 2025. Their chosen charities were not revealed until after the show had concluded, with the winner's charity named in the final.

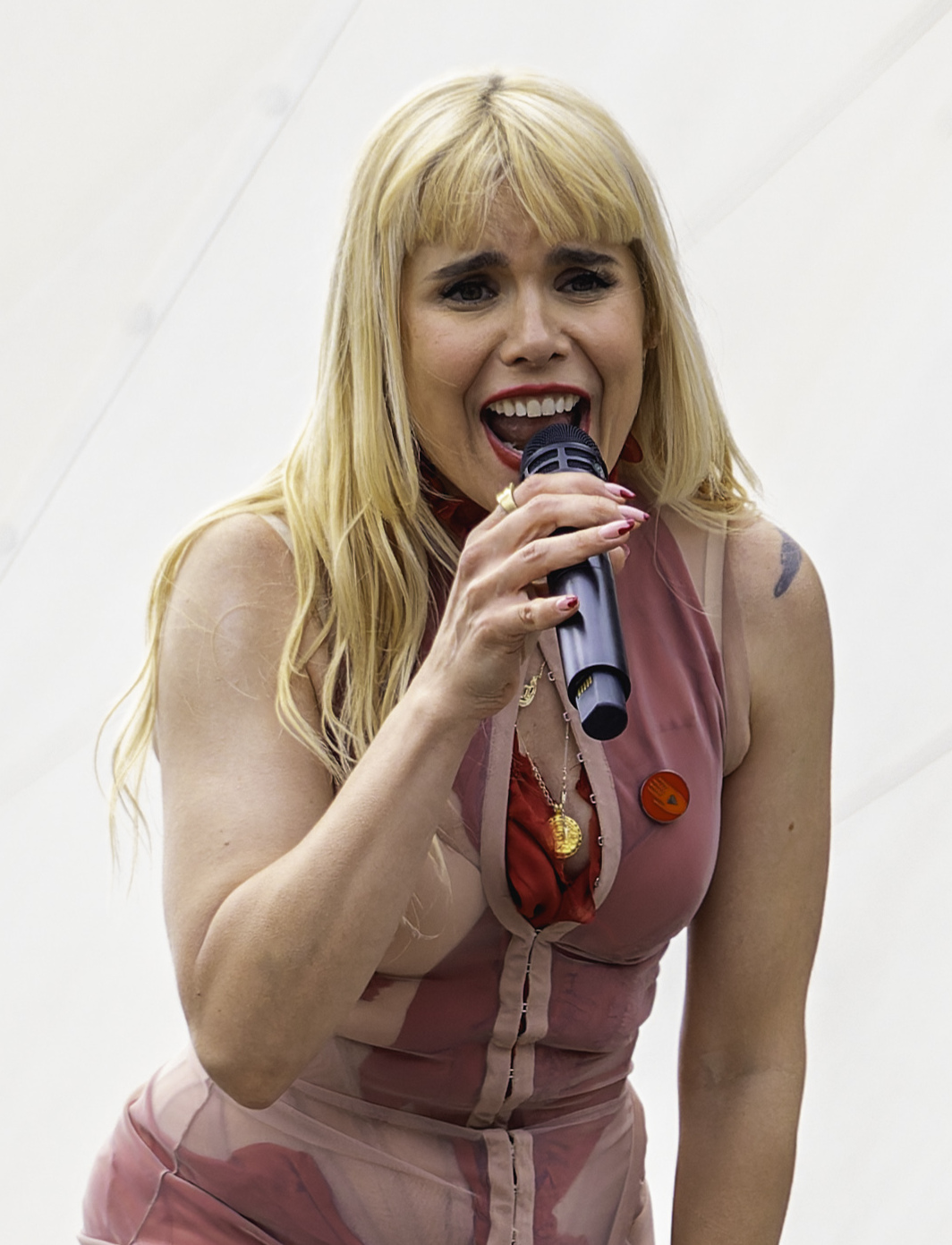
Paloma Faith

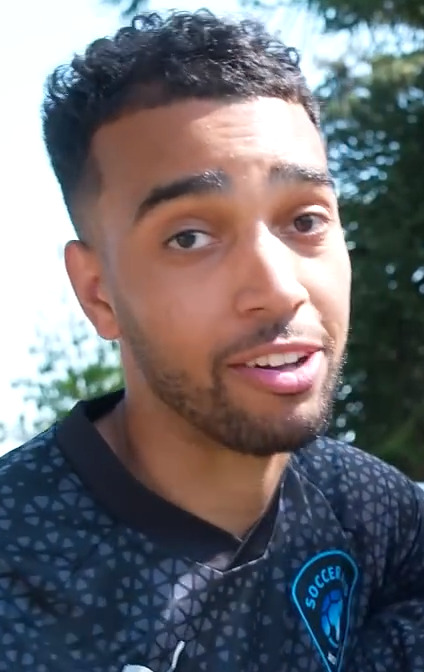
Niko Omilana

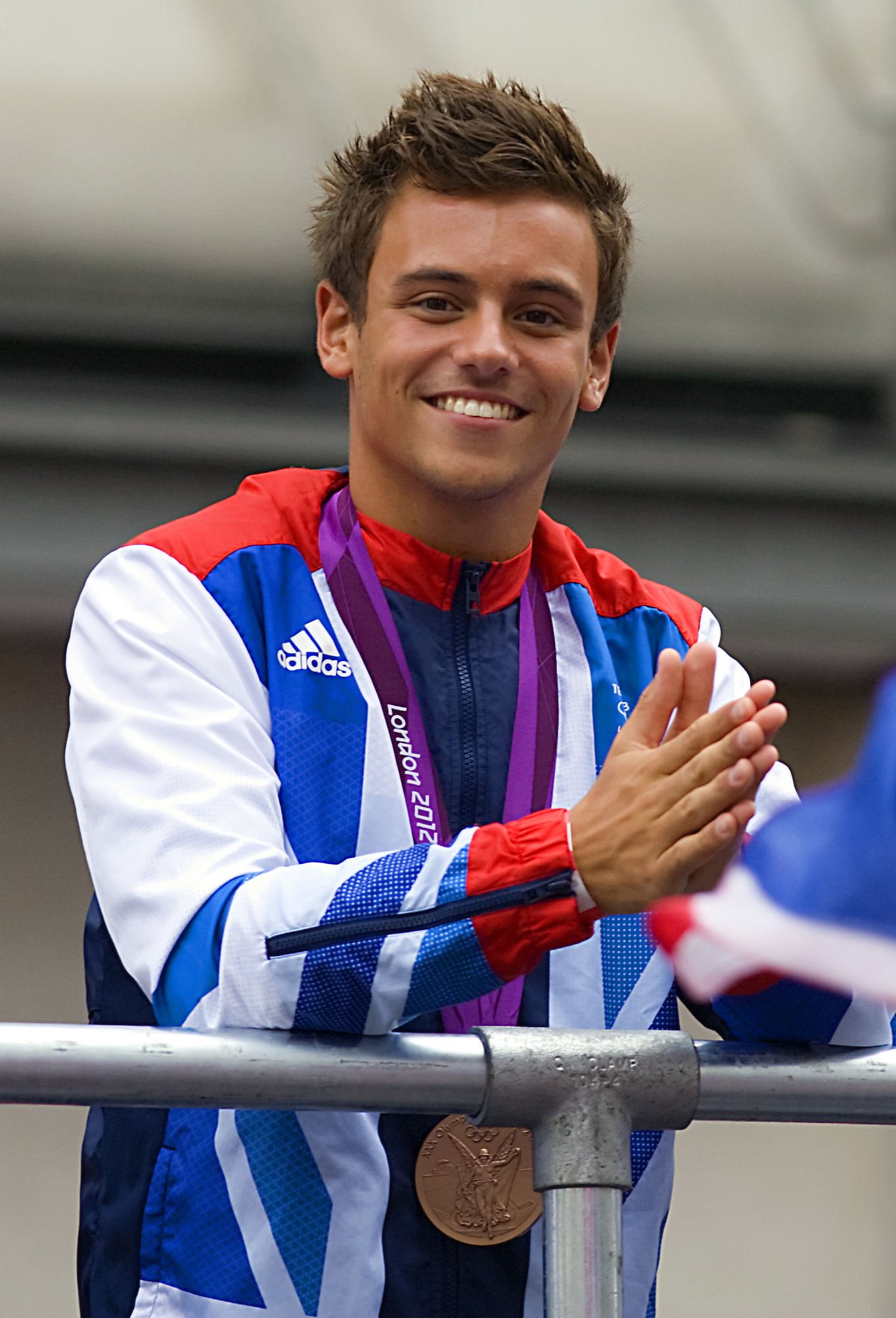
Tom Daley

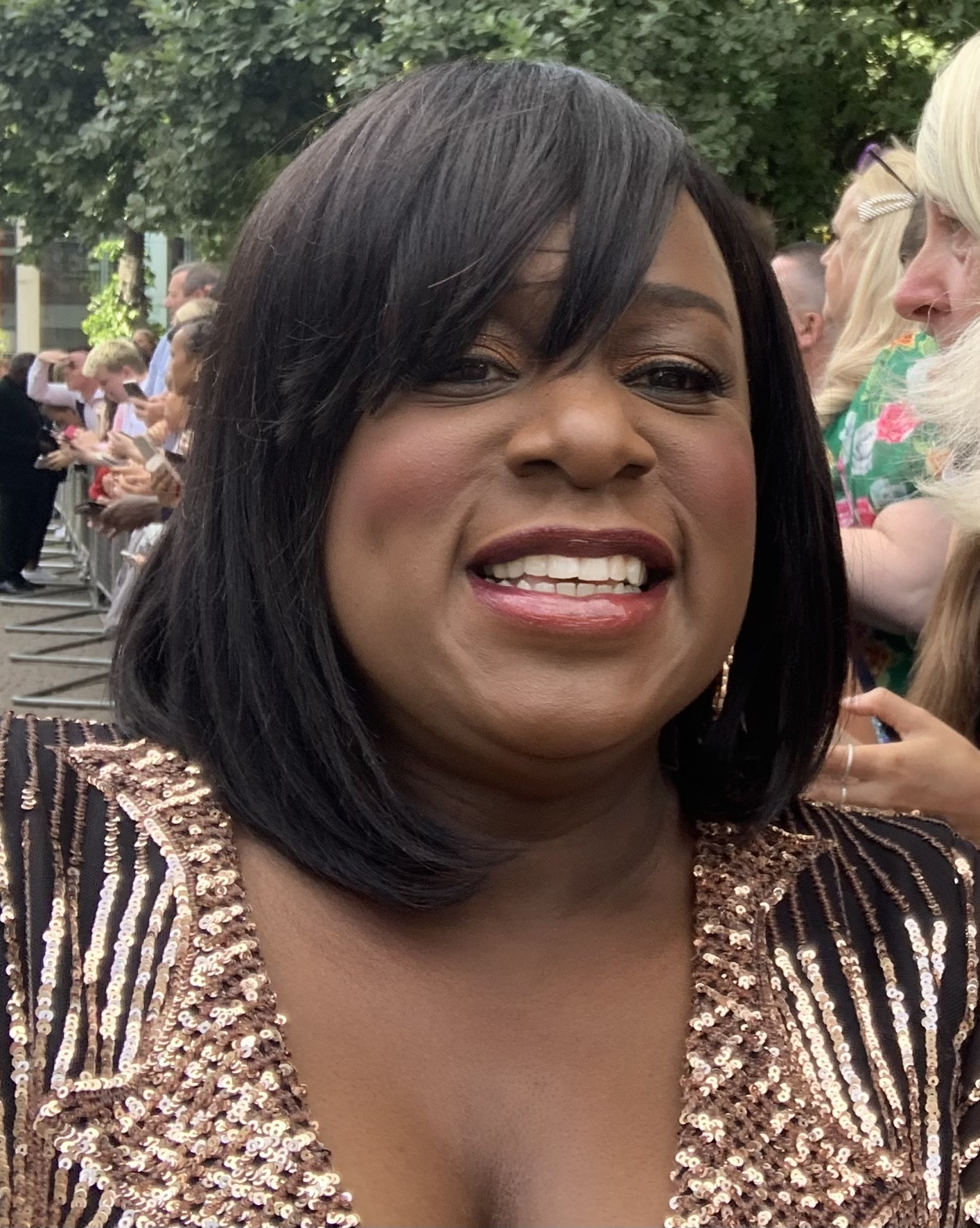
Tameka Empson

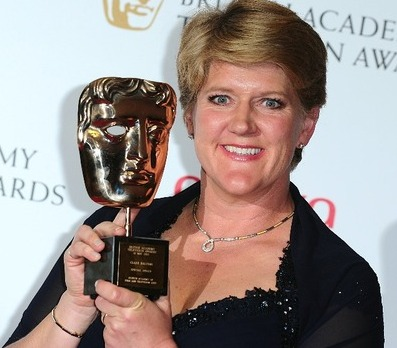
Clare Balding

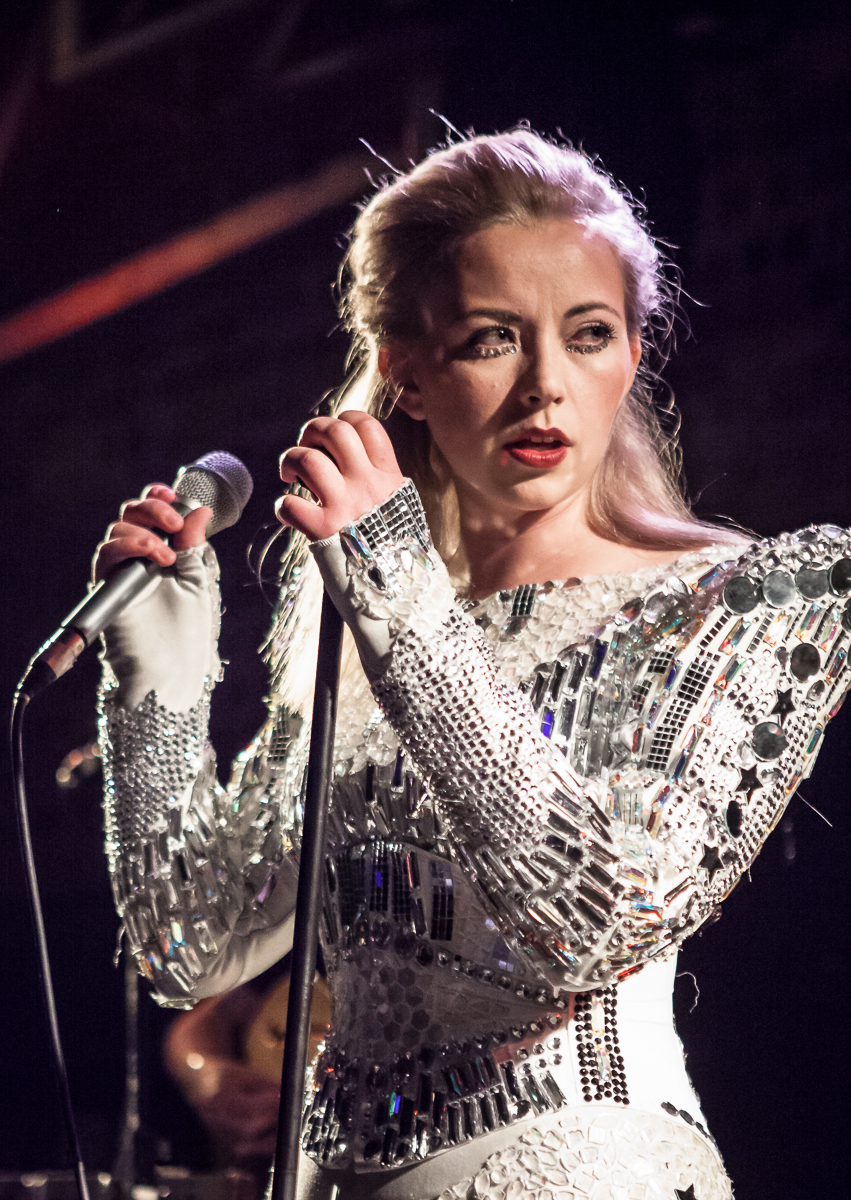
Charlotte Church

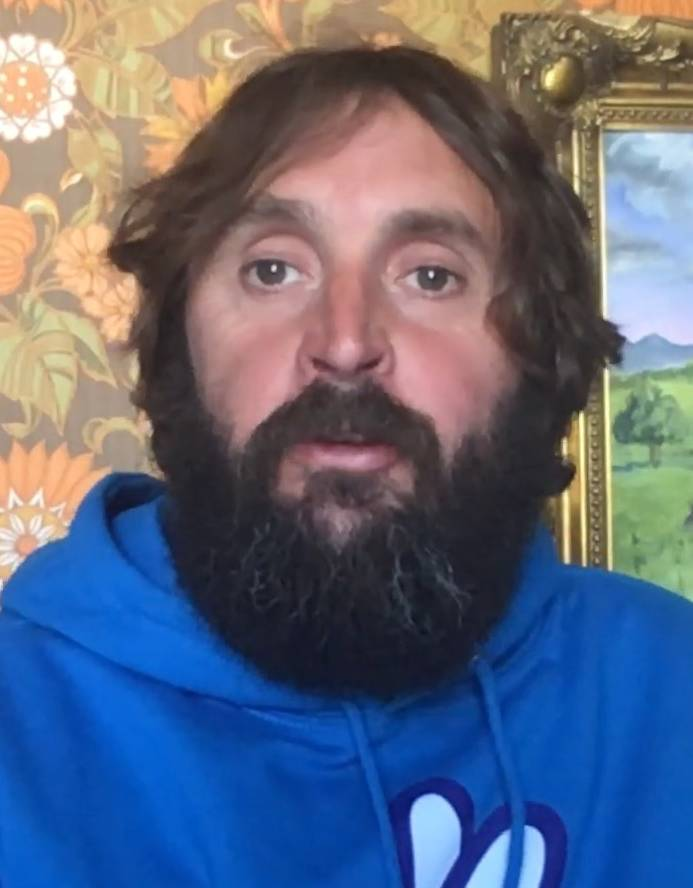
Joe Wilkinson

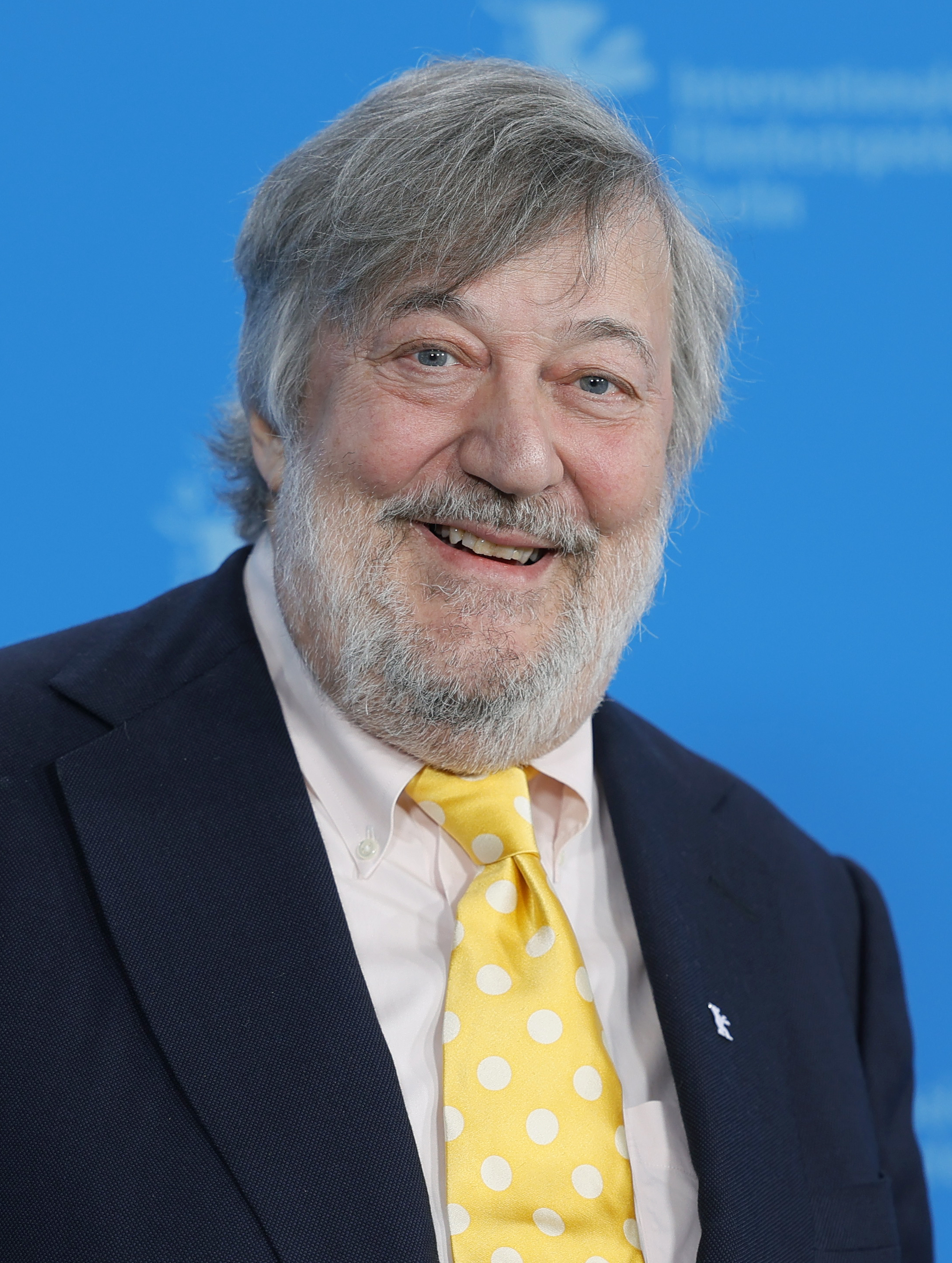
Sir Stephen Fry

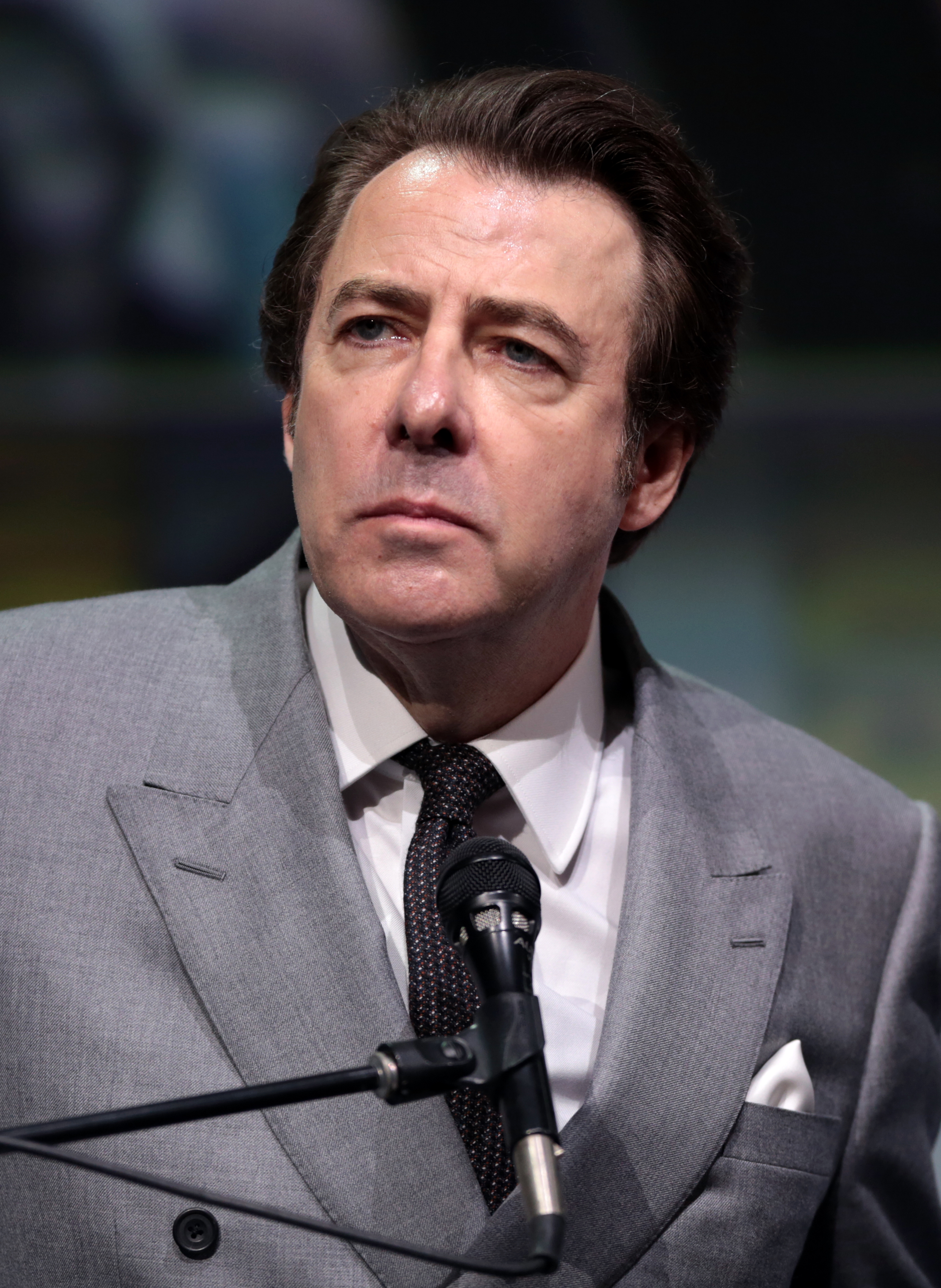
Jonathan Ross

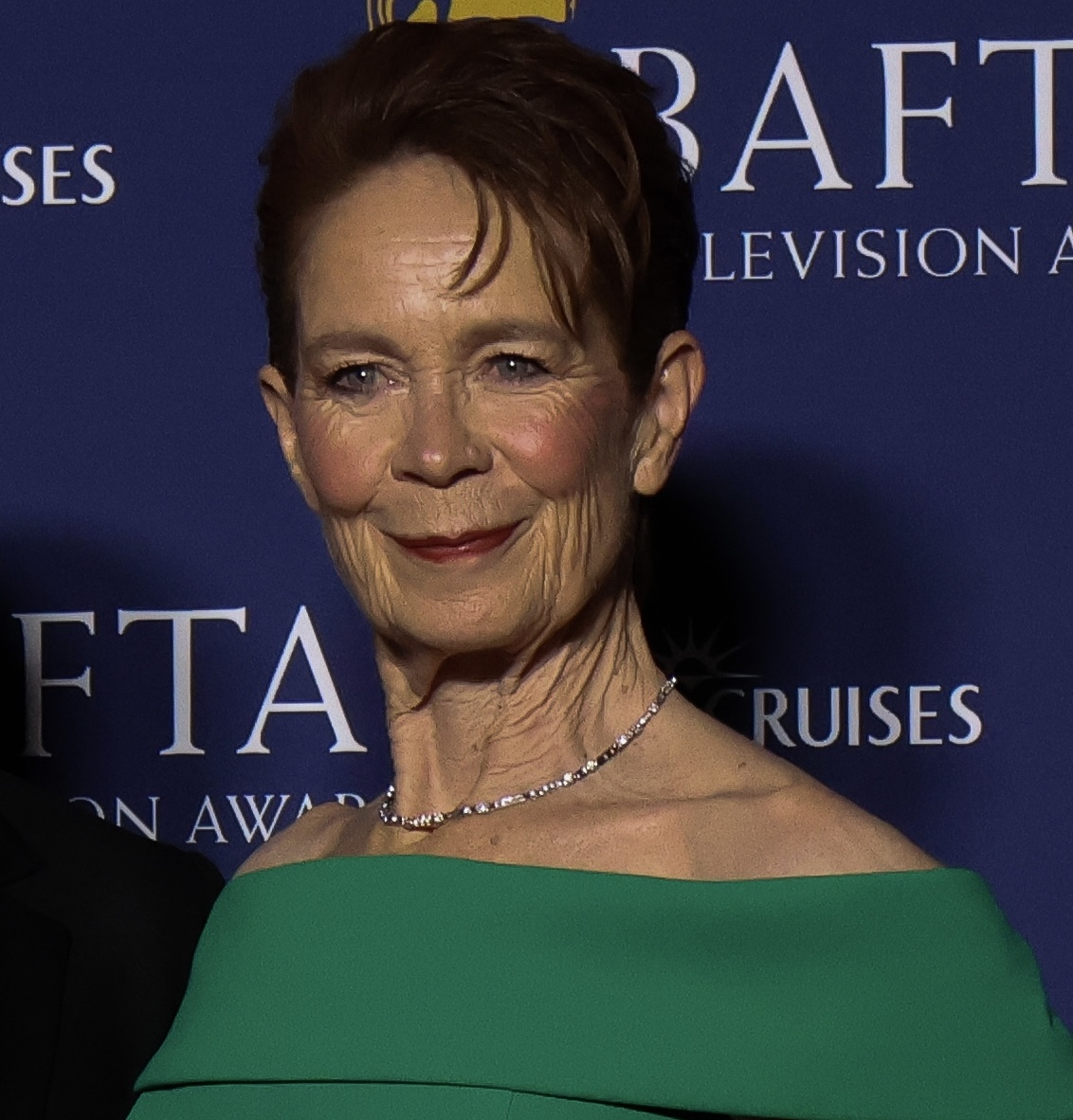
Celia Imrie

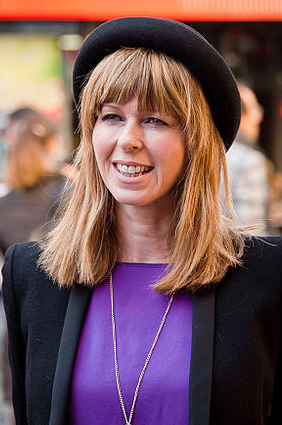
Kate Garraway

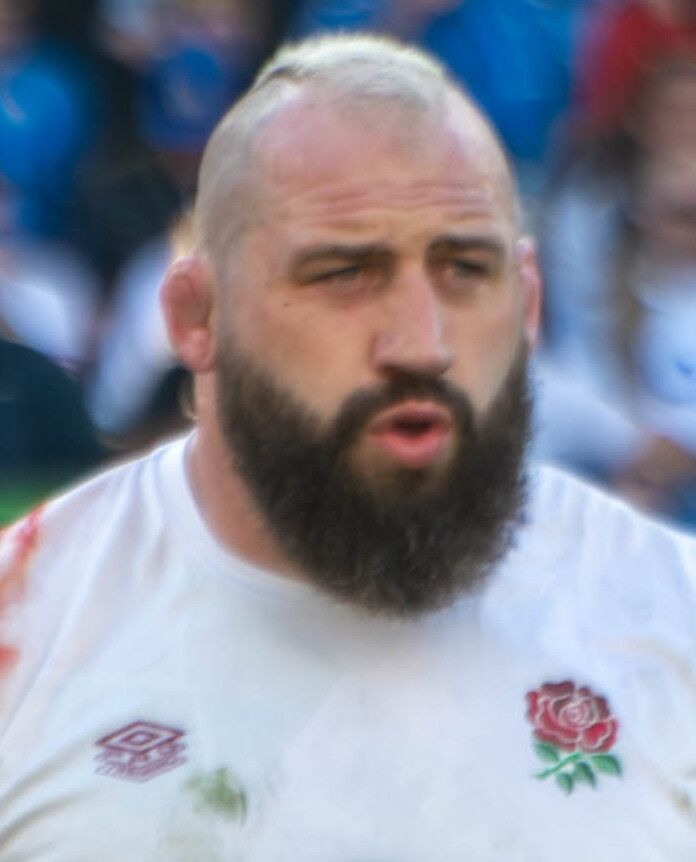
Joe Marler

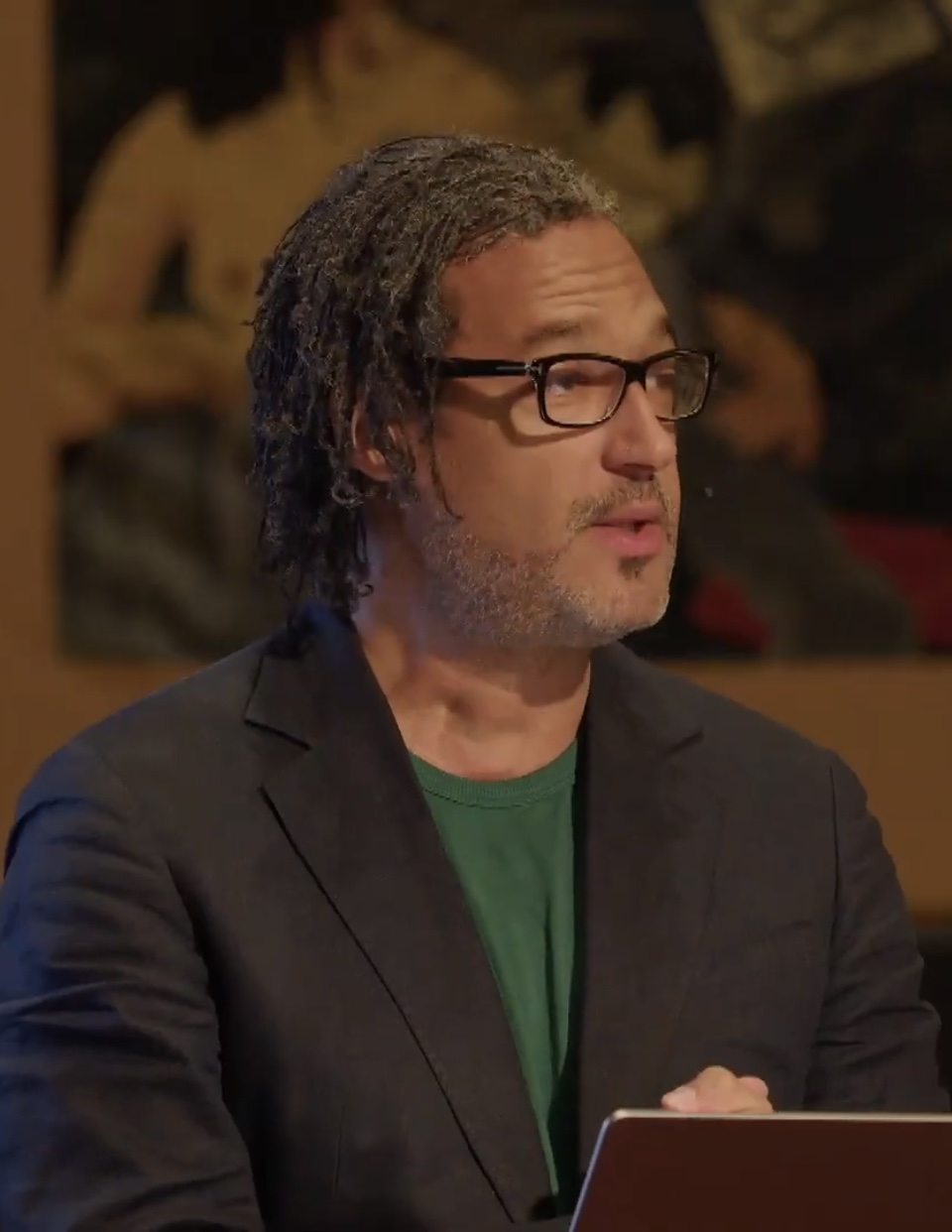
David Olusoga

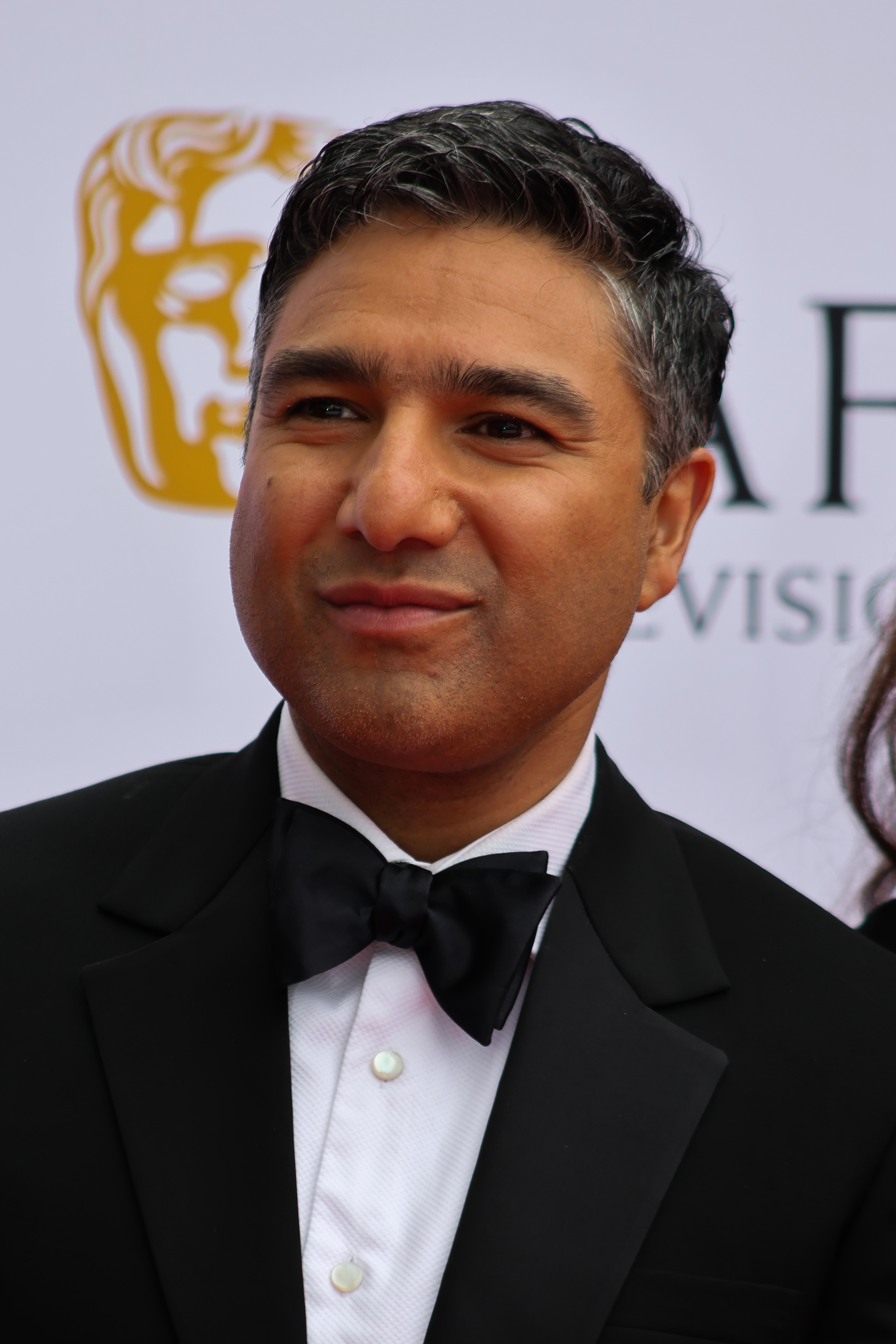
Nick Mohammed

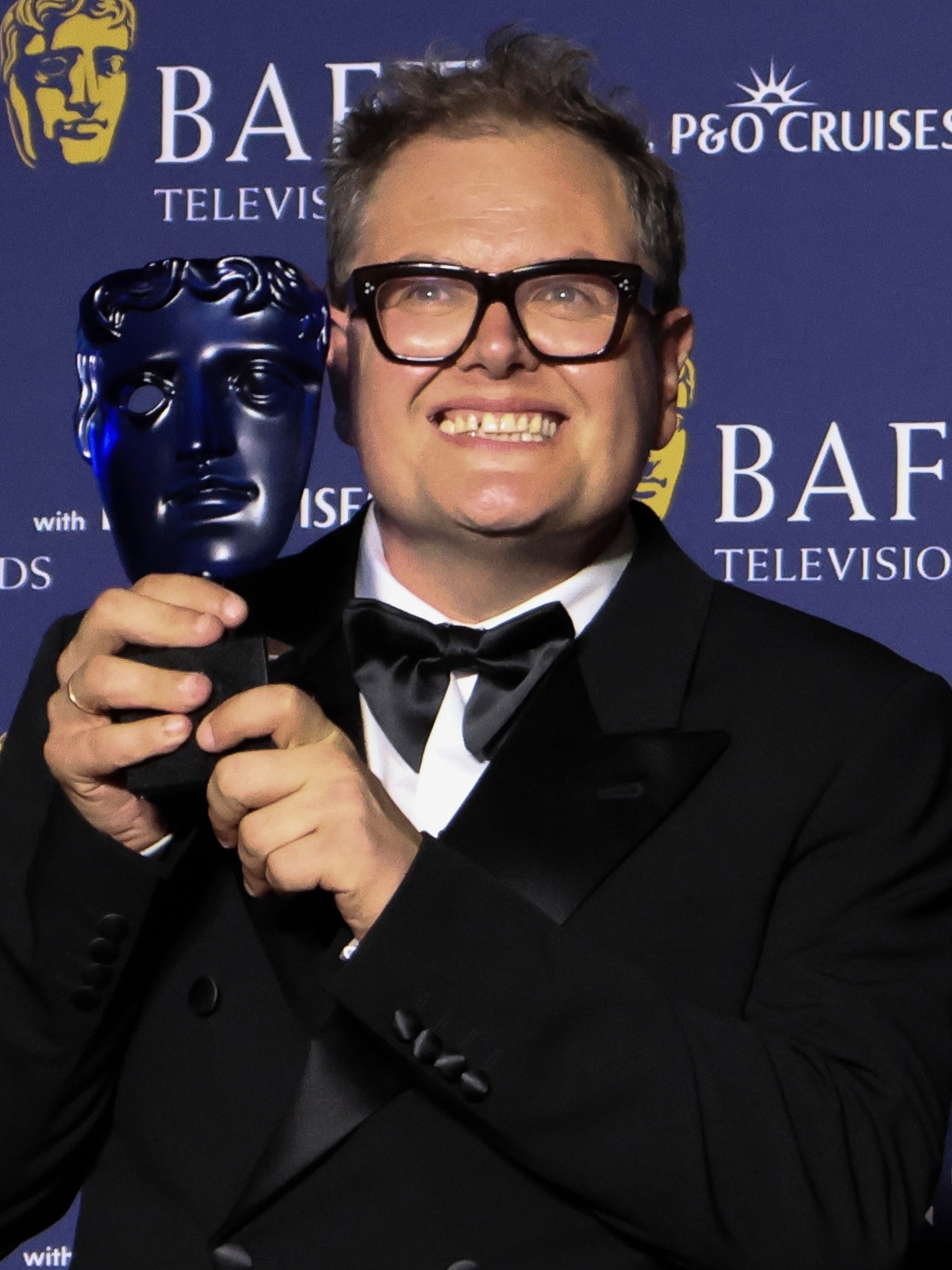
Alan Carr

Not pictured: Ruth Codd, Mark Bonnar, Lucy Beaumont and Cat Burns.

List of The Celebrity Traitors contestants
Contestant	Age (Note: As shown on screen.)	Notability	Chosen charity	Affiliation	Finish
Paloma Faith	44	Singer-songwriter & actress	Save the Children	Faithful	Murdered (Episode 2)
Niko Omilana	27	Content creator	Under One Sky	Faithful	Banished (Episode 3)
Tom Daley	31	Olympian & entrepreneur	The Brain Tumour Charity	Faithful	Murdered (Episode 3)
Tameka Empson	48	Actress, comedian & writer	Parkinson's UK	Faithful	Banished (Episode 3)
Ruth Codd	29	Actress	Almost Home Animal Rescue NI	Faithful	Murdered (Episode 4)
Clare Balding	54	Broadcaster & author	Cancer Research UK	Faithful	Banished (Episode 4)
Charlotte Church	39	Singer & activist	The Awen Project	Faithful	Murdered (Episode 5)
Mark Bonnar	56	Actor	Action for ME	Faithful	Banished (Episode 6)
Joe Wilkinson	50	Comedian	Wolo Foundation	Faithful	Murdered (Episode 6)
Stephen Fry	68	Actor, writer & presenter	Mind	Faithful	Banished (Episode 6)
Lucy Beaumont	42	Comedian	Zoe's Place	Faithful	Murdered (Episode 7)
Jonathan Ross	64	Presenter	Cancer Research UK	Traitor	Banished (Episode 7)
Celia Imrie	73	Actress	Beat	Faithful	Murdered (Episode 8)
Kate Garraway	58	Broadcaster	Carers First	Faithful	Banished (Episode 8)
Cat Burns	25	Singer-songwriter	National Autistic Society	Traitor	Banished (Episode 9)
Joe Marler	35	Former England rugby player	CALM	Faithful	Banished (Episode 9)
David Olusoga	55	Historian & film-maker	Bristol Dog Action Welfare Group Greyhound & Lurcher Rescue	Faithful	Runner-up (Episode 9)
Nick Mohammed	45	Actor & comedian	Blood Cancer UK	Faithful	Runner-up (Episode 9)
Alan Carr	49	Comedian	Neuroblastoma UK	Traitor	Winner (Episode 9)

== Elimination history ==
Key

The contestant was a Faithful.
The contestant was a Traitor.
The contestant was ineligible to vote.
The contestant was murdered by the traitors.
The contestant was banished at the round table.

Episode	1	2	3		4	5		6		7	8	9
Traitors' Decision	None	Paloma (Note: The Traitors were tasked to murder someone in plain sight, by touching the victim's face with their fingers after having touched a "poisoned" lily to gather its pollen. The Traitors were told that the victim would be present at breakfast the following morning. Alan chose to poison Paloma. The following morning, the players were told that the victim's identity would be revealed as part of that day's mission.)	Tom		Ruth	Charlotte		Joe W.		Lucy (Note: The three remaining potential murder victims from the losing team in the mission (Kate, Lucy and Nick) were all delivered a letter that said they must stand on the Traitors’ chessboard alone in the middle of the night. Then, the Traitor statue would move towards them and stop right before them. Finally, they would turn around. If they saw Claudia, they were safe from murder. However, if they saw the Traitors, that would mean they were murdered.)	Celia (Note: After Jonathan's banishment, Alan and Cat received a letter that said they must murder a Faithful in plain sight at that night’s dinner via saying the Shakespearean quote, "Parting is such a sweet sorrow". Alan murdered Celia.)	None
Traitors' Decision	None	Murder										None
Immune	Celia, ~~Charlotte,~~ (Note: Charlotte sacrificed her shield in the Trojan horse mission in Episode 1 to open a gate.); Joe M., Joe W., Jonathan, Kate	None	Clare, Mark		Cat, Stephen	David, Jonathan, Lucy, Nick		Alan, Cat, Celia, David, Joe M.		Joe M.	None	
Banishment	None		Niko	Tameka	Clare	Tie	Tie	Mark	Stephen	Jonathan	Kate	Cat
Vote	None		10–3– 2–2–1	4–2–2–2–1– 1–1–1–1–1	7–2–2– 1–1–1	4–4–2– 1–1	5–5 (Note: The first round of voting resulted in a tie. Per the rules, a second vote was held where the players involved in the tie would not vote and the remaining players could only vote for those who tied.)	Fate (Note: As David and Mark remained tied, they were presented with two chests, only one of which contained a shield. The player who selected the chest without a shield was banished.)	4–2–2– 1–1	6–1–1	3–2–1	3–2
Alan	No vote		Niko	Celia	David	Mark	Mark	No vote	Joe M.	Jonathan	David	David
David	No vote		Niko	Stephen	Clare	Stephen	No vote	No vote	Stephen	Nick	Kate	Cat
Nick	No vote		Niko	Tameka	Celia	Kate	Mark	No vote	Stephen	Jonathan	Cat	Cat
Joe M.	No vote		Niko	Kate	Jonathan	Mark	Mark	No vote	Jonathan	Jonathan	Kate	Cat
Cat	No vote		Kate	Stephen	Stephen	David	David	No vote	Stephen	Jonathan	Kate	David
Kate	No vote		Tameka	Tameka	Clare	Mark	Mark	No vote	Nick	Jonathan	David	Banished (Episode 8)
Celia	No vote		Charlotte	Cat	David	Jonathan	David	No vote	Joe M.	Jonathan	Murdered (Episode 8)	
Jonathan	No vote		Niko	Ruth	Clare	David	David	No vote	Stephen	David	Banished (Episode 7)	
Lucy	No vote		Niko	David	Clare	Mark	Mark	No vote	Jonathan	Murdered (Episode 7)		
Stephen	No vote		Niko	Charlotte	Clare	David	David	No vote	David	Banished (Episode 6)		
Joe W.	No vote		Tom	Jonathan	Clare	David	David	No vote	Murdered (Episode 6)			
Mark	No vote		Tameka	Tameka	Charlotte	Kate	No vote	No vote	Banished (Episode 6)			
Charlotte	No vote		Niko	Tameka	Clare	Murdered (Episode 5)						
Clare	No vote		Niko	Alan	Charlotte	Banished (Episode 4)						
Ruth	No vote		Kate	Jonathan	Murdered (Episode 4)							
Tameka	No vote		Kate	Celia	Banished (Episode 3)							
Tom	No vote		Niko	Murdered (Episode 3)								
Niko	No vote		Tom	Banished (Episode 3)								
Paloma	No vote		Murdered (Episode 2)									

=== End game ===
Episode	9			
Decision	Banish	Joe M.	End Game	Game Over; Traitor Win
Vote	4–0	3–1	3–0	Game Over; Traitor Win
Alan	Banish	Joe M.	End Game	Winner
David	Banish	Joe M.	End Game	Runners-up
Nick	Banish	Joe M.	End Game	Runners-up
Joe M.	Banish	Alan	Banished	

== Missions ==
Episode	Task description	Time limit	Money earned	Money available	Running total	Shield winner(s)
1	Players were taken to a simulated 'graveyard' with tombstones bearing their names. Buried inside each grave was a shield. The first six players to dig out their shield received protection from being murdered.	No time limit	—N/a			Celia
1	Players were taken to a simulated 'graveyard' with tombstones bearing their names. Buried inside each grave was a shield. The first six players to dig out their shield received protection from being murdered.	No time limit	—N/a			Charlotte
1	Players were taken to a simulated 'graveyard' with tombstones bearing their names. Buried inside each grave was a shield. The first six players to dig out their shield received protection from being murdered.	No time limit	—N/a			Joe M.
1	Players were taken to a simulated 'graveyard' with tombstones bearing their names. Buried inside each grave was a shield. The first six players to dig out their shield received protection from being murdered.	No time limit	—N/a			Joe W.
1	Players were taken to a simulated 'graveyard' with tombstones bearing their names. Buried inside each grave was a shield. The first six players to dig out their shield received protection from being murdered.	No time limit	—N/a			Jonathan
1	Players were taken to a simulated 'graveyard' with tombstones bearing their names. Buried inside each grave was a shield. The first six players to dig out their shield received protection from being murdered.	No time limit	—N/a			Kate
1	A 2.5-ton wooden Trojan horse had to be pulled along a path through four locked gates to a fire pit in order to be set alight. At each gate, players had to solve a puzzle or sacrifice a shield in order to move forward. The first gate required players to answer the question "How many people died in Shakespeare's Romeo & Juliet and Hamlet combined?" and enter the result into a numeric lock. The second required solving a Klotski puzzle to release a key. The third gate presented players with 16 words and required them to choose the 4 words that were unlike the others. The fourth and final gate, which could only be bypassed by forfeiting two shields, presented players with 18 symbols and required them to remember the 3 symbols that had unknowingly been visible on the previous gates and place them in the correct order.	30 minutes	£15,000	£15,000	£15,000 (of £15,000)	No shield on offer
2	Players had to identify who amongst them was unknowingly poisoned the night before through a series of clues. They were presented with 3 coffins meant for 3 players the Traitors had chosen: the murder victim (Paloma) and two decoys (Niko & Lucy). For each coffin, up to 3 clues were offered based on the celebrity's past, with £3,000 awarded for a correct identification after only 1 clue, and £500 deducted for each additional clue. After the coffins were filled, another £4,000 were awarded if the murder victim was then correctly identified.	No time limit	£4,500	£13,000	£19,500 (of £28,000)	No shield on offer
3	Players were locked and chained to a ring located at the centre of a cabin. Keys were required to release each individual, with £500 awarded for every successful release. Each key was accompanied by a clue intended to guide players to the next. Two shields were also obtainable during the mission.	25 minutes	£8,000	£8,000	£27,500 (of £36,000)	Clare
3	Players were locked and chained to a ring located at the centre of a cabin. Keys were required to release each individual, with £500 awarded for every successful release. Each key was accompanied by a clue intended to guide players to the next. Two shields were also obtainable during the mission.	25 minutes	£8,000	£8,000	£27,500 (of £36,000)	Mark
4	Players were divided into two teams. The forest team had to find banshees, memorize their wails, and recreate the wail into a water well. The garden team heard these recreations by submerging their heads underwater in another well, and had to match each melody to one in a named locket to identify the banshee. £1,000 were awarded for each correct match. Two shields were on offer, hidden in the garden.	30 minutes	£4,000	£5,000	£31,500 (of £41,000)	Cat
4	Players were divided into two teams. The forest team had to find banshees, memorize their wails, and recreate the wail into a water well. The garden team heard these recreations by submerging their heads underwater in another well, and had to match each melody to one in a named locket to identify the banshee. £1,000 were awarded for each correct match. Two shields were on offer, hidden in the garden.	30 minutes	£4,000	£5,000	£31,500 (of £41,000)	Stephen
5	At four traps, each worth £2,500, players faced questions about eliminated contestants. They could allocate funds across multiple answer options. The player positioned at the correct answer received a shield and added their money to the prize fund. Those trapped at incorrect answers were eliminated from the mission.	No time limit	£7,000	£10,000	£38,500 (of £51,000)	David
5	At four traps, each worth £2,500, players faced questions about eliminated contestants. They could allocate funds across multiple answer options. The player positioned at the correct answer received a shield and added their money to the prize fund. Those trapped at incorrect answers were eliminated from the mission.	No time limit	£7,000	£10,000	£38,500 (of £51,000)	Jonathan
5	At four traps, each worth £2,500, players faced questions about eliminated contestants. They could allocate funds across multiple answer options. The player positioned at the correct answer received a shield and added their money to the prize fund. Those trapped at incorrect answers were eliminated from the mission.	No time limit	£7,000	£10,000	£38,500 (of £51,000)	Lucy
5	At four traps, each worth £2,500, players faced questions about eliminated contestants. They could allocate funds across multiple answer options. The player positioned at the correct answer received a shield and added their money to the prize fund. Those trapped at incorrect answers were eliminated from the mission.	No time limit	£7,000	£10,000	£38,500 (of £51,000)	Nick
6	The players faced an giant chess board featuring their names. The celebrities split into two teams. Each team was required to respond to questions that the Traitors had been asked the previous night and position a headstone on the name of the player they thought the Traitors had chosen. After a series of rounds, the team with the most correct answers were granted a shield.	No time limit	£5,000	£5,000	£43,500 (of £56,000)	Alan
6	The players faced an giant chess board featuring their names. The celebrities split into two teams. Each team was required to respond to questions that the Traitors had been asked the previous night and position a headstone on the name of the player they thought the Traitors had chosen. After a series of rounds, the team with the most correct answers were granted a shield.	No time limit	£5,000	£5,000	£43,500 (of £56,000)	Cat
6	The players faced an giant chess board featuring their names. The celebrities split into two teams. Each team was required to respond to questions that the Traitors had been asked the previous night and position a headstone on the name of the player they thought the Traitors had chosen. After a series of rounds, the team with the most correct answers were granted a shield.	No time limit	£5,000	£5,000	£43,500 (of £56,000)	Celia
6	The players faced an giant chess board featuring their names. The celebrities split into two teams. Each team was required to respond to questions that the Traitors had been asked the previous night and position a headstone on the name of the player they thought the Traitors had chosen. After a series of rounds, the team with the most correct answers were granted a shield.	No time limit	£5,000	£5,000	£43,500 (of £56,000)	David
6	The players faced an giant chess board featuring their names. The celebrities split into two teams. Each team was required to respond to questions that the Traitors had been asked the previous night and position a headstone on the name of the player they thought the Traitors had chosen. After a series of rounds, the team with the most correct answers were granted a shield.	No time limit	£5,000	£5,000	£43,500 (of £56,000)	Joe M.
7	Players worked in pairs to cross an unstable and incomplete wooden bridge, with one player attempting the crossing, and the other guiding from the opposite end. The crossing player earned money by safely walking past the four £500 markers along the way. Midway, a shield bag hanging overhead had to be retrieved, carried to the gap at the end of the bridge, and successfully thrown to their teammate for an additional £500. If the crossing player fell along the way, only the earnings accumulated from the passed markers were banked. Guiding players who caught the bag then chose a player's portrait to place in a single shield-shaped frame. After all the pairs had completed the mission, the portrait that remained in the frame was awarded the shield.	No time limit	£10,000	£10,000	£53,500 (of £66,000)	Joe M.
8	Players had to carry six of 19 mannequin heads modelled after the show participants from one end of the room to the six mannequin bodies lacking heads at the other, while avoiding laser beams that crisscrossed the room. If a player broke a beam, an alarm triggered and the player had to discard their head and start over with another. Certain lasers could be deactivated via buttons located along the route. £2,000 were awarded for each successful match, with an additional £2,000 awarded if all six statues received heads.	20 minutes	£14,000	£14,000	£67,500 (of £80,000)	No shield on offer
Finale	The Traitors Express was boarded by the five finalists, who were required to progress through the carriages in search of keys. Four locked crates were located in the fifth and final carriage, each containing £5,000 worth of gold. Prior to the train's arrival at the end of the line, the crates needed to be successfully unlocked and the gold collected. Claudia needed to be reached before the crates, also containing explosives, were detonated.	20 minutes	£20,000	£20,000	£87,500 (of £100,000)	No shield on offer

== Episodes ==
No. overall	No. in series	Title	Original release date	UK viewers (millions)
1	1	"Episode 1"	8 October 2025	12.46
Nineteen celebrities arrived at the castle, but were turned around and taken to a 'graveyard' with headstones bearing each of the players' names. The players were instructed to physically dig their own grave to try and find the shield buried within. The first six players to find shields would be safe from the first murder. Jonathan Ross, Joe Marler, Joe Wilkinson, Kate Garraway, Charlotte Church and Celia Imrie got shields. At the round table, Jonathan Ross, Cat Burns and Alan Carr were chosen as traitors. For the next mission, the players had to drag a Trojan Horse a great distance. Each checkpoint featured a gate at which they had to solve a puzzle or answer a question to unlock it. Failing that, a player could give up their shield to open the door. After Clare Balding accidentally locked in a wrong answer, Charlotte Church gave up her shield. They passed the other gates without sacrificing any more shields and banked £15,000. The Traitors were later told they had to commit their first murder in plain sight, with Alan Carr electing to do so.
2	2	"Episode 2"	9 October 2025	11.87
It was revealed that Alan Carr had chosen to murder Paloma Faith in plain sight, but that her murder would be revealed at the upcoming mission. The mission had the players identify three potential victims based on clues before guessing the true victim's identity. The players could get more hints by sacrificing money. The previous night, the Traitors selected two other players as potential victims, choosing Lucy Beaumont and Niko Omilana. Due to needing many hints, making several incorrect guesses, and incorrectly guessing that Lucy Beaumont had been murdered, they only banked £4,500 out of a possible £13,000. Paloma's death shocked most of the remaining players. At the round table, Niko Omilana, Tameka Empson and Kate Garraway came under the most scrutiny. The episode ended on a cliffhanger of who would be eliminated.
3	3	"Episode 3"	15 October 2025	13.23
Niko Omilana was the first person to be banished from the round table. Clare Balding reminded everyone that Jonathan Ross talked about an alliance between him, Niko, Clare & Ruth Codd in the car. The Traitors murdered Tom Daley. Ruth challenged Jonathan about breaking the car alliance and turning on Niko. In the mission, the players were chained up in Claudia’s Cabin and would earn £500 for every player who was freed. Four keys were inside the cabin, the rest were outside. Nick Mohammed, Mark Bonnar, Stephen Fry, and Cat Burns were the first to be freed. Their actions outside the cabin changed the conditions inside. Water sprayed from the ceiling, the electric box sparked and smelly feathers were blasted. All the players escaped and the full £8,000 was banked. Clare Balding and Mark Bonnar got shields. Joe Marler and Joe Wilkinson theorised that a “Big Dog” - likely Jonathan Ross - was a Traitor. At the Round Table, the vote was extremely split, with 10 players receiving votes. Alan Carr, Kate Garraway, Cat Burns, Charlotte Church, David Olusoga and Ruth Codd all received one vote. Jonathan Ross, Stephen Fry and Celia Imrie received two votes, but Tameka Empson was banished after receiving just four out of sixteen votes. The Traitors met up to debate who to murder next.
4	4	"Episode 4"	16 October 2025	12.85
The Traitors decided to murder Ruth Codd. They hoped the Faithfuls would think that Jonathan was being set up. In the mission, the players were split into two teams. One team would run through the forest to find screaming banshees and then mimic their screams down a well. The other team would dunk their heads in a well in the garden to hear their mimicking. They would then try and match the sound to a locket with a name on it. The Forest Team consisted of Alan Carr, Lucy Beaumont, Celia Imrie, Joe Wilkinson, Joe Marler, Nick Mohammed and Cat Burns. The Garden Team consisted of Stephen Fry, Charlotte Church, Mark Bonnar, Clare Balding, David Olusoga, Jonathan Ross and Kate Garraway. They banked £4,000 out of a total £5,000. There were two shields available, with Cat Burns and Stephen Fry finding them. However, the Forest Team decided not to tell the Garden Team who got the shield in their group. At the round table, suspicion was directed onto Clare Balding by Jonathan. Charlotte Church and David Olusoga received two votes; Jonathan Ross, Celia Imrie and Stephen Fry received one vote; Clare Balding was banished with seven votes. The Traitors met up again to debate who to murder; they discussed Charlotte Church, Kate Garraway, and David Olusoga as possible victims.
5	5	"Episode 5"	22 October 2025	13.27
It was revealed that the Traitors had murdered Charlotte Church. During the mission, the players won £7,000 out of a possible £10,000 by answering questions about the life or career of some of the players who had previously been banished or murdered. Four players won shields: Nick Mohammed, Lucy Beaumont, David Olusoga, and Jonathan Ross. The episode ended on a cliffhanger as David Olusoga and Mark Bonnar were tied on 5 votes each after two rounds of voting. Claudia announced that the person to be banished would be decided by "the hands of fate".
6	6	"Episode 6"	23 October 2025	13.61
Mark Bonnar was banished after losing the tie-break. The traitors later murder Joe Wilkinson. Prior to the mission, the traitors had to answer three questions about the contestants. Then during the mission, the contestants had to divide into two groups and guess the traitors' answers. The team consisting of Joe Marler, Alan Carr, Cat Burns, David Olusoga and Celia Imrie answered the most questions correctly, winning shields. Nick Mohammed deliberately sabotaged the final round as he believed there were more traitors in his team. At the round table, the group vote to banish Stephen Fry. The faithfuls without shields - Nick Mohammed, Kate Garraway and Lucy Beaumont - are informed that one of them will be murdered face to face by the traitors. The episode ends on a cliffhanger as to who would be murdered.
7	7	"Episode 7"	29 October 2025	13.79
Lucy Beaumont was murdered face to face by the traitors. In the mission, the players were paired up. One of them would cross a rickety bridge earning money as they reached checkpoints. They would then throw a shield bag to the other player who was guiding them. The second player could then choose another player to be shielded. Whoever ended up in the shield at the end would win. The pairs were; Alan Carr and Kate Garraway; Nick Mohammed and Jonathan Ross; Cat Burns and Celia Imrie; Joe Marler and David Olusoga; Joe Marler ended up getting the shield. With a lot of heat on Jonathan, Alan Carr and Cat Burns debated the risks of sticking with him or throwing him under the bus. At the Round Table, a lot of attention was called to Jonathan Ross. He was eliminated by a nearly unanimous vote (with only David Olusoga voting for Nick Mohammed and both Alan Carr and Cat Burns voting for Jonathan) making him the first traitor to be eliminated from the game. Claudia announced that, in the final, the players would not reveal their identities as they exited the game. Also, to celebrate there would be a dinner party held for the surviving players. The remaining Traitors were told they would have to murder in plain sight one more time, but this time around, they have to do it at the dinner party by toasting a faithful and saying “parting is such sweet sorrow”.
8	8	"Episode 8"	30 October 2025	14.10
At the dinner party, the players discussed how much they had enjoyed and been changed by the experience of the game. Alan Carr decided to murder Celia Imrie claiming the quote was something he’d heard from Stephen Fry (at Cat’s suggestion). The next morning, the faithfuls tried to work out how the murder in plain sight was done. In the mission, the players had to take the mannequin heads of the players and place them on six statues across the room. They had to avoid a laser grid. If one of them hit a laser, they would have to discard the head and pick a new one. The players succeeded and added the full £14,000 to the prize pot. Suspicions fell on Kate Garraway and David Olusoga at the Round Table with Nick Mohammed also bringing up his theory about Cat Burns being a traitor. Kate Garraway and Alan Carr voted for David Olusoga; Nick Mohammed voted for Cat Burns; Cat Burns, Joe Marler & David Olusoga voted for Kate Garraway and she was banished. Afterwards, Joe Marler was convinced that Alan Carr and Cat Burns were traitors and tried to get David Olusoga and Nick Mohammed on side ahead of the final. Claudia summoned all five players down to the fire pit and announced there would be no murder and that they were the finalists. She had each of them declare that they were a faithful.
9	9	"Finale"	6 November 2025	14.94
With no murder, all players met at breakfast and discussed the journey they had in the show. Convinced that Alan Carr and Cat Burns were Traitors, Joe Marler formed a plan with Nick Mohammed - who was convinced Cat was a traitor - to get David Olusoga on side ahead of the round table. The mission was on board the Traitors steam train. The players had twenty minutes to go through four carriages and solve puzzles for keys to crates with £5,000 worth of gold in them. At the end of the time, the crates on final carriage would explode. The total amount to win was £20,000 which the players managed to get. This brought the final prize total to £87,500. Joe Marler convinced Alan Carr and Cat Burns that he would vote for David at the final Round Table to keep them unsuspecting. Meanwhile, Nick Mohammed spoke to David who also voiced concerns about Joe being a possible traitor. At the final round table the players were reminded that banished players would no longer reveal their identity. Alan Carr and Cat Burns voted for David Olusoga; David Olusoga, Nick Mohammed and Joe Marler voted for Cat Burns. Cat Burns was banished ending the show in 5th place. At the endgame, Alan explained how Joe had convinced him and Cat that they would vote for David. Nick was also suspicious that Joe’s final words to Cat were “I’m sorry”. All four players voted to Banish Again. Joe Marler voted for Alan Carr. Alan Carr, Nick Mohammed and David Olusoga voted for Joe Marler. Joe was banished ending the game in 4th place. The remaining three players unanimously voted to end the game. Nick and David revealed they were Faithfuls and Alan revealed he was a Traitor winning the game and the entire prize pot. The finalists all met by the fire pit to congratulate Alan on his victory.

== Ratings ==
Weekly ratings for each show on BBC One. All ratings are provided by BARB.

Episode	Date	Official rating (millions)	Weekly rank for BBC One	Weekly rank for all UK TV
Episode 1	8 October	12.46	1	1
Episode 2	9 October	11.87	2	2
Episode 3	15 October	13.23	1	1
Episode 4	16 October	12.85	2	2
Episode 5	22 October	13.27	2	2
Episode 6	23 October	13.61	1	1
Episode 7	29 October	13.79	2	2
Episode 8	30 October	14.10	1	1
Episode 9	6 November	14.94	1	1
Series average	2025	13.35	—N/a	—N/a

== Reception ==
=== Critical reception ===
The series received critical acclaim. It was praised for its casting of “actually recognisable names” by The Independent, with particular praise for its casting of Alan Carr with HuffPost saying that he “stole the show”. Alan Carr winning was dubbed the “TV moment of the year” by The i Paper, and one of the “most unifying cultural moments” of the century in the UK. By public demand, a wax figure of Alan Carr as a Traitor (with a green cloak and lantern) was put on display at Madame Tussauds in London.

=== Awards and nominations ===
Year	Award	Category	Result
2026	British Academy Television Awards	Memorable Moment (Alan Carr wins)	Won
2026	British Academy Television Awards	Best Reality	Won
2026	British Academy Television Awards	Best Entertainment Performance (Claudia Winkleman)	Nominated
2026	British Academy Television Craft Awards	Sound: Factual Award	Won
2026	British Academy Television Craft Awards	Entertainment Craft Team Award	Won
2026	National Television Awards	Reality Competition	Won
2026	National Television Awards	Television Presenter (Claudia Winkleman)	Shortlisted
2026	Television and Radio Industries Club Awards	Game Show	Won
2026	Television and Radio Industries Club Awards	Podcast (Uncloaked)	Nominated
2026	Royal Television Society Programme Awards	Entertainment & Reality	Won
2026	Edinburgh Television Festival Awards	Best Entertainment or Reality Series	Won
2026	Edinburgh Television Festival Awards	Best Television Presenter - Entertainment (Claudia Winkleman)	Won
2026	Rose d’Or Awards	Competition Reality	Pending
2026	Broadcast Digital Awards	Best Digital Support for a Programme	Won
2026	National Reality Television Awards	Celebrity Personality of the Year (Alan Carr)	Nominated
2026	National Reality Television Awards	Best Male Personality (Alan Carr)	Nominated
2026	National Reality Television Awards	Celebrity Personality of the Year (Tom Daley)	Nominated
2026	National Reality Television Awards	Best Reality Competition Show	Nominated
2026	National Reality Television Awards	Best New Show	Nominated
2026	National Reality Television Awards	Best Social Experiment Show	Nominated

== Home media ==
The series was officially released on DVD in region two on 4 May 2026, as a three-disc DVD box set.
