= The Celebrity Traitors =

British reality television series

- Genre: Reality; Game show
- Based on: De Verraders by: Marc Pos; Jasper Hoogendoorn
- Presented by: Claudia Winkleman
- Starring: Various contestants
- Theme music composer: Sam Watts
- Country of origin: United Kingdom
- Original language: English
- No. of series: 2
- No. of episodes: 19

Production
- Production location: Ardross, Highland
- Camera setup: Multi-camera
- Running time: 60–75 minutes
- Production company: Studio Lambert

Original release
- Network: BBC One
- Release: 8 October 2025 – present

Related
- The Traitors

The Celebrity Traitors (also known as The Celebrity Traitors UK) is a spin-off of the British version of the reality television series The Traitors. It was first broadcast on BBC One on 8 October 2025. Claudia Winkleman presents the series.

Following the premise of the parent series, the show features a group of celebrity contestants participating in a social deduction game similar to Mafia or Werewolf, set in and around Ardross Castle in Scotland. A small group of contestants is chosen as the titular "Traitors," and must work together to eliminate the other contestants to win a grand prize. The remaining contestants are the "Faithful" and are tasked to discover and banish the Traitors by voting them out to win the grand prize. The grand prize is awarded to a charity of the winner's choice.

A second series began broadcasting on 1 October 2026, every Thursday and Friday night, and it concluded on 30 October.

== Format ==
Following the format of the original version of the show, a group of celebrity contestants arrives at a castle in the Scottish Highlands where the members will remain for the duration of the game in order to win up to £100,000 for a charity of their choice. On the arrival day, host Claudia Winkleman picks a small number of contestants to be "Traitors". The rest are automatically called "Faithful". The television audience knows which players have been chosen as Traitors, but the Faithful do not know their number or identity.

At the end of each day, all contestants meet at a Round Table to discuss who they think are Traitors. They then cast votes that are revealed one by one. The person with the most votes is immediately banished, and reveals their identity before leaving. (Note: In the event of a tie, the tied players make a final plea before the remaining players vote between them again – if a second tie occurs, one player is chosen for banishment randomly among the tied players.) On most nights, the Traitors meet in private and agree to "murder" one Faithful who will leave the game immediately. The remaining Faithful players only discover who has been murdered at breakfast the next morning.

Each day, the group participates in missions to win money for the prize fund which can reach £100,000 by the end of the game. During the missions, contestants may also win a shield that awards that player immunity from being murdered that night, but not from being banished. In some cases, contestants have the right not to disclose whether they won the shield, or to inform only certain chosen players.

=== End Game ===
After the final Round Table, the remaining players (usually four) gather at the Fire of Truth and participate in the End Game. The group is given an opportunity to end the game by unanimous vote. Any vote to continue will lead to another immediate banishment vote. When a unanimous decision is reached to end the game — or when there are only two players left — the remaining players reveal whether they are Faithful or Traitors. If everyone remaining is faithful, they will split the prize fund equally among themselves. However, if any of these final players are Traitors, those players alone will share the prize fund amongst themselves for their charities.

== Production ==
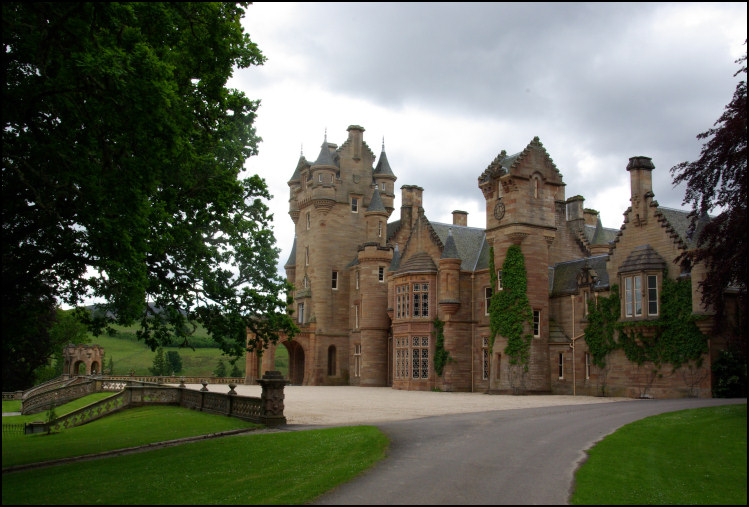
The Celebrity Traitors is filmed at Ardross.

In August 2024, the BBC confirmed that The Celebrity Traitors had been commissioned, along with two more series of The Traitors, the first of which aired in January 2025. Speaking at the Edinburgh International Television Festival, Kalpna Patel-Knight, the BBC's head of entertainment, said: "The Traitors has well and truly established itself as an unmissable highlight of the year and the news of a fourth outing, alongside a brand new celebrity version coming to the BBC, will take the series to a whole new level. In April 2025, it was confirmed that the show would air in the autumn of that year, with October 2025 later specified.

Filming for the inaugural series began on 22 April 2025 at Ardross Castle and concluded the following month, consisting of 9 episodes aired over four weeks from 8 October to 6 November 2025. Following the cast announcement, host Claudia Winkleman said "We're incredibly lucky these brilliant people have said yes. I'd love to say we'll take it easy on them, and they'll just wander round the castle and eat toast for a couple of weeks - but that would be a lie."

The first series finale was mistakenly released early on the Crave and ThreeNow streaming services in Canada and New Zealand, 24 hours before its UK broadcast on BBC One, due to a miscommunication between All3Media International and its international partners.

In March 2026, BBC announced a three-year deal that will keep The Celebrity Traitors and The Traitors in production until 2030.

== Episodes ==
=== Series overview ===
Series overview
Series	Contestants	Episodes	Originally released		Winner(s)	Prize	Traitors	Average viewers (millions)
Series	Contestants	Episodes	First released	Last released	Winner(s)	Prize	Traitors	Average viewers (millions)
1	19	9	8 October 2025	6 November 2025	Alan Carr (Traitor)	£87,500 (out of £100,000)	Alan Carr; Cat Burns; Jonathan Ross	13.35
2	21	10	1 October 2026	30 October 2026	Romesh Ranganathan; Sebastian Croft (Faithfuls)	£83,000 (out of £100,000)	Maya Jama; Richard E. Grant; James Acaster (from ep. 2); Hannah Fry (from ep. 3); King Kenny (from ep. 5)	15.39

=== Series 1 (2025) ===
No. overall	No. in series	Title	Original release date	UK viewers (millions)
1	1	"Episode 1"	8 October 2025	12.46
2	2	"Episode 2"	9 October 2025	11.87
3	3	"Episode 3"	15 October 2025	13.23
4	4	"Episode 4"	16 October 2025	12.85
5	5	"Episode 5"	22 October 2025	13.27
6	6	"Episode 6"	23 October 2025	13.61
7	7	"Episode 7"	29 October 2025	13.79
8	8	"Episode 8"	30 October 2025	14.10
9	9	"Finale"	6 November 2025	14.94

=== Series 2 (2026) ===
No. overall	No. in series	Title	Original release date	UK viewers (millions)
10	1	"Episode 1"	1 October 2026	15.41
11	2	"Episode 2"	2 October 2026	14.95
12	3	"Episode 3"	8 October 2026	15.36
13	4	"Episode 4"	9 October 2026	15.05
14	5	"Episode 5"	15 October 2026	15.29
15	6	"Episode 6"	16 October 2026	15.53
16	7	"Episode 7"	22 October 2026	15.50
17	8	"Episode 8"	23 October 2026	15.30
18	9	"Episode 9"	29 October 2026	15.54
19	10	"Finale"	30 October 2026	15.92

== The Celebrity Traitors: Uncloaked ==
The Celebrity Traitors: Uncloaked
- Also known as: Uncloaked
- Presented by: Ed Gamble
- Theme music composer: Sam Watts
- Country of origin: United Kingdom
- Original language: English
- No. of series: 2
- No. of episodes: 20

Production
- Producer: Listen
- Camera setup: Multi-camera
- Running time: 29-44 minutes
- Production company: Studio Lambert

Original release
- Network: BBC Two
- Release: 8 October – 6 November 2025
- Network: BBC One
- Release: 1 October 2026 – present

To accompany the series, a follow-up television programme and BBC Sounds podcast was included, called The Celebrity Traitors: Uncloaked, produced by Listen. The first episode aired on 8 October 2025 and is hosted by Ed Gamble. The first series aired on BBC Two with the second series moving to BBC One.

== Reception ==
=== Viewership ===
The Celebrity Traitors : UK viewers per episode (millions)

Series	Episode number										Average
Series	1	2	3	4	5	6	7	8	9	10	Average
1	12.46	11.87	13.23	12.85	13.27	13.61	13.79	14.10	14.94	–	13.35
2	15.41	14.95	15.36	15.05	15.29	15.53	15.50	15.30	15.54	15.92	15.39

Audience measurement performed by Broadcasters' Audience Research Board

=== Critical reception ===
The first series received critical acclaim. It was praised for its casting of "actually recognisable names" by The Independent, with particular praise for its casting of Alan Carr, with HuffPost saying that he "stole the show". Alan Carr winning was dubbed the "TV moment of the year" by The i Paper, and one of the "most unifying cultural moments" of the century in the UK. By public demand, a wax figure of Alan Carr as a Traitor (with a green cloak and lantern) was put on display at Madame Tussauds in London. The series was the most watched show of the year on UK television, and the series finale was the most watched UK television broadcast of 2025. It is widely considered to be one of the best television shows of the year. The series received various awards, most notably two British Academy Television Awards (including one for Alan Carr winning), two British Academy Television Craft Awards, and one National Television Award (and contributed to Alan Carr winning the National Television Award for Special Recognition in 2026).

=== Awards and nominations ===
Year	Award	Category	Result
2026	British Academy Television Awards	Memorable Moment (Alan Carr wins)	Won
2026	British Academy Television Awards	Best Reality	Won
2026	British Academy Television Awards	Best Entertainment Performance (Claudia Winkleman)	Nominated
2026	British Academy Television Craft Awards	Sound: Factual Award	Won
2026	British Academy Television Craft Awards	Entertainment Craft Team Award	Won
2026	National Television Awards	Reality Competition	Won
2026	National Television Awards	Television Presenter (Claudia Winkleman)	Shortlisted
2026	Television and Radio Industries Club Awards	Game Show	Won
2026	Television and Radio Industries Club Awards	Podcast (Uncloaked)	Nominated
2026	Royal Television Society Programme Awards	Entertainment & Reality	Won
2026	Edinburgh Television Festival Awards	Best Entertainment or Reality Series	Won
2026	Edinburgh Television Festival Awards	Best Television Presenter - Entertainment (Claudia Winkleman)	Won
2026	Rose d’Or Awards	Competition Reality	Pending
2026	Broadcast Digital Awards	Best Digital Support for a Programme	Won
2026	National Reality Television Awards	Celebrity Personality of the Year (Alan Carr)	Nominated
2026	National Reality Television Awards	Best Male Personality (Alan Carr)	Nominated
2026	National Reality Television Awards	Celebrity Personality of the Year (Tom Daley)	Nominated
2026	National Reality Television Awards	Best Reality Competition Show	Nominated
2026	National Reality Television Awards	Best New Show	Nominated
2026	National Reality Television Awards	Best Social Experiment Show	Nominated
