= Ardross Castle =

Ardross Castle may refer to the following castles in Scotland:

- Ardross Castle, Fife, a c.14th century castle ruin near Elie and Earlsferry
- Ardross Castle, Highland, a castle in Ardross
