= Action for ME =

British charity

- Type: Nonprofit
- Legal status: Charitable organisation
- Purpose: Supporting people with ME/CFS
- Headquarters: Keynsham, England
- Region served: United Kingdom
- Official language: English
- Website: www.actionforme.org.uk

Action for ME is a charitable organisation and self-help group based in the United Kingdom and registered in both England and Wales. It is dedicated to helping people with M.E., which stands for myalgic encephalomyelitis (a name used within the NHS for chronic fatigue syndrome and post-viral fatigue syndrome).

Action for ME provides information, advice and support, and to promote public education, campaigning and research into the disease.

The organisation was founded by patients in 1987 as The M.E. Action Campaign and changed its name to 'Action for M.E.' in 1993.
