= 2026 in British television =

This is a list of events in 2026 relating to television in the United Kingdom.

== Events ==
=== January ===
Date	Event
1	BBC One airs Ronan Keating & Friends: A New Year's Eve Party to welcome in 2026.
1	BBC One airs a flashforward episode of EastEnders set on New Year's Day 2027 and involving the character Max Branning (played by Jake Wood). Libby Fox (Belinda Owusu) also appears in the episode, suggesting she will make a return to EastEnders during 2026. It also features the return of Mark Fowler Jr, with the role recast to Stephen Aaron-Sipple.
2	ITV and STV have announced that the 2026 edition of Celebrity Big Brother will not air in the spring slot until 2027 due to the unorganised scheduling issues with the rival reality shows as it moves from ITV1 to ITV2. The twenty-third civilian version will continue as normal later this autumn.
4	The Floor, hosted by Welsh comedian Rob Brydon, makes its debut on ITV1 for the first time as a replacement for the twice-axed Dancing on Ice.
5	A UK-wide exclusion on junk food advertising on television before the 9pm watershed, and at anytime online, comes into force in an attempt to tackle childhood obesity.
5	Good Morning Britain begins airing from Studio 1 of ITN as it takes over production of the programme from ITV Studios, alongside new sets for ITV News bulletins and ITV News London. On the same day, Lorraine, This Morning and Loose Women are relocated to The H Club Studio in Covent Garden.
5	ITV airs Corriedale, a crossover episode featuring characters from both Coronation Street and Emmerdale.
5	Channel 5 launches a new weekday daytime schedule of six hours of continuous live talk-focused programming.
6	It is announced that former Brookside actors Philip Olivier and Suzanne Collins will join Hollyoaks, where they will reprise their roles as Timothy O'Leary and Nikki Shadwick.
7	The identity of the "secret traitor", a new feature of the latest series of The Traitors, is revealed.
7	During the evening's edition of Match of the Day, presenter Gabby Logan is replaced by Mark Chapman midway through the programme after Logan is called away because of a family emergency.
10	Canadian TV series Heated Rivalry makes its UK television debut on Sky Atlantic.
14	Former Grange Hill actor, John Alford, is jailed for eight and a half years following his conviction for sexually assaulting two teenage girls in April 2022. He would die in prison 2 months later.
14	ITV confirms that filming for Love Island: All Stars has been suspended for a number of days after the villa used for the series is evacuated due to wildfires.
17	Ant & Dec apologise over an advert for their new podcast was criticised for evoking suicide and as triggering because it showed a pair of feet dangling above the ground.
21	The BBC announces a landmark deal with YouTube that will see it produce content for the platform.
21	Prue Leith announces she will leave her role as a judge on The Great British Bake Off after a decade with the show.
23	Rachel Duffy and Stephen Libby win Series 4 of The Traitors, and share £95,750.
24	Series 1 of The Traitors Ireland makes its UK television debut on BBC One.
25	The final edition of Sky News at Ten is transmitted, ending after more than 25 years on air. It is replaced by The Wrap.
26	The first edition of a new two-hourly late evening programme on Sky News, The Wrap, is broadcast. The programme, which focuses on storytelling and debate rather than being a traditional news bulletin, includes a look at the next day's newspapers.
26	Nigella Lawson is to replace Prue Leith as a judge on The Great British Bake Off, it is announced.
27	Weather presenter Carol Kirkwood announces that she has decided to leave the BBC after 28 years with the corporation. She will present her final weather forecast on BBC Breakfast in April.
27	Author and GB News presenter Matt Goodwin is announced as the Reform UK candidate in the 2026 Gorton and Denton by-election.
28	The BBC urges producers of The Apprentice to carry out stricter background checks on its contestants after the emergence of offensive tweets posted a decade ago by Levi Hodgetts-Hague, a contestant in Series 20, after filming had finished on the series.
29	Publication of an independent review into the BBC in which the broadcaster commits to strengthening how it measures the ways audiences from different socio-economic and geographical backgrounds are portrayed and represented in its output.
30	It emerges that comedian Alan Carr inadvertently revealed he had won the first series of The Celebrity Traitors the day after filming finished.

=== February ===
Date	Event
11	ITV confirms that the 2026 The British Soap Awards will be completely cancelled.
12	The BBC announces 10% of cost cuts in the face of financial pressures.
14	Sugababes singer Keisha Buchanan wins the seventh series of The Masked Singer as "Moth".
14	EastEnders producers confirm that Ross Kemp will briefly reprise his role as Grant Mitchell for two major storylines later in the year.
15	BBC Two airs a special edition of Newsnight in which Gisèle Pelicot speaks about the aftermath of her former husband's trial.
17	Channel 5's coverage of snooker expands as it begins to show the Players Championship. Channel 5 will also broadcast the Tour Championship and the British Open.
17	The electronic music and YouTube content creator Look Mum No Computer is chosen to represent the United Kingdom at the 2026 Eurovision Song Contest.
19	The BBC confirms it will celebrate Sir David Attenborough's 100th birthday on 8 May with a week of programming, including three special programmes about the presenter and wildlife expert.
19	Ofcom updates its electoral guidelines for broadcasters ahead of May's local elections.
19	Former Coronation Street actress Beverley Callard makes her debut in Irish soap Fair City.
20	At a hearing at Southwark Crown Court, seven reality stars and influencers from The Only Way Is Essex and Love Island plead guilty to illegally promoting foreign exchange trading on Instagram. Those involved in the case are Lauren Goodger, Yazmin Oukhellou, Rebecca Gormley, Biggs Chris, Jamie Clayton, Scott Timlin, and Eva Zapico.
21	EastEnders announces that Gemma Bissix will reprise her role of Clare Bates in the soap opera after 18 years, for a short stint as part of a dementia storyline involving Clare's stepfather, Nigel Bates (Paul Bradley).
21	ITV confirms that the revived edition of You Bet! has been axed again after just two series.
22	The 79th British Academy Film Awards are broadcast on BBC One. During the ceremony, Tourette syndrome activist John Davidson (the subject of the biographical drama I Swear, a film nominated for five BAFTAs) has several tic-related outbursts, including screaming a racial slur at black actors Michael B. Jordan and Delroy Lindo while they are presenting the category of Best Special Visual Effects. This later prompts ceremony host Alan Cumming to apologise for any strong language heard throughout the broadcast, though he thanks the audience for their "understanding" of Tourette's. The BBC apologises the following day for not editing Davidson's outburst during the delayed broadcast.
24	BBC content director Kate Phillips confirms that a second racial slur that occurred during the BAFTA Film Awards was edited out of the broadcast.
24	Sky One returns after a 4.5 year absence. It replaces Sky Max. Sky Showcase, which had been used as a shop window for the entire Sky portfolio, also closes on this day.
25	The BBC launches an investigation into its coverage of the BAFTA Awards.

=== March ===
Date	Event
3	Richard Osman announces that he will relinquish or abandon his role as presenter of the quiz Richard Osman's House of Games after nine years, handing the role on to someone else.
6	The BBC says the broadcast of a racial slur during the BAFTA Awards was a "genuine mistake" but that it is looking into why the footage is still available on BBC iPlayer.
6	BBC News launches a temporary programme nightly at 18:30 The Iran War Today to cover the days events in the 2026 Iran War.
11	The BBC confirms its gay dating show I Kissed a Boy has been axed after two series. Its sister show, I Kissed a Girl, is renewed for a second and final series, which airs in June. The decision is criticised by the general public, who deem it a step back for LGBTQ+ portrayal in the media.
13	The BBC announces that two missing episodes of the Doctor Who serial "The Daleks' Master Plan" have been found in a private collection. Restored versions of the two episodes are scheduled to be released on BBC iPlayer during Easter.
13	Channel 4 announces that Clare Balding will continue to present The Boat Race after they took over the rights from the BBC. She will be joined by Ade Adepitan with commentary from the channel's F1 lead commentator Alex Jacques.
13	The Claudia Winkleman Show makes its debut on BBC One, with Jeff Goldblum, Vanessa Williams, Jennifer Saunders and Tom Allen appearing in the opening episode.
16	It is announced that Michael Sheen will replace Richard Osman as presenter of BBC Two's House of Games.
17	Tina Fey, Jamie Dornan and Riz Ahmed are named as the first three hosts of the new UK version of Saturday Night Live.
20	The Red Nose Day 2026 telethon on BBC One raises £30m for charity.
21	The UK version of Saturday Night Live launches on Sky One.
21	Karen Hauer, Strictly Come Dancing's longest-serving professional dancer, quits the show after 14 years.
23	BBC presenter Louise Minchin is taken to hospital after contracting frostbite during an Arctic adventure challenge in Canada to raise money for the Duke of Edinburgh Award.
24	The Sun reports that a segment of BBC One's The Repair Shop featuring the restoration of a Bob Monkhouse joke book was dropped because the jokes were deemed to be inappropriate.
25	Former Google executive Matt Brittin is confirmed as the new Director-General of the BBC, replacing Tim Davie.
26	Launch of HBO Max in the UK, which will include Friends as part of its streaming content, meaning the series is once again available to watch in the UK.
26	Gareth Baty wins the 2026 series of MasterChef: The Professionals.
28	Emily Bell and Josh McDonald win Series 3 of the Gladiators reboot.
31	Launch of Sky and Disney's Disney+ Cinema, which will include films from the film studio's library along with the streaming service becoming available on Sky's pay-TV services as part of a multi-year agreement between the two companies.
31	The BBC confirms it is to air a two-part drama about the murder of Sarah Everard.

=== April ===
Date	Event
1	The annual cost of a television licence in the UK increases by £5.50 to £180.
1	Virgin Media adds Sky Atlantic to their channel lineup under a new deal with Sky.
1	Carol Kirkwood works her final shift as a BBC weather presenter.
2	Tim Davie departs his role as Director-General of the BBC, five months after announcing his resignation.
2	Tyler West is announced as the replacement for Scott Mills on the new video podcast Race Across the World: The Detour, when it launches this evening following the sacking of Mills after historic allegations of serious sexual offences.
3	Rhodri Talfan Davies becomes Acting BBC Director General following the departure of Tim Davie.
4	Channel 4 broadcasts the University Boat Race for the first time, replacing the BBC which, apart from in the late 2000s and 2020, had broadcast the event since 1938.
6	I'm a Celebrity... South Africa returns for a second series, pre-recorded in September 2025 and featuring returning campmates including Gemma Collins, Harry Redknapp, Mo Farah and Sinitta.
8	The BBC's executive complaints unit rules that the broadcast of a racial slur during the BAFTA Awards breached the BBC's editorial standards.
8	Channel 4 pulls a celebrity edition of The Great British Bake Off that included Scott Mills as a contestant from its schedule.
10	An independent review finds that BAFTA fell short in its duty of care to guests, members and viewers over the racial slur incident, but that there was no malicious intent.
10	The CITV brand airs on a linear channel for the final time when the last CITV block is aired on ITV2.
11	GB News announces that its presenter, Eamonn Holmes, is in hospital following a stroke.
15	The BBC announces plans to cut between 1,500 and 2,000 jobs as part of plans to save £500m.
16	Karishma Vijay wins Series 20 of The Apprentice.
17	The 22nd British Academy Games Awards are held in London, and hosted by YouTuber Elz the Witch. The roleplay game Clair Obscur: Expedition 33 is named best game at the event.
20	The children's TV programme Balamory returns to CBeebies for a new series over two decades after it was originally aired.
20	Diane Howe, a housewife and carer from Lancashire, is named 2026 Mastermind Champion after a tie-breaker in which she won by one point. It is only the second time a Grand Final has ended with a tie-breaker in the series' history.
20	The 2025–26 series of University Challenge is won by the University of Manchester.
21	Actress Beverley Callard is seen on screen exiting series 2 of I'm a Celebrity... South Africa after collapsing on set. The show was recorded in September 2025, prior to her diagnosis of breast cancer.
23	BBC Sport confirms that Football Focus will end after 52 years, with the last edition to be shown at the end of the 2025–26 football season.
23	Despite the absence of Celebrity Big Brother this year, ITV confirms that the civilian version of Big Brother will run for eight weeks this autumn and it will be Big Brother's longest series to air this year following the reality show's relaunch on ITV2 in October 2023.
24	Jamie Bigg, known as Giant, announced he will not be returning for the fourth series of Gladiators.
24	Adam Thomas wins the second series of I'm a Celebrity... South Africa. The live final features a row between contestants, requiring presenters Ant & Dec to raise their voices in an attempt to restore order, while Sinitta and Gemma Collins walk off stage as a result of the argument.
25	The cast and crew of BBC One Scotland's soap River City film the series' final scenes after 24 years on air.
26	Retired IT analyst Roman Dubowski becomes the seventh person to win the £1,000,000 jackpot on Who Wants to Be a Millionaire?.
26	Hollywood actor Hans Obma is to join the cast of Welsh soap Pobol y Cwm after learning to speak the Welsh language.

=== May ===
Date	Event
3	BBC One broadcasts the last of the five-part nature series Secret Garden narrated by David Attenborough five days before Attenborough's 100th birthday.
6	Strictly Come Dancing confirms that professional dancers Karen Hauer, Gorka Marquez, Nadiya Bychkova, Luba Mushtuk and Michelle Tsiakkas have all left the series.
8	Journalists and some technical staff at STV are scheduled to stage a 24-hour strike over a pay freeze.
10	The 2026 BAFTA Television Awards are held at the Royal Festival Hall in London, hosted by comedian Greg Davies. Netflix series Adolescence breaks the record for most wins in a single night, scooping four awards.
14	ITV announce that Patsy Kensit is returning to Emmerdale, reprising her role as Sadie King after twenty years away.
16	Dara wins the 2026 Eurovision Song Contest for Bulgaria with the song "Bangaranga", while the UK entry, "Eins, Zwei, Drei" by Look Mum No Computer, finishes in 25th and last place with only 1 point.
18	Two female contestants on Married at First Sight UK allege that they were raped by their on-screen husbands during filming, with a third claiming she had experienced sexual misconduct by her on-screen husband. Channel 4 subsequently removes all episodes of the show from their linear and streaming services.
19	The BBC announces that Johannes Radebe, Josh Widdicombe and Emma Willis will be the new hosts of Strictly Come Dancing, replacing Tess Daly and Claudia Winkleman.
21	Kush Burman and Jo Diop win series 6 of Race Across the World.
21	Airline TUI ends its sponsorship of the British, Australian and American versions of Married At First Sight.
24	Football Focus ends after 52 years. The final edition is shown on BBC One at the end of the 2025–26 football season.
24	A Kids Special edition of The 1% Club is broadcast on ITV.
27	BBC News wins a News and Documentary Emmy Award for its coverage of the 2025 Myanmar earthquake.
28	Following the revival of Balamory the previous month garnering 1.5 million viewers, the BBC announce that a third and fourth series have been ordered. The revival was initially ordered for two series.
30	For the first time, the UEFA Champions League final is not available free-to-air after TNT Sports decides not to allow free access to it, and to the other two European cup finals, despite all three featuring English teams. The games are instead available on HBO Max, which is provided at no extra cost to most Sky customers, and Virgin Media customers are able to view them via a pop-up channel. Highlights of the Champions League final will be shown on the BBC.
30	The Hawkstone Farmers Choir, which was initially put together by Jeremy Clarkson, wins series 19 of Britain's Got Talent.

=== June ===
Date	Event
1	The thirteenth series of Love Island begins airing on ITV2, hosted by Maya Jama. It is followed by the debut of a new vodcast, Love Island: The Debrief, hosted by former contestants Toni Laites, Shakira Khan and Yasmin Pettet.
1	Ofcom approves STV's plan to axe its separate news programme for the north of Scotland.
1	Kamaal Busari wins the first series of Nobody's Fool.
3	Giorgio Locatelli is announced as the new judge on Celebrity MasterChef following the departure of John Torode.
4	During an edition of the BBC's Question Time, Andy Burnham confirms that he would seek to enter any future Labour Party leadership election if elected to Parliament.
5	Jon Snow, lead presenter of Channel 4 News for 32 years, reveals he has been diagnosed with Alzheimer's disease.
10	The BBC confirms that Doctor Who is to be put out to tender after parting ways with production company Bad Wolf and showrunner Russell T Davies. As a result, the previously announced special, which was set to air at Christmas 2026, will no longer go ahead. It is reported that the series will be off-air until 2028 at the earliest.
10	Lacey Turner is confirmed as the first contestant for the twenty-fourth series of Strictly Come Dancing.
11	Following her withdrawal from Strictly Come Dancing the previous year due to an ankle injury before the series began, Dani Dyer is announced to be returning as a contestant for the twenty-fourth series.
12	Sir Ian Cheshire is appointed Chair of Ofcom.
12	Delta Goodrem is announced as the third contestant in series twenty-four of Strictly Come Dancing.
17	Jeremy Clarkson reveals he has been diagnosed with prostate cancer in an episode of his series Clarkson's Farm.
17	BBC Three presenter and former footballer Ashley Cain is accused of making sexist and misogynistic comments in historical social media posts.
18	BBC Three says it has no plans to air the second series of Ashley Cain Into the Danger Zone following allegations made against the former footballer.
21	Jeremy Clarkson reveals he is remission from prostate cancer.
21	It is reported that ITV is to axe The British Soap Awards.
23	Former River City actor Iain Robertson is convicted of raping a woman and assaulting two others.
24	It is announced that the Edinburgh Television Festival will be relocating to Manchester from 2027 as a result of increasing costs and accessibility issues around holding the event in Edinburgh.
24	The BBC agrees a deal with UEFA to continue showing UEFA match fixtures for Scotland, Wales and Northern Ireland free-to-air until June 2028.
24	It is announced that plans are underway for a Christmas special of the TV series The Other Bennet Sister.
30	Sir Damon Buffini will step down as Deputy Chair of the BBC Board and Chair of the Commercial Board.

=== July ===
Date	Event
6	BBC One broadcasts England's World Cup match against Mexico, with provisional viewing figures giving the game a peak audience of 9.1m.
6	Sky Group announces it will acquire, subject to regulatory approval, ITV plc's media and entertainment division, including its networks and related streaming services, in a £1.6bn deal.
10	STV broadcasts the final edition of News at Six for northern Scotland from its Aberdeen studios ahead of changes to its news output.
11	Michelle Ryan will be departing her role as Zoe Slater in the BBC soap opera EastEnders once again, just one year after her return following a 20 year hiatus. It is reported that Ryan's decision to exit the role came after she was refused time-off from filming commitments with the serial, and that Zoe would be killed off later in the year.
15	BBC One broadcasts England's World Cup semi-final match against Argentina, with England losing to the Argentinians by 2–1. The match is seen by a peak audience of 24m, while averaging an audience of 22.1m.
16	It is reported that Claudia Winkleman has quit her eponymous chat show after one series.
17	Broadcaster and television presenter Lauren Laverne reveals she has been diagnosed with the blood and bone disorder smouldering myeloma, which can develop into blood cancer, but says she does not presently need treatment.
20	Ofcom launches an investigation into Married at First Sight UK following a complaint regarding "fairness and privacy".
20	Tom Stoltman, a three-time World's Strongest Man champion, joins the cast of Gladiators.
23	TNT Sports will broadcast the 2026 Commonwealth Games in Glasgow for the first time and Channel 5 will air highlights of the same event. They replace the BBC who opted to cease their coverage of the event after airing the Commonwealth Games since 1954.
23	Former Coronation Street actor Qasim Akhtar is awarded damages at the High Court of Justice in a libel case against The Sun.
23	Former River City actor Iain Robertson is sentenced to nine years in prison after he was previously convicted of rape and assault.
27	Actress Tricia Penrose, who played barmaid Gina Ward in Heartbeat, announces she has become co-owner of the Goathland Hotel, the North Yorkshire pub that was used for filming scenes set in the fictional Aidensfield Arms.
28	Naga Munchetty announces she is leaving BBC Breakfast to take up a presenting role on BBC Radio 5 Live Breakfast.
29	The BBC announce that as part of cost-cutting measures, they have cancelled Blankety Blank, Celebrity Mastermind and Live at the Apollo. The latter two will air for one more series, respectively, while Blankety Blank host Bradley Walsh was too busy with other projects to film another series. The civilian version of Mastermind will continue as normal.

=== August ===
Date	Event
4	Casting has been announced for the upcoming Agatha Christie prequel titled Hercule which is co-produced by the BBC and Mammoth Screen. The 6-part prequel, set in London during the interwar years, will air sometime in 2027. Edward Bluemel will portray the younger version of the iconic Belgian detective. Alongside Bluemel, Henry Ashton, James D'Arcy, Calvin Demba, Phil Dunning, Jack Gleeson, Tamsin Greig, James Nesbitt, Guy Remmers, Rebecca Rittenhouse and Mawaan Rizwan have all joined the casting line-up.
8	It is reported that Strictly Come Dancing professional dancers James and Ola Jordan have separated after 23 years.
9	Kellie Bright announces she will be departing her role of Linda Carter in the BBC soap opera EastEnders after 13 years.
10–14	The One Show celebrates its 20th anniversary with a week of special programmes, culminating in an hour-long special on 14 August.
11	Actress Lucy Davis, who played Dawn Tinsley in The Office, reveals she has "incurable" breast cancer.
12	Gavin & Stacey actress Melanie Walters completes the line up for Series 24 of Strictly Come Dancing.
17
17	Robert Kazinsky is to reprise his role of Sean Slater in the BBC soap opera EastEnders on a permanent basis for the first time in 17 years, following guest stints in 2019, 2021 and 2022 respectively.
18	For the first time in the history of the National Television Awards, voters select an all-female shortlist in the best drama performance category.
18	Premier Sports will be the exclusive broadcaster of the 2026 Rugby League World Cup coverage in Australia, New Zealand and Papua New Guinea for the first time since the BBC has relinquished its free-to-air television broadcasting rights. The coverage will be later this October and cover men's, women's and wheelchair tournaments.
21	Ofcom launches an investigation into Sky News over claims of harassment made by Nigel Farage concerning his family.
26	ITV announces GK Barry and former Big Brother winner Kate Lawler will front a new vodcast companion show titled Big Brother: The Group Chat to accompany the twenty-third series. It is also reported they have axed the Big Brother: Live Stream ahead of this series.
27	The BBC confirms that Top Gear will return four years after its last series aired, with a presenting line-up to be confirmed later.
31	BBC One Scotland airs the final episode of its soap, River City.

=== September ===
Date	Event
1	The BBC announces that its winter sports programme, Ski Sunday, will finish after 50 years.
3	RuPaul's Drag Race UK returns for its eighth series.
5	Casualty celebrates its 40th anniversary with a two episode special featuring an explosion. It extends its record as the longest-running medical drama series in the world.
6	BBC News presenter Maryam Moshiri reveals she has been diagnosed with blood cancer.
8	The 31st National Television Awards are held at the O2 Arena in London.
8	Monty Don announces he will step down as presenter of Gardeners' World at the end of the 2026 series, with his final episode airing on 30 October after 23 years. A replacement lead presenter for Monty Don is yet to be announced ahead of the next series in March 2027.
8	Following reports Sir Tom Jones will not return as a judge on the next series of The Voice UK, the singer says he was "fired" by ITV and did not want to leave.
9	Channel 4 announces plans to shed 340 jobs by the end of the year following a strategic review.
9	It is confirmed that RuPaul's Drag Race UK will leave BBC Three after the eighth series, and will air via the WOW Presents Plus streaming service.
10	Zoe Slater, a character in the BBC soap opera EastEnders portrayed by Michelle Ryan, dies after sustaining a head injury and is found dead in bed by her on-screen mother Kat (Jessie Wallace).
11	It is confirmed that Alesha Dixon and Stacey Solomon will present a revamped version of The Voice UK, while Cheryl and Aitch will join the judging panel.
13	Big Brother returns for its twenty-third series and it will be the longest civilian series to air on ITV2 since its relaunch in October 2023.
15	Gemma Collins' new documentary series Gemma Collins: Everything. All At Once. begins airing on Sky One. The series follows Collins and her family, as she embarks on IVF treatment and plans her upcoming nuptials after her engagement to Rami Hawash, as well as documenting her personal life and struggles.
18	The Friday edition of Newsnight moves to the earlier time of 7pm.
19	Strictly Come Dancing returns for its twenty-fourth series on BBC One with a launch show. It is the first series to be presented by new hosts Emma Willis, Josh Widdicombe and Johannes Radebe, with the couples being paired up in the studio for the first time since 2019.
20	BBC Breakfast is broadcast on a Sunday for the final time.
21	The BBC removes eleven comedy sketches from That Mitchell and Webb Look from BBC iPlayer after deciding they no longer "work today".
22	BBC Wales Today weather presenter Derek Brockway confirms he will leave the programme after 30 years, with his final broadcast being at the end of the year.
25	BBC Director-General Matt Brittin says that some BBC radio and television channels may have to close as the broadcaster seeks to make £500m in savings.
25	Garmon Rhys, the interim director of BBC Cymru Wales, confirms that 58 jobs will be cut as part of wider cost-saving measures across the BBC.
25	The BBC upholds several complaints about the broadcast of the c-word during an edition of Have I Got News for You that aired on 7 November 2025.
26	The Metropolitan Police announces that it is re-examining CCTV footage from the case of the 1999 murder of television presenter Jill Dando.
27	Following the previous week's final Sunday edition of BBC Breakfast, the BBC News Channel now airs in its place.
30	GB News appoints Tom Harwood as its US Political Editor.

=== October ===
Date	Event
1	The Celebrity Traitors returns for a second series.
2	This Morning presenter Alison Hammond leaves midway through an edition of the programme to attend hospital for a heart check up, but later confirms she is fine.
15	The BBC News channel is made available to stream live on YouTube in the United Kingdom and United States.
20	It is announced that BBC Three and the BBC Scotland TV channel are to close as linear services in Spring 2027, and become online services as the BBC makes £500m of savings.
23	Prince William makes a surprise appearance on The Graham Norton Show as part of a special edition celebrating the Earthshot Prize.
23	Prime Minister Andy Burnham and Mayor of Liverpool City Region Steve Rotheram appear on an edition of Celebrity Gogglebox in aid of Stand Up to Cancer.
23	BBC Look East presenter Susie Fowler-Watt announces she is leaving the BBC after 35 years in order to begin a new career as a psychotherapist.
26	Ian Puleston-Davies is to reprise his role as Owen Armstrong in Coronation Street.
30	Romesh Ranganathan and Sebastian Croft win the second series of The Celebrity Traitors, splitting a total prize pot of £83,000 between their charities, Refugee Council and Choose Love, respectively.
31	Cate McHugh wins the 2026 series of The Voice UK.

=== November ===
Date	Event
4	ITV apologises after a power cut in Central London overnight forces the cancellation of the day's live episodes of Lorraine, This Morning and Loose Women.
5	Flesh is named the winner of the eighth series of RuPaul's Drag Race UK.
5	Channel 4 confirms that Married At First Sight UK will not return following a BBC investigation into the programme.
5	Rochelle Rackham is announced as the winner of the twenty-third series of Big Brother.
6	Monty Don presents his final edition of Gardeners' World at his home in Longmeadow after 23 years.
8	Maya Jama announces she is stepping down as presenter of Love Island after three years in the role.
10	The BBC removes Little Britain from its iPlayer and is reviewing other content featuring David Walliams following allegations about his personal conduct.
10	ITV Cymru Wales announces plans to axe its Coast and Country and Backstage programmes, as well as reducing the number of production staff, in order to cut costs.
11	S4C confirms a three-part drama about a paedophile head teacher who was sentenced to 17 years in prison in 2024 will not go ahead after deciding to do so would "not be appropriate".
12	The 11th Royal Television Society Northern Ireland Awards are held in Belfast.
17	While appearing as a contestant on I'm a Celebrity...Get Me Out of Here!, the actress Joanna Page alleges that an unnamed male actor made "really inappropriate" and "awful" comments to her while on set.
22	The BBC apologises for any offence caused to its viewers after a recording of sex noises was heard as judge Motsi Mabuse gave feedback during the previous evening's Blackpool week edition of Strictly Come Dancing.
29	BBC One airs the documentary Heal in which Catherine, Princess of Wales speaks candidly about her cancer diagnosis and treatment.

=== December ===
Date	Event
25	Star Wars: A New Hope, dubbed into Welsh for the first time and called Star Wars: Gobaith Newydd, will be broadcast on S4C.

== Debuts ==
=== BBC ===
Date	Debut	Channel
1 January	Wild London	BBC One
1 January	Shedites	BBC One
3 January	Waiting for the Out	BBC One
5 January	Lynley	BBC One
5 January	Lucy Worsley's Victorian Murder Club	BBC Two
7 January	Can You Keep a Secret?	BBC One
26 January	Clive Myrie's African Adventure	BBC Two
26 January	One Life	BBC Two
8 February	Lord of the Flies	BBC One
9 February	Small Prophets	BBC Two
16 February	Duck & Frog	CBBC
16 February	Rafi the Wishing Wizard	CBeebies
23 February	Do You Know Your Place?	BBC Two
4 March	Girl Troop vs Aliens	CBBC
13 March	The Claudia Winkleman Show	BBC One
15 March	The Other Bennet Sister	BBC One
22 March	Crookhaven	BBC One
30 March	Babies	BBC One
2 April	Race Across The World:The Detour	BBC iPlayer
5 April	Secret Garden	BBC One
7 April	I Made It at Market	BBC One
8 April	Twenty Twenty Six	BBC Two
11 April	Proper Ladies	BBC Three
13 April	Great Japanese Railway Journeys	BBC Two
16 April	The Doghouse	BBC Three
20 April	Mint	BBC One
20 April	The Lady Grace Mysteries	CBBC
24 April	Half Man	BBC One
26 April	The Cage	BBC One
4 May	Tiny Tunes	CBeebies
4 May	Great Korean Railway Journeys	BBC Two
11 May	Great Central Asian Railway Journeys	BBC Two
23 May	Two Weeks in August	BBC One
24 May	Dear England	BBC One
7 June	Tiger Island	BBC One
13 July	Evolution	BBC Two
17 July	The Hairdresser Mysteries	BBC One
17 July	Ann Droid	BBC One
26 July	The Rapture	BBC One
13 August	The Big Deal with Steph McGovern	BBC Two
17 August	Race Against the Tide	BBC Scotland
18 August	Emergency 24/7	BBC Two
19 September	Wisdom of the Crowd	BBC One
20 September	The Split Up	BBC One
26 September	Marble Hall Murders	BBC One
4 October	The Reluctant Vampire	BBC One
23 October	The Northumbria Mysteries	BBC One
1 November	Blue Planet III	BBC One
5 November	Rise of the Rockstar Chef	BBC Two
6 November	Naturewatch	BBC Two
12 November	Cunk on Cinema	BBC Two
14 November	Honey	BBC One
20 November	Bill's Included	BBC One
22 November	The Witch Farm	BBC One
23 November	Lucy Worsley's Keys to the Castle	BBC Two
25 December	Call the Midwife: Sisters in Arms	BBC One
TBA	California Avenue	BBC One
TBA	The Dream Lands	BBC One
TBA	First Day on Earth	BBC One
TBA	Push	BBC One
TBA	Shuggie Bain	BBC One
TBA	A Tale of Two Cities	BBC One
TBA	We Go Again	BBC Three
TBA	Counsels	BBC Scotland
TBA	Late in Life	TBA
TBA	Wahala	TBA

=== ITV ===
Date	Debut	Channel
1 January	Time is Money	ITV1
4 January	The Floor	ITV1
5 January	Corriedale	ITV1
6 January	Millionaire Hot Seat	ITV1
8 February	Betrayal	ITV1
10 February	The Summit	ITV1
22 February	The Lady	ITVX
24 February	The Heat	ITV2
8 March	Gone	ITVX
21 March	Celebrity Sabotage	ITV1
7 April	A Taste for Murder	ITVX
24 April	The Neighbourhood	ITV1
27 April	Secret Service	ITVX
10 May	Believe Me	ITVX
23 May	Nobody's Fool	ITV1
1 June	Love Island: The Debrief	ITV2
12 July	The Dark	ITVX
16 July	The Chase Around the World	ITV1
26 July	Force of Nature	ITV1
5 September	The Box	ITV1
13 September	Big Brother: The Group Chat	ITV2
20 September	The Blame	ITVX
30 September	Winter	ITVX
11 October	The Party	ITVX
18 October	Undercover: A Year in Reform	ITV1
25 October	Adultery	ITV1
TBA	Saviour	ITVX

=== Channel 4 ===
Date	Debut	Channel
6 January	What Not to Eat	Channel 4
16 January	David Baddiel: Cat Man	Channel 4
1 February	Secret Genius	Channel 4
23 February	Dirty Business	Channel 4
2 March	Handcuffed: Last Pair Standing	Channel 4
11 March	A Woman of Substance	Channel 4
22 March	The Hunt: Prey vs Predator	Channel 4
12 April	Your Song	Channel 4
4 May	Escape to Florida	Channel 4
19 May	Falling	Channel 4
28 May	Make That Movie	Channel 4
31 May	Tip Toe	Channel 4
20 July	Secret Lives of Gypsy Wives	Channel 4
4 September	Live From The Lycett Arms	Channel 4
13 September	Apocalypse	Channel 4
22 September	The Great British British Bake Off: Second Helpings	Channel 4
1 October	Break Clause	Channel 4
5 October	Pierre	Channel 4
22 October	It Gets Worse	Channel 4
1 November	Bradley Walsh's Million Pound Shot	Channel 4
11 November	Hunting Alice Bell	Channel 4
2 December	Careless	Channel 4
TBA	Army of Shadows	Channel 4
TBA	Complicit	Channel 4
TBA	Deadpoint	Channel 4
TBA	Maya	Channel 4
TBA	Number 10	Channel 4
TBA	Schooled	Channel 4
TBA	Stepping Up	Channel 4
TBA	Up to No Good	Channel 4
TBA	Your Time Starts Now	Channel 4

=== 5 ===
Date	Debut	Channel
24 March	Power: The Downfall of Huw Edwards	5
13 April	Missed Call	5
4 May	Number One Fan	5
2 June	The Fortune	5
30 July	Benidorm Is Murder	5
14 September	Forever Home	5
28 September	Michael Palin in the Philippines	5

=== Sky ===
Date	Debut	Channel
26 January	The Wrap	Sky News
30 January	Under Salt Marsh	Sky Atlantic
24 February	The Dyers' Caravan Park	Sky One
21 March	Saturday Night Live UK	Sky One
30 April	Prisoner	Sky Atlantic
8 July	Katie Price: Nothing to Hide	Sky Documentaries
6 August	Possession	Sky Atlantic
27 August	Fightland	Sky Atlantic
15 September	Gemma Collins: Everything. All At Once.	Sky One
21 September	The Wargame	Sky One
2 October	War	Sky Atlantic
TBA	Force & Majeure	Sky One

=== Other platforms ===
Date	Debut	Channel
1 January	Run Away	Netflix
8 January	Girl Taken	Paramount+
15 January	Agatha Christie's Seven Dials	Netflix
21 January	Steal	Amazon Prime Video
12 February	How to Get to Heaven from Belfast	Netflix
4 March	Young Sherlock	Amazon Prime Video
25 March	Bait	Amazon Prime Video
12 April	Zero Stars	TLC
21 April	Unchosen	Netflix
7 May	Legends	Netflix
12 May	The Way Out	U&Dave
4 June	The Witness	Netflix
8 June	Alice and Steve	Disney+
5 July	Ed Gamble's Unacceptable!	TLC
7 August	Alley Cats	Netflix
13 August	Hit Point	U&Dave
13 September	Wagging Rights	U&Dave/U&W
15 September	Agatha Christie's Tommy & Tuppence	BritBox
2 October	Kill Jackie	Amazon Prime Video
12 October	Treasure Island	Paramount+
3 December	Pride and Prejudice	Netflix
8 December	Maigret	U&Drama/U
31 December	The Day	Paramount+
TBA	The Husbands	Apple TV
TBA	Prodigies	Apple TV
TBA	The Wanted Man	Apple TV
TBA	Marlow	BritBox
TBA	Mosquito	Disney+
TBA	Blackmere	Netflix
TBA	The Twin	Netflix
TBA	The Christie Affair	TBA
TBA	Wavewalker: Breaking Free	TBA

== Channels and streaming services ==
=== New channels/streaming services ===
Date	Channel
24 February	Sky One (relaunch)
17 March	Disney+ Cinema
26 March	HBO Max
21 October	5Drama

=== Defunct channels/streaming services ===
Date	Channel
1 January
1 January	Pop (Linear only)
1 January	Tiny Pop (Linear only)
13 January	HGTV
24 February	Sky Showcase
24 February	Sky Max
10 April	CITV (as a strand)
21 October	5Select

=== Rebranding channels/streaming services ===
Date	Old name	New name
29 September	Sky History 2	MysteryX

== Television programmes ==
=== Changes of network affiliation ===
Programme	Moved from	Moved to
The Boat Race	BBC One	Channel 4
Peaky Blinders	BBC One	Netflix
Harley Quinn	E4	HBO Max
Rick and Morty	E4	HBO Max
Robot Chicken	Channel 4	HBO Max
Primal	Channel 4	HBO Max
My Adventures with Superman	Channel 4	HBO Max
All TNT Sports programming	Discovery+	HBO Max
Georgie & Mandy’s First Marriage	TLC	HBO Max
The Comeback	Sky Atlantic	Sky Comedy
Condor	Universal TV	Sky One
The Terror	AMC Global	BBC Two
The Commonwealth Games	BBC One & BBC Two	5 & TNT Sports

=== Returning this year after a break of one year or longer ===
Programme	Date(s) of original removal	Original channel(s)	Date of return	New channel(s)
The Night Manager	27 March 2016	BBC One	1 January 2026	N/A (same channel as original)
Dickinson's Real Deal	1 February 2024	ITV1	5 January 2026	N/A (same channel as original)
RuPaul's Drag Race: UK vs. the World	8 March 2022; 29 March 2024	BBC Three	27 January 2026	N/A (same channel as original)
Mock the Week	4 November 2022	BBC Two	1 February 2026	TLC
Celebrity Lingo	19 November 2022	ITV1	25 February 2026	N/A (same channel as original)
I'm a Celebrity... South Africa	12 May 2023	ITV1	6 April 2026	N/A (same channel as original)
Big Mood	28 March 2024	Channel 4	16 April 2026	N/A (same channel as original)
Balamory	29 June 2005	CBeebies	20 April 2026	N/A (same channel as original)
A Good Girl's Guide to Murder	12 July 2024	BBC Three	27 May 2026	Now co-produced by Netflix
Van der Valk	21 November 1977; 19 February 1992; 10 May 2020; 2 July 2023	ITV1	2 August 2026	N/A (same channel as original)
One Born Every Minute	9 May 2018	Channel 4	25 October 2026	E4
Big Break	9 October 2002	BBC One	TBD in November or December 2026	BBC Two

== Continuing television programmes ==
=== 1920s ===
Programme	Date
BBC Wimbledon	1927–1939, 1946–2019, 2021–present

=== 1930s ===
Programme	Date
Trooping the Colour	1937–1939, 1946–2019, 2023–present
Boat Race	1938–1939, 1946–2019, 2021–present
BBC Cricket	1939, 1946–1999, 2020–present

=== 1950s ===
Programme	Date
Panorama	1953–present
Eurovision Song Contest	1956–2019, 2021–present
The Sky at Night	1957–present
Final Score	1958–present
Blue Peter	1958–present

=== 1960s ===
Programme	Date
Coronation Street	1960–present
Points of View	1961–present
Songs of Praise	1961–present
University Challenge	1962–1987, 1994–present
Horizon	1964–present
Match of the Day	1964–present
Top of the Pops	1964–2006, 2006–present
ITV Racing	1966–1985, 2017–present

=== 1970s ===
Programme	Date
Emmerdale	1972–present
Mastermind (including Celebrity Mastermind)	1972–1997, 2003–present
Arena	1975–present
BBC Snooker	1975–present
Blankety Blank	1979–1990, 1997–2002, 2016, 2020–2026
Antiques Roadshow	1979–present
Question Time	1979–present

=== 1980s ===
Programme	Date
BBC Children in Need	1980–present
Bullseye	1981–1995, 2006, 2024–present
Countdown	1982–present
EastEnders	1985–present
Comic Relief	1985–present
Catchphrase	1986–2002, 2013–present
Casualty	1986-2027
This Morning	1988–present
Countryfile	1988–present
Wheel of Fortune	1988–2001, 2024–present
Home and Away	1989–2000, 2001–present

=== 1990s ===
Programme	Date
Have I Got News for You	1990–present
MasterChef	1990–2001, 2005–present
Gladiators	1992–2000, 2008–2009, 2024–present
ITV News Meridian	1993–present
National Television Awards	1995–2008, 2010–present
Hollyoaks	1995–present
Silent Witness	1996–2027
Classic Coronation Street	1996–2004, 2017–present
Midsomer Murders	1997–present
Classic Emmerdale	1998–2004, 2019–present
Who Wants to Be a Millionaire?	1998–2014, 2018–present
Loose Women	1999–present

=== 2000s ===
Programme	Date
Bargain Hunt	2000–present
BBC Breakfast	2000–present
The Weakest Link	2000–2012, 2017, 2021–present
Big Brother	2000–2018, 2023–present
Unreported World	2000–present
Balamory	2002–2005, 2026–present
Escape to the Country	2002–present
I'm a Celebrity...Get Me Out of Here!	2002–present
Saturday Kitchen	2002–present
Homes Under the Hammer	2003–present
Strictly Come Dancing	2004–presset
BBC Newswatch	2004–presset
Strictly Come Dancing: It Takes Two	2004–presset
Who Do You Think You Are?	2004–presset
The Apprentice	2005–present
Classic Doctors	2005, 2023–present
Deal or No Deal	2005–2016, 2023–present
Dragons' Den	2005–present
Springwatch	2005–present
Not Going Out	2006–present
The One Show	2006–present
Soccer Aid	2006–present
Waterloo Road	2006–2015, 2023–present
Britain's Got Talent	2007–2020, 2022–present
Would I Lie to You?	2007–present
Only Connect	2008–present
Pointless	2009–present
The Chase	2009–present
Kate Garraway's Life Stories	2009–present

=== 2010s ===
Programme	Date
The Great British Bake Off	2010–present
Great British Railway Journeys	2010–present
The Only Way Is Essex	2010–present
Junior Bake Off	2011–present
Made in Chelsea	2011–present
Death in Paradise	2011–present
The Jonathan Ross Show	2011–present
8 Out of 10 Cats Does Countdown	2012–present
Call the Midwife	2012–present
The Voice UK	2012–present
Tipping Point	2012–present
Father Brown	2013–2027
Good Morning Britain	2014–present
Grantchester	2014, 2016–2017, 2019–2027
Hunted	2015–present
Love Island	2015–present
Taskmaster	2015–present
Bake Off: The Professionals	2016–present
James Martin's Saturday Morning	2016–present
Love Island: Aftersun	2017–present
House of Games	2017–present
The Repair Shop	2017–present
Strike	2017–present
Peston	2018–present
Glow Up: Britain's Next Make-Up Star	2019–present
The Hit List	2019–present

=== 2020s ===
Programme	Date
2020
Beat the Chasers	2020–present
The Masked Singer	2020–present
Trying	2020–present
The Wheel	2020–present
2021
Cooking with the Stars	2021–present
Hope Street	2021–present
2022
The 1% Club	2022–present
Limitless Win	2022–present
Trigger Point	2022–present
Riddiculous	2022, 2024–present
2023
BBC News Now	2023–present
Blue Lights	2023–present
Beyond Paradise	2023–present
Changing Ends	2023–present
The Couple Next Door	2023–present
Doctor Who: Unleashed	2023–present
The Finish Line	2023–present
The Piano	2023–present
PopMaster TV	2023–present
2024
The Answer Run	2024–present
The Golden Cobra	2024–present
Ludwig	2024–present
Return to Paradise	2024–present
2025	2024–present
Amandaland	2025–present
Bergerac	2025–present
The Celebrity Traitors	2025–present
Chess Masters: The Endgame	2025–present
Code of Silence	2025–present
Death Valley	2025–present
Dept. Q	2025–present
Horrible Science	2025–present
The Inner Circle	2025–present
LOL: Last One Laughing UK	2025–present
Mobland	2025–present
The One That Got Away	2025–present
Patience	2025–present
The Princess Diaries	2025–present
A Thousand Blows	2025–present
Virgin Island	2025–present

== Ending this year ==
Date	Programme	Channel(s)	Debut(s)
1 January	Run Away	Netflix	2026
15 January	Agatha Christie's Seven Dials	Netflix	2026
19 January	Lucy Worsley's Victorian Murder Club	BBC Two	2026
23 January	Winterwatch	BBC Two	2012
25 January	Sky News at Ten	Sky News	1999
2 February	After the Flood	ITV1	2024
7 February	Waiting for the Out	BBC One	2026
19 February	Piglets	ITV1/ITV2	2024
25 February	Dirty Business	Channel 4	2026
29 March	Boarders	BBC Three	2024
10 April	CITV Breakfast	ITV1/ITV2/ITV4 & CITV	1983
14 April	Babies	BBC One	2026
17 April	Missed Call	5	2026
24 April	The Claudia Winkleman Show	BBC One	2026
3 May	Secret Garden	BBC One	2026
7 May	Number One Fan	5	2026
12 May	The Neighbourhood	ITV1	2026
13 May	Twenty Twenty Six	BBC Two	2026
18 May	The Cage	BBC One	2026
24 May	Football Focus	BBC One	1974
1 June	Dear England	BBC One	2026
3 June	Falling	Channel 4	2026
9 June	Tip Toe	Channel 4	2026
10 June	The Fortune	5	2026
13 June	Blankety Blank	BBC One & ITV1	1979, 1997, 2001, 2016 & 2020
14 June	Tiger Island	BBC One	2026
8 July	Katie Price: Nothing to Hide	Sky Documentaries	2026
14 July	I Kissed a Girl	BBC Three	2024
17 July	Heartstopper	Netflix	2022
27 July	The Dark	ITV1/ITVX	2026
9 August	The Rapture	BBC One	2026
16 August	Van der Valk	ITV1	1972, 1991, 2020 & 2022
20 August	Possession	Sky Atlantic	2026
31 August	River City	BBC One Scotland/BBC iPlayer	2002
22 September	Up	ITV1 (1964–1991, 2005–2026) & BBC One (1998)	1964, 1998 & 2005
12 October	Michael Palin in the Philippines	5	2026
18 October	Time	BBC One	2021
27 October	DIY SOS	BBC One	1999
31 October	Marble Hall Murders	BBC One	2026
5 November	RuPaul's Drag Race UK	BBC Three	2019
TBD in November or December	Live at the Apollo	BBC One & BBC Two	2004

== Deaths ==
Date	Name	Age	Broadcast credibility
1 January	Gregory de Polnay	82	English actor (Dixon of Dock Green, Doctor Who, Howards' Way)
9 January	Tina Packer	87	British actress (David Copperfield, Doctor Who) and stage director, co-founder of Shakespeare & Company
10 January	Derek Martin	92	English actor (EastEnders, Law & Order, King and Castle, The Governor)
11 January	Trevor A. Toussaint	65	English actor (Hollyoaks)
12 January	Sheila Bernette	94	English singer (The Good Old Days, The Black and White Minstrel Show) and actress (The Magnificent Seven Deadly Sins, Hotel Trubble, Coronation Street)
4 February	John Virgo	79	English professional snooker player, snooker commentator and game show referee (Big Break)
13 March	John Alford	54	Scottish actor (Now and Then, Grange Hill, London's Burning) and convicted sex offender
14 March	Jordan Wright	33	English television personality (The Only Way Is Essex, Ex on the Beach)
16 March	Sally Grace	74	English actress (The Animals of Farthing Wood, Mr. Bean: The Animated Series, Coronation Street, Ghost Story)
18 March	Tom Georgeson	89	English actor (A Fish Called Wanda, Boys from the Blackstuff, G.B.H., Bleak House)
20 March	Ben Keaton	69	Irish actor (Emmerdale, Casualty, Father Ted)
24 March	Mel Schilling	54	Australian-born television personality (Married at First Sight Australia, Married at First Sight UK)
6 April	Angela Pleasence	84	English actress (Hitler: The Last Ten Days, Coronation Street, Doctor Who, A Christmas Carol)
11 April	John Nolan	87	British actor (Person of Interest, Terror, Batman Begins, The Dark Knight Rises)
14 April	Alexander Morton	81	Scottish actor (Monarch of the Glen, Take the High Road, Taggart)
16 April	Andy Kershaw	66	English broadcaster (Live Aid) and radio DJ (BBC Radio 1)
21 April	Elsie Kelly	89	English actress (Benidorm, Crossroads)
26 April	Michael Keating	79	English actor (Blake's 7, EastEnders)
30 April	David Daker	90	English actor (Boon, Coronation Street)
6 May	Georgina Cates	51	English actress (2point4 Children)
7 May	Jake Hall	35	English television personality (The Only Way Is Essex)
7 May	Michael Pennington	82	English actor (Hamlet, Return of the Jedi, The Iron Lady), co-founder of the English Shakespeare Company and writer
10 May	David Burke	91	British actor (Sherlock Holmes, Reilly, Ace of Spies, The Love School)
14 May	Alan Rothwell	89	English actor (Coronation Street, Top Secret, Brookside, Wilmot)
21 May	Judith Chalmers	90	English television presenter (Wish You Were Here...?, Come Dancing)
27 May	Owain Rhys Davies	44	Welsh actor (Twin Peaks, Alice Through the Looking Glass, A Serial Killer's Guide to Life)
1 June	Anthony Head	72	English actor (Buffy the Vampire Slayer, Little Britain, Merlin, Ted Lasso, Doctor Who)
13 June	Roger Cook	83	English journalist and presenter (The Cook Report)
20 June	Michael Byrne	86	English actor (Coronation Street, A Bridge Too Far, Indiana Jones and the Last Crusade)
27 June	Anna Dawson	88	British actress and singer (Dixon of Dock Green, The Benny Hill Show, Keeping Up Appearances)
27 June	Ian Kennedy Martin	90	British scriptwriter (The Sweeney, The Capone Investment, Mitchell, Juliet Bravo, TECX)
27 June	Eileen Mayers	94	British actress (Sheila Birtles in Coronation Street)
29 June	Dame Penelope Keith	86	English actress (The Good Life, To the Manor Born, Executive Stress, No Job for a Lady, Next of Kin)
7 July	Joanna Pettet	83	English actress (Casino Royale, The Night of the Generals, The Evil)
8 July	Bonnie Tyler	75	Welsh singer (represented the United Kingdom at the Eurovision Song Contest 2013)
8 July	Ann Widdecombe	78	British politician and television personality (Strictly Come Dancing, Cleverdicks, Celebrity Big Brother)
11 July	Dermot Murnaghan	68	English media personality (The Channel Four Daily, ITV News, BBC News, Sky News, Eggheads)
18 July	Tom Chadbon	80	English actor (Doctor Who, Tess, Casino Royale)
18 July	Terence Donovan	90	British-Australian actor (Home and Away, Neighbours, The Man from Snowy River, Breaker Morant)
18 July	Edward Stourton	68	British broadcaster and presenter (Sunday, Today, Channel 4 News, BBC One O'Clock News)
25 July	Bill Oddie	85	English comedian, voice actor and naturalist (The Goodies, Bananaman, Birding with Bill Oddie, Springwatch, Autumnwatch)
27 July	Phyllida Law	94	Scottish actress (Kingdom, Much Ado About Nothing, Peter's Friends, The Winter Guest)
2 August	Rod Liddle	66	British journalist and broadcaster (Today)
3 August	Jimmy Cricket	80	Northern Irish comedian and television host (And There's More)
9 August	Cheryl Hall	76	English actress (Doctor Who, EastEnders, The Bill)
25 August	Tim Curry	80	English actor (The Rocky Horror Picture Show, Annie, It, Oliver Twist, Blue Money, Clue, The Hunt for Red October, Congo, Muppet Treasure Island, Terry Pratchett's The Colour of Magic, Home Alone 2: Lost in New York, Beauty and the Beast: The Enchanted Christmas, The Wild Thornberrys, The Adventures of Jimmy Neutron, Boy Genius)
4 September	Richard O'Sullivan	82	English actor (Man About the House, Robin's Nest, Dick Turpin, Doctor at Large, Doctor in Charge, Me and My Girl, Trouble in Mind)
18 September	Stephanie Cole	84	English actress (Tenko, Open All Hours, Waiting for God, Keeping Mum, Doc Martin, Coronation Street, Still Open All Hours, Man Down)
30 September	Dame Esther Rantzen	86	British journalist and television presenter (That's Life!, Hearts of Gold, Esther, Childline)
5 October	George Fenton	76	English film and television composer (Gandhi, The Fisher King, Planet Earth, Newsnight)
28 October	Sir Patrick Stewart	86	English actor (Star Trek: The Next Generation, Star Trek: Picard, X-Men, Macbeth, The Pagemaster, American Dad!, Jimmy Neutron: Boy Genius)
1 November	John Leeson	83	English actor (Doctor Who, Rainbow, The Sarah Jane Adventures)
9 November	Tommy Walsh	69	English celebrity builder (Ground Force)
10 November	Helen Fraser	84	English actress (Coronation Street, Bad Girls, Billy Liar, Gorillas in the Mist, The Rector's Wife)
21 November	Peter Fluck	85	English caricaturist and puppeteer (Spitting Image)

== See also ==
- 2026 in British radio
