= List of people from Rancho Cucamonga, California =

This is a list of people from Rancho Cucamonga, California.

- Carlos Bocanegra, former center back, left back for Stade Rennais, grew up in Alta Loma and attended Alta Loma High School currently serving as technical director and vice president for Atlanta United.
- Tom Brunansky, former Major League Baseball player
- Mercedes Carrera, porn star, political commentator and former aerospace engineer
- Charles Castronovo, internationally renowned opera singer, was raised in Rancho Cucamonga, and attended Alta Loma High School
- Patrick Chung, former University of Oregon safety, 2009 New England Patriots second-round draft pick, attended Rancho Cucamonga High School
- Kenyon Coleman, former NFL football player grew up in Alta Loma and attended Alta Loma High School
- Darren Collison, former NBA point guard; went to Etiwanda High School
- Collin Delia, Chicago Blackhawks goaltender
- Maurice Edu, former Maryland soccer player and the #1 overall selection in the 2007 MLS SuperDraft by Toronto FC; went to Etiwanda High School
- Rollie Fingers, former Major League Baseball pitcher and Hall of Famer, lived in Cucamonga and attended Chaffey College
- Oz Fox, lead guitarist for the Christian heavy metal band Stryper, lives in Rancho Cucamonga
- Lionel Manuel, former New York Giants wide receiver who played seven seasons in the NFL, grew up in Rancho Cucamonga
- Nichkhun, American born ethnic Thai-Chinese member of popular South Korean boy-band 2PM
- Woodworker Sam Maloof lived in Alta Loma; his work is featured in museums around the United States, including the Smithsonian Institution. His home is a State of California historical landmark. During the construction of the 210 Foothill Freeway, Maloof's home was moved from the 210 freeway corridor to the top of Carnelian Street, where it is now a museum.
- Tatiana Suarez Padilla, UFC TUF MMA Fighter
- Trevor Penick, member of boy band O-Town, which debuted in 2000
- Leah Pruitt, American professional soccer player, was born in Rancho Cucamonga and attended Alta Loma High School.
- Matt Rogers, football coach, television host of Really Big Things and There Goes the Neighborhood on the Discovery Channel and American Idol contestant, was born in 1978 in Rancho Cucamonga and still lives there.
- Rufio, alternative rock band, formed in 2000
- C. J. Stroud, quarterback for the Houston Texans and 2021 Heisman finalist, attended Rancho Cucamonga High School
- Craig Traylor, actor who played Stevie on Malcolm in the Middle, lives in Rancho Cucamonga
- Andrew Vasquez, professional baseball pitcher for the Minnesota Twins
- Eric Weddle, former NFL safety, lived in Rancho Cucamonga, attended Alta Loma
- Kendall Williams, basketball player for University of New Mexico and Victoria Libertas Pesaro
- Matt and Nick Jackson, professional wrestlers collectively known as the Young Bucks
- Young Noble, rapper, born in Rancho Cucamonga
- Frank Zappa, musician who lived in and worked in Cucamonga during the early 1960s. He bought the Pal Recording Studio from a friend, Paul Buff, and renamed it "Studio Z". The studio closed in 1964 when the building was demolished in order to widen Archibald Avenue. ("Cucamonga" is also the name of a long-lived radio show on Radio 1, Belgium, as an obscure reference to Zappa.)
