= Tiger Island (disambiguation) =

Tiger Island can refer to:

== Locations ==
- Tiger Island, also called El Tigre Island, a disputed volcanic island administered now by Honduras
- Tiger Island (Antarctica), off Victoria Land, Antarctica
- Tigres Island, Angola
- Cồn Cỏ island, off the coast of central Vietnam
- Menghu Islet (Tiger Island), Lieyu Township, Kinmen County, Fujian, Republic of China (Taiwan)

== Other ==
- Tiger Island (Dreamworld), wildlife attraction at the Dreamworld amusement park on the Gold Coast, Queensland, Australia
- Tiger Island (film), a 1930 silent Australian film
- Tiger Island (TV series), a 2026 TV documentary
