= The Neighbourhood (TV series) =

Unsuccessful British reality television series

- Genre: Reality
- Presented by: Graham Norton
- Country of origin: United Kingdom
- Original language: English
- No. of series: 1
- No. of episodes: 11

Production
- Production locations: Darwin Lake Holiday Village, Matlock
- Running time: 60 minutes (inc. adverts)
- Production companies: Lifted Entertainment; The Garden

Original release
- Network: ITV
- Release: 24 April – 12 May 2026

The Neighbourhood is a British reality television series which premiered on 24 April 2026 on ITV1 and ITVX. The first episode aired inbetween the two-part final of the second series of I'm a Celebrity... South Africa and was also simulcast on ITV2. The series was presented by Graham Norton.

The programme saw multiple households competing in a popularity contest to win a £250,000 cash prize. The number of people in each household varied from three to five. The game began with six households, with two more families joining in the second and third episodes respectively. The series was broadcast to low ratings, which caused it to be rescheduled out of its primetime slot, and conclude earlier than planned on 12 May 2026, being axed as a result.

== Format ==
The series involved living together in a specially created neighbourhood. Filmed in Derbyshire, the families lived on a self-contained street in the Peak District. The filming was done at the Darwin Lake Holiday Village in Matlock.

In the game there were Neighbourhood Challenges. The winning household became immune from the next elimination, which was known as a Removal. At each Removal one member of each household placed a "for sale" sign outside the household that they wanted to remove. In the event of a tied vote, the immune household broke the tie.

== Production ==
The series was announced by ITV Studios in 2025. The series launched on 24 April 2026, in-between the two-part final of the second series of I'm a Celebrity... South Africa with the first episode also being simulcast on ITV2.

Weak viewership figures saw the remainder of the series made available on ITVX following the linear broadcast of the fourth episode, and, after the fifth, its ITV1 broadcast was moved to a late slot (airing at various times between 10pm and 10:55pm, largely following ITV1's late news bulletin) and burned off nightly from 7 May to 12 May 2026. In May 2026, prior to the conclusion of the series, it was announced that the programme had been axed due to low ratings.

== Transmission dates ==
Series	Episodes	Premiere	Finale	Winners
1	11	24 April 2026	12 May 2026	The Campbell-Grahams

== Households ==
Six households entered the street during the first episode, with further families joining in episodes two, four and six respectively.

Household	Entered	Exited	Status
The Kandolas & Samra (Ruben, Sunita & Tony)	Episode 1	Episode 2	Removed
The Scouse Haus (Louise, Lyndsey & Rosie)	Episode 1	Episode 3	Removed
The Lozman-Sturrocks (Christine, Dave, Jordan & Katie)	Episode 1	Episode 6	Removed
The Pescuds (Grace, Harrison, Paul & Wendy)	Episode 1	Episode 9	Removed
The Heslewoods (Jack, Kerry & John)	Episode 6	Episode 9	Removed
The Uni Boys (DJ, Fahad, Hadi & Kevin)	Episode 1	Episode 10	Removed
The Bradons (Alicia, Fay-Marie, Lucas, Nathan & Zach)	Episode 1	Episode 11	Third place
The Khans (Iman, Maryam & Tara)	Episode 4	Episode 11	Runners-up
The Campbell-Grahams (Donna, Ken & Thai)	Episode 2	Episode 11	Winners

== Reception ==
Professional ratings
Review scores
Source	Rating
The Daily Telegraph	2/5 stars
The Guardian	2/5 stars
The Independent	3/5 stars

The series received a mainly negative response from critics. Lucy Mangan of The Guardian rated the show 2 out of 5 stars and said that "Graham Norton lifts the energy when he's there but is only present for the welcome and removals-voting. The contestants are largely a charisma-free bunch, and the only one that isn't is evicted early, with a suggestion of underlying racism that everyone works very hard to ignore." Katie Rosseinsky for The Independent compared the programme to The Traitors however noted the show did share its "psychological intrigue" and said that "presumably things will become more tense the longer the residents have been stuck in the Neighbourhood – and the closer they get to the prize money. For now, though, there's not quite enough to ensure that viewers will want to stick around for the full duration of the tenancy." Anita Singh of The Daily Telegraph also compared the programme to The Traitors but noted "the only moment of mild drama occurred at the end, when the contestants had to signal who they were voting out by planting a "For Sale" sign in that household's front garden. The show is full of quirky little design touches like this, and it seems as if the producers have put more thought into how it looks than how engaging it is to watch.

The series launched to an overnight rating (i.e. the number of viewers who watched on the night of broadcast) of 1.2 million, below the average viewership the channel usually achieved in its timeslot, together with almost 62,000 for its ITV2 simulcast. By its third episode, it had fallen to 541,000 viewers, and maintained a similar-sized audience for the episodes that remained at 9pm. The first episode to air in a late slot accrued an audience of 229,000.

== See also ==
- There Goes the Neighborhood, a 2009 American reality game show featuring families competing against each other while living in a purpose-built neighbourhood, hosted by Matt Rogers.
