= Lucy Worsley =

English historian (born 1973)

Lucy Worsley OBE FRHistS
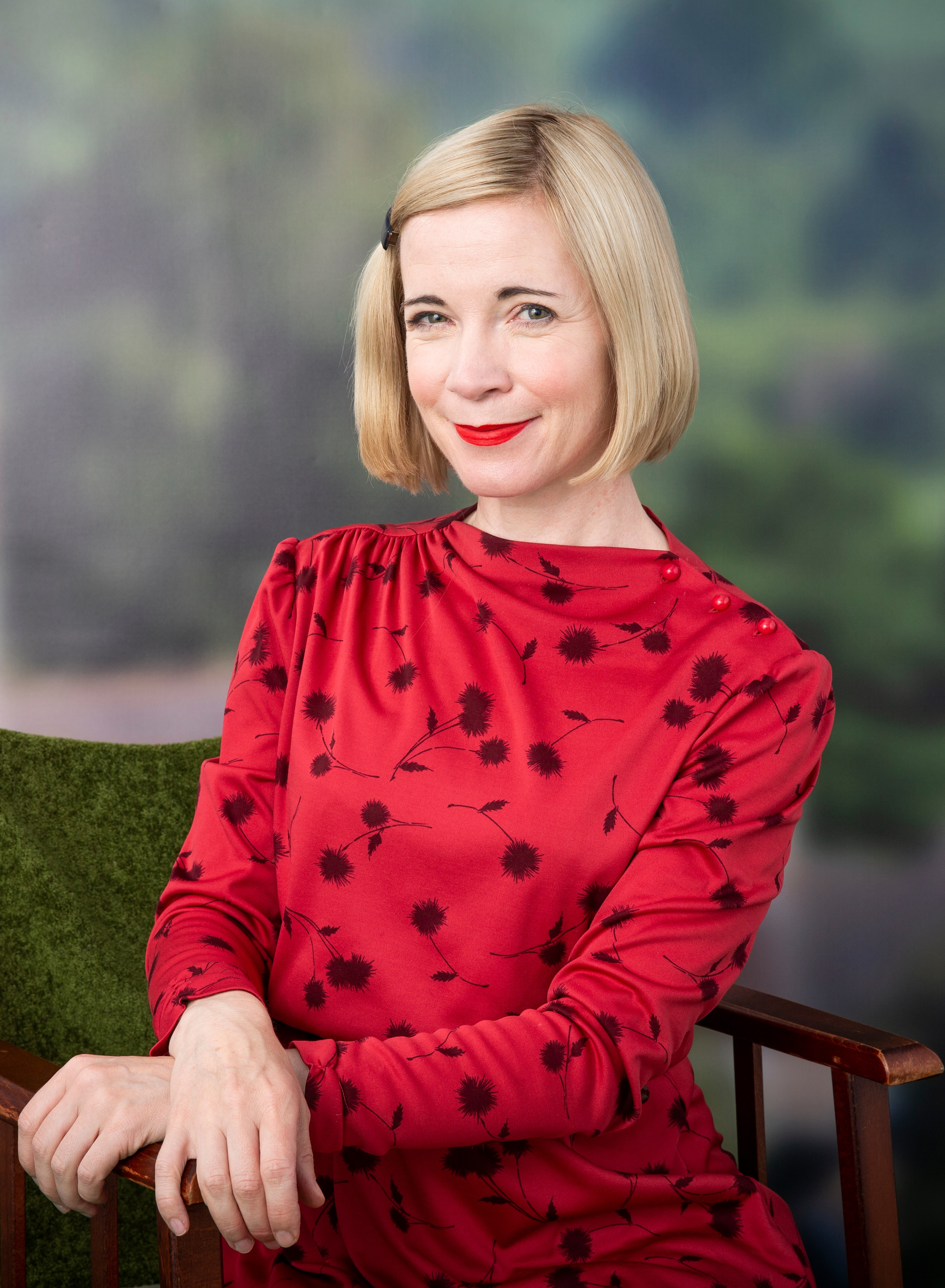
- Worsley in 2019
- Born: 18 December 1973 (age 52); Reading, Berkshire, England
- Education: New College, Oxford; (BA, 1995); University of Sussex; (DPhil, 2001)
- Occupations: Historian, author, curator, television presenter
- Spouse: Mark Hines (m. 2011)
- Website: lucyworsley.com

Lucy Worsley (born 18 December 1973) is an English historian, author, curator and television presenter. She was the joint chief curator at Historic Royal Palaces from 2003 to 2024, but is best known amongst UK television viewers as a presenter of BBC Television and Channel 5 series on historical topics.

== Early life and education ==
Worsley was born on 18 December 1973 in Reading, Berkshire, England, to Peter and Enid (née Kay) Worsley. Her father taught Geology at Reading University, while her mother was a consultant in educational policy and practice. She was educated at The Abbey School, Reading, an all-girls independent school, and two comprehensive schools: St Bartholomew's School in Newbury, Berkshire, and West Bridgford School in Nottingham. A history teacher 'fired up her brain' by teaching about the Industrial Revolution through a political lens.

She studied ancient and modern history at New College, Oxford, graduating in 1995 with a first-class honours Bachelor of Arts (BA) degree. In 2001, she was awarded a Doctor of Philosophy (DPhil) degree from the University of Sussex. Her doctoral thesis was titled "The Architectural Patronage of William Cavendish, first Duke of Newcastle, 1593–1676".

Worsley played piano from the age of four, took lessons for 15 years and passed all the piano grades. Of her teacher, Miss Beaumont, she said: "At the time I was terrified of her but in retrospect she gave me a great gift of self-discipline and self-reliance. She made me strive for excellence and work hard. To help somebody to get better and really to challenge them, that's a rare and valuable thing."

== Career ==
=== Curator and academic ===
Worsley began her career as a historic house curator at Milton Manor, near Abingdon, in the summer of 1995, before working for the Society for the Protection of Ancient Buildings. From 1996 to 2002, she was an inspector of historic buildings for English Heritage in the East Midlands region. During that time, she studied the life of William Cavendish, 1st Duke of Newcastle and wrote the English Heritage guide to his home, Bolsover Castle in Derbyshire. In 2001, she was awarded a DPhil degree from the University of Sussex for a thesis on The Architectural Patronage of William Cavendish, first Duke of Newcastle, 1593–1676. The thesis was later developed into Worsley's book Cavalier: A Tale of Chivalry, Passion and Great Houses, published in 2007.

During 2002–2003, she was the major projects and research manager for Glasgow Museums before becoming chief curator at Historic Royal Palaces, the independent charity responsible for maintaining the Tower of London, Hampton Court Palace, Kensington Palace State Apartments, the Banqueting House in Whitehall and Kew Palace in Kew Gardens. She oversaw the £12 million refurbishment of the Kensington Palace state apartments and gardens, completed in 2012.

In 2005, she was elected a senior research fellow at the Institute of Historical Research, University of London; she was also appointed visiting professor at Kingston University in west London.

In October 2024, Worsley announced that she would be stepping down from her role at Historic Royal Palaces at the end of the year to focus on her Lady Killers podcast.

=== Television ===
In 2011, Worsley presented the four-part television series If Walls Could Talk, exploring the history of British homes, from peasants' cottages to palaces; and the three-part series Elegance and Decadence: The Age of the Regency. In 2012 she co-presented the three-part television series Antiques Uncovered, with antiques and collectibles expert Mark Hill, and (broadcast at the same time) Harlots, Housewives and Heroines, a three-part series on the lives of women after the Civil War and the Restoration of Charles II. Later that year she presented a documentary on Dorothy Hartley's Food in England as part of the BBC Four "Food and Drink" strand.

Her BBC series A Very British Murder (and the accompanying book, also released as The Art of the English Murder) examined the "morbid national obsession" with murder. The series looked at a number of cases from the 19th century, beginning with the Ratcliff Highway murders which gained national attention in 1811, and the Red Barn Murder of 1826.

In 2014, the three-part series The First Georgians: The German Kings Who Made Britain explored the contributions of the German-born kings George I and George II. The series explained why the Hanoverian George I came to be chosen as a British monarch, how he was succeeded by his very different son George II and why, without either, the current United Kingdom would likely be a very different place. The series emphasises the positive influence of these kings whilst showing the flaws in each. A Very British Romance, a three-part series for BBC Four, was based on the romantic novels and sought to uncover the forces shaping the very British idea of 'happily ever after' and how Britons' feelings have been affected by social, political and cultural ideas.

In 2016, Worsley presented the three-part documentary Empire of the Tsars: Romanov Russia with Lucy Worsley in January and Lucy Worsley: Mozart's London Odyssey in June. In September 2016, she was filming an upcoming series A Very British History for BBC Four. In December she presented and appeared in dramatised accounts of the three-part BBC series Six Wives with Lucy Worsley. In 2017, she presented a three-part series titled British History's Biggest Fibs with Lucy Worsley, debunking historical views of the Wars of the Roses, the Glorious Revolution and the British occupation of India.

In 2019, Worsley presented American History's Biggest Fibs, looking at the nation's founding story and American Revolution, the American Civil War, and the Cold War.

During February and March 2020, the first series of Royal History's Biggest Fibs with Lucy Worsley was shown on BBC Four; the three-part series discovers how the history of The Reformation, The Spanish Armada and Queen Anne and the Union have been manipulated and mythologised.

In November 2020, the second series of Royal History's Biggest Fibs with Lucy Worsley aired on BBC2, covering the myths behind the French Revolution, George IV and the Russian Revolution.

In 2022, Lucy Worsley Investigates began running. The one-hour programme investigates major events in British History, including The Black Death, The Madness of King George, and The Princes in the Tower.

On 22 June 2023, she presented The Krypton Factor-style quiz show Puzzling, which made its debut on Channel 5, and of which there are 13 episodes.

=== Writing ===
Worsley has published a number of books, many guides to houses and the like. Courtiers: The Secret History of the Georgian Court (2011) is her most recent work on history. In 2014, BBC Books published her book, A Very British Murder, which was based on the series. In April 2016, Worsley published her debut children's novel, Eliza Rose, about a young noble girl in a Tudor Court. In 2017, Worsley published a biography of Jane Austen titled Jane Austen at Home: A Biography.

Worsley also wrote the young-adult book Lady Mary, a history-based book that details the life of Mary I, daughter of Henry VIII and Catherine of Aragon; it follows her as a young Princess Mary during the time of the divorce of Mary's parents.

== Personal life ==
Worsley lives in Southwark by the River Thames in south London with her husband, architect Mark Hines, whom she married in November 2011. Their home is "a minimalist loft-style flat". With reference to having children, Worsley once said she has been "educated out of normal reproductive function", but she later said that statement had been "misinterpreted and sounded darker than I'd intended." She has said that she is "childless-by-choice".

As a television presenter, she is known for having a rhotacism, a minor speech impairment which affects her pronunciation of "r". When she made the move from BBC Four to BBC Two for the series Fit to Rule: How Royal Illness Changed History, she worked with a speech and language therapist to help with her pronunciation, but to no avail.

In her teens, Worsley represented Berkshire at cross country running, and is still a runner.

== Awards and honours ==
- In February 2015, the Royal Television Society nominated Worsley (best presenter) and The First Georgians (best history programme) in its annual awards.
- In July 2015, she was made an honorary Doctor of Letters by the University of Sussex (where she completed her doctorate).
- She was appointed Officer of the Order of the British Empire (OBE) in the 2018 Birthday Honours for services to history and heritage. The investiture by Charles, Prince of Wales, took place at Buckingham Palace on 16 November 2018.
- Worsley is an elected Fellow of the Royal Historical Society (FRHistS).

== Credits ==
=== Television programmes ===
Year	Title	Channel	Notes
2009	Inside the Body of Henry VIII	History Channel	
2010	King Alfred the Great?	BBC South	17 May 2010
2010	The Curse of the Hope Diamond	Channel 4	24 May 2010
2011	When God Spoke English	BBC Four	Guest interview as Chief Curator of Hampton Court (21 February 2011)
2011	If Walls Could Talk: The History of the Home	BBC Four	Four-part series (April 2011)
2011	Elegance and Decadence: The Age of the Regency	BBC Four	Three-part series (August–September 2011)
2012	Our Food	BBC Two	Four-part series (April 2012). Hosted by Giles Coren, co-presented with James Wong, Alex Langlands & Alys Fowler
2012	Antiques Uncovered	BBC Two	Three-part series (May 2012)
2012	Inside the World of Henry VIII	History Channel	
2012	Harlots, Housewives and Heroines: A 17th Century History for Girls	BBC Four	Three-part series (May 2012)
2012	Food in England: The Lost World of Dorothy Hartley	BBC Four	6 November 2012
2013	Secret Knowledge, Episode 3	BBC Four	Bolsover Castle (27 March 2013)
2013	Fit to Rule: How Royal Illness Changed History	BBC Two	Part 1, Part 2, Part 3
2013	Tales from the Royal Bedchamber	BBC Four	5 August 2013
2013	A Very British Murder	BBC Four	Three-part series (23 September 2013)
2014	The First Georgians: The German Kings Who Made Britain	BBC Four	Three-part series (1 May 2014)
2014	Masterchef	BBC One	8 May 2014. Guest judge
2014	Tales from the Royal Wardrobes	BBC Four	7 July 2014
2014	Dancing Cheek to Cheek: An Intimate History of Dance	BBC Four	17 November 2014. Co-presented with Len Goodman
2015	Britain's Tudor Treasure: A Night at Hampton Court	BBC Two	7 February 2015. Co-presented with David Starkey
2015	Cake Bakers and Trouble Makers: Lucy Worsley's 100 Years of the WI	BBC Two	20 July 2015
2015	Dancing Through the Blitz: Blackpool's Big Band Story	BBC Two	25 July 2015. Co-presented with Len Goodman and Jools Holland
2015	When Lucy Met Roy: Sir Roy Strong at 80	BBC Four	23 August 2015
2015	Lucy Worsley's Reins of Power: The Art of Horse Dancing	BBC Four	15 September 2015
2015	A Very British Romance	BBC Four	Three-part series (8 October 2015)
2015	The Great History Quiz: The Tudors	BBC Two	24 December 2015. Quiz team captain
2016	Empire of the Tsars: Romanov Russia with Lucy Worsley	BBC Four	6, 13 & 20 January 2016
2016	The Real Versailles	BBC Two	30 May 2016. Co-presented with Helen Castor
2016	Lucy Worsley: Mozart's London Odyssey	BBC Four	21 June 2016
2016	Six Wives with Lucy Worsley	BBC One	Three-part series (December 2016)
2017	British History's Biggest Fibs with Lucy Worsley	BBC Four	Three-part series (January–February 2017)
2017	Jane Austen: Behind Closed Doors	BBC Two	27 May 2017
2017	Lucy Worsley's Nights at the Opera	BBC Two	Two-part series (14 October 2017, 21 October 2017)
2017	Lucy Worsley: Elizabeth I's Battle for God's Music	BBC Four	17 October 2017
2018	Lucy Worsley's Fireworks for a Tudor Queen	BBC Four	7 March 2018
2018	Suffragettes with Lucy Worsley	BBC One	4 June 2018
2018	Victoria & Albert: The Royal Wedding	BBC Two	21 December 2018
2019	American History's Biggest Fibs with Lucy Worsley	BBC Four	Three-part series (January 2019)
2019	Queen Victoria: My Musical Britain	BBC Two	11 May 2019
2019	Lucy Worsley's Christmas Carol Odyssey	BBC Four	10 December 2019
2019	A Merry Tudor Christmas with Lucy Worsley	BBC Two	20 December 2019
2020	Royal History's Biggest Fibs with Lucy Worsley	BBC Four	Series 1; 18 & 25 February, 3 March 2020. Series 2; 6, 13 & 20 November 2020
2020	Lucy Worsley's Royal Photo Album	BBC Four	The story of the royal photograph (14 May 2020)
2020–2021	Lucy Worsley's Royal Myths & Secrets	PBS	Series 1; 21 & 28 June, 5 July 2020. Series 2; 29 August 2021, 5 & 12 September 2021
2021	Lucy Worsley's Royal Palace Secrets	BBC Four	January 2021
2021	Blitz Spirit with Lucy Worsley	BBC One	90-minute documentary (23 February 2021)
2022	Rebuilding Notre-Dame	BBC Two	Documentary (28 April 2022)
2022	Agatha Christie: Lucy Worsley on the Mystery Queen	BBC Two	Three-part series
2022, 2025	Lucy Worsley Investigates	BBC Two & PBS	Two four-part series.
2023	Puzzling	Channel 5	Thirteen-part quiz show
2023	Florence Nightingale: Nursing Pioneer	BBC Four	Narrator
2023	Killing Sherlock: Lucy Worsley on the Case of Conan Doyle	BBC Two	Three-part series
2026	Lucy Worsley's Victorian Murder Club	BBC Two	Three-part series
2026	Lucy Worsley Investigates: The American Revolution	BBC Two & PBS	Two-part series.
2026	Lucy Worsley's Keys to the Castle	BBC Two & PBS	Upcoming four-part series.

=== Podcasts ===
- Lady Killers with Lucy Worsley (2022–present)
- Lady Swindlers with Lucy Worsley (2024–2025)

== Bibliography ==
=== Guidebooks ===
- —— (1998). Hardwick Old Hall. English Heritage Guidebooks. ISBN 9781850746959.
- ——; Wilson, Louise (2001). Bolsover Castle. English Heritage Guidebooks. ISBN 9781850747628.
- —— (2001). Kirby Hall, Northamptonshire. English Heritage Guidebooks. ISBN 9781850747475.
- ——; Souden, David (2005). Hampton Court Palace: The Official Illustrated History. Merrell Publishers. ISBN 9781858942827.
- ——; Dolman, Brett; Souden, David (2008). The Royal Palaces of London. Merrell. ISBN 9781858944234. Foreword by HRH The Prince of Wales

=== Other non-fiction ===
- Cavalier: A Tale of Chivalry, Passion and Great Houses (Faber & Faber, 2007, ISBN 9780571227037)
  - Cavalier: The Story of a 17th Century Playboy (paperback edition, Faber & Faber, 2008, ISBN 9780571227044)
- Henry VIII: 500 Facts, with Brett Dolman, Suzannah Lipscomb and Lee Prosser (Historic Royal Palaces, 2009, ISBN 9781873993125)
- Courtiers: The Secret History of the Georgian Court (Faber & Faber, 2011, ISBN 9780571238903)
  - The Courtiers: Splendor and Intrigue in the Georgian Court at Kensington Palace (US edition, Walker Books, 2010, ISBN 9780802719874)
- If Walls Could Talk: An Intimate History of the Home (Faber & Faber, 2012, ISBN 9780571259540)
- A Very British Murder: The Story of a National Obsession (BBC Books, 2013, ISBN 9781849906340)
  - The Art of the English Murder: From Jack the Ripper and Sherlock Holmes to Agatha Christie and Alfred Hitchcock (US edition, Pegasus Books, 2015, ISBN 9781605989099)
- Jane Austen at Home (Hodder & Stoughton, 2017, ISBN 9781473632189)
- Queen Victoria: Daughter, Wife, Mother, Widow (Hodder & Stoughton, 2018, ISBN 9781473651388)
  - Queen Victoria: Twenty-Four Days That Changed Her Life (US edition, St. Martin's Press, 2019, ISBN 9781250201423)
- Agatha Christie: A Very Elusive Woman (Hodder & Stoughton, 2022, ISBN 9781529303872)
- Queens and Kings: An Unusually Personal History (Hodder & Stoughton, 2026, ISBN 9781399748407)

=== Young adult fiction ===
- —— (2016). Eliza Rose. Bloomsbury Children's. ISBN 9781408869437.
  - —— (2017). Maid of the King's Court. Candlewick Press. ISBN 9780763688066.
- —— (2017). My Name Is Victoria. Bloomsbury Children's. ISBN 9781408882016.
- —— (2018). Lady Mary. Bloomsbury Children's. ISBN 9781408869444.
- —— (2020). The Austen Girls. Bloomsbury Children's. ISBN 9781526605450.

=== Forewords and introductions ===
- Hartley, Dorothy (2012). Lost World: England 1933–1936. Introduction by Lucy Worsley. Prospect Books. ISBN 9781903018972.
- —— (2014). "Introduction". In Corbett, Sue (ed.). The Times – Great Women's Lives: A Celebration in Obituaries. The History Press. ISBN 9780750962346.
- —— (2015). "Introduction". In Historic Royal Palaces Enterprises (ed.). Chocolate Fit for a Queen. Ebury Press. ISBN 9781785031243.
- Austen, Jane (2017). Mansfield Park. Introduction by Lucy Worsley. Illustrated by Darya Shnykina. Folio Society. OCLC 1107990187.
- Wilding, Valerie (2020). Fabulously Feisty Queens. Introduction by Lucy Worsley. Illustrated by Pauline Reeves. London: Wren & Rook. ISBN 9781526361905.

=== Tours ===
- Lucy Worsley: A Very British Murder (2021)
- An Audience with Lucy Worsley on Agatha Christie (2022–2024)
- An Audience with Lucy Worsley on Jane Austen (2024–2025)
