= Kate Lister (writer) =

English author, columnist, and podcaster

- Lister in 2024
- Born: Kathryn Louise Lister; 18 October 1981 (age 44); Ulverston, Cumbria, England
- Education: Leeds Trinity University; University of Leeds
- Occupations: Author; columnist; podcaster
- Years active: 2016–present
- Website: drkatelister.com

Kathryn Louise Lister (born 18 October 1981) is an English feminist author, columnist, and podcaster, principally on women's rights and the history of sexuality and sexual behaviour.

== Early life and education ==
Born in Ulverston, Cumbria, she attended Ulverston Victoria High School and Ulverston Victoria Sixth Form College. She studied English literature at Leeds Trinity University and the University of Leeds, writing her doctoral thesis on "Women Authors and the Early Nineteenth-Century Arthurian Revival". Her doctoral supervisors were Professor Catherine Batt at the University of Leeds and Professor Paul Hardwick of Leeds Trinity University. She was a senior lecturer in the Centre for Victorian Studies at Leeds Trinity University, before becoming a freelance writer.

== Career ==
In 2016, Lister set up an online blog and research forum, Whores of Yore, which by 2021 had over 360,000 followers on Twitter. She has since written and published extensively on sexuality in history, and in particular the history of prostitution. Her book, A Curious History of Sex, was published in 2020, and was followed by Harlots, Whores & Hackabouts: A History of Sex for Sale, in 2021. As well as her blog, she writes regularly for the i newspaper, and has made appearances on British radio and television. She also supports charities for sex workers in Leeds. In 2017, she won a Sexual Freedom Award as Publicist of the Year for her blog.

In 2025, Kate Lister was highly commended for Broadsheet Columnist of the Year at the British Press Awards.

She has been the host of the History Hit podcast, "Betwixt the Sheets: The History of Sex, Scandal, and Society" since 2022. The podcast was nominated for Best New Podcast at the Audio and Radio Industry Awards in 2023. Betwixt the Sheets won the Listener’s Choice Award at the 2025 British Podcast Awards.

In January 2026, she appeared in Lucy Worsley's Victorian Murder Club aired by BBC Two.

== Bibliography ==
- Paraphernalia! Victorian Objects, Helen Kingstone (Editor), Kate Lister (Editor) (Routledge, 2018)
- Vikings and the Vikings: Essays on Television’s History Channel Series, Paul Hardwick (Editor), Kate Lister (Editor), (McFarland, 2019)
- A Curious History of Sex (London: Unbound, 2020)
- Harlots, Whores & Hackabouts (London: Thames and Hudson, 2021)
- FLICK: The Story of Female Pleasure, (Transworld Publishers Ltd, 2026)
