= 31st National Television Awards =

British awards ceremony in 2026

- Date: 8 September 2026
- Location: The O2 Arena, London
- Country: United Kingdom
- Presented by: Various
- Hosted by: Joel Dommett
- Most awards: Emmerdale (2)
- Most nominations: Coronation Street; EastEnders (3)
- Website: www.nationaltvawards.com

Television/radio coverage
- Network: ITV1
- Runtime: 150 minutes

The 31st National Television Awards were held on 8 September 2026 at the O2 Arena and hosted by Joel Dommett for the sixth year running. The longlist nominations were released on 19 May 2026, with the shortlist following on 18 August.

== Performances ==
- Hawkstone Farmers Choir – "One Day Like This"
- Amanda Holden, Charlotte Church, David Olusoga, Kate Garraway and Paloma Faith – "I Know Him So Well"

== Awards ==
Category and presenter(s)	Winner	Shortlisted
Reality Competition; Presented by Gordon Ramsay	The Celebrity Traitors (BBC One)	I'm a Celebrity...Get Me Out of Here! (ITV1); I'm a Celebrity... South Africa (ITV1); Race Across the World (BBC One); The Traitors (BBC One)
Reality Docuseries; Presented by Francis Bourgeois, James Engelsman & Thomas Holland	Clarkson's Farm (Prime Video)	At Home with the Furys (Netflix); Fletchers' Family Farm (ITV1); Stacey & Joe (BBC One)
New Drama; Presented by Adrian Dunbar, Martin Compston & Vicky McClure	I Fought The Law (ITV1)	A Woman of Substance (Channel 4); Believe Me (ITVX); Heated Rivalry (Sky Atlantic/Crave); The Other Bennet Sister (BBC One)
Quiz Show; Presented by Rob Beckett	The 1% Club (ITV1)	Limitless Win (ITV1); The Wheel (BBC One); House of Games (BBC Two); The Chase (ITV1)
Authored Documentary; Presented by Holly Willoughby	Our Girls: The Southport Families (BBC One)	Caroline Flack: Search for the Truth (Disney+); Jesy Nelson: Life After Little Mix (Prime Video); Ozzy Osbourne: Coming Home (BBC One); Sir Chris Hoy: Cancer, Courage and Me (BBC One)
Returning Drama; Presented by Luke Evans	Call the Midwife (BBC One)	Blue Lights (BBC One); Bridgerton (Netflix); Stranger Things (Netflix); Trigger Point (ITV1)
TV Presenter; Presented by Clive Myrie	David Attenborough (Secret Garden – (BBC One)	Alison Hammond (This Morning – ITV1); Ant & Dec (Britain's Got Talent, I'm a Celebrity...Get Me Out of Here!, I'm a Celebrity... South Africa and Limitless Win – ITV1); Claudia Winkleman (The Celebrity Traitors, Strictly Come Dancing and The Traitors) – BBC One); Stacey Solomon (Sort Your Life Out – BBC One)
Factual Entertainment; Presented by Mo Gilligan	Gogglebox (Channel 4)	24 Hours in Police Custody (Channel 4); Secret Garden (BBC One); Sort Your Life Out (BBC One); The Martin Lewis Money Show Live (ITV1)
Drama Performance; Presented by Suranne Jones	Vicky McClure (as Lana Washington, Trigger Point – ITV1)	Ella Bruccoleri (as Mary Bennet, The Other Bennet Sister – BBC One); Judy Parfitt (as Sister Monica Joan, Call the Midwife – BBC One); Ruth Jones (as Elena Ravenscroft, Run Away – Netflix); Sheridan Smith (as Ann Ming, I Fought the Law – ITV1)
The Bruce Forsyth Entertainment Award; Presented by Paris & Valencia Fury	Michael McIntyre's Big Show (BBC One)	Gladiators (BBC One); The Graham Norton Show (BBC One); The Masked Singer (ITV1); Would I Lie to You? (BBC One)
Serial Drama; Presented by Teri Hatcher	Emmerdale (ITV1)	Casualty (BBC One); Coronation Street (ITV1); EastEnders (BBC One); Hollyoaks (Channel 4)
Serial Drama Performance; Presented by Natalie J. Robb & Sally Carman	Jeff Hordley (as Cain Dingle, Emmerdale – ITV1)	Aaron Thiara (as Ravi Gulati, EastEnders – BBC One); Gareth Pierce (as Todd Grimshaw, Coronation Street – ITV1); Paul Bradley (as Nigel Bates, EastEnders – BBC One); Sue Devaney (as Debbie Webster, Coronation Street – ITV1)
Comedy; Presented by Patrick Brammall	Mrs Brown's Boys (BBC One/RTÉ One)	Amandaland (BBC One); Changing Ends (ITV1); LOL: Last One Laughing UK (Prime Video); Not Going Out (BBC One)
Daytime; Presented by Olivia Attwood & Pete Wicks	This Morning (ITV1)	Good Morning Britain (ITV1); James Martin's Saturday Morning (ITV1); Loose Women (ITV1); Scam Interceptors (BBC One)
Talent Show; Presented by AJ Odudu & Will Best	Strictly Come Dancing (BBC One)	Britain's Got Talent (ITV1); The Great British Bake Off (Channel 4); The Great Celebrity Bake Off for Stand Up To Cancer (Channel 4); The Great Pottery Throw Down (Channel 4)
Special Recognition; Presented by Amanda Holden & Paloma Faith	Alan Carr	

== Multiple nominations ==
Programmes with multiple nominations
Nominations	Programme
3	Coronation Street
3	EastEnders
2	Britain's Got Talent
2	Call the Midwife
2	The Celebrity Traitors
2	Emmerdale
2	I'm a Celebrity...Get Me Out of Here!
2	I'm a Celebrity... South Africa
2	I Fought the Law
2	Limitless Win
2	The Other Bennet Sister
2	Secret Garden
2	Sort Your Life Out
2	Strictly Come Dancing
2	This Morning
2	The Traitors
2	Trigger Point

Networks with multiple nominations
Nominations	Network
29	BBC One
23	ITV1
7	Channel 4
3	Netflix
2	ITVX
2	Prime Video
