= Secret Garden (2026 TV series) =

- Genre: Nature documentary
- Narrated by: David Attenborough
- Country of origin: United Kingdom
- Original language: English
- No. of seasons: 1
- No. of episodes: 5

Production
- Executive producer: Martha Holmes Mark Brownlow Grant Mansfield
- Producer: Bill Markham
- Running time: 60 minutes
- Production company: Plimsoll Productions

Original release
- Network: BBC One
- Release: 5 April – 3 May 2026

Related
- Wild London

Secret Garden is a 2026 British nature documentary series produced by Plimsoll Productions for the BBC and The Open University, and narrated by Sir David Attenborough. The five-part series explores the hidden biodiversity and wildlife of backyards around Great Britain, featuring gardens in Oxfordshire, Bristol, the Lake District, the Wye Valley and the Western Scottish Highlands.

The series premiered in 2026 in the United Kingdom on BBC One and BBC iPlayer on 5 April, with the last part shown on 3 May, five days before Attenborough's 100th birthday.

== Episodes ==
No.	Title	Directed by	Original release date	UK viewers (millions)
1	"Oxfordshire"	Alex Ranken	5 April 2026	3.54
David Attenborough reveals how animals survive in a garden on the banks of a tributary of the River Thames - a beautiful and seemingly serene location at the mercy of unpredictable floodwaters. As winter’s high water recedes, a male kingfisher battles to survive... but his attention soon turns to attracting a mate and raising a family. A shy bank vole emerges to navigate dangers from robotic lawnmowers to predatory grass snakes. And Doris, the garden’s resident mallard, must shepherd nine ducklings safely from their treetop nest down to the river below. As spring turns to summer, mayflies appear after years underwater - they have just one day to find a mate. Daubenton’s bats catch thousands of insects each night, and Doris continues to protect her brood despite threats from otters and red kites. Sudden downpours test the animals’ resilience: kingfisher chicks face flooding in their nest, and the bank vole flees her woodland home. At least it’s nice weather for ducks. Yet this fragile Eden thrives. Britain’s wildlife is remarkably resourceful, and homeowners Henry and Sara demonstrate how leaving nature to its own devices can transform a riverbank garden into a much-needed sanctuary.
2	"Bristol"	Alex Ranken & Euan McDonald Smith	12 April 2026	3.56
In the heart of Bristol, a tiny city garden just ten metres across hosts a surprising diversity of animals. For artist Lou, it has become a refuge in the urban jungle. But for the wildlife, living alongside us is a huge challenge. In early spring, a male fox patrols a territory spanning more than a hundred gardens. Competition is fierce - for food and mates. A hungry blue tit competes with goldfinches and pigeons for a place at Lou’s birdfeeder, whilst watching out for the neighbourhood’s apex predator, Mr Fluffy - a pet cat. As the city warms, a hedgehog emerges from hibernation, travelling through a specially created “hedgehog highway” in search of Mr Right. Lou’s pond becomes a vital oasis - attracting frogs and dragonflies. Fox cubs explore neighbouring gardens, froglets emerge, and insects and spiders colonise sun-warmed walls. The blue tit family struggles to cope with city life, but much of the garden’s wildlife thrives. It is part of a green network - gardens make up a third of our city space and cover an area greater than all of Britain’s national nature reserves combined. For the hedgehog mother, the reward is great: after weeks in hiding, four healthy hoglets emerge. And the fox father teaches one of his cubs how to make a living in the modern world.
3	"The Lake District"	Alex Minton & Alex Ranken	19 April 2026	3.62
David Attenborough tells the story of Chris and Liz’s idyllic English country garden in the Lake District. Spring brings blossom and buzzing bees, but the clock is ticking for the garden’s inhabitants to find partners and raise families. At night, a field mouse uses landmarks to avoid predators while listening out for the ultrasonic calls of a mate, inaudible to predators and humans. A barn swallow returns after a six-thousand-mile migration, nesting in the same garden where he was raised. Meanwhile, a female palmate newt selects a suitor and carefully lays her eggs. Summer arrives and miniature dramas unfold. A zebra jumping spider hunts pests, a semaphore fly performs backflips to impress a mate, a mole searches for a partner, and butterflies flirt among the flowers. Over the past 20 years Britain’s flying insects have declined by 60% - and during heavy rains, their numbers drop even further, leaving swallow chicks increasingly hungry. Without a steady supply of bugs, they might not survive. Yet - through careful planning and curation - the garden’s rich habitats allow many animals to thrive. It’s a little slice of paradise for animals and people alike.
4	"The Wye Valley"	Matt Clements & Alex Minton & Alex Ranken	26 April 2026	3.52
Hidden in a steep Welsh valley, Robin, Laura, and their sons live in one of Britain’s most biodiverse woodlands. Aspect is always important to gardens, but this garden’s location means it is more affected by the seasons than most. In winter, the sun doesn’t reach the garden for months. Dormice remain in deep hibernation while tawny owls hunt rodents and court mates. But when sunlight returns, the woodland awakens. Wild garlic pushes through the soil, and a queen buff-tailed bumblebee emerges to establish a new colony. A badger mother brings her cubs above ground for the first time, and a wandering one-year-old is drawn towards the lawn by abundant food. In the stream that runs under the house, a dipper hunts aquatic insects to feed her hidden brood of hungry chicks. High in a nest-box, tawny owl chicks jostle for food, and in a brutal display of sibling rivalry, the smaller owlet pushes its larger brother from the nest. Migratory flycatchers arrive from West Africa, but poor water quality in the Wye watershed leaves the dipper family facing a shortage of food. To help, Robin provides a timely supply of mealworms, ensuring the chicks survival. Autumn means falling leaves to feed invertebrates and earthworms, enriching the soil. The bumblebee queen’s legacy passes to the next generation of queens. As winter returns, the garden falls quiet as dormice, insects, and birds retreat. If they get their timing right, all will be back next year.
5	"The Western Highlands"	Matt Clements & Alex Ranken & Euan McDonald Smith	3 May 2026	3.50
David Attenborough tells the story of a remote garden on Scotland’s rugged west coast - a carefully managed sanctuary for barn owls, pine martens, and other rare wildlife. Winter here is particularly harsh. A female buzzard is desperate for food, so homeowner Matt offers her a lifeline… but his extreme bird-feeding soon draws attention from rivals. A young pine marten arrives seeking territory. Over the years, Matt’s resident barn owl has raised ten owlets in his carefully placed nest box. This spring, her mate briefly disappears but returns, and she lays four eggs. The chicks’ survival depends on both parents supplying enough prey. Slow worms, common lizards, and toads emerge as the garden becomes a breeding hotspot. During the brief summer, crossbills feed on Scots pine seeds, house martins raise chicks under eaves and sundews trap insects near the pond. A pine marten hunts sand martins - this behaviour has never been filmed before. As autumn gales bring redwings, wildlife seeks shelter, and Matt builds dens for pine martens. With winter returning, he continues feeding his visiting animals. Decades of care have transformed the garden into a thriving ecosystem, a magical sanctuary where nature flourishes despite tough conditions.

== Reception ==
The series received broad acclaim from critics. Writing in The Guardian, Jack Seale gave the series 5 out of 5 stars, dubbing it a 'gorgeous fantasy' and praising it for capturing the 'thrilling stories' of the animal world despite remaining so close to home. Seale did, however, note that 'much of the series is ensconced in the top 1% of British home patches', thus not realistically reflecting the average British garden. Writing in The Times, Carol Midgley gave the series 4 out of 5 stars, describing it as 'magical' and praising its 'clever perspective' in storytelling.
