= Really Big Things =

- Starring: Matt Rogers
- Country of origin: United States
- Original language: English
- No. of episodes: 19

Production
- Running time: 60 minutes
- Production company: Pilgrim Films & Television

Original release
- Network: Discovery Channel
- Release: January 9 – February 13, 2007

Really Big Things is a series about massive man-made marvels like big machines, giant telescopes, skyscrapers and other massive structures. It airs on the Discovery Channel, HD Theater and Science Channel. It is now being aired on the UK version of the Discovery Channel in the early slot of 04:40am

Matt Rogers presents the show in a semi-comedy fashion, often giving the viewers the impression he is a maverick with little regard for common sense, although when faced with true danger, such as standing by a dumper truck tipping and cutting the restraining wires on a concrete mat in Season 1, he will "hand over to the professionals" or remove himself from danger.

== Episode list ==
=== Season 1 ===
No.	Title	Features	Original release date
1	"Papermaker"	Matt machine; rammer hammer; paper maker	January 9, 2007
2	"Windmill Factory"	Retractable football field; largest dump truck; windmill factory	January 16, 2007
3	"Largest Telescope"	Vertical motion simulator; blast hole drill; LBT Telescope	January 23, 2007
4	"Giant Tree Spade"	Tire recycling; largest concrete structure ever made; giant tree spider.	January 30, 2007
5	"Swing Bridge"	The Evolution locomotive in Erie; dredger on the Mississippi River; swing bridge in Seattle.	February 7, 2007
6	"Really, Really Big Show"	The Goodyear Blimp; a trash compactor in California; Cirque du Soleil in Las Vegas	February 13, 2007
