= Number One Fan (TV series) =

2026 British TV series

- Genre: Psychological thriller
- Created by: Marcus Fleming; Rachel Kilfeather
- Written by: Marcus Fleming; Rachel Kilfeather
- Directed by: Paul Wilmshurst
- Starring: Sally Lindsay; Jill Halfpenny
- Composer: Steve Lynch
- Country of origin: United Kingdom
- Original language: English
- No. of series: 1
- No. of episodes: 4

Production
- Executive producers: Mike Benson; Rachel Kilfeather; Suzi McIntosh; Paul Wilmshurst
- Producer: Brett Wilson
- Production location: United Kingdom
- Editor: John Phillipson
- Running time: 47 minutes

Original release
- Network: Channel 5
- Release: 4 May – 7 May 2026

Number One Fan is a British psychological thriller television series which premiered on 4 May 2026 on Channel 5. It stars Jill Halfpenny and Sally Lindsay.

== Synopsis ==
The series follows the story of daytime television presenter Lucy Logan (Jill Halfpenny) who is stalked by an obsessive fan named Donna (Sally Lindsay). The series themes of psychological tension and moral ambiguity. The series was described by Lindsay as a "suspenseful stalker thriller".

== Cast ==
- Jill Halfpenny as Lucy Logan
- Sally Lindsay as Donna
- Daniel Adegboyega as Shawn Logan
- Dean Andrews as Stewart Jones
- Sharlene Whyte as Mel
- Erin Shanagher as Jane Shelley
- Tiffany Gray as Tabbie
- Ben Stevenson-Langley as Ben Hughes
- Freddie Dawson as Vince
- Harvey Rhys Conway as Jacob
- Bryan Quinn as Ruari
- Sushil Chudasama as Tommy
- James O'Driscoll as Cillian Carr

== Development ==
Number One Fan was announced in January 2026. Jill Halfpenny and Sally Lindsay, who played Rebecca Hopkins and Shelley Unwin in Coronation Street, were cast in the lead roles. It is a four episode series. The series premiered on Bank Holiday Monday.

== Reception ==
Lucy Mangan in The Guardian described the series as "four hours of guaranteed, preposterous fun". The storyline was called "creepy".
