= David Baddiel: Cat Man =

- Genre: Documentary
- Presented by: David Baddiel
- Country of origin: United Kingdom
- Original language: English
- No. of series: 1
- No. of episodes: 3

Production
- Running time: 60 minutes
- Production company: Expectation

Original release
- Network: Channel 4
- Release: 16 January – 30 January 2026

David Baddiel: Cat Man is a documentary series on cats by British comedian David Baddiel, broadcast over three episodes on Channel 4 from 16 to 30 January 2026.

== Background ==
David Baddiel told The Observer in March 2022 that he had pitched a programme called David Baddiel: Cat Man, in which he would tour the United Kingdom meeting remarkable cats. He said that the series was turned down because the production company believed that cats would spend their times grooming themselves. In October 2025, Channel 4 commissioned the series; Baddiel highlighted that there were 12.5 million pet cats in the UK, in 29% of households, and they were popular on the Internet. The programme was Baddiel's first work for Channel 4 since an adaptation of his book on antisemitism, Jews Don't Count; he joked in 2022 that he wished to combat stereotypes of cats as much as stereotypes of Jews. The series was produced by Expectation and made in partnership with Everypaw Pet Insurance.

== Synopsis ==
Baddiel introduces his four cats; 15-year-old Pip dies during the filming of the first episode. He meets cats with social media followers, including Larry the Downing Street cat, and cats that take part in activities such as climbing and paddleboarding. He visits a rescue centre for disabled cats, and the cat show Supreme. Baddiel discusses cats with other cat fans including Ricky Gervais, Jonathan Ross and Lou Sanders, as well as his former housemate Frank Skinner, who dislikes cats.

== Reception ==
Georgie Wyatt of The Guardian wrote that Baddiel's love for cats was evident throughout the series. Anita Singh in The Daily Telegraph praised how the editing allowed for one-line jokes. Wyatt and Jayne Manfredi of Church Times praised the discussion of pet grief. Nicholas Harris of the New Statesman was critical of the focus on feline influencers, chats with celebrities, and cats doing unconventional activities; he deemed the show "crap and banal" and wished for a more philosophical discussion of cats.
