= University Challenge 2025–26 =

Season of a television programme

The 55th series of University Challenge began on 14 July 2025 on BBC Two, and finished on 20 April 2026, with the University of Manchester triumphing for a record-equalling fifth time, over the University of Edinburgh.

Twenty-eight teams were selected for the televised episodes, of which the University of Lincoln, Harper Adams University and Green Templeton College, Oxford made their University Challenge debuts.

== Results ==
- Winning teams are highlighted in **bold**.
- Teams with green scores (winners) returned in the next round, while those with red scores (losers) were eliminated.
- Teams with orange scores had to win one more match to return in the next round.
- Teams with yellow scores indicate that two further matches had to be played and won (teams that lost their first quarter-final match).
- A score in italics indicates a match decided on a tie-breaker question.

=== First round ===
| Team 1 | Score | | Team 2 | Total | Broadcast date |
|---|---|---|---|---|---|
| University of Sheffield | 170 | 210 | **University of Warwick** | 380 | 14 July 2025 |
| **University College London** | 210 | 170 | School of Oriental and African Studies | 380 | 21 July 2025 |
| University of Bath | 70 | 255 | **University of Southampton** | 325 | 28 July 2025 |
| University of Newcastle | 105 | 200 | **University of Edinburgh** | 305 | 4 August 2025 |
| **University of Manchester** | 170 | 150 | New College, Oxford | 320 | 11 August 2025 |
| Cardiff University | 115 | 180 | **University of Bristol** | 295 | 18 August 2025 |
| **Trinity College, Cambridge** | 210 | 115 | Linacre College, Oxford | 325 | 25 August 2025 |
| Lancaster University | 145 | 170 | **University of Lincoln** | 315 | 1 September 2025 |
| Green Templeton College, Oxford | 130 | 135 | **Darwin College, Cambridge** | 265 | 8 September 2025 |
| Trinity Hall, Cambridge | 135 | 215 | **London School of Economics** | 350 | 15 September 2025 |
| Durham University | 120 | 235 | **Merton College, Oxford** | 355 | 22 September 2025 |
| Harper Adams University | 45 | 205 | **University of Strathclyde** | 250 | 29 September 2025 |
| Imperial College London | 160 | 175 | **Churchill College, Cambridge** | 335 | 6 October 2025 |
| **Magdalen College, Oxford** | 245 | 105 | Robinson College, Cambridge | 350 | 14 October 2025 |

=== Highest scoring losers play-offs ===
| Team 1 | Score | | Team 2 | Total | Broadcast date |
|---|---|---|---|---|---|
| School of Oriental and African Studies | 115 | 220 | **Imperial College London** | 335 | 20 October 2025 |
| **University of Sheffield** | 175 | 125 | New College, Oxford | 300 | 27 October 2025 |

=== Second round ===
| Team 1 | Score | | Team 2 | Total | Broadcast date |
|---|---|---|---|---|---|
| Magdalen College, Oxford | 80 | 190 | **Darwin College, Cambridge** | 270 | 3 November 2025 |
| **University of Sheffield** | 290 | 60 | University of Strathclyde | 350 | 10 November 2025 |
| University of Southampton | 180 | 190 | **Imperial College London** | 370 | 17 November 2025 |
| University of Bristol | 145 | 180 | **University of Warwick** | 325 | 24 November 2025 |
| **University of Manchester** | 160 | 135 | London School of Economics | 295 | 1 December 2025 |
| Trinity College, Cambridge | 150 | 180 | **University of Edinburgh** | 330 | 8 December 2025 |
| University of Lincoln | 85 | 190 | **University College London** | 275 | 15 December 2025 |
| Churchill College, Cambridge | 115 | 180 | **Merton College, Oxford** | 295 | 5 January 2026 |

=== Quarter-finals ===
| Team 1 | Score | | Team 2 | Total | Broadcast date |
|---|---|---|---|---|---|
| University of Manchester | 80 | 195 | **University of Edinburgh** | 275 | 12 January 2026 |
| University College London | 150 | 160 | **Merton College, Oxford** | 310 | 19 January 2026 |
| Darwin College, Cambridge | 115 | 155 | **University of Sheffield** | 270 | 26 January 2026 |
| **Imperial College London** | 190 | 105 | University of Warwick | 295 | 2 February 2026 |
| **University of Edinburgh** | 105 | 85 | Merton College, Oxford | 190 | 23 February 2026 |
| **University of Manchester** | 150 | 120 | University College London | 270 | 2 March 2026 |
| University of Sheffield | 120 | 160 | **Imperial College London** | 280 | 9 March 2026 |
| **Darwin College, Cambridge** | 175 | 125 | University of Warwick | 300 | 16 March 2026 |
| **University of Manchester** | 185 | 135 | University of Sheffield | 320 | 23 March 2026 |
| Merton College, Oxford | 130 | 175 | **Darwin College, Cambridge** | 305 | 30 March 2026 |

=== Semi-finals ===
| Team 1 | Score | | Team 2 | Total | Broadcast date |
|---|---|---|---|---|---|
| **University of Edinburgh** | 155 | 110 | Darwin College, Cambridge | 265 | 6 April 2026 |
| Imperial College London | 70 | 250 | **University of Manchester** | 320 | 13 April 2026 |

=== Final ===
| Team 1 | Score | | Team 2 | Total | Broadcast date |
|---|---|---|---|---|---|
| University of Edinburgh | 105 | 145 | **University of Manchester** | 250 | 20 April 2026 |

- For their first title since 2013, the winning Manchester team consisted of Ray Power, Kirsty Dickson, Kai Madgwick (who got all nine of their team's starters-for-ten in the final) and Rob Faulkner, who beat the Edinburgh team of Parthav Easwar, Johnny Richards, Alice Leonard, and Rayhana Amjad.
- The trophy and title were presented by Miriam Margolyes, on location at the Clapham Grand.

== Spin-off: Christmas Special 2025 ==
A spin-off Christmas series has been aired since 2011, featuring distinguished alumni. For the 2025 series, to mark the fifteenth edition of the Christmas version of the show, one team from each prior series was invited back to have another go, in break of the tradition of inviting new famous graduates.

=== First round ===
Out of seven first-round winners, only the top four highest-scoring teams progress to the semi-finals.

- Winning teams are highlighted in **bold**.
- Teams with green scores (winners) returned in the next round, while those with red scores (losers) were eliminated.
- Teams with grey scores won their match but did not achieve a high enough score to proceed to the next round.
- A score in italics indicates a match decided on a tie-breaker question.

| Team 1 | Score | | Team 2 | Total | Broadcast date |
|---|---|---|---|---|---|
| **Durham University** | 200 | 140 | University of Manchester | 340 | 22 December 2025 |
| **University College London** | 235 | 70 | University of Leeds | 305 | 23 December 2025 |
| **Keble College, Oxford** | 275 | 85 | University of Hull | 360 | 24 December 2025 |
| University of Bristol | 55 | 260 | **Trinity College, Cambridge** | 315 | 26 December 2025 |
| **Exeter College, Oxford** | 150 | 145 | Trinity Hall, Cambridge | 295 | 28 December 2025 |
| St Hilda's College, Oxford | 130 | 185 | **University of Edinburgh** | 315 | 29 December 2025 |
| Middlesex University | 80 | 160 | **University of Lancaster** | 240 | 30 December 2025 |

=== Semi-finals ===
| Team 1 | Score | | Team 2 | Total | Broadcast date |
|---|---|---|---|---|---|
| University College London | 115 | 170 | **Keble College, Oxford** | 285 | 31 December 2025 |
| **Durham University** | 185 | 125 | Trinity College, Cambridge | 310 | 1 January 2026 |

=== Final ===
| Team 1 | Score | | Team 2 | Total | Broadcast date |
|---|---|---|---|---|---|
| Keble College, Oxford | 115 | 165 | **Durham University** | 280 | 2 January 2026 |

Taking the honours for the second year in a row, the winning Durham University team consisted of Liz James, Tracey MacLeod, Carla Denyer, and Sophia Smith Galer, who beat the Keble College, Oxford team of Paul Johnson, Frank Cottrell-Boyce, Anne-Marie Imafidon and Caroline Criado Perez.
