= Lucy Worsley's Victorian Murder Club =

2026 British TV crime series

- Genre: Documentary
- Presented by: Lucy Worsley
- Starring: Lucy Worsley; Nadifa Mohamed; Kate Lister; Rose Wallis; Sarah Bax Horton
- Country of origin: United Kingdom
- Original language: English
- No. of series: 1
- No. of episodes: 3

Production
- Running time: 60 minutes
- Production company: Wall to Wall Media

Original release
- Network: BBC Two
- Release: 5 January – 19 January 2026

Lucy Worsley's Victorian Murder Club is a British historical documentary television series which premiered on 5 January 2026 on BBC Two and BBC iPlayer. The show is presented by historian Lucy Worsley and was produced by Wall to Wall Media.

== Programme ==
In the series, Worsley researches the infamous Thames Torso Murders of the late 19th century. The murders involved the bodies of multiple women which were found dismembered in the vicinity of the River Thames in London between 1887 and 1889, crimes which went unsolved for 130 years. These murders faded into obscurity compared to those committed by Jack the Ripper who was also unidentified. Worsley reviews the suspects, discusses new theories about the identity of the killer, consults with forensic pathologists and psychologists, including historian Sarah Bax Horton, and assembles a team to form her own Murder Club. In the episodes, the sexism of the era is highlighted as different leads are investigated. The series concludes with a presentation of who the Murder Club believe was the murderer. Worsley told The Times “I think there’s a very compelling case that we’ve got the guy”.

== Production ==
The documentary was produced by Wall to Wall Media. In October 2025, BBC Factual commissioned the documentary series.

== Cast ==
- Lucy Worsley
- Nadifa Mohamed
- Kate Lister
- Rose Wallis
- Sarah Bax Horton

== Episodes ==
Series
Episode	Ref.
Episode 1	
Episode 2	
Episode 3	

== Reception ==
A review in The Spectator Australia called the series "rather impressive".
