= Hans Obma =

American actor

- Born: La Crosse, Wisconsin, US
- Education: University of Wisconsin–Madison
- Occupations: actor, director and writer
- Years active: 2008–present

Hans Obma is an American actor, director and writer known for his appearances in television programmes including The Vampire Diaries (2013) and Better Call Saul (2015).

== Biography ==
Hans Obma was born in La Crosse, Wisconsin. His grandmother was originally from Brynmawr, Blaenau Gwent, Wales and moved to the United States after World War II. He graduated from University of Wisconsin–Madison. Obma is known as an actor, director and writer. Obma appeared in The Vampire Diaries and Better Call Saul. He also portrayed roles in Grace and Frankie, WandaVision and May December. In April 2026, it was announced that he would be joining the cast of the Welsh soap opera Pobol y Cwm. This was after learning the Welsh language during the COVID-19 pandemic. He studied the language in a course at Cardiff University.

== Filmography ==
Year	Title	Role	Notes
2008	Turning Point, Graf Zeppelin	Ensign Braun	
2008	Into the Red	December	Short film
2009	Writer's Block	Fabricio	Short film
2010	General Hospital	Horvat (uncredited)	TV series
2010	The Debuttered	Bossman (voice)	Short film
2011	The Ally	German #1 (voice)	Short film
2012	2 Jacks	Peter	
2012	Criminal Minds	Nathan Eades	TV series
2012	Youthful Daze	Doctor Willis	TV series
2013	Switched at Birth	Art Appraiser	TV series
2013	The Superman	Raskolnikov	Short film
2013	The Vampire Diaries	Gregor	TV series
2013	Aftermath	Shemayev	Short film
2014	The Arroyo	Carl	Film
2014	Our Hopeful Journey	The Wanderer	Short film
2014	Triangular	Kevin	Short film
2015	Hotwire	Stan	Short film
2016	Phone it in	The Stranger	Short film
2016	Independence Day: Resurgence	Sokolov (uncredited)	Film
2016	Liability	Jeff Book	Short film
2017	Rekindled	Lawyer 3	Short film
2017	Turn: Washington's Spies	Admiral de Grasse	
2017	Get Shorty	Farkas	
2017	NCIS: New Orleans	Hans Mattis	
2017	Family	Sergei	Short film
2018	The Resident	Dobroslav Charmain	
2018	Muddy Waters	Professor	Short film
2018–2020	Better Call Saul	Adrian	TV series
2020	The Summer Day	Man	Short film
2021	WandaVision	Hydra Scientist	
2021	Grace and Frankie	Hummer Von Vluckinshloker	
2021	Narcos: Mexico	The Cadillac Man	
2022	A Question of Service	Joseph Gard	
2022	A Doll's House	Nils Krogstad	
2023	The Rookie	Hamza Young	
2023	May December	Roberto	
2023	All Rise	Ivan Kirilenko	
2023	Obliterated	Lucas	
2024	For All Mankind	Jan Hubner	
2025	S.W.A.T.	Ronin Markov	
2025	Monster	Vice Commandant	
2026	Pobol y Cwm	Kyle	
