= There Goes the Neighborhood (TV series) =

- Presented by: Matt Rogers
- Opening theme: There Goes the Neighborhood, performed by Eric Martin
- Country of origin: United States
- No. of seasons: 1
- No. of episodes: 7

Production
- Executive producers: Jay Bienstock; Mike Fleiss
- Running time: 60 minutes
- Production companies: Next Entertainment; Jay Bienstock Productions; Warner Horizon Television

Original release
- Network: CBS
- Release: August 9 – September 13, 2009

There Goes the Neighborhood (originally to be titled Block Party) is an American prime-time reality television program on CBS. The show premiered on August 9, 2009, and features eight suburban families shut out from the outside world with no television, internet, phones, or contact with anybody outside of their neighborhood. The families wcompeted in challenges against each other. Each week, one family was banished from the neighborhood, thereby eliminating the family from contention for the show's $250,000 prize fund. The show's executive producers were Jay Bienstock and Mike Fleiss. The show's presenter was Matt Rogers, a finalist on American Idol 3.

== Production ==
The show was recorded in Kennesaw, Georgia, a suburb of Atlanta, specifically on the 2500 block of Fairlawn Downs NW in the Legacy Park community's Annandale Main. For the program, producers built a 20-foot (6 m) tall wall around the competitors' neighborhood to enforce their isolation from the outside world. Electricity and gas utilities for most household luxuries were cut off from each family's home.

Production for the show began in early June 2009. The families being placed into lockdown within the constructed barriers beginning on June 15.

== Contestants ==
Family name	Family members	Status
DeGirolamo	Jeff, 46, Father; Lisa, 44, Mother; Greg, 16, Son; Chris, 12, Son	Eliminated 1st on August 9, 2009
Southey	Laurie, 38, Mother; Haley, 15, Daughter	Eliminated 2nd on August 16, 2009
Bussiere	Tom, 45, Father; Susan, 42, Mother; Elise, 7, Daughter; Jake, 5, Son; Marcia, 74, Grandmother	Eliminated 3rd on August 23, 2009
Nelson	Chris, 47, Father; Mickey, 47, Mother; Christian, 19, Son; Branson, 15, Son; Jackson, 7, Son	Eliminated 4th on August 30, 2009
Mullennix	Clarissa "Chris", 41, Mother; Renee, 42, Mother; Nathanael, 18, Son; Keith, 17, Son	Eliminated 5th on September 6, 2009
Upshaw	Ricardo, 42, Father; Therese, 42, Mother; Christopher, 21, Son; Alexus, 18, Daughter	Eliminated 6th on September 13, 2009
Schindler	David, 40, Father; Christina, 39, Mother; Noah, 12, Son; Emmett, 10, Son; Olivia, 6, Daughter	Runner-Up
Johnston	Cameron, 51, Father; Regina, 44, Mother; Carliegh, 11, Daughter; Theresa, 25, Niece	Winners

== Gameplay ==
The program's gameplay is extremely similar to that of the American version of Big Brother (specifically Big Brother 2). In each episode, families will compete in a challenge in order to win rewards and safety from elimination. The winner will name two families to face the neighbourhood vote. The families will then vote to force one family to leave the neighborhood for the remainder of the series. In the finale, it is presumed that the six eliminated families will return to the neighborhood to vote for the show's winner.

== Voting table ==
The voting table below records whom each family voted to stay during its time in the neighborhood. The nominated families are not allowed to vote.

	Week 1	Week 2	Week 3	Week 4	Week 5	Week 6	Finale
Kings of the Neighborhood	Nelson	Mullennix	Upshaw	Upshaw	Upshaw	Johnston	—N/a
Nominated	Mullennix; DeGirolamo	Schindler; Southey	Schindler; Bussiere	Johnston; Nelson	Schindler; Mullenix	Schindler; Upshaw	—N/a
Johnston	Mullennix	Schindler	Schindler	Nominated	Schindler	Schindler	Winners $250,000
Schindler	Mullennix	Nominated	Nominated	Johnston	Nominated	Nominated	Runners-Up (Week 8)
Upshaw	Mullennix	Schindler	Schindler	Johnston	Schindler	Nominated	Eliminated (Week 6)
Mullennix	Nominated	Schindler	Schindler	Nelson	Nominated	Eliminated (Week 5)	
Nelson	Mullennix	Schindler	Schindler	Nominated	Eliminated (Week 4)		
Bussiere	Mullennix	Schindler	Nominated	Eliminated (Week 3)			
Southey	DeGirolamo	Nominated	Eliminated (Week 2)				
DeGirolamo	Nominated	Eliminated (Week 1)					
Eliminated	DeGirolamo; 1 of 6 votes to stay	Southey; 0 of 5 votes to stay	Bussiere; 0 of 4 votes to stay	Nelson; 1 of 3 votes to stay	Mullennix; 0 of 2 votes to stay	Upshaws chosen by Johnstons	Schindler 3 of 24 votes (13%) to win
Eliminated	DeGirolamo; 1 of 6 votes to stay	Southey; 0 of 5 votes to stay	Bussiere; 0 of 4 votes to stay	Nelson; 1 of 3 votes to stay	Mullennix; 0 of 2 votes to stay	Upshaws chosen by Johnstons	Johnston 21 of 24 votes (87%) to win
Source							

== See also ==
- The Neighbourhood, a 2026 British reality game show, featuring households competing against each other while living in a purpose-built neighbourhood, hosted by Graham Norton.
