= Schooled (British TV series) =

- Genre: Sitcom
- Created by: Delia-René Donaldson
- Country of origin: United Kingdom
- Original language: English
- No. of series: 1
- No. of episodes: 6

Production
- Executive producer: Afolabi Kuti
- Production company: Broedmachine

Original release
- Network: Channel 4

Schooled is an upcoming British comedy television series created by Delia-René Donaldson for Channel 4.

== Cast ==
- Shiloh Coke as Kayleigh Clarke
- Munya Chawawa as T
- Charithra Chandran as Lara
- Judi Love as Anita
- Michelle de Swarte as Naomi
- Rebecca Humphries
- Alex Bhat
- Elliot Barnes-Worrell

== Production ==
Delia-René Donaldson created Schooled based on her own real life experiences working in pastoral care at a London school. In May 2025, Channel 4 commissioned the six-part series, executive produced by Afolabi Kuti for Broedmachine in addition to Group M Motion Entertainment's Diverse Indies Fund.

In August 2025, it was announced Munya Chawawa and Shiloh Coke would star in the series alongside Charithra Chandran, Judi Love and Michelle de Swarte. Also joining the cast were Rebecca Humphries, Alex Bhat and Elliot Barnes-Worrell.

Principal photography took place in 2025.
