= Michael Palin in the Philippines =

- Genre: Travel documentary
- Presented by: Michael Palin
- Country of origin: United Kingdom
- Original language: English
- No. of series: 1
- No. of episodes: 3

Production
- Running time: 60 minutes (including advertisements)
- Production company: ITN

Original release
- Network: 5
- Release: 28 September – 12 October 2026

Michael Palin in the Philippines is a 2026 television travel documentary presented by Michael Palin and first aired on 5 in the United Kingdom in three episodes from 28 September to 12 October 2026.

== Synopsis ==
Palin arrives in Manila, the capital of the Philippines, where he witnesses celebrations of 40 years since the removal from power of Ferdinand and Imelda Marcos, and protests against the current government led by their son Bongbong Marcos. He meets Bongbong Marcos, who has already said he will not answer sensitive questions, at the Malacañang Palace. The president reveals he has been a fan of Monty Python since his time at boarding school in England in the 1970s, and asks Palin questions about The Fish-Slapping Dance.

Later, Palin visits El Nido, an island becoming popular with tourists. He takes a military flight to Thitu Island in the South China Sea, known locally as Pagasa in the West Philippine Sea, a small island involved in an international dispute with China.

In the second episode, Palin visits the Cebu Detention Center, where inmates are ordered to dance in the courtyard for exercise.

In the third episode, Palin visits the island of Mindanao, visiting sites where the British Foreign, Commonwealth and Development Office advise against all travel. He visits Marawi, destroyed in 2017 by Islamic extremists, and Jolo, an island that was once home to the Abu Sayyaf group.

== Reception ==
Jack Seale of The Guardian gave a four-star review. Benji Wilson wrote a review of the same score in The Daily Telegraph, finding Palin to be mentally and physically agile at age 83, but wondering if a different presenter would have asked more questions to Bongbong Marcos. Brian Beacom of The Herald praised the series and contrasted it with Eva Longoria in Searching for France on the BBC. BBC Radio 5 Live's Must Watch podcast found the series to be pleasant but less informative than Palin's other series, and found the meeting with Bongbong Marcos to be uninformative.

== Book and tour ==
Palin wrote a book of the same title to accompany the series. After an injury from a domestic fall, he cancelled the tour in October 2026.
