= Force of Nature (TV series) =

- Genre: Documentary
- Country of origin: United Kingdom
- Original language: English
- No. of series: 1
- No. of episodes: 6

Production
- Running time: 60 minutes (including advertisements)
- Production companies: ITV Studios, ARD

Original release
- Network: ITV1
- Release: 26 July – 30 August 2026

Force of Nature is a 2026 television natural history documentary series. A co-production between ITV Studios in the UK and ARD in Germany, it consists of six episodes broadcast between 26 July and 30 August 2026. The series documents the effects of climate change on nature.

== Production ==
The series was announced in February 2025 under the working title Extreme Planet Earth. The studio Plimsoll Productions had previously made the nature series A Year on Planet Earth and A Real Bug's Life. The documentary took three years to make. Producer Simon Muriel recalled that the observation of drought-affected chimpanzees in Senegal required the crew to walk over 20 kilometres per day with equipment in 40° C heat.

Producer Seb Illis wanted to show the impact of climate change to the broad audience of ITV without it being "a lecture or anything preachy". He said that it was important to show the effects on interactions between humans and wild animals, including footage in which a snow leopard descends from a warming mountain and hunts a domesticated dog.

== Reception ==
Sarah Dempster of The Guardian gave the series a three-star review. She praised the photography, but found the narration by Andrew Lincoln to sound like a disaster film. Academics Jim McQuaid, Hannah Cloke and Hayley Fowler collectively wrote on The Conversation that the series could bring mainstream attention to the effect of climate change on nature, just as Blue Planet II had done for plastic pollution. They praised the focus on the animals' resilience rather than fatalism.
