= Matthew Rogers =

American television host and singer (born 1978)

Matt Rogers
- Born: Matthew Wyatt Rogers; September 16, 1978 (age 47); Rancho Cucamonga, California, U.S.
- Genres: Pop, country
- Instrument: Vocals
- Years active: 2004–present
- Website: http://www.MattRogersUSA.com

Matthew Wyatt "Matt" Rogers (born September 16, 1978) is an American television host and country singer. He was also one of the finalists on the third season of the reality/talent-search television series American Idol, he became a television host with series Really Big Things and There Goes the Neighborhood.

== Personal ==
Rogers is a native and a resident of Rancho Cucamonga, California. He began singing at age 5. Rogers attended Sierra Vista Middle School in Covina, California and South Hills High School in West Covina, California, where he played football. He went on to play college football at the University of Washington, where he was an offensive lineman on their 2001 Rose Bowl championship team.

== Career ==
On March 24, 2004, Rogers became the second of the 12 finalists to be voted off of American Idol. Since his appearance on American Idol, Rogers has served as co-host for American Idol Extra and worked as a correspondent on several sports and entertainment shows, including Turner Sports College Football, The Best Damn Sports Show Period, Access Hollywood, Entertainment Tonight, and American Idol. Rogers guest appeared on the 'Idols' edition of Family Feud.

Rogers was the host for the Discovery Channel shows Really Big Things in 2007, and There Goes the Neighborhood in 2009. As of August 2012, he hosts Beat the Chefs on Game Show Network. Rogers is best known for hosting “Coming Home,” a reality docu-series on Lifetime which followed the surprise reunions of military members and their loved ones, as they returned home from active duty. Matt put his songwriting experience into play by writing and performing the theme song for “Coming Home” titled “I’m Coming Home,” which has since served as a voice for the experience of military families around the country. He also stars in a series of commercials for Bosley Hair Restoration.

On October 16, 2015, Rogers appeared as the new host of Discovery Channel's Gold Rush – The Dirt.

== American Idol performances ==
- "What You Won't Do for Love" (Bobby Caldwell, 1979) (Semifinals; February 17, 2004)
- "Hard to Handle" (Otis Redding) (Soul week; March 16, 2004)
- "Amazed" (Lonestar, 2000) (Country; March 23, 2004) (Bottom 3; voted off)
