= Wild London =

2026 television episode

- Genre: Nature documentary
- Directed by: Joe Loncraine
- Presented by: David Attenborough
- Country of origin: United Kingdom
- Original language: English
- No. of episodes: 1

Production
- Production location: London
- Production company: Passion Planet

Original release
- Network: BBC One
- Release: 1 January 2026

Wild London is a 2026 one-off BBC nature documentary directed by Joe Loncraine and narrated by David Attenborough.

It shows the wildlife of London, including deer, red foxes, Aesculapian snakes, hedgehogs, parakeets and peregrine falcons. It was broadcast in the UK on the evening of New Year's Day 2026.
