= Tiger Island (TV series) =

2026 television episode

- Genre: Nature documentary
- Presented by: Anna Dimitriadis; Dan O'Neill
- Country of origin: United Kingdom
- Original language: English
- No. of episodes: 2

Production
- Producer: Patrick Evans
- Production location: Nepal
- Running time: 2 x 60 min.
- Production company: BBC Natural History Unit

Original release
- Network: BBC One
- Release: 7 June – 14 June 2026

Tiger Island is a 2026 BBC two-part nature documentary series about a group of tigers living on a small island in Nepal.

== Synopsis ==
The series is focused on a group of tigers living on a river island in Nepal measuring just 4 km^{2} (1.5 sq mi). The group includes several adult tigers, including mothers with cubs. It was filmed by a team of wildlife filmmakers and big cat experts.

The documentary includes footage that is thought to be "the first recorded case of a tiger caring for another mother's cubs in the wild", when one mother, whom they called Goma, who has two cubs, took care of three extra cubs from a different mother, Jugini, while she was a little way away.

== Cast ==
- Anna Dimitriadis (presenter)
- Dan O'Neill (presenter)
- Amrita Acharia (narrator)

== Production ==
The series was co-presented by wildlife television presenter, field biologist, and filmmaker Dan O'Neill and Anna Dimitriadis. It was produced by Patrick Evans for the BBC Studios Natural History Unit for the BBC and PBS in the US.

The series producer in the UK is Matthew Wright, production manager Helen Wallbank, and executive producer Roger Webb. For PBS Nature produced by The WNET Group the series producer is Bill Murphy, executive producer Fred Kaufman, and series editor Janet Hess.

The filmmakers spent two months observing the tigers, using their unique stripe patterns to identify individuals. Nepalese wildlife trackers and guides, sisters Sushila and Manju Mahatra, were an essential part of making the documentary.

Drones were used to capture aerial footage, and thermal cameras were used for filming at night.

== Release and distribution ==
The series premiered on 7 June 2026 on BBC One and BBC iPlayer, with the second episode airing on 14 June.

BBC Studios is responsible for global sales.

== Reception ==
The series was very successful, with the first episode attracting 2.7 million viewers in the UK and being the subject of praise on social media.

Holly Richardson wrote in The Guardian: "It is genuinely joyous to see them experience this: 'It is incredible to be stared at by a tiger like that'."
