= List of people associated with Corpus Christi College, Oxford =

This is a list of notable people affiliated with Corpus Christi College, University of Oxford, England. It includes former students, current and former academics and fellows. This list of alumni consists almost entirely of men, because women were not allowed to study at the college from its foundation in 1517 until 1979.

== Notable former students ==
=== Academics ===
- Max Beloff, Baron Beloff – historian and Conservative peer
- Isaiah Berlin – social and political theorist, philosopher and historian of ideas
- G. E. Berrios – Professor of Psychiatry, Cambridge University
- Charles Otto Blagden – linguist
- William Buckland – geologist and palaeontologist
- John Y. Campbell – economist
- Edmund Kerchever Chambers – literary scholar
- Catherine Conybeare – Professor of Classics and author
- Sir Steven Cowley FRS – theoretical physicist (and former President of Corpus)
- Thomas James Dunbabin – classicist scholar and archaeologist
- Mark Edwards – scholar of Patristics, the New Testament, early Church history and Later Roman philosophy
- Richard Ellis – astronomer and cosmologist
- Henry Furneaux – classical scholar specialising in Tacitus
- Herbert Paul Grice – philosopher of language
- Francesca Happé – professor of cognitive neuroscience at the Institute of Psychiatry, King's College London
- William V. Harris – William R. Shepherd Professor of History at Columbia University
- Charles Henderson – historian of Cornwall
- Richard Hooker – 16th-century theologian
- Simon Johnson – Nobel Memorial Prize-winning economist
- Jonathan A. Jones – Professor of Physics, Oxford University
- Clyde Kluckhohn – American Rhodes Scholar, anthropologist
- Ilya Kuprov – Professor of Physics, University of Southampton
- Patrick McTaggart-Cowan – Canadian meteorologist and the first president of Simon Fraser University
- Roger Moorey – antiquarian and former Keeper of Antiquities, Ashmolean Museum
- Judith Mossman – Professor of Classics at the University of Nottingham
- Thomas Nagel – American philosopher whose main areas of interest are philosophy of mind, political philosophy and ethics
- Henry Nettleship – classical scholar
- G. E. L. Owen – classicist and philosopher
- J. I. Packer – British-born Canadian Christian theologian
- Edward Pococke – Orientalist and biblical scholar
- Robert Proctor – Bibliographer
- John Rainolds – academic and churchman
- Boris Rankov – professor of Roman history at Royal Holloway, University of London
- Basil William Robinson – Asian art scholar and author
- John Ruskin – art critic, watercolourist, prominent social thinker and philanthropist
- Marc Stears - political theorist, director of the University College London policy lab
- Gail Trimble – senior faculty member in Classics at Trinity College, Oxford
- Tsatsu Tsikata – former University of Ghana law lecturer and head of Ghana National Petroleum Company
- Juan Luis Vives – scholar and humanist
- Patrick Maxwell – Regius Professor of Physic at the University of Cambridge Science
- Sir Bernard Williams – moral philosopher, former Provost of King's College, Cambridge

=== Educators ===
- Thomas Arnold – educator and historian, headmaster of Rugby School from 1828 to 1841
- Sir John Francis Lockwood Master of Birkbeck College, London, 1951–1965; Vice-Chancellor of the University of London, 1955-1958
- John Rosewell – Headmaster of Eton College

=== Musicians, artists and writers ===
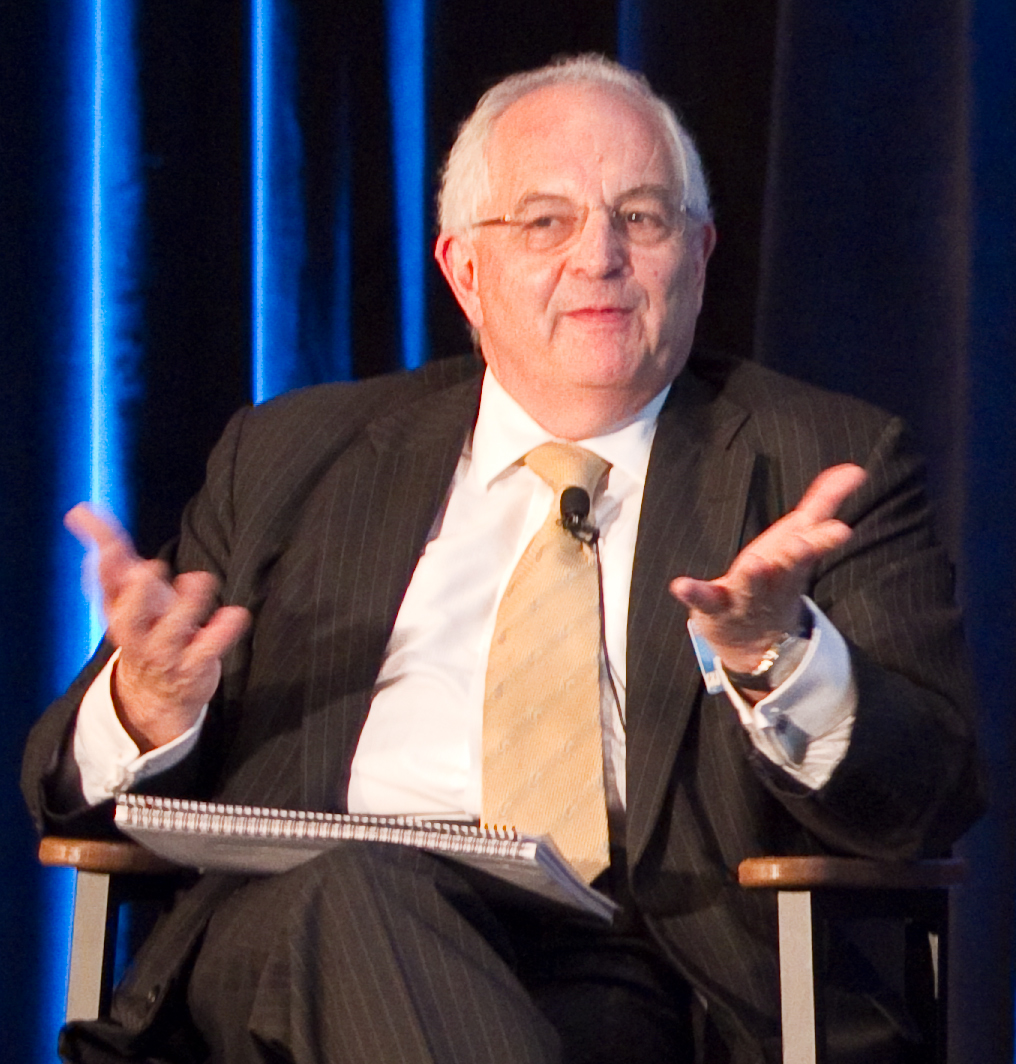
Martin Wolf.

- Al Alvarez – poet, novelist, essayist and critic
- Lucy Atkins – journalist and author
- Gerard Baker – former editor-in-chief, Wall Street Journal
- Roy Beddington – painter, illustrator, novelist, journalist, and poet
- Alex Bellos – journalist and author
- Patrick Bishop – journalist and author
- Ian Bostridge – tenor singer
- Robert Bridges – British poet, and poet laureate from 1913 to 1930.
- Hassan Damluji – author and international development expert
- Geoff Dyer – writer
- Richard Edwardes – writer and composer
- Rebecca Fortnum - painter
- Toby Harnden – journalist and author
- Alfred William Hunt – painter
- Charles H. M. Kerr – artist
- MC Lars – musician
- Robert Liddell – literary critic, biographer, novelist, travel writer and poet
- Camilla Long – The Sunday Times journalist
- Henry Newbolt – poet, novelist and historian
- George Sandys - poet and adventurer
- C. P. Scott – journalist, publisher and politician
- Vikram Seth – Indian novelist and poet
- F. H. S. Shepherd – painter
- Harriet Tyce – author
- Nicholas Udall – playwright, cleric, and schoolmaster
- Jane Wilson-Howarth – author and physician

=== Politicians, civil servants and lawyers ===
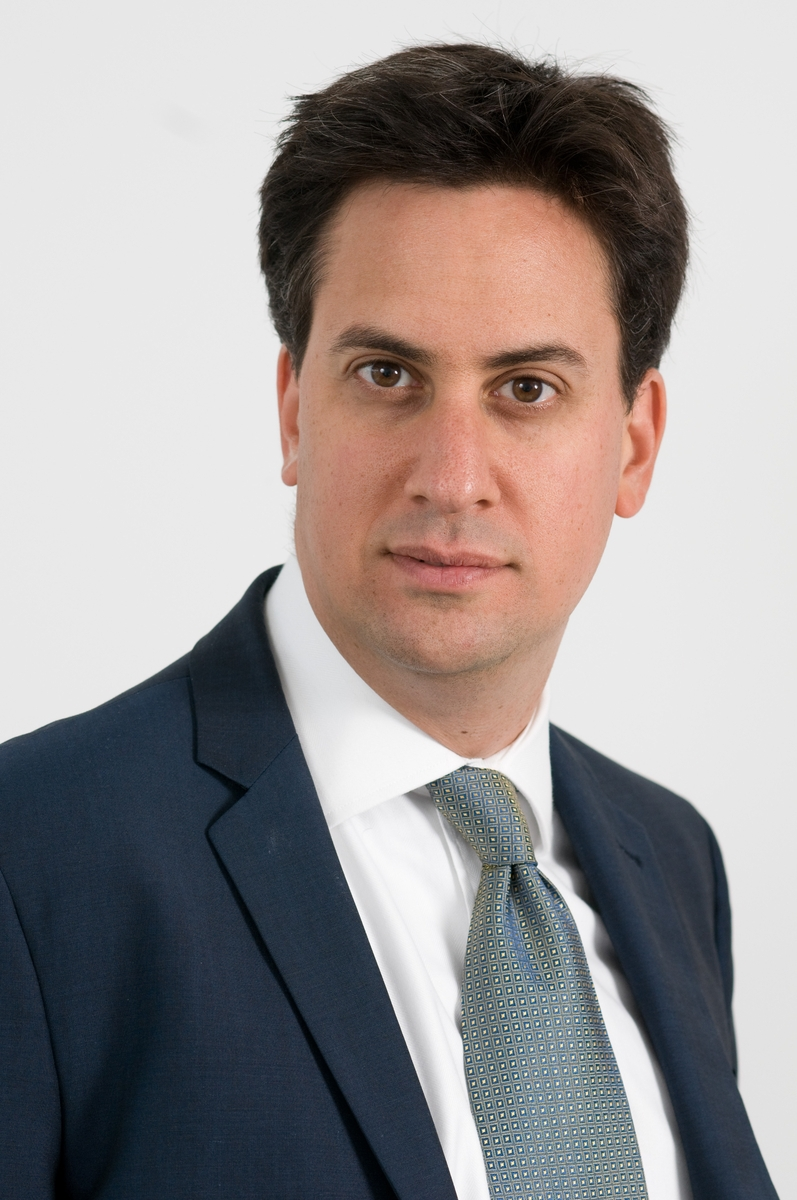
Ed Miliband.

- Ben Cannon – American teacher and politician from Oregon
- Chen Show Mao – Singaporean Rhodes Scholar, corporate lawyer and Singapore Member of Parliament
- Gerard Clauson – British civil servant, businessman, and orientalist
- David Curry – British Conservative Party politician. He was the Member of Parliament (MP) for Skipton and Ripon from 1987 to 2010
- Stephen Doughty – British Labour Party politician. Member of Parliament (MP) for Cardiff South and Penarth from 2012.
- David Hartley – signatory to the Treaty of Paris
- Jon Harvey (alias Count Binface) – a candidate for Uxbridge and South Ruislip in the 2019 United Kingdom general election against incumbent prime minister Boris Johnson.
- Sir Jeremy Johnson – High Court judge
- Tom Kent - British-born Canadian journalist and public servant who served as a senior adviser to Canadian Prime Minister Lester B. Pearson.
- Stephen Lovegrove – civil servant and the Permanent Secretary of the Ministry of Defence.
- David Miliband – Secretary of State for Foreign Affairs (2007—2010) and Labour leadership candidate (September 2010)
- Ed Miliband – Secretary of State for Energy and Climate Change (2008—2010) and Labour leader
- David Normington – Permanent Secretary at the Home Office
- Sir Christopher Nugee QC – High Court judge
- Sergio Ugalde - Diplomat and International Criminal Court Judge
- James Oglethorpe – British general, Member of Parliament, philanthropist, and founder of the colony of Georgia.
- Richard Pate – landowner and Member of Parliament for Gloucester in the Parliament of 1559 and 1563-1567
- David Pearey - Former Governor of the British Virgin Islands
- Sir Pushpinder Singh Saini – High Court judge
- Sir Edwyn Sandys – politician and founder member of the Virginia Company
- William Waldegrave, Baron Waldegrave of North Hill – Conservative politician who served in the Cabinet (1990–1997)

=== Clergy ===
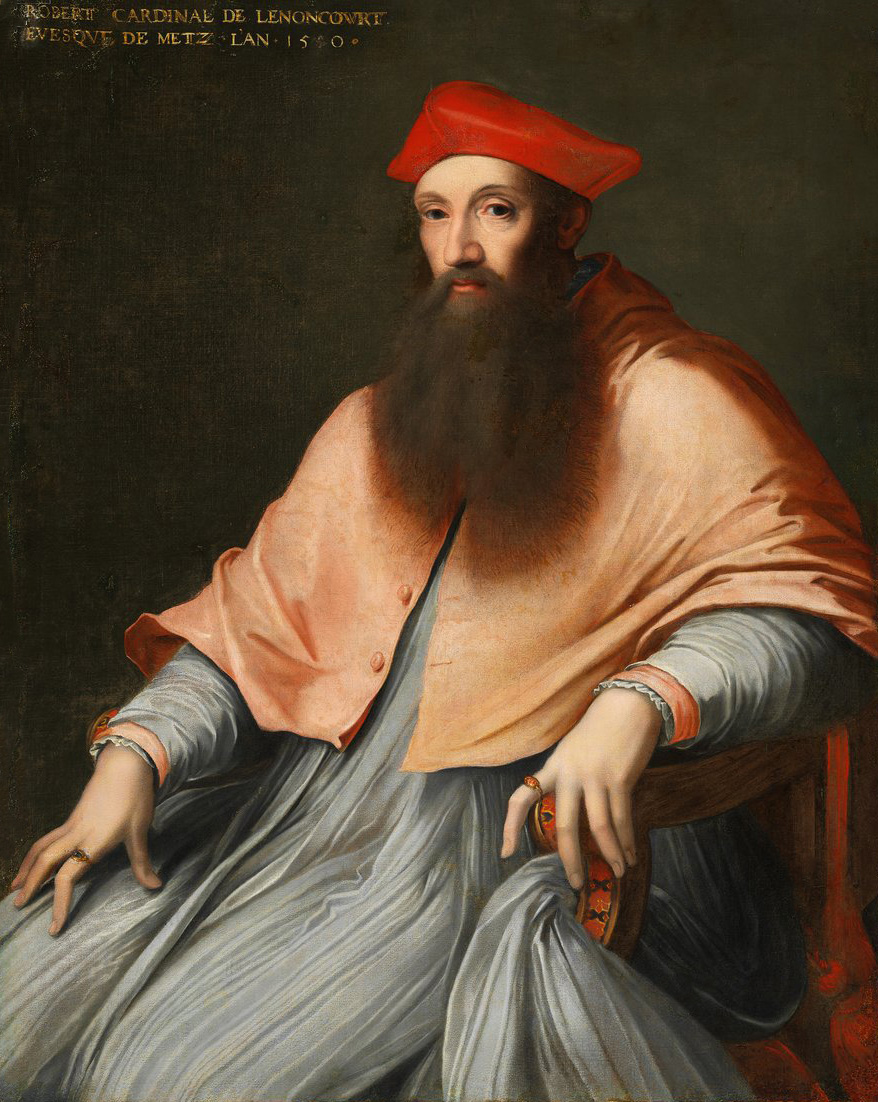
Cardinal Reginald Pole.

- Derek Browning – Moderator of the General Assembly of the Church of Scotland (2017–18)
- Francis Chavasse - Anglican Bishop of Liverpool, founder of St Peter's College, Oxford, father of Noel Godfrey Chavasse VC & Bar, MC.
- John Keble – churchman and poet, gave his name to Keble College, Oxford
- Henry Phillpotts – Anglican Bishop of Exeter from 1830 to 1869
- Reginald Pole – cardinal, last Catholic Archbishop of Canterbury
- John Penrose – clergyman and theological writer

=== Broadcasters ===
- Michael Cockerell – political commentator and broadcaster
- Kenneth Kendall – BBC newscaster

=== Other people ===
- Flight Lieutenant Dominic Bruce OBE MC AFM KSG, a British Royal Air Force officer, known as the "Medium Sized Man"
- Sam Kay – caused the college's University Challenge 2009 team to be disqualified as champions
- Hector Sants – Chief Executive Officer of the Financial Services Authority (2007—2012)
- Michael Spencer – businessman; the chief executive of ICAP plc
- Anna Jewsbury – fashion designer
- Nicholas Wadham – benefactor of Wadham College, Oxford.

== Fellows and academics ==
- Michael Brock – historian, Fellow
- William Cole – clergyman, President of Corpus Christi College, Oxford and Dean of Lincoln
- Sunanda K. Datta-Ray – Indian newspaperman and journalist, supernumerary fellow
- Sir Kenneth Dover – classical scholar and academic, President of Corpus Christi College (1981–2005)
- Henry Furneaux – classical scholar specialising in Tacitus
- Andrew Glyn – Fellow and Tutor in Economics
- Sir Brian Harrison – editor, Oxford Dictionary of National Biography
- Peter Hore – Fellow and Tutor in Chemistry
- Thomas Hornsby – astronomer and mathematician, Fellow 1760
- Judith Maltby – Chaplain and Fellow, church historian
- Jim Mauldon – Fellow, Tutor in Mathematics, Dean
- G. E. L. Owen – classicist and philosopher
- Edward Pococke – orientalist and biblical scholar, Fellow (1682)
- J. O. Urmson – philosopher and classicist, Fellow
- Stephen Harrison (classicist) – Fellow
- John Watts (historian) – Fellow
- Mark Wrathall (philosopher) – Fellow

== Honorary Fellows ==
The following have been Honorary Fellows:

- Al Alvarez
- Gerard Baker
- Mohamed Bin Issa Al Jaber
- Ian Bostridge
- Sir Anthony Bottoms
- Kenneth Cameron, Baron Cameron of Lochbroom
- John Y. Campbell
- Michael Cockerell
- John M. Cooper
- Yang Jingnian

== See also ==
- Former students of Corpus Christi College, Oxford
