= Fortnum =

Fortnum may refer to:

- Fortnum & Mason, English department store
- William Fortnum, its founder
- Charles Drury Edward Fortnum (1820–1899), a later member of the same family, art collector, historian, and benefactor of the University of Oxford
- Peggy Fortnum (1919–2016), English writer and illustrator, notably of Paddington Bear
- Rebecca Fortnum (born 1963), British artist
