= Blood Orange (novel) =

2019 novel by Harriet Tyce

- Author: Harriet Tyce
- Language: English
- Genre: Psychological thriller
- Publisher: Wildfire (UK); Grand Central Publishing (US)
- Publication date: 2019
- Publication place: United Kingdom
- Pages: 326
- ISBN: 978-1-4722-5274-6
- Followed by: The Lies You Told

Blood Orange is a psychological thriller by Harriet Tyce, published in 2019 in the UK by Wildfire, and in the United States by Grand Central Publishing.

The story centres around Alison, a criminal barrister who drinks heavily and is having an extra-marital affair with Patrick, a colleague. Alison's first murder case leads her to see a parallel life to her own. Madeline, a wealthy woman found by the cleaner one morning sitting next to her stabbed husband, Edwin, insists she is guilty.

According to Amazon, the book became popular during the COVID-19 lockdowns in 2020.

== Publication ==
Blood Orange is a psychological thriller published in the UK by Wildfire, and in the United States by Grand Central Publishing. It is the first book of author Harriet Tyce, who was previously a criminal barrister. The book has been translated into 22 languages.

== Layout ==
The book has 25 chapters, preceded by a prologue followed by a chapter titled "five months laters" and a section including acknowledgements. There are 326 pages.

== Plot ==
Alison is an ambitious criminal barrister who has been practising for over 15 years. She drinks heavily and is having an extra-marital affair, although she repeatedly claims to end it at every encounter. One evening, instead of going home after just one drink as she had planned, she stays on after work in London with colleagues and has one drink after another, before returning to her chambers with her colleague, Patrick, who had been flirting with other women that evening. They have sex on her desk, after which he leaves and she is found the following morning by her husband Carl (a psychotherapist), and six-year-old daughter Matilda, who come seeking for her when she did not return home the previous evening.

At home, while recovering from a hangover, the initially seemingly perfect Carl cooks for friends, but Alison causes embarrassment in front of the guests and the following day Carl responds by showing her a video of her actions from that day. Carl keeps his promises to Matilda when Alison fails to wake up in time to go on an outing to a castle. Alison is surprised that she woke up so late, despite how much she drank. When Carl and Matilda return home, he turns his head to Alison's stew, a dish she spent the afternoon cooking. In several parts he questions her reliability and ability as a mother.

The following day, Alison discovers that Patrick will be instructing her in her first murder case; Madeline, a 44 year old wealthy woman who has been found by the cleaner one morning sitting next to her stabbed husband, Edwin, in the bedroom of their multi-million pound townhouse in Clapham, London. Both Alison and Patrick take a train to Beaconsfield to visit Madeline, who is staying with her sister, Francine. Madeline insists on pleading guilty, explaining that she had drunk around half a bottle of gin that night, and cannot recall what happened afterwards. Madeline's son James had visited his parents that weekend, but returned to boarding school the night before Edwin was found dead. On the return train journey after questioning Madeline, Patrick directs Alison to the carriage toilet for a sexual encounter and Alison, despite repeating to herself that her relationship with Patrick was over, obeyed him. She was sure that Carl was doing the school pick up, but he denied it, and Alison turns up late to collect Matilda.

The main body of the story revolves around Alison's unraveling of the true series of events of the murder, her relationship with Carl and Patrick, and the parallel life of what is soon revealed to be Madeline's life of abuse by her husband. The plot includes undisclosed messages to Alison, claiming to know about her affair, further videoing of Alison's activities, rape allegations of Patrick, and how Alison begins to understand herself by understanding Madeline. At one point, Alison visits the Apple store to enquire how her husband could have installed spying software on her phone. She soon realises that it was Carl who had been sending the undisclosed messages, had been drugging her, and he had been the psychologist encouraging rape allegations towards Patrick. By this time, Patrick had committed suicide and Carl had asked for a divorce.

== Characters ==
- Alison Bailey/Wood, protagonist
- Patrick, instructing solicitor
- Carl Wood, Alison's husband, psychotherapist
- Madeline Smith, suspect in murder case
- Edwin, Madeline's husband
- James, Madeline's son, stays at boarding school
- Francine, Madeline's sister, lives in Beaconsfield
- Caroline Napier, client of Carl, accused Patrick of rape

== Reception ==
According to Amazon, the book became popular during the COVID-19 lockdowns in 2020. In October 2020, The Herald also noted that the book's profile became popular largely by word of mouth, during this time. Between January and June 2020, it was in the top five best selling e-books. Blood Orange was a Richard and Judy Book Club pick. Novelist Lisa Jewell noted that it took her two days to read the book. It was described as what might initially be seen as "law-office melodrama", but becomes a "respectable thriller".

Several characters in the book have received comment. In the Washington Independent Review of Books, while Carl is a "sententious fussbudget of a husband", "Alison Bailey, is a workaholic, briskly competent criminal barrister in the English court system. After hours, she’s a fall-down drunk entangled in an adulterous and abusive affair with the senior solicitor" It describes both Carl and Patrick as "deplorable". The Guardian describes Carl as "an appalling self-righteous prig" who has been "gaslighting", and expressing "parental showboating".

The book was compared with Apple Tree Yard and The Girl on the Train.

== Adaptations ==
Quibi and World Productions, the producers of Line of Duty and Bodyguard, chose Blood Orange for development into a TV series.
