= Maysoon Al-Damluji =

Iraqi politician and women's rights campaigner

Maysoon Salem Al-Damluji
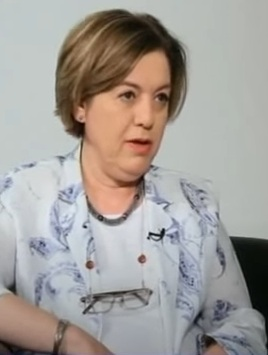

Deputy Minister of Culture of Iraq
- In office June 2004 – March 2006
- Prime Minister: Ayad Allawi

Personal details
- Born: 15 February 1962 (age 64) Baghdad, Iraq
- Party: Assembly of Independent Democrats
- Education: Architectural Association School of Architecture

Maysoon Salem Al-Damluji (Arabic: ميسون سالم الدملوجي); born 1962) first name also spelt Maysun, is a liberal Iraqi politician and women's rights campaigner. She was Iraq's deputy minister of culture from June 2004 until March 2006 and is a member of the Council of Representatives for the Al-Wataniya national coalition, headed by former Prime Minister and Vice President Iyad Allawi. Al-Damluji is the president of the Iraqi Independent Women's Group (IIWG). Her brother, Omar Al-Farouq Al-Damluji, was Iraq's minister of housing in 2004-5. Her nephew, Hassan Al-Damluji, is a British-Iraqi development strategist.

In 2010, Al-Damluji became the official spokesman for the Iraqiya movement, which later dissolved in December 2012.

== Background and Exile ==
Al-Damluji was born in 1962 in Baghdad to a family of doctors and politicians, and grew up in an upper-middle class society. Her great-uncle, Abdullah Al Damluji, was the first foreign minister of Saudi Arabia in the 1920s, before he returned to Baghdad, becoming Iraq's first foreign minister as well. Later, her uncle Feisal Al-Damluji served as a member of Parliament and a government minister several times before the 1958 Iraqi coup d'état. Both of Maysoon's parents were professors of medicine; her father, Dr. Salem Al-Damluji, was the head of Baghdad's medical school.

Al-Damluji graduated from Baghdad's Al Mansoor Private School in 1980.

Al-Damluji moved to London in 1981, after her parents were forced to leave Iraq because they refused to join the Baath Party. Joining her brother Saad in exile, Maysoon graduated from the Architectural Association in 1985 and started a practice in West London.

Always connected with her homeland, Maysoon was important in London's Iraqi community, founding and promoting organisations in support of Iraqi arts, including the Iraqi Artists Association, the Kufa Gallery, and the Studio of the Actor. She has partnered on various collaborations with London-based Iraqi artist Rashad Salim, the nephew of the Iraqi artist Jawad Salim. After 1990, she became increasingly involved in opposition politics and campaigning against the Baath regime.

== Return to Iraq ==
Just weeks after the war toppling Saddam Hussein came to an end, Al-Damluji returned to Iraq, initially intending to sojourn. However, she soon became involved in promoting women's rights, founding the Iraqi Independent Women's Group, of which she is president, and editing its magazine, "Noon".

Just six months after her return, she was offered a post in the shadow Iraqi administration that was formed during CPA rule as Deputy Minister of Culture. Maysoon held on to this post in the Iraqi government that followed the hand over of sovereignty to Prime Minister Iyad Allawi in 2004, as well as the government of Ibrahim al-Jaafari, who took power after the elections of January 2005.

During this period, Al-Damluji campaigned to save many of the major works of art that had been constructed during the Baath regime, as they represented the work of some of Iraq's best artists and often had little or no explicit connection with the Baath party. This activity made her highly unpopular in some circles, especially with religious Shi'ite groups, some of whom favoured a tabula rasa approach to Iraq's recent cultural heritage. In late 2005 Al-Damluji received the keys to the city of Babylon, in a ceremony celebrating the handing back of the important archaeological site to the Iraqi government, after it had been used as an American and then a Polish military base.

Despite the grave dangers to Iraq's cultural heritage, Maysoon gave up her government role in 2006 to take a place in the Council of Representatives, Iraq's parliamentary body, judging that more urgent matters were at stake in the legislative process. Since February 2006 she has represented the city of Mosul, her family's city of origin, taking up a seat occupied by her uncle Faisal Al-Damluji over fifty years previously. In the Council, Al-Damluji has continued her efforts to safeguard personal rights and freedoms in the emergent Iraqi legal system, which is dominated by those urging strict adherence to Shari'a (Islamic law).

This activity has threatened Al-Damluji's life on many occasions, as Iraq's increasing climate of religious extremism has made it a dangerous place for outspoken proponents of secular government and women's rights, especially unveiled women such as Al-Damluji. At least two founding members of the IIWG have been killed in recent years - Dr Akila Al-Hashimi, a member of the Iraqi Governing Council and Dr Amel Mamalchi an advisor at the Ministry of Municipalities and Public Works. Al-Damluji holds a profound role in Iraq. She has set goals in the country's government to overcome racial and gender inequality, including advocating for on behalf of women who suffer from, sexism, discrimination, and sexual assault. She has been actively critical of religious sectarian conflict in Iraq. Al-Damlouji has expressed her belief that faith, knowledge, and morality are interdependent. A liberal, cruelty-free society has become an important vision of Al-Damluji.
