= Harriet Tyce =

British novelist (born 1972)

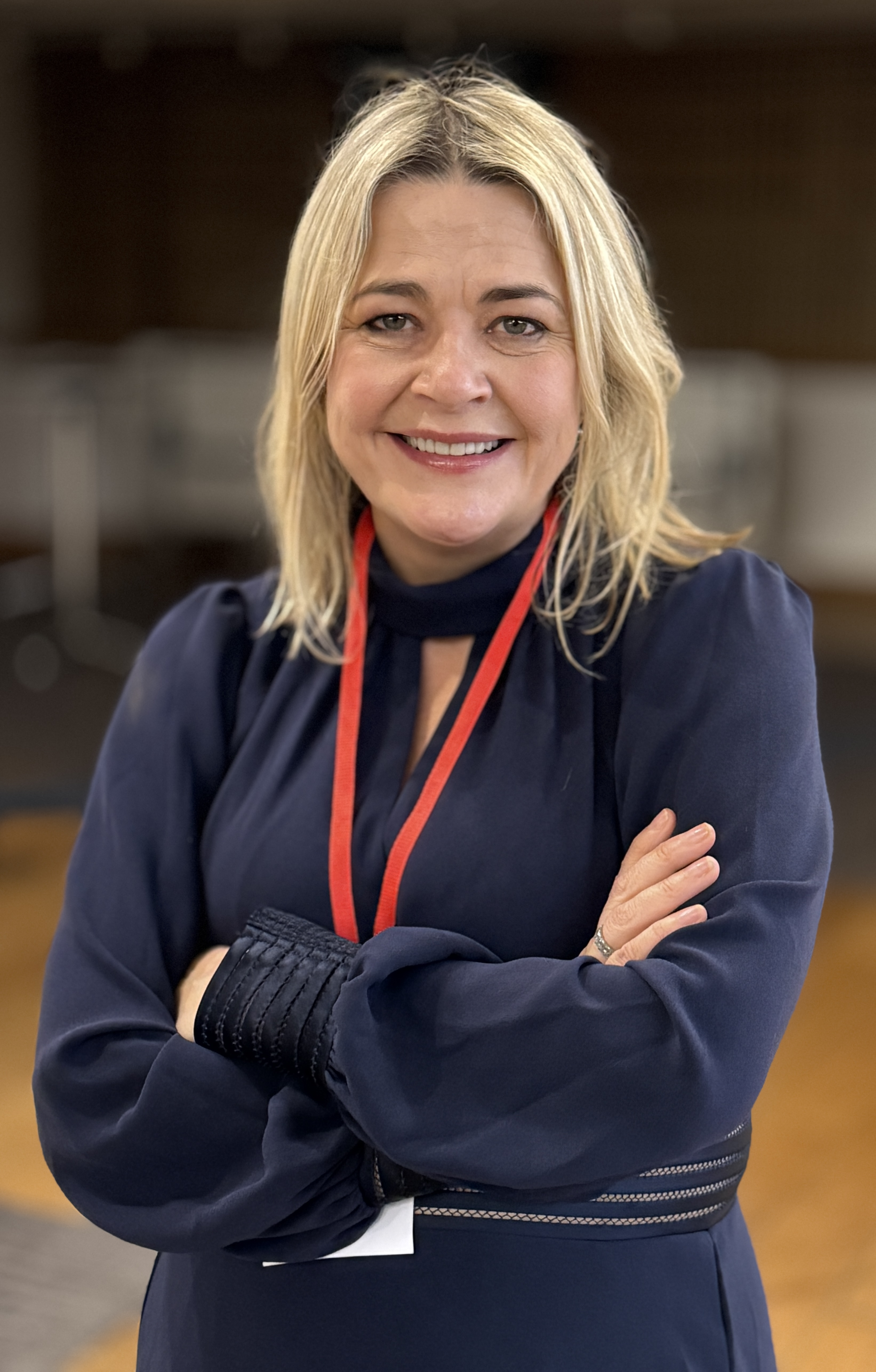
- Harriet Tyce (Royal Society of Medicine, 2025)
- Born: November 1972 (age 53)
- Education: Edinburgh Academy
- Alma mater: Corpus Christi College, Oxford; University of East Anglia
- Spouse: Nathaniel Tyce
- Children: 2
- Writing career
- Language: English
- Genre: Psychological thriller
- Notable works: Blood Orange (2019), Witch Trial (2026)
- Website: www.harriettyceauthor.com

Harriet Tyce (born November 1972) is a British novelist. She is the author of Blood Orange (2019), The Lies You Told (2020), It Ends at Midnight (2022), A Lesson in Cruelty (2024) and Witch Trial (2026).

Tyce practised as a criminal barrister for nearly ten years before changing her career path to writing crime fiction. Her first novel be was a Richard and Judy choice and became popular during the COVID-19 lockdowns in 2020.

In 2026, she appeared as a contestant on the fourth series of The Traitors.

== Early life and education ==
Harriet Tyce was born in November 1972 and grew up in Edinburgh, the eldest of two children of William Nimmo Smith, a judge; her mother, Jennifer, was an academic and classicist. She attended an all girls' school in Edinburgh, where she became friends with Sarah Hughes. She got straight As in her O-Level exams. Subsequently she moved to the Edinburgh Academy for sixth form, which was mixed-sex.

Tyce studied English literature at Oxford University, and then completed a law conversion course at City University.

== Career ==
For around ten years Tyce practised as a criminal barrister. In 2005, after attempting to work part-time and not long after her son was born, she left the bar. Later she completed a master's in creative writing and crime fiction at the University of East Anglia, passing with distinction.

After several rejections she acquired an agent and a book deal with Wildfire, an imprint of Headline Publishing Group. They published Blood Orange (2019), her first novel. It became a Richard and Judy Book Club choice. According to Amazon, the book became popular during the COVID-19 lockdowns in 2020. Quibi and World Productions optioned Blood Orange for development into a TV series.

After abandoning a second novel, she released The Lies You Told in 2020. Her book It Ends at Midnight was released in 2022. She wrote the introductory chapter to Holding Tight, Letting Go (2022). A Lesson in Cruelty was released in 2024.

In 2026, she appeared as a contestant on the fourth series of The Traitors. Her appearance on the series caused a surge in book sales.

== Personal life ==
Tyce lives with her husband Nathaniel, who works in finance. They have two children.

== Bibliography ==
- Blood Orange. Wildfire. 2019. ISBN 978-1-4722-5274-6.
- The Lies You Told. Wildfire. 2020. ISBN 978-1-4722-5279-1.
- It Ends at Midnight. Wildfire. 2022. ISBN 978-1-4722-8009-1.
- A Lesson in Cruelty. Wildfire. 2024. ISBN 978-1-4722-8014-5.
- Witch Trial. Headline Publishing Group. 2026. ISBN 978-1-0354-1191-7.
