= Anna Jewsbury =

English fashion designer

- Born: Anna Maria Jewsbury; 1986 (age 39–40)
- Education: Corpus Christi College, Oxford
- Years active: 2013–present
- Spouse: Hassan Damluji
- Children: 3
- Website: completedworks.com

Anna Maria Jewsbury (born 1986) is an English fashion designer and artistic director of London-based accessories brand, Completedworks.

== Early life and education ==
Jewsbury was born to an English father, a chemistry lecturer, and a Filipino mother, who worked in marketing and television, and grew up in Holmfirth, West Yorkshire with her older brother Mark. Jewsbury attended the same school as sculptor Barbara Hepworth, cited as an influence on her work. She went on to study Mathematics and philosophy at Corpus Christi College, Oxford, beginning her studies in 2004.

== Career ==
Jewsbury founded her brand Completedworks in 2013 with her older brother Mark Jewsbury, a former journalist. Completedworks is sold through retailers like Dover Street Market and Bergdorf Goodman, as well as via its own showroom in Marylebone, London. During lockdown the brand's Scrunch earrings, which resemble the silky hair ties popular in the 1990s, became a bestseller, appearing on the ears of models Rosie Huntington-Whiteley and Adwoa Aboah, and actor Jodie Comer.

== Personal life ==
Jewsbury lives in a converted pub in London. She is married to author and development expert Hassan Damluji, who also studied at Corpus Christi, Oxford. The couple have three children.

== Awards ==
- BFC / Vogue Designer Fashion Fund nominee (2022)
- British Fashion Council Fashion Trust (2022)
- BFC / Vogue Designer Fashion Fund nominee (2023)
