= Hassan Damluji =

British-Iraqi development expert

- Born: London
- Education: University of Oxford, Harvard University
- Occupation: Non-profit
- Organization: Global Nation
- Spouse: Anna Jewsbury
- Relatives: Maysoon Al-Damluji (her nephew)
- Website: https://globalnation.world/

Hassan Damluji (Arabic: حسن الدملوجي) is a British-Iraqi development expert and author. He is the co-founder of the think-tank Global Nation, which focuses on improving international cooperation to tackle issues like climate change and pandemics. He is a senior fellow at the London School of Economics, and formerly Deputy Director at the Bill and Melinda Gates Foundation. He is the author of The Responsible Globalist, published by Penguin Allen Lane in 2019.

== Biography ==
Damluji was born in London as Hassan Al-Damluji. He later changed his name, removing the epithet "Al".

Son of Saad Al-Damluji (1952-2006) who was originally from Baghdad. His father moved to the UK in 1970, and married his mother Mary Keane, from Ireland, in 1978.

He is the nephew of the Iraqi politician and women's rights campaigner Maysoon Al-Damluji.

He married Anna Jewsbury

Damluji is a board member of the Lives & Livelihoods Fund, a $2.5 billion fund. Gulf News described the fund as the "largest ever Middle-East based, fully-multilateral development initiative”

As of 2020, he was the Deputy Director of Global Policy and Advocacy for Bill & Melinda Gates Foundation.

== Published works ==
His book The Responsible Globalist: What Citizens of the World Can Learn from Nationalism was published in 2019.

== Awards ==
He has been named every year since 2015 as one of the 100 most influential Arabs under 40, by Arabian Business.
