= Rebecca Fortnum =

British artist, writer, and academic

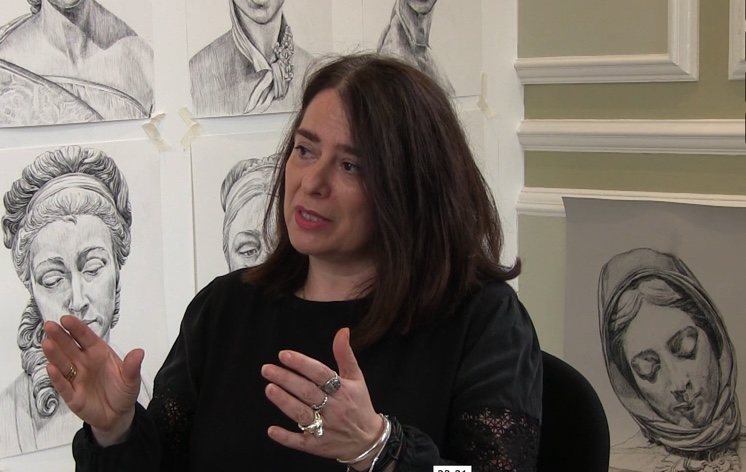
- Fortnum in 2019
- Born: 1963 (age 62–63); London, England
- Education: Corpus Christi College, Oxford
- Occupations: Artist, writer and academic

Rebecca Fortnum (born 1963) is a British artist, writer, and academic.

== Education and biography ==
Fortnum studied English at Corpus Christi College in Oxford before gaining an MFA at Newcastle University. In 2009, she became reader and pathway leader of fine art (visual art) at Camberwell College of Arts, one of London's leading art-education institutions. She was professor of fine art at Middlesex University, London, until 2016 and was professor of fine art at the Royal College of Art in London. She was founding editor of the Journal of Contemporary Painting published by Intellect, 2014–2024, and remains an editor. She was professor of fine art and head of the School of Fine Art at Glasgow School of Art from 2021 to 2024, and has been professor of fine art and associate dean of research at Central St Martins, University of the Arts, London, since 2024.

Fortnum was born in London in 1963. She currently lives and works in London as well. Fortnum, who primarily creates paintings, has exhibited in England and internationally, and has received grants and travel awards including the Pollock-Krasner Foundation; the British Council; the Arts Council of England; The British School at Rome and the Art and Humanities Research Council.

She has also conducted academic research and written extensively about artistic practice, especially the practice of contemporary women artists. Her visual art practices include painting, drawing, printmaking, and curating.

== Research ==
The research that Fortnum conducts falls into three different categories that include documenting artists’ processes, a visual art practice, and fine art pedagogic research. In 2008, she was appointed to be the international lead artist for Trade in Ireland and began to write about the role of "not knowing" within the creative process, publishing On Not Knowing; how artists think with Elizabeth Fisher in 2013. In 2023, at the Glasgow School of Art, she convened the conference "On Not Knowing; How Artists Teach" with Professor Magnus Quaife of UniArts Helsinki.

Her solo exhibition Self Contained was at the Freud Museum London in 2013 and was accompanied by a book published by RGAP. Fortnum has a specialized interest in women artists, which resulted in publishing a book called Contemporary British Women Artists in 2007. In this she interviewed artists for BBC Radio 4's Woman's Hour. In 2020, she co-edited A Companion to Contemporary Drawing with artist and academic Kelly Chorpening.

In 2019 she was elected visiting research fellow in the creative arts at Merton College Oxford, developing her project "A Mind Weighted by Unpublished Matter" published by slimvolume in 2020. In 2021, she was appointed senior research fellow at the Henry Moore Institute in Leeds, where she developed Les Praticiennes, an exhibition exploring the women sculptors of the Paris Belle Epoque.
